= List of Zimbabwean writers =

This is a list of Zimbabwean writers.

Bhekimpilo Sibanda Film and Media Historian Biographe and Culture and Heritage (1951) -

- N. H. Brettell (1908–1991), poet
- NoViolet Bulawayo (1981– ), novelist
- Patrick Chakaipa (1932–2003), novelist^{[Gikandi]} ^{[Jahn]}
- Charles C Singende (1943–2007), poet and Shona Literature Bureau, contributor and compiler of Nhetembo 1977^{[Gikandi]} ^{[Jahn]}
- L. Washington Chaparadza (1929–1964), Shona writer^{[Jahn]}
- Paul Chidyausiku (1929– ), preacher and writer^{[Gikandi]} ^{[Jahn]}
- Bernard Chidzero (1927–2002), economist and novelist^{[Gikandi]}
- Samuel Chimsoro (1949–2016), novelist and poet
- Shimmer Chinodya (1957– ), poet, short-story writer, novelist, and textbook writer^{[Gikandi]}
- Edmund Chipamaunga (1938–2019), novelist
- Herbert Chitepo (1923–1975), novelist
- Raymond Choto (1962– ), journalist and novelist^{[Gikandi]}
- A. S. Cripps (1869–1952), priest, short-story writer and poet
- Tsitsi Dangarembga (1959– ), novelist^{[Gikandi]}
- John Eppel (1947– ), novelist, poet and short-story writer
- Harold Farmer (1943- ), poet
- Petina Gappah (1971– ), short-story writer and novelist
- Chenjerai Hove (1956–2015), novelist, poet, critic and editor^{[Gikandi]}
- Wilson Katiyo (1947–2003), novelist^{[Gikandi]}
- Philios Mtshane Khumalo (1925– ), Shona writer^{[Jahn]}
- Giles Kuimba (1936– ), novelist^{[Gikandi]} ^{[Jahn]}
- Doris Lessing (1919–2013), born in Persia (now Iran), Nobel literature prize-winner, critic, novelist and short story writer^{[Gikandi]}
- Steve Linde (1960– ), newspaperman
- Ignatius Mabasa (1971– ), poet and novelist^{[Gikandi]}
- Nevanji Madanhire (1961– ), novelist and editor of the Zimbabwe Standard
- Wiseman Magwa (1962– ), playwright^{[Gikandi]}
- Barbara Makhalisa (1949– ), novelist and short-story writer
- Nozipo Maraire (1966– ), doctor and writer
- John Marangwanda (1923–?), Shona novelist^{[Jahn]}
- Dambudzo Marechera (1952–1987), novelist^{[Gikandi]}
- Edmund Masundire (1966– ), novelist^{[Gikandi]}
- Timothy O. McLoughlin (1937– ), novelist, poet and editor^{[Killam & Rowe]}
- Cont Mhlanga (1957/1958–2022), playwright, actor and theatre director
- S. O. Mlilo (1924–1995), Ndebele novelist^{[Gikandi]}
- Aaron Chiwundura Moyo (1959– ), novelist and playwright^{[Gikandi]}
- Charles Mudede (1949– ), writer, filmmaker, and leftwing cultural critic
- George Mujajati (1957– ), playwright and novelist
- Charles Mungoshi (1947–2019), writer and editor^{[Gikandi]}
- David Mungoshi (1949–2020), novelist and poet
- Masimba Musodza (1976– ), screenwriter, novelist, producer
- Solomon Mutswairo (1924–2005), novelist and poet (see also Zambia)^{[Gikandi]}
- Togara Muzanenhamo (1975– ), poet
- Geoffrey Ndhlala (1949– )^{[Killam & Rowe]}
- Emmanuel Ngara (1947– ), academic
- Mthandazo Ndema Ngwenya (1949–1992), novelist, radio playwright and poet^{[Gikandi]}
- Stanley Nyamfukudza (1951– ), novelist and short-story writer^{[Gikandi]}
- Freedom Nyamubaya (1958–2015), poet
- Emmanuel F. Ribeiro (1935–2021), novelist^{[Jahn]}
- Kristina Rungano (1963– ), first published woman poet in Zimbabwe
- Joe Ruzvidzo (1979– ), journalist and short-story writer
- Stanlake Samkange (1922–1988), historian and novelist^{[Gikandi]} ^{[Jahn]}
- Amos M. P. Sibanda (1927– ), novelist^{[Jahn]}
- Ndabezinhle S. Sigogo (1932–2006), novelist and editor^{[Gikandi]} ^{[Jahn]}
- Ndabaningi Sithole (1922–2000), historian, politician, and novelist^{[Gikandi]} ^{[Jahn]}
- Alexander McCall Smith (1948– ), also connected with Botswana, lawyer and novelist
- Valerie Tagwira (living), novelist
- T. K. Tsodzo / Thompson K. Tsodzo (1947– ), novelist^{[Gikandi]}
- Lawrence Vambe (1917–2019)
- Yvonne Vera, also connected with Canada (1964–2005), novelist, short-story writer and editor^{[Gikandi]}
- Andrew Whaley (1958– )
- Merna Wilson, novelist and poet.
- Paul Tiyambe Zeleza (1955– ), historian, critic, novelist and short-story writer
- Musaemura Zimunya (1949– ), poet, critic and short-story writer^{[Gikandi]}

== See also ==
- Zimbabwean literature
