= List of Zimbabwean women writers =

List of women writers from or associated with Zimbabwe

This is a list of Zimbabwean women writers, including writers either from or associated with Zimbabwe.

== B ==
- Catherine Buckle (born 1957), writer and blogger
- NoViolet Bulawayo (born 1981), novelist
- D. E. Borrell (1928–?), poet

== C ==
- Panashe Chigumadzi (born 1991), journalist, essayist and novelist
- Hazel Crane (1951–2003), memoirist
- Judy Croome (born 1958), novelist, short-story writer and poet
- Easther Batsirai Chigama (Born 1977), poet, short-story writer, playwright

== D ==
- Tsitsi Dangarembga (born 1959), novelist and filmmaker
- Doris Dube

== F ==
- Alexandra Fuller (born 1969)

== G ==
- Petina Gappah (born 1971), short-story writer and novelist

== H ==
- Heidi Holland (1947–2012), journalist and author

== L ==
- Doris Lessing (1919–2013), novelist, poet, playwright, biographer and short-story writer
- Lauren Liebenberg (born 1972), novelist

== M ==
- Barbara Makhalisa (born 1949), novelist, writer, editor
- Isabella Matambanadzo (born 1973)
- Diana Mitchell (1932–2016), political activist and writer
- Mavis Moyo (born 1929), broadcaster, radio journalist and media worker
- Florence Mudzingwa (living)
- Sharai Mukonoweshuro (1939–2014)

== N ==
- Ngwenya Tsitsi Nomsa (born 1977)
- Zodwa Nyoni (born c. 1988)
- Sekai Nzenza (living)

== P ==
- Gertrude Page (1872–1922), novelist
- Virginia Phiri (born 1954)

== R ==
- Kristina Rungano (born 1963), poet and short story writer

== S ==
- Irene Sabatini (living), fiction writer
- Patricia Schonstein (born 1952), novelist, poet, author of children's books
- Olivia Mahwaya Sibanda (born 1979)
- Lauren St John (born 1966), children's novelist
- Irene Staunton, publisher, editor, researcher and writer

== T ==
- Valerie Tagwira (living), obstetrician-gynecologist and novelist
- Tererai Trent (born c. 1965)
- Novuyo Tshuma (born 1988), short story writer

== V ==
- Yvonne Vera (1964–2005), novelist

== W ==
- Ellah Wakatama Allfrey (born 1966), editor, critic and journalist
- Merna Wilson, novelist, poet and journalist

== See also ==
- List of women writers
