= 2000 in Zimbabwe =

- Decades: 1980s; 1990s; 2000s; 2010s; 2020s
- See also: Other events of 2000; Timeline of Zimbabwean history

The following lists events that happened during the year 2000 in Zimbabwe:

== Incumbents ==
- President: Robert Mugabe
- First Vice President: Simon Muzenda
- Second Vice President: Joseph Msika

== Events ==
=== September ===
- Robert Mugabe, President of Zimbabwe is served with a civil suit while visiting the United Nations. The suit stated that he ordered killings, torture, and terrorism in his country and was seeking $400 million in damages.

Mugabe kept holding power in spite of presidential elections that were strongly suspected to be fraudulent. The pressure on journalists and opposition members and their families increased.

=== October ===
- Morgan Tsvangirai, politician, visited South Africa.
- 4 October - Armed police raided Capital Radio studios in Harare, confiscate equipment, dismantle aerials and searched shareholders' homes.
- 5 October - European Union committed an arms embargo on Zimbabwe.
- 6 October - Government gazetted new broadcasting regulations using Presidential Powers to ensure that 75 percent of all programming should have Zimbabwean content. Regulations exempt state-owned ZBC and ZTV.
  - 77 farms were gazetted for compulsory acquisition.
  - A Karoi court messenger was given a death threat after serving eviction notices on squatters and war veterans.
  - Macheke farmer, Alan Don, was attacked by war veterans. He was hospitalized with head injuries, a gunshot wound in his leg, three broken teeth, extracted fingernails, ruptured eardrum and severe bruising.
  - President Mugabe proclaimed an amnesty for political prisoners. Clemency Order No 1 of 2000 granted a free pardon to every person liable to prosecution for politically motivated crimes committed between 1 January and 31 July 2000.
- 9 October - Morgan Tsvangirai was questioned by police in Harare on his return from South Africa, about his involvement in treason and was released shortly afterwards.
- 12 October - Noczim (National Oil Company of Zimbabwe) debt to suppliers rose to Z$11 billion.
- 16 October - Karoi's Superintendent Mabunda was transferred to Harare after repeated accusations of biased policing.
  - The war veteran was accused of murdering opposition supporters in Kariba during the elections which was released on the grounds of "insufficient evidence". The war veteran proceeded to a farm in Karoi, evicted the owners and moved into the homestead. The owner, Mr. Slim Botha, died of a heart attack days after being forced off his property.
- 17 October - Bread riots broke out in Harare after a 30 percent price rise was implemented.
- 18 October - Bread riots spread to more suburbs in Harare.
  - Armed police assaulted an opposition member of parliament and his family accusing them of inciting food riots.
  - Army and police assaulted four South African journalists covering the food riots. Forced to lie on the ground, the four were beaten with batons and electric cables.
- 19 October - A 14-year-old schoolboy was hospitalized with two bullets in his ankle after being shot by riot police in the aftermath of the bread riots.
  - The Matabeleland Chamber of Industries stated that 50 percent of its members faced closure at the end of the year owing to the harsh economic climate. Analysts estimated 200,000 jobs would be lost.
- 20 October - The Harare High Court ordered that ZANU-PF (Zimbabwe African National Union- Patriotic Front) should not disburse $30 million it obtained under the Political Parties Finance Act. The money should by law be given to the opposition.
  - 108 farms were gazetted for compulsory acquisition.
  - A maize shortage was imminent as planting was down by 40 - 60 percent.
- 22 October - Bindura farm manager, Keith McGaw, was severely assaulted by war veterans. Beaten with axes, pick handles and sticks, Mr. McGaw had a fractured skull requiring 18 stitches and widespread bruising and lacerations.
- 23 October - President Mugabe referred to white Zimbabweans as "cheats" and "crooks" in a BBC radio programme.
  - On farms in Trelawny and Darwendale, convoys of government vehicles arrived and started distributing plots of land on unlisted properties. On one farm a convoy of 14 vehicles arrived, including army, air force and other government vehicles.
- 24 October - Victims of political violence were forced to flee their homes after being harassed and threatened by their assailants, pardoned by President Mugabe.
- 26 October - The opposition tabled a motion in parliament to impeach President Mugabe.
  - South African President Thabo Mbeki publicly condemned Zimbabwe's land grab for the first time.
  - President Mugabe threatened to revoke the policy of reconciliation and prosecuting whites for war crimes during the fight for Independence.
- 30 October - Macheke farmer, Herman van Duren, was hospitalized with head wounds after being attacked and robbed by armed assailants.
  - An air force helicopter circled tobacco seed beds on a farm in Norton to check that the owners had complied with their owner not to plant.
  - 97 prisoners had now been released under the Presidential Amnesty. 89 of the beneficiaries had already been convicted and were serving sentences in prison.
- 31 October - Shamva farmer, Guy French, and five of his workers were attacked by war veterans with sticks and nail-studded clubs when they tried to plant their ploughed field. Mr. French was hospitalized with severe concussion, bruising and lacerations; his workers were admitted to Shamva Hospital.

=== November ===
- 4,092 stockpiled anti-personnel mines were destroyed.
- 1 November - Fuel prices increased for the second time in three months.
  - Information Minister, Jonathan Moyo, called for the removal of Chief Justice Anthony Gubbay.
  - Karoi's Superintendent Mabunda returned to Karoi and visited all war veterans' bases on farms in the area. Increased violations were reported throughout the area that weekend including work stoppages, threats and a bull slaughtered. Farmers were laughed at by police in Karoi when they reported incidents.
- 6 November - University of Zimbabwe students held a demonstration in support of striking lecturers. Riot police arrived and shot tear-gas throughout the campus including in the hostels and UZ Clinic. Students were forced off the campus and the institution closed the following morning.
  - A High Court Judge in Harare reserved judgement in the fraud case against Chenjerai Hunzvi. Hunzvi, was accused of fabricating medical records and claiming a 118 percent disability from the War Victims' Compensation Fund.
- 8 November - The continuing illegal movement of cattle from communal to commercial farms by war veterans led to an outbreak of anthrax in Makoni North. Two people and 32 cattle died.
- 9 November - Z$25 million worth of export beef was found rotten at the CSC factory in Gweru because of a faulty vacuum-packaging machine.
- 10 November - The Supreme Court signed an Order by Consent declaring Fast-Track Resettlement unlawful. The commissioner of police was ordered to remove all squatters from farms that had been "fast-tracked".
- 12 November - Municipal police in Mutare shot and killed a 13-month-old baby whilst chasing unlicensed vendors at a bus stop.
- 13 November - Mazoe farmer, Robin Marshall, in the presence of police, was attacked by war veterans and hospitalized with head injuries.
- 14 November - War veterans began rebuilding shacks on farms near Harare.
- 17 November - President Mugabe's sister, Sabina, arrived at a farm in Norton in a Mercedes. She instructed 40 villagers to allocate land to themselves on a commercial farm that produced almost half of the country's seed maize.
  - 23 farms were gazetted for compulsory acquisition.
  - Finance Minister Simba Makoni presented the 2001 budget to parliament. Income and corporate taxes were reduced as was duty on beer and bicycles.
- 21 November - Anthrax spread to Makonde where three pigs and 17 cattle died and six people were hospitalized after eating contaminated meat.
  - Police fired live bullets at students protesting over catering at Hillside Teachers' Training College in Bulawayo.
  - High Court Judge Chidyuasiku issued a Provisional Order preventing implementation of the Supreme Court Order to remove "fast-tracked" squatters.
- 23 November - Leading pharmaceutical company, Johnson and Johnson, relocated their manufacturing division to South Africa owing to continue economic instability.
- 24 November - The Supreme Court overruled the High Court's Provisional Order saying it has no jurisdiction in the matter. The original Supreme Court Order stopped.
- 27 November - ZANU-PF woj the Marondera West by-election. The campaign was violent with numerous clashes and the death of one man. Out of 37,000 registered voters, only 12,000 went to the polls.
  - Army and police were put on full alert to deter mass action threatened by the opposition.
- 28 November - Nigeria's President Olusegun Obasanjo said that whilst he was willing to be a mediator in Zimbabwe's land crisis, the laws of the country had to be followed.
- 30 November - Minister of Information, Jonathan Moyo said government would not be removing squatters and war veterans from farms grabbed during "fast-track" resettlement. Minister Moyo said the Supreme Court Order was not a blanket eviction notice and that the government had not been acting unlawfully.
  - Farmers in Bindura named three top government officials (two of whom are government ministers) involved in masterminding violence in the area.
  - The CZI (Confederation of Zimbabwe Industries) announced that 23 percent of local manufacturing companies were to disinvest from Zimbabwe due to economic decline.
  - Telephone calls from Zimbabwe to Britain were barred because the local PTC had failed to service its debt of Z$870 million to British Telecom.

=== December ===
- 1 December - Bert Gardener, a Chinhoyi farmer in his mid-seventies was attacked in bed where his assailants attempted to strangle and suffocate him.
- 5 December - The state withdrew all charges against the war veteran who was suspected of murdering Macheke farmer David Stevens. According to the public prosecutor, charges were withdrawn due to "lack of evidence".
- 6 December - A Nyabira farmer was abducted by war veterans and forced to drive to State House for an audience with President Mugabe. Guards at State House refused the war veterans entry and police were called in to defuse the situation.
- 8 December - The Electoral Modification Act was promulgated. This Act nullifies all electoral petitions filed by the Movement for Democratic Change challenging the result of the June election in 40 constituencies.
- 11 December - Ndabaningi Sithole, who was born in 1920 in Nyamandhlovu, died aged 80. Sithole, a veteran nationalist, was the founder and president of ZANU with Robert Mugabe as secretary general.
- 12 December - Henry Elsworth aged 70, a former MP in both the Smith and Mugabe governments, was shot dead in an ambush on his farm. Mr Elsworth's son, Ian, was shot five times in the same incident and rushed to hospital.
- 14 December - High Court Judges confirmed that they were informed that war veterans intended to attack them in their homes. The Police Protection Unit said they are on full alert.
  - A Karoi farmer was attacked by 40 war veterans and received severe bruising.
  - The MDC filed an urgent application with the Supreme Court challenging the Electoral Modification Act.
- 15 December - While addressing delegates to the annual ZANU-PF congress, President Mugabe accused whites of destroying the economy. He said, "Our party must continue to strike fear in the heart of the white man. They must tremble ...".
  - The anthrax outbreak in Makonde spread. Thirteen people were hospitalized and 21 cattle had died.
  - The French Ambassador to Zimbabwe announced that France would not fund Zimbabwe's land reform programme as it was not being done within the law.
- 16 December - Police in Harare shot and killed a woman vegetable vendor whilst chasing a bus driver.
  - A policeman was stabbed and killed by people angered at the shooting of a vegetable vendor. Riot police used tear-gas to control mobs that threw stone and burnt police vehicles.
- 18 December - Chenjerai Hunzvi threatened to "deal with" police whom he accused of not supporting land resettlement.
  - A farmer in Bulawayo received a written death threat from war veterans. The letter referred to the murder in April of farmer Martin Olds and reads: "Your friend Martin was our breakfast for Christmas".
- 19 December - 50 people were injured in political violence in Bikita ahead of parliamentary by-election which had to be held in three weeks' time.
  - Anthrax spread to Mashonaland East. Five cattle died in Chiota.
- 20 December - President Mugabe was heckled and booed in parliament as he was making his annual State of the Nation address.
- 21 December - The United Nations Development Programme (UNDP) administrator, Mark Mallock Brown, submitted his report on land reform to the government. The UN restated its position that the government should drop the "fast-track" resettlement programme.
  - The Supreme Court declared that the rule of law had been persistently violated in the commercial farming areas and that the people in those areas had suffered discrimination in contravention of the constitution. The Court further stated that the people in those areas had been denied the protection of the law and had their rights of assembly and association infringed. The Court ordered the minister of Home Affairs and the commissioner of police to restore the rule of law in commercial farming areas by no later than July 1, 2001.

== Deaths ==
=== March ===
- 26 March 2000: Edwin Gomo. (MDC) Bindura.
- 26 March 2000: Robert Musoni. Mazowe West.

=== April ===
- 2 April 2000: Doreen Marufu. (MDC) Mazowe.
- 4 April 2000: Tinashe Chakwenya. (Z.R. Police constable) Marondera.
- 14 April 2000: Tichaona Chiminya. (MDC) Buhera North.
- 15 April 2000: David Stevens. (MDC) Commercial Farmer. Murehwa.
- 15 April 2000: Talent Mabika. (MDC) Buhera North.
- 18 April 2000: Martin Olds. (MDC) Commercial Farmer. Bubi-Umguza.
- 20 April 2000: Julius Andoche. Farm Foreman. Murehwa South.
- 23 April 2000: Peter Kareza. (MDC) Shamva.
- 24 April 2000: Mr. Banda. (MDC) Shamva.
- 25 April 2000: Nicholas Chaitama. (MDC) Kariba.
- 25 April 2000: Luckson Kanyurira. (MDC) Kariba.
- 30 April 2000: Matthew Pfebve. (MDC) Mount Darwin.

=== May ===
- 6 May 2000: Tapera. Macheke.
- 7 May 2000: Laben Chiwara. Harare.
- 7 May 2000: Allan Dunn. Commercial Farmer. Seke.
- 13 May 2000: Alex Chisasa. (Z. R. Police) Chipinge South.
- 14 May 2000: John Weeks. Commercial Farmer. Seke.
- 16 May 2000: Takundwa Chipunza. (MDC) Budiriro, Harare.
- 17 May 2000: Joseph Mandeya. (MDC) Mutasa.
- 17 May 2000: Mationa Mushaya. (United Party) Mutoko.
- 17 May 2000: Onias Mushaya. (United Party) Mutoko.
- 27 May 2000: Kufandaedza Musekiwa. Marondera West.
- 29 May 2000: Thadeus Rukini. (MDC) Masvingo.
- 31 May 2000: Tony Oates. Commercial Farmer. Zvimba North.

=== June ===
- 10 June 2000: Leo Jeke. Masvingo.
- 10 June 2000: Fainos Zhou. (MDC) Mberengwa.
- 11 June 2000: Mr. Chinyere. (MDC)
- 19 June 2000: Constantine Mafemeruke. Kariba.
- 19 June 2000: Patrick Nabanyama. (MDC) Bulawayo. Abducted, presumed dead.
- 20 June 2000: Zeke Chigagura. (MDC) Gokwe East.
- 20 June 2000: Tichaona Tadyanemhandu. (MDC) Hurungwe.
- 23 June 2000: Wonder Manhango. (MDC) Gokwe North.
- 27 June 2000: Matyatya. (MDC) Gweru.
- 29 June 2000: Mandishona Mutyanda. (MDC) Kwekwe.
- June 2000: Nhamo Gwase. (MDC) Murehwa South.

=== July ===
- 23 July 2000: Willem Botha. Commercial Farmer. Seke.
- 27 July 2000: Itayi Maguwu. (MDC) Harare.

=== August ===
- 9 August 2000: Samson Mbewe. Farm Worker. Goromonzi.

=== September ===
- 14 September 2000: Obert Guvi. Hurungwe West.

=== November ===
- 19 November 2000: Lemani Chapurunga. Marondera West.
- 19 November 2000: Rimon Size. Marondera West.

=== December ===
- 12 December 2000: Henry Elsworth. (Commercial Farmer) Kwekwe.
- 13 December 2000: Howard Kareza. (MDC) Shamva.
- 31 December 2000: Bernard Gara (Zanu PF) Bikita West, Masvingo.
