= Irene Staunton =

Zimbabwean publisher and editor

Irene Staunton is a Zimbabwean publisher, editor, researcher and writer, who has worked in literature and the arts since the 1970s, both in the UK and Zimbabwe. She is co-founder and publisher of Weaver Press in Harare, having previously co-founded Baobab Books. Staunton is the editor of several notable anthologies covering oral history, short stories, and poetry, including Mothers of the Revolution: War Experiences of Thirty Zimbabwean Women (1990), Children in our Midst: Voices of Farmworker's Children (2000), Writing Still: New Stories from Zimbabwe (2003), Women Writing Zimbabwe (2008), Writing Free (2011), and Writing Mystery & Mayhem (2015).

== Career ==
Staunton was born in Southern Rhodesia, which later became Zimbabwe, and studied English literature in the UK. She began her career in publishing in London, where she was employed by John Calder. Following the 1980 Independence of Zimbabwe, she returned there and worked as an editor first for the Department of Culture in the Ministry of Education and Culture, and then on the Curriculum Development Unit in the same Ministry.

=== Baobab Books ===
In 1987, Staunton and Hugh Lewin co-founded Baobab Press, "which rapidly acquired a reputation as an exciting literary publisher", and during her 11 years there the company published a range of fiction, non-fiction, poetry, children's books, art books and textbooks. Baobab's list included prizewinning work by such authors as Chenjerai Hove (Noma Award for Publishing in Africa) and Shimmer Chinodya (winner of the Commonwealth Writers' Prize, Africa region), as well as the posthumous work of Dambudzo Marechera, and all of Yvonne Vera's fiction. Baobab also published several collections of poetry, including one by the performance poet, Chirikure Chirikure. While at Baobab Books, Staunton compiled the first Zimbabwean oral history with narratives of women in the liberation struggle, Mothers of the Revolution. She has said: "I was very fortunate in that my parents taught us to respect people from all walks of life and showed us that what mattered was not money or status but warmth, compassion, humour and integrity – values rooted in self-respect and human dignity. My mother was also involved in the Federation of African Women’s Clubs, doing voluntary work that she enjoyed very much and which gave me, through her, access to strong, gentle, humorous women working long hours for their families in rural areas."

=== Weaver Press ===
In 1999, Staunton left Baobab and began setting up Weaver Press with Murray McCartney, also working part-time for the Heinemann African Writers Series until 2003. Established as a small independent general publishing company, producing books by and about Zimbabwe (encompassing literary fiction, history, politics, social studies and gender issues), Weaver Press now counts among its successful authors Chimamanda Ngozi Adichie, NoViolet Bulawayo, Brian Chikwava, Shimmer Chinodya, Petina Gappah, Tendai Huchu, Sarah Ladipo Manyika, Sekai Nzenza, Valerie Tagwira, Yvonne Vera, among others. Tinashe Mushkavanhu has written of Staunton: "It was the work of writers she published that always occupied center stage, winning international accolades, or getting translated. ...Weaver Press has been the most active publishing concern in Zimbabwe in a struggling economy". The company's fiction programme has been developed with support from Dutch NGO Hivos.

=== Related literary activities ===
Staunton has for many years concerned herself with research through oral histories, sometimes in projects with other organizations, focusing on otherwise unheard African voices, particularly of Zimbabwean women and children.

She has worked with Save the Children Zimbabwe on various publications, including Children in Our Midst: Voices of Farmworkers' Children (2000), based on interviews with (and including drawings by) hundreds of children moving from farm school to farm school in rural Zimbabwe, who speak on the range of issues that affect them. The reviewer for the journal Children, Youth and Environments wrote: "The chapters, composed entirely of the children's written or recorded statements, cover many aspects of the children’s lives, including their sense of self ('I am a child'), families, homes, work experience, school, customs and play ('Sometimes we have fun'). ...This is not simply a book that publishes the opinions of working children. It is a book that challenges our Western assumptions about healthy childhood. It paints vivid pictures of what it is like to grow up on commercial farms in Zimbabwe, with work responsibilities from a very young age integrated into education and upbringing, as a legitimate aspect of the local traditions."

In collaboration with Chiedza Musengezi of Zimbabwe Women Writers, Staunton compiled A Tragedy of Lives: Women in Prison in Zimbabwe, based on interviews with former female prisoners, and Women of Resilience: The Voices of Women Ex-combatants (2000).

Staunton's own short story "Pauline's Ghost" was shortlisted for the 2009 PEN/Studzinski Literary Award, judged by J. M. Coetzee.

Well respected as an editor and publisher whose authors regularly win prizes — Stanley Gazemba in his recent article "African Publishing Minefields and the Woes of the African Writer" commends the attention paid by Staunton "to the editing process and the design and quality of her books" — she has been an invited participant in local and international literary events. She has edited a number of well received collections of Zimbabwean writing, and has also written articles on publishing in Zimbabwe. For 12 years from 2003 she worked closely with Poetry International as their Zimbabwe editor, handing over the role in 2015 to Togara Muzanenhamo. Speaking in a 2011 interview Staunton said: "Editors are a bit like stage-hands: the play can't go on without them, and yet their role is necessarily in the shadows. It is, however, interesting to see how many writers acknowledge their editors – the third eye is of value."

== Personal life ==
Staunton is married to Murray McCartney, whom she met at the Africa Centre in London while he was deputy director there. McCartney moved to Harare with her in 1983, and is a director of Weaver Press.

== Selected bibliography ==
As editor

- Mothers of the Revolution: War Experiences of Thirty Zimbabwean Women, Harare: Baobab Books, 1990; London, UK: James Currey, 1991. Reprinted Harare: Weaver Press, 2020, ISBN 9781779223586.
- Children in Our Midst: Voices of Farmworkers' Children (ed. Irene McCartney), Harare: Weaver Press, with Save the Children, 2000. ISBN 978-0797420328.
- (with Chiedza Musengezi) A Tragedy of Lives: Women in Prison in Zimbabwe, Harare: Weaver Press, 2000. ISBN 1779220170.
- (with Chiedza Musengezi) Women of Resilience: the voices of ex-combatants, Harare: Zimbabwe Women Writers, 2000. ISBN 9780797420021.
- We Have Something to Say: Children in Zimbabwe Speak Out, Children's Consortium, 2002. ISBN 9780797424029.
- Writing Still: New Stories from Zimbabwe, Harare: Weaver Press, 2003. ISBN 1-77922-018-9.
- Laughing Now. New Stories from Zimbabwe, Harare: Weaver Press, 2005. ISBN 1-77922-043-X.
- Our Broken Dreams – Child Migration in Southern Africa (ed. with Chris McIvor and Chris Björnestad), Weaver Press, 2008. ISBN 9781779220707.
- Women Writing Zimbabwe, Harare: Weaver Press, 2008. ISBN 978-1-77922-073-8.
- Writing Free, Harare: Weaver Press, 2011. ISBN 978-1-77922-157-5.
- Writing Lives, Harare: Weaver Press, 2014. ISBN 978-1-77922-270-1.
- Writing Mystery & Mayhem, Harare: Weaver Press, 2015. ISBN 978-1-77922-278-7.
