= 2001 in Zimbabwe =

- Decades: 1980s; 1990s; 2000s; 2010s; 2020s
- See also: Other events of 2001; Timeline of Zimbabwean history

== Incumbents ==
- President: Robert Mugabe
- First Vice President: Simon Muzenda
- Second Vice President: Joseph Msika

== Events ==
=== January ===
- The Anti-Personnel Mines (Prohibition) Act 2000" is incorporated into Zimbabwe's domestic law.
- One person is murdered in political violence in January 2001.
- 1 January – Movement for Democratic Change (MDC) supporter Bernard Gara is murdered in Bikita West.
- 13–14 January – By-elections held in Bikita West are won by ZANU–PF.
- 16 January – Democratic Republic of Congo President Laurent Kabila is assassinated and given medical treatment in Harare.
- 26 January – 133 farms are listed for compulsory acquisition by government.
- 28 January – Z$100 million printing presses of the Daily News are bombed.

=== February ===
- One person is murdered in political violence in February 2001.
- 3 February – Riot police break up a peaceful demonstration by journalists in Harare protesting the bombing of the Daily News.
- 9 February – Police have still made no arrests in connection with Daily News bombing
  - Government begins to pressure Supreme Court Chief Justice Gubbay to resign.
- 14 February – Armed men in army uniform storm the house of MDC MP Job Sikhala and assault him and his pregnant wife.
- 16 February – War veterans arrive en masse in Masvingo ahead of mayoral elections.
- 22 February – Foreign journalist Mercedes Sayagues and BBC Correspondent Joseph Winter, both resident in Zimbabwe, are declared prohibited immigrants and ordered to leave the country
  - People suspected to be war veterans attempt to break into the home of journalist Joseph Winter
  - CIO agents attempt to break into the home of Loice Matanda-Moyo, an officer in the Attorney General's Office who had granted an order extending the departure date of journalist Joseph Winter.
- 27 February – Senior Police Assistant Commissioner Solomon Ncube resigns from the force.

=== March ===
- Five people are murdered in political violence in March 2001.
- 1 March – In an annual report, figures show that tourist arrivals have shrunk by 60 per cent and over 5000 people have been made redundant in the sector in the past year.
- 2 March – Soldiers are unleashed in Chitungwiza and other high-density suburbs around Harare; numerous civilians are severely assaulted over a number of days
  - War veteran shareholders of ZEXCOM call for the arrest of Chenjerai Hunzvi over fraud allegations amounting to Z$50 million.
- 4 March – Commercial farmer Gloria Olds, aged 72, is shot 15 times at her gate shortly after dawn, her dogs are killed and her car is used as a getaway vehicle.
- 6 March – Inyathi farmer Denis Streak is abducted and held for a number of hours by war veterans.
- 7 March – Armed men claiming to be war veterans shoot and seriously injure Trust Moyo and David Mota in Epworth outside Harare
  - Police have still made no arrests in connection with the bombing of the Daily News printing presses and have released no information on the matter.
- 8 March – ZANU–PF-supporting judge, Godfrey Chidyausiku, is appointed Acting Chief Justice of the Supreme Court
  - ZANU–PF MP Eddison Zvobgo accuses ZANU–PF of introducing unconstitutional and irrational laws governing broadcasting in Zimbabwe
  - Armed war veterans invade an Harare estate agency and assault the managing director
  - High Court hears sworn testimony that Olivia Muchena (MP for Mutoko South) told people at a rally that anyone who supported the MDC would be killed.
- 9 March – The Midlands Chamber of Zimbabwe Industries (CZI)reports that 1000 workers have been retrenched in the last two months in the Midlands.
- 19 March – Zimbabwe Republic Police (ZRP) promote 300 war veterans to rank of Sergeant & Assistant Inspector.
- 20 March – A delegation from the committee to Protect Journalists meets with Zimbabwe's ambassador to the US.
- 22 March – Exiled Ethiopian dictator Mengistu Haile Mariam and his family are given permanent resident status in Zimbabwe
  - Inflation hits 57.7 per cent.
- 23 March – War veterans storm the Harare Children's Home, shout, threaten and demand to see the supervisor; they also invade more than a dozen other Harare businesses under the guise of resolving labour disputes
  - 95 farms are listed for compulsory acquisition.
- 26 March – War veterans and ZANU–PF supporters close down Bulawayo textile company Dezign Inc.
- 28 March – 500,000 people register for food aid in the Masvingo province
  - War veterans and ZANU–PF supporters invade companies in Kadoma.
- 29 March – Masvingo Provincial Governor Josiah Hungwe threatens Masvingo residents with death if they do not vote for ZANU–PF in mayoral elections.
- 31 March – Harare Hospital reports that it has run out of essential drugs; nine infant deaths are being recorded per week at the hospital; 80 per cent of children admitted are suffering from malnutrition.

=== April ===
- 2 April – Nurses and health workers in Nkayi, suspected of supporting the MDC, are dismissed and replaced by army personnel.
- 4 April – Chenjerai Hunzvi announces that war veterans will set up base centres in all urban centres
  - Teachers are forced to pay protection money to war veterans in Mashonaland East.
- 9 April – Zimbabwean lawyers petition Police Commissioner Augustine Chihuri to stop police harassment of lawyers
  - University of Zimbabwe (UZ) first-year student Batanai Hadzizi dies after being assaulted by riot police.
- 10 April – Riot police fire shrapnel-loaded tear gas at University of Zimbabwe students who march in peaceful protest through Harare
  - War veteran Joseph Chinotimba declares himself the president of the Zimbabwe Congress of Trade Unions
  - War veterans and ZANU–PF supporters invade and close the Chipinge branch of Farm and City Centre.
- 12 April – War veterans and ZANU–PF supporters assault five senior officials at the Cotton Company of Zimbabwe's Gokwe branch
  - Hundreds of villagers from the Kezi district flee to the mountains to escape rampaging war veterans and government supporters incensed at the locals' support of an MDC rally.
- 18 April – President Mugabe threatens to nationalise mines and manufacturing companies that are closing down due to economic collapse.
- 20 April – Two Pakistani Businessmen who have invested Z$200 million in Zimbabwe flee the country after repeated attacks by war veterans on their city businesses and homes
  - 137 farms are listed for compulsory acquisition by the government.
- 24 April – War veterans and ZANU–PF supporters invade the Harare Avenues Clinic, Macsteel Zimbabwe, Meikels department store and the Forestry Commission; they also force the Dental Clinic to pay out Z$7 million, and the company closes completely.
- 25 April – War veterans and ZANU–PF supporters invade Mechman Engineering and successfully demand pay-outs to employees of Z$7 million; they also invade Resource Drilling, Trinidad Industries, Lobels Bakery, Scotco, Omnia Fertilizer, Leno Trading, Willdale Bricks, Madel Training Centre, Craster and Phillips.
- 26 April – South Africa summons the Zimbabwe High Commissioner and protests the violent attacks on its business in Harare
  - Chenjerai Hunzvi warns that war veterans will target foreign embassies and NGOs in the ongoing company invasions; the EU protests to the Zimbabwe government about war veterans who raid and steal Z$1 million worth of food aid given to victims of Cyclone Eline
  - The Law Society urges Justice Minister Chinamasa to end attacks against lawyers
  - A seven-member panel of international jurists releases a report criticising attacks against Zimbabwe's judiciary.
- 27 April – Agriculture Minister Joseph Made insists that there will be no food shortages in Zimbabwe and no need to import any wheat or maize
  - 374 farms are listed for compulsory acquisition by the government – included are the country's major tea and coffee estates.
- 28 April – Still no arrests three months after Daily News press bombings
  - Minister of Youth, Border Gezi, dies in a car crash.
- 30 April – Red Cross and Red Crescent Societies move their seven expatriate families out of Zimbabwe, fearing for their safety.

=== May ===
- Three people are murdered in political violence in May 2001.
- 1 May – War veteran Joseph Chinotimba invades May Day celebrations and takes over the proceedings, says companies in Bulawayo will be named for invasions by his colleagues.
- 4 May – Economists predict that Z$8.5 billion will be needed to import grain into Zimbabwe; 40 farms are listed for compulsory acquisition by the government; MDC activists are kidnapped and beaten in Masvingo.
- 6 May – Riot police seal off high-density suburbs in Masvingo as political violence breaks out. MDC supporters are arrested and have their car impounded.
- 8 May – Agriculture Minister Joseph Made announces that all wheat exports have immediately been suspended. Made continues to insist that wheat stocks are adequate and no grain will have to be imported; violent clashes take place in Masvingo between MDC and ZANU–PF supporters led by Chenjerai Hunzvi, and 13 people are injured.
- 10 May – The British Council closes its Library and Information Department Offices in Harare for safety reasons; the World Press Freedom Campaign urges the Zimbabwean government to ensure the safety of journalists; Information Minister Jonathon Moyo says government will not order a halt to company invasions by war veterans.
- 11 May – Eighty-one farms are listed for compulsory acquisition by the government; the world-famous Gonarezhou National Park, which is state-owned land, is demarcated into plots for agricultural resettlement; the French ambassador to Zimbabwe publicly condemns invasions of companies by war veterans.
- 14 May – Mayoral elections in Masvingo are won by the MDC candidate.
- 16 May – War veterans invade Speciss College in Harare.
- 18 May – Some war veterans are arrested on charges of invading companies, but their leaders are not touched, in what is seen as a cover-up operation; one of those arrested, Mike Moyo, says Chinotimba and Hunzvi have benefited financially from the invasions and threatens to reveal them; Mike Moyo is released from police custody; 19 farms are listed for compulsory acquisition by the government.
- 23 May – The house of Willias Madzimure, politician, is attacked by war veterans. The youth of the Movement for Democratic Change move into the area to protect the house.
- 24 May – The Danish embassy suspends Z$100 million aid for private sector partnerships in Zimbabwe; Chenjerai Hunzvi is said to be recovering in hospital after collapsing in Bulawayo; the war veterans association denies reports that Hunzvi has died.
- 25 May – Chenjerai Hunzvi is transferred to Parirenyatwa Hospital in Harare and said to be suffering from malaria.
- 26 May – Defence Minister Moven Mahachi dies in a car crash near Nyanga; five other people in the car at the time only sustain minor injuries.
- 27 May – MDC council election candidate is kidnapped and assaulted by ZANU–PF supporters; he still wins the election in Plumtree for the MDC.
- 29 May – ZANU–PF supporters attack six homes, burn possessions and assault people they suspect of supporting the MDC in Bindura; the CFU says maize production has dropped by 43 per cent and predicts a deficit of 600 000 tonnes.
- 30 May – US Secretary of State, Colin Powell, speaks out strongly against President Mugabe and urges South Africa to do likewise.
- 31 May – Government officials including police, CIO and municipal workers are implicated in a land scam in which resettled people paid them Z$10 million in order to be allocated plots of land in Matabeleland; the CFU withdraws all litigation against the government and announces the formation of the Zimbabwe Joint Resettlement Initiative with Z$1 billion offered in aid for resettled people.

=== June ===
- One person is murdered in political violence in June 2001.
- 4 June – War veteran leader Chenjerai "Hitler" Hunzvi dies at 51.
- 7 June – War veterans invade the property of black commercial farmer Philemon Matibe who was the MDC candidate for Chegutu and whose contesting of the 2000 parliamentary election results in court is due to commence within days; Mr Matibe is forced to vacate the farm and dismiss his workers.
- 8 June – Twenty-seven farms in Macheke are not operating due to war veterans enforcing work stoppages.
- 9 June – War veterans invade the Beatrice Country Club. Farmers holding a cricket match are accused of celebrating the death of Chenjerai Hunzvi. War veterans chase all patrons away, consume all the food and alcohol and rename the premises the Chenjerai Hitler Hunzvi Club.
- 12 June – The Bulawayo branch of the CZI reports that 400 companies have closed and 100,000 people have been made jobless due to continuing economic decline.
- 13 June – War veterans vandalise Z$50 million of property on farms in Masvingo.
- 14 June – Petrol, diesel, paraffin and aviation fuel prices rise by 70 per cent.
- 15 June – A 50-year-old female Australian aid worker is assaulted by war veterans for walking past the house where mourners of Chenjerai Hunzvi were gathered; the Agricultural Workers Union reports that only three out of every 500 people being resettled on seized farms are farm workers and says many thousands face destitution.
- 17 June – Farm worker Zondiwa Dumukani is beaten to death with golf clubs by government supporters in front of numerous eyewitnesses and a ZBC television camera crew; war veterans burn tobacco seed beds on seven properties, one of which reports loss to the value of Z$42 million. The Tobacco Association reports that 80 tobacco farms have been prevented from planting a crop, representing a loss of 19 per cent of the country's total harvest.
- 18 June – BBC documentary producer Sean Langan is ordered out of the country; eight headmen, 25 teachers and two headmasters are fired by way veterans in Buhera and ordered to leave the area.
- 19 June – A BBC TV crew (Simon Finch, John Sweeney and James Miller) are ordered out of Zimbabwe by Information Minister Jonathon Moyo.
- 20 June – Ministry of Education officials tell teachers fired by war veterans in Buhera that if they do not resolve their political differences with war veterans they will be struck off the payroll.
- 22 June – 421 farms are listed for compulsory acquisition by government. Included is the farm belonging to murdered farmers Martin and Gloria Olds. Also listed are missions owned by the Catholic Church, land owned by the Cold Storage Company and the National Railways.
- 26 June – 35 people are injured when government supporters descend on a gold mine in Shamva, beat people and destroy property, accusing the mine owners of allowing NCA (Constitutional Assembly) meetings to be held there; scores of villagers, MDC activists and NCA members flee their homes in Guruve after being attacked by government supporters who accuse them of supporting the MDC.
- 28 June – The EU gives the Zimbabwe government 60 days to end violence and farm occupations, abolish curbs on media and uphold court rulings, or face tough penalties.
- 29 June – An 18-page supplement to the Herald newspaper lists another 2030 farms which have been gazetted for compulsory acquisition by the government: 90 per cent of farming properties in the country are now listed for seizure; UK Daily Telegraph journalist David Blair is ordered to leave Zimbabwe.
- 30 June – Sixty war veterans armed with axes and broken bottles barricade the Marondera Hotel and prevent an NCA meeting from being held there.

=== July ===
- 2 July – Armed war veterans evict a family from their home in Waterfalls in Harare, saying they are going to settle on the premises; the Supreme Court rules four to one that the government's Fast Track Land Resettlement Scheme is illegal and that no more Section 5 or 8 letters should be issued.
- 5 July – Author George Mujajati is severely assaulted in his home by armed men in army uniform for not going to work due to the nationwide stayaway called by ZCTU; armed soldiers beat people indiscriminately in five Harare high-density suburbs for the same reason; farming industry experts say that farm output will decline by 90 per cent and 300,000 farm workers will become destitute if the government goes ahead with the seizure of all farms listed for acquisition.
- 6 July – New Chief Justice Chidyausiku says that previous Supreme Court rulings against the government's land reform programme was incorrect, four judges in the Supreme Court disagree with the judgement; legislation is gazetted barring dual nationality in Zimbabwe: people who were born in Zimbabwe but whose parents were not are required to renounce any claims to citizenship by ancestry of any other country; 20,000 war veterans are given backdated allowances by the government for their role in land seizures after representation was made by Joseph Chinotimba to ZANU–PF.

=== December ===
- 4 December – The Supreme Court rules that Robert Mugabe's controversial land reform programme is legal.

== Deaths ==
=== January ===
- 16 January – Ropafadzo Manyame. (MDC) Bikita

=== February ===
- 22 February – Peter Wayner (Fr.) Masvingo

=== March ===
- 4 March – Gloria Olds. (Commercial Farmer) Bubi-Umguza
- 23 March – Eswat Chihumbiri. Muzarabani
- 30 March – Ndonga Mupesa. (MDC) Muzarabani
- March – Robson Chirima. (MDC) Muzarabani
- March – Peter Mataruse. (MDC) Muzarabani

=== April ===
- Border Gezi, Youth and Employment Creation Minister dies in a car accident.

=== May ===
- 1 May – Richard Chikwenya. (MDC) Buhera North
- 4 May – Misheck Mwanza. (MDC) Zvimba North.
- 18 May – Winnie Nyambare. Guruve.
- 26 May – Moven Mahachi, Minister of Defence is killed in a car crash.

=== June ===
- 9 June – Zondani Dumukani. (Farm worker) Harare.

=== July ===
- 3 July – James Nyika. (MDC) Hatfield, Harare.
- 2 July – John Chakwenya. Epworth, Harare.
- 3 July – John Manomera. (MDC) Hatfield, Harare.
- 22 July – Peter Mandindishi. Bindura.
- 27 July – Gilson Gwenzi. (MDC) Mwenezi.

=== August ===
- 2 August Thomas Katema. Harare.
- 6 August – Robert Cobbet. (Commercial Farmer) Kwekwe.

=== September ===
- 9 September – Vusumuzi Mukweli. (MDC) Gokwe South.
- 15 September – Alexio Nyamadzawo. Wedza.
- 16 September – Fanuel Madzvimbo. Wedza.
- 18 September – Osbon Ziweni. (MDC) Masvingo.
- 27 September – Nyathi Mbuso. (ZNLWA) Nkayi.
- September – Felix Zava. (MDC) Headmaster. Chikomba.

=== October ===
- 15 October – Hilary Matema. Guruve South.
- 29 October – Limukani Lupahla (ZANU–PF) Lupane.
- 30 October – Mhondiwa Chitemerere. (MDC) Murehwa South.

=== November ===
- 5 November – Cain Nkala. (ZNLWA) Bulawayo.
- 10 November – Ravengai Sikhucha. (MDC) Mberengwa East.
- 11 November – Johannes Sikele. (Resettled farmer) Masvingo.
- 19 November – Kufa Rukara. (MDC) Silobela, Gokwe North.
- 24 November – Lameck Chemvura. (UZ Student) Manicaland.

=== December ===
- 6 December – Michael Mugodoki. (Farm Guard) Chikomba.
- 9 December – Augustus Chacha. (MDC) Gokwe.
- 20 December – Titus Nheya. (MDC) Karoi.
- 20 December – Milton Chambati (MDC) Magunge.
- 23 December – Trymore Midzi. (MDC) Bindura.
- 24 December – Rambisai Nyika (MDC) Gokwe South.
- 25 December – Willis Dhliwayo. (ZNLWVA) Chipinge North.
- 29 December – Moffat Soka Chiwaura (MDC) Bindura.
- 31 December – Shepherd Tigere. (MDC) Gokwe South.
- December – Laban Chiweta. (MDC) Bindura.
