= 1999 in Zimbabwe =

- Decades: 1970s; 1980s; 1990s; 2000s; 2010s
- See also: Other events of 1999; Timeline of Zimbabwean history

The following lists events that happened during 1999 in Zimbabwe.

== Incumbents ==
- President: Robert Mugabe
- First Vice President: Simon Muzenda
- Second Vice President: Joshua Nkomo (until 1 July), Joseph Msika (starting 1 July)

== Events ==
=== January ===
- January 7 – Zimbabwe said its military intervention in the Democratic Republic of the Congo was being funded by France, Libya and Angola.

=== September ===
- September – Movement for Democratic Change is founded.

== Deaths ==
=== July ===
- 1 July – Joshua Nkomo, politician (b. 1917)

=== August ===
- 4 August – John Chibadura, musician and songwriter (b. 1957)
