= Weaver Press =

Zimbabwean publishing company

- Founded: 1998; 27 years ago
- Founders: Irene Staunton and Murray McCartney
- Country of origin: Zimbabwe
- Headquarters location: Harare
- Key people: Irene Staunton (publisher); Murray McCartney (director); Njabulo Mbono (publishing assistant)
- Publication types: Books
- Official website: www.weaverpresszimbabwe.com

Weaver Press is a Zimbabwean independent publisher formed in 1998 in Harare. The press was co-founded by Irene Staunton, who has been credited with "quietly shaping post-independence Zimbabwean literature", with Murray McCartney, and the Press has published many notable African writers. Weaver's list focuses on books on political and social history, the environment, media issues, women's and children's rights, fiction and literary criticism.

== Background ==
Weaver was founded as an independent general publishing company, producing books by and about Zimbabwe, by Irene Staunton and her husband Murray McCartney in Harare in 1998. McCartney holds the role of director and Staunton is the publisher. Staunton has said: “Our role developed around the writers and their very particular, very significant voices. Weaver Press set out to publish ... very good fiction, and to try to ensure that some of the important academic research done in the country is made available to a wide readership."

Staunton previously co-founded the influential Baobab Books. In her role as publisher at both small presses, Staunton has been an important player in the dissemination of southern African literature - internationally, but also with a focus on making it locally accessible. According to the website of the African Books Collective, Weaver Press is committed to ensuring that "scholarship and creative writing are made available in their region of origin, and not only in foreign markets." In a 2021 interview, Staunton further stated that the company was "very aware of how often research is done in the country, but published outside, and we have endeavoured to make some of this material available in Zimbabwe."

Founding the company was a "challenging and interesting enterprise", Staunton has written, "with supportive sponsors ... in a developing country and in a new society full of hope." Following Zimbabwe's independence in 1980, publishers and bookshops flourished. “Donor funding flowed in support of textbook development and distribution into schools following the expansion of the education system," Staunton writes. The highly regarded Zimbabwe International Book Fair was also then still running.

== Challenges ==
However, Weaver Press was formed at the tail-end of this "heyday" for the industry, and at the start of a decline as political developments impacted the economy, resulting in a much diminished publishing environment. Weaver managed to remain somewhat insulated from the volatility of this period, Staunton explains: "To some extent ... Weaver has remained outside the juggernaut that has ridden over the industry because we have never published textbooks, the industry’s beating heart, and over the years we have continued to publish a few novels a year, some history and memoir, and many collections of short stories." Tinashe Mushakavanhu, a writer and literary scholar who worked for a period as a publishing assistant at Weaver and calls it "an ideal place to learn about publishing", wrote in 2017 of Staunton's influence: "Weaver Press has been the most active publishing concern in Zimbabwe in a struggling economy."

Nonetheless, the economic climate has taken its toll, with sales diminishing every year. Even literature texts prescribed for school and universities suffer poor sales. "In the poorer rural schools, perhaps there will be one photocopied text in the classroom held by the teacher, who will read the novel to the class ... We assume our titles are photocopied, pirated, or sold on and on from year to year, student to student," Staunton said in 2021. Moreover, while Zimbabwe has always produced writers with an international reputation, local publishers used to be able to sell the rights of locally published authors; now, however, "Our best writers can be offered advances that no local publisher could hope to recover in a lifetime. ... Fortunately, it often happens that they will then make a real effort to ensure that their books do become available locally and at a price that people can afford." The company currently publishes only three or four titles a year, and may cease to publish fiction altogether: "The market for it has disappeared and the costs of development are too high." Weaver continues to publish non-fiction, and also does work with NGOs, women's groups, trade unions and environmental agencies.

Despite the precarity of the publishing industry in Zimbabwe, Staunton believes firmly in its importance. In 2011, she wrote: "Good fiction is a valuable way of recording experience in all its diversity and shades of ambivalence; and I believe that every society should have access to, and be able to discuss and debate, academic theory and analysis –– this is how people remain informed, dynamic and able to robustly challenge the sweeping generalisations made by nationalist propagandists."

== Publications ==
Weaver Press has published work by some of Africa's most important literary names, including Chimamanda Ngozi Adichie, NoViolet Bulawayo, Brian Chikwava, Shimmer Chinodya, John Eppel, Petina Gappah, Alexandra Fuller, Tendai Huchu, Sarah Ladipo Manyika, Charles Mungoshi, Yvonne Vera, and others. As Tinashe Mushkavanhu writes: "It was the work of writers [Staunton] published that always occupied centre stage, winning international accolades, or getting translated." The company's fiction programme was developed with support from Dutch NGO Hivos, and currently includes more than 120 Zimbabwean short-story writers, who have featured in their anthologies. Weaver's non-fiction list focuses on history, politics, development, environmental issues and gender; they also produce e-books, literary criticism and children's literature.

Staunton has a lifelong interest in oral histories, particularly the voices of marginalised women and children: "I began asking myself, after independence: who is collecting the voices, the stories, of rural women? - women who had been pillars of strength for their families and communities during the war," she explained in a 2011 interview. Of her work with children, she has said: "Children have a lot to say when you stop to ask them; and I believe that having them write rather than speak provided them with a degree of freedom that they might not otherwise have felt."

These concerns are reflected in many Weaver books, including those edited by Staunton herself. In a 2009 review of the Weaver publication Women Writing Zimbabwe, Heather Hewitt wrote: "The publication of Women Writing Zimbabwe speaks to the resilience and resourcefulness of Zimbabweans, as well as to the vision of the founder of Weaver Press, who is still publishing books in Harare.… The truths of these stories invite us into different realities; it is up to us to accept their invitation."

An article in The Guardian published to mark the 25th anniversary since Staunton and McCartney set up their publishing business quoted scholar Tinashe Mushakavanhu as saying that Weaver Press has "quietly shaped post-independence Zimbabwean literature", while NoViolet Bulawayo, one of the most successful writers with whom they have worked, stated that Weaver Press "has always been at the centre of Zimbabwe's literary scene ever since its inception ... Weaver is essential, an institution".
