= Two Tone (magazine) =

- Editor: D. F. Middleton, Julius Chingono, Charles Mungoshi
- Frequency: Quarterly
- Founded: 1954
- Final issue: 1981
- Country: Zimbabwe
- Language: English, Ndebele, Shona

Published between 1954 and 1981 Two Tone was a quarterly of Rhodesian poetry magazine, which signified a radical break with the largely conservative Eurocentric academic traditions which until then had dominated Zimbabwean poetry. Publishing poetry by both black and white writers working, predominantly in English but also in Ndebele and Shona, it challenged divisions and created a new open field for expression in divergent poetic voices and styles.

== History and profile ==
Two Tone was launched in 1954. The founders were Phillippa Berlyn and Olive Robertson. While the magazine was published in association with the National Arts Foundation of Rhodesia and the University of Rhodesia's English Department the selection process was left to the journal's rotating board of editors, whose focus on "good writing," "technical skill," "stylistic innovation" and "authentic expression" provided a foundation for much of the groundbreaking new literature that exploded in Zimbabwe in the 1970.

In 1976 Kizito Zhiradzigo Muchemwa became the editor-in-chief of the magazine, being the first black editor. The magazine folded in 1981.

== Content and themes ==
Two Tone prioritised the author of the imagination rather than the revisionist historian or political revolutionary - a position which became increasing tenuous during the oppressive years of the Ian Smith regime. The magazine received scathing criticism from academics, political activist and many black poets who increasingly saw it as a "banal" and "pretentious outlet" for a closed minority of "White literati", whose "patronizing approach" to black writing supported the political status quo. The antagonism was only exacerbated by the publication of defensive editorials which argued that "separatism and elitism" create the assurances of liberty to "foster imaginative literature."

Despite the controversy, the journal's legacy is secured through the writing of seminal contemporary Zimbabwean poets such as D. F. Middleton, Julius Chingono, Charles Mungoshi, Bonus Zimunya, John Eppel, N. H. Brettell and Patricia Schonstein, all of whom began their literary careers on the pages of Two Tone.
