= A Son of the Soil =

1976 novel by Wilson Katiyo

- Author: Wilson Katiyo
- Language: English
- Genre: Bildungsroman
- Publisher: Rex Collings
- Publication date: 1976
- Publication place: Zimbabwe

A Son of the Soil is the debut novel written by Zimbabwean writer Wilson Katiyo. Published in 1976 by Rex Collings, it follows the life of a young boy, Alexio Shonga, who lives in Southern Rhodesia, the "self-governing" minority-ruled state that preceded independent Zimbabwe. The novel is a close representation of real events Katiyo faced growing up as a black Rhodesian ruled by a white society.

== Background ==
When Katiyo wrote the novel, he was studying in England, in exile as a political activist, while his country, then called Southern Rhodesia, was run by a white-minority government that repressed its African majority. The main character, Alexio, resembles Katiyo, in that he also runs into trouble with the Special Branch, the security force of the white Rhodesian government; like Katityo, he escapes Zimbabwe and, by way of Zambia, ends up in England.

Alexio comes from a well respected family. His grandfather was known in society for being a "medicine man" as well as a medium who communicates with ancestral spirits. His grandfather had three wives and seventeen children, one being his father who died shortly after Alexio's birth. As a result of his father's death, Alexio's mother is obligated to marry her husband's eldest brother. She hesitates, and consequently is beaten and banished from her village, unable to see her son. Most of the novel focuses on Alexio's life journey and education. He experiences hardships not only from white people, but a large part due to his own family.

== Plot ==
Alexio spends his earliest years in Makosa, an ancestral village, but then moves to Salisbury (later Harare, the country's capital) to live with his cousin who works as a servant for a white family. Alexio then becomes a farmer in Jena's village and is given the opportunity to be sent to school. Being successful in his studies, at age 12 he travels back to Salisbury to attend Goromonzi Secondary School, funded partially by an official of the African Party, which evidently is opposed to Rhodesia's minority rule.

In Salisbury he has two white teachers, Paul and Sarah Davies, who came to Rhodesia as volunteers, and this, plus the association with the African Party, gets Alexio in trouble with the police. They attempt to charge him with being a political activist and a communist, but fail. They then try to make him a police informer, but Alexio refuses and is harassed constantly. His only way to continue his education is to travel to England. This plan fails because once again, he is accused of being a communist while applying for a passport. Alexio is beat up and asked again if he wants to become a police informer. A black police officer grants Alexio some time to consider the offer, and it is here that Alexio escapes detention in order to become a guerrilla fighter.

== Themes and critique ==
A Son of the Soil depicts the racism prevalent during the oppression of the people of Southern Rhodesia and their move toward independence, but simultaneously expresses the hope for a better future, as an independent country after being a "self-governing" British colony; his last novel, Tsiga, expresses disillusionment with "the postcolonial betrayal of the new black leadership", the leadership he himself had fought for.

Govind Narain Sharma, summarizing and critiquing the novel for African Studies Review, noted that A Son of the Soil, as Katiyo's first published novel, could have done with better editing to avoid spelling and grammatical errors. But Katiyo, she said, is a "born storyteller" and the narrative is continuously interesting. Katiyo knows his materials well but still writes in a "detached and objective" way, and the novel (referred to as a Bildungsroman) is a "faithful and vivid portrayal of African society". According to Albert S. Gérard, "the author lacks the talent of imagination to flesh out his writing".

Scholar Robert Muponde commented on the novel's male main character and his "son of the soil" ideology, which is grounded in resistance against the colonial oppressor: in this and other novels the "male raconteur" is a story-teller who relates stories related to colonial oppression to younger men. This, according to Muponde, starkly contrasts the grounding of the female main characters in fellow Zimbabwean author Yvonne Vera's work, a fundamentally different and "gendered history".

== Editions and translations ==
The novel was turned into a play called Mavambo, First Steps, in 1984, and performed at the University of Zimbabwe to celebrate the opening of the university's drama program. It was published by "University Playscripts", with a foreword by Stephen Chifunyise, a high-ranking civil servant at the Ministry of Youth, Sport and Culture, who praised the play for its "uniquely Zimbabwean dramatic idiom".

Brigitte Angays-Katiyo translated the book into French, as La terre de Sekuru, in 1985.
