= 1998 in Zimbabwe =

- Decades: 1970s; 1980s; 1990s; 2000s; 2010s
- See also: Other events of 1998; Timeline of Zimbabwean history

The following lists events that happened during 1998 in Zimbabwe.

== Incumbents ==
- President: Robert Mugabe
- First Vice President: Simon Muzenda
- Second Vice President: Joshua Nkomo

== Events ==
=== August ===
- August 6 - Fighting spread across DRC and on borders with Rwanda, Uganda and Tanzania. Rwanda continued to deny involvement with the rebels and a summit was held in Zimbabwe discussing the conflict.
- August 8 - The talks failed to secure a truce of a ceasefire between the countries at the summit in Zimbabwe.
- August 10 - Military experts from Namibia, Zimbabwe, Zambia and Tanzania were due in Kinshasa later that week to investigate allegations of Rwandan and Ugandan troops being sent across the border.
- August 21 - South African President Nelson Mandela called for a summit over the Congo conflict on Saturday, inviting the leaders of DRC, Rwanda, Uganda and Zimbabwe to come.
- August 27 - After over two hundred civilians were reported to be killed by DRC rebels, Zimbabwe criticized countries that had been secretly aiding the rebels, who called for a ceasefire.

=== September ===
- September 3 - South Africa said it supported the intervention of DRC by Namibia, Zimbabwe and Angola which supported Kabila.

=== December ===
- December 4 - Zimbabwean President Robert Mugabe defended fighting for DRC, referred to the foreign involvement in Bosnian War.
- December 5 - The rebel leader said that Angolan and Zimbabwean troops had launched a counter-offensive against his troops in the northwest of the Democratic Republic of the Congo.
