= CZI =

CZI may refer to:

- Chan Zuckerberg Initiative, a limited liability company founded in the United States
- Confederation of Zimbabwe Industries, the primary organisation for industry in Zimbabwe
- Crazy Woman Creek, with FAA three-letter station designator CZI
