= Virginia Phiri =

Zimbabwean feminist writer (born 1954)

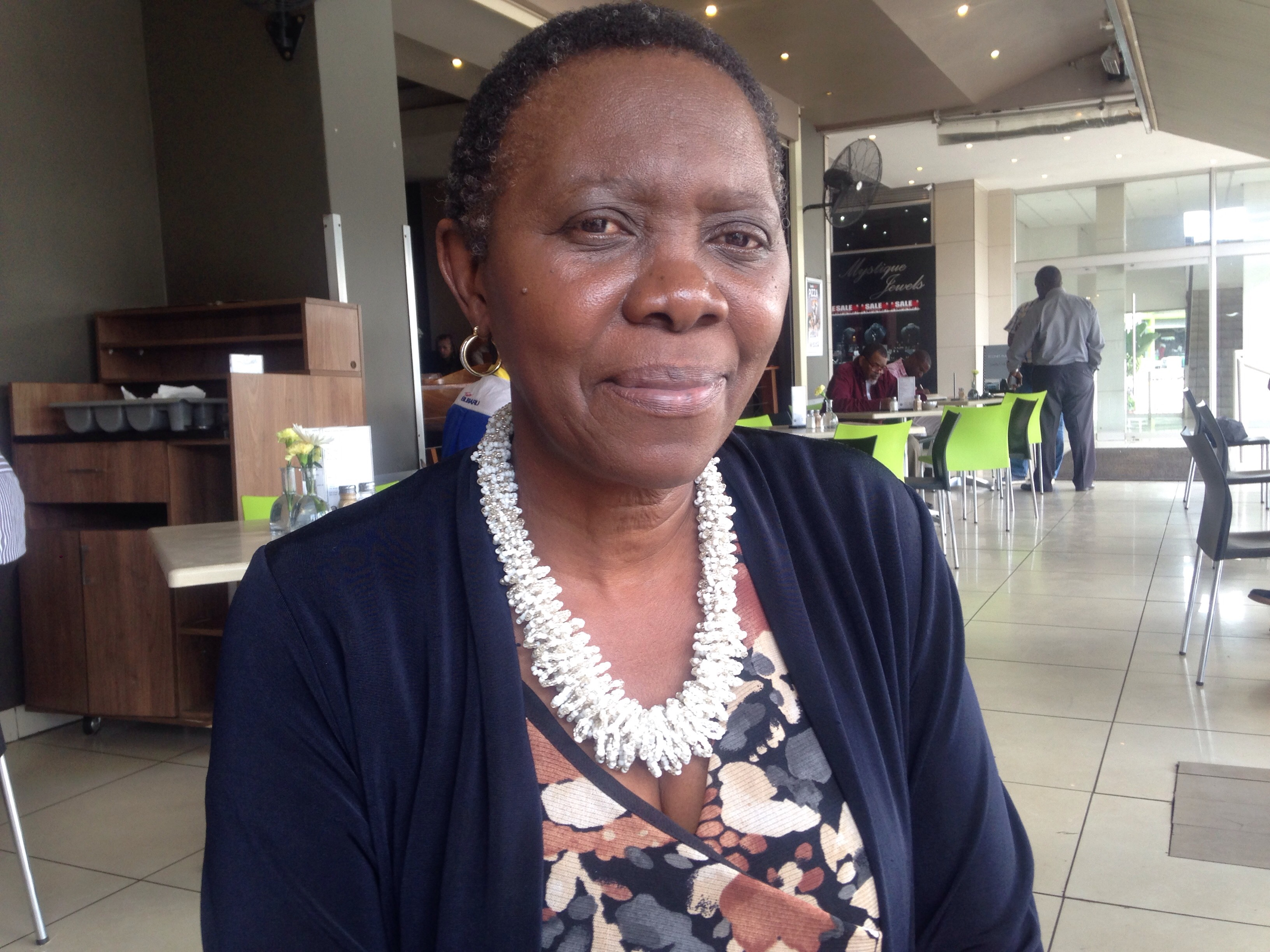
- Born: 1954 (age 71–72); Bulawayo, Zimbabwe
- Occupation: Author
- Notable work: Published : Destiny (Corals Services, 2006), Highway Queen (Corals Services, 2010), Desperate (Xavier F Carelse, 2002 & 2013)

Virginia Phiri (born 1954) is a Zimbabwean feminist writer.

== Early life ==
Virginia Phiri was born in 1954 in Zimbabwe's second largest city, Bulawayo.

Having been raised in a family of political activists aligned to the Zimbabwe African Peoples Union, she was actively involved in the Zimbabwe's liberation war at the age of 17. Later, in 2000, together with Zimbabwe Women Writers she contributed to an anthology, Women of Resilience – the voices of women ex-combatants. In 1972, she left the country for neighbouring Botswana on the way to Zambia.

Phiri is married to Werner Fibeck. Their only child a daughter named Tecla, died 2001. Apart from being an author Phiri is an accountant by profession, as well as an African orchid expert. She has co-authored orchid articles in journals such as Die Orchidee since 1996. Due to her African orchids research and writing she was an IUCN Africa Committee member up to 2012 and is currently a member of IUCN Species Survival Commission.

== Career ==
Phiri has written both fiction and non-fiction books in English, and in two of Zimbabwe's local languages, chiShona and isiNdebele. She is founder of Zimbabwe Women Writers (1990) and Zimbabwean Academic and Non Fiction Authors Association (1996). She was a board member of the Zimbabwe International Book Fair from 1998 until 2004, when she stepped down. Over the years, she has built on her career as an author through active membership of various writing organisations and associations.

These include:

- The Zimbabwean Academic and Non-Fiction Authors Association which she founded in 1996
- The Zimbabwe Women's Writers, an organisation that she founded in 1990 with other Zimbabwean writers that include Barbara Makhalisa one of the first Zimbabwean women to be published and Flora Veit-Wild, who published a biography of the late Zimbabwean author Dambudzo Marechera.
- The Zimbabwe–German Society, which she also founded in 1983, and remains an active member
- The Zimbabwe International Book Fair Trust, whose board she sat between 1998 and 2004
- The Pamberi Trust, where she was remained active till the time of the closure of its popular entity, the Book Cafe in 2015
- Women Writing Africa - Southern African Region where she is an associate editor team member

== Works ==
In Zimbabwe, Phiri's writings have been criticised as mainly dealing with mainly risqué issues. Some of her most controversial subjects include the experiences of sex workers, a trade outlawed in Zimbabwe. These writings were published in two anthologies by the Zimbabwe Women Writers in Shona, Masimba and a version in isiNdebele. 7

Her most popular published works include:

Destiny (Corals Services, 2006). A book on Destiny that deals with a subject that is viewed as taboo in Zimbabwe - Hermaphrodites (LGBTI community) and their everyday reality.

Highway Queen (Corals Services, 2010). A book that touches on the daily global challenges of unemployment, poverty, crime, health, education, and economics from a woman's perspective.

Desperate (2002) (Xavier F Carelse, 2002 and 2013). A collection of stories about the circumstances that lead women to commercial sex workers, and their lived experiences. The book was inspired by a real life experience as a guerrilla during the Rhodesian Bush War, when she sought refuge with sex workers when she found her life was at risk owing to her activism.

Phiri's writings have been used for academic university purposes in Zimbabwe and the world over for research as well for Doctorates. In 2006, Desperate was discussed by students from Prof. Ruby Magosvongwe's English class before examinations. That gave Virginia Phiri an opportunity to interact with students and discuss Desperate at length.University of Zimbabwe Department of English in its courses.

In 2012 at the Cape Town Book Fair Phiri had an opportunity to speak to students from the Universities of Cape Town and Stellenbosch in relation to her book Destiny, which addresses LGBTIQ issues. The South African students were led by Professor Meg Samuelson. Also present were Zimbabwean academics Professor Kizito Muchemwa and Professor Faith Mkwesha, who were at that time based in South Africa. Destiny (2006) is one of the few books that has addressed LGBTIQ issues.

In 2014, German publisher Peter Hammer Veerlag commissioned her to contribute to the book Visionare Afrikas on the first black African woman Nobel Peace Prize winner, Professor Wangari Maathai. Her contribution was translated into German.

Phiri went into self-publishing following encouragement by the late University of Zimbabwe lecturer Dr Xavier Carelse, who noted that she had struggled to have her book Desperate published due to the taboo issue of sex work. He later partnered her in publishing it.

== Family ==
Virginia Phiri is married to Werner Fibeck. Their daughter Tecla died tragically in 2001.
