= Valerie Tagwira =

Zimbabwean writer

- Born: Valerie Joan Tagwira; Gweru, Zimbabwe
- Education: University of Zimbabwe; Royal College of Obstetricians and Gynaecologists
- Occupations: Writer; obstetrician-gynaecologist
- Notable work: The Uncertainty of Hope (2006)
- Awards: National Arts Merit Awards Outstanding Fiction Book
- Website: valerietagwira.wordpress.com

Valerie Tagwira is a Zimbabwean writer who is a specialist obstetrician-gynaecologist by profession. Her debut novel The Uncertainty of Hope, published in 2006 by Weaver Press, won the 2008 National Arts Merit Awards (NAMA) Outstanding Fiction Book.

== Early life ==
Valerie Joan Tagwira was born in the city of Gweru, in central Zimbabwe, but lived for most of her childhood in Rutendo (Redcliff), a town in the Midlands Province. She attended Monte Cassino Secondary School in Macheke and St James High School in Nyamandhlovu. She graduated in 1997 from the University of Zimbabwe's Medical School, and subsequently studied at the Royal College of Obstetricians and Gynaecologists while working in London, UK.

Her first novel, The Uncertainty of Hope – which is set in Mbare, a suburb of Harare, Zimbabwe, and, as she has described it, "is all about the day-to-day nitty-gritty during the hard times of 2005" – was written during the time when she was in England, between 2002 and 2010, travelling home twice a year.

== Writing ==
The Uncertainty of Hope, published in 2006 by Weaver Press, received widespread favourable reviews. Percy Zvomuya in the Mail & Guardian wrote: "Tagwira's book is a celebration of urban sisterhood and abiding relationships that withstand the deprivations of harsh, life-negating policies." According to reviewer Annie Gagiano, "the overwhelming, lingering and realistic impression left by this work is of lives lived under extreme difficulty, but faced with immense courage, dignity and the vital support of caring friendship among women. It is, indeed, a highly accomplished first novel and a valuable addition to the African literary archive, however painful it may be to read its many harrowing moments." Writing in The Standard newspaper, Bertha Shoko concluded: "This is a 'must read' for anyone with a passion for good literature. Tagwira manages to make me angry, happy, hopeful, and hopeless, as she narrates this touching story about Zimbabwe". Charles Mungoshi in The Herald said the novel was a welcome addition to the canon of Zimbabwean literature, while the reviewer for The Zimbabwean, calling the book "satisfying and thought-provoking", was reminded of award-winning Ghanaian writer Ama Ata Aidoo's novel Changes.

The Uncertainty of Hope won the National Arts Merit Award (NAMA) for literature in 2008, and is studied by Advanced-Level students as part of the Zimbabwe School Examinations Council (ZIMSEC) English Literature curriculum.

Tagwira also writes poetry and short stories. She is included in the anthologies Writing Mystery and Mayhem (Weaver Press, 2015), edited by Irene Staunton, and New Daughters of Africa, edited by Margaret Busby.

== Bibliography ==
=== Novels ===
- The Uncertainty of Hope (2006). Weaver Press

=== Anthology appearances ===
- Writing Mystery and Mayhem (2015). Weaver Press
