= Monte Cassino Girls High School =

School in Zimbabwe

Monte Cassino Girls High School chapel

Monte Cassino Girls High School is a Catholic boarding-school in the Mashonaland East province of Zimbabwe.

== History ==
The school was founded as part of the Catholic Mission at Monte Cassino in 1902, when Trappist monks selected a farm near the Macheke Siding and established the Monte Cassino Mission. It was built between two mountain ranges, with its entrance coming in from the west side after crossing the Mucheke River, 7 km south-east of Macheke.

A day and boarding school for boys was opened in 1908 and the following year, the monks formed the Missionary Order of Mariannhill.

Like many mission schools in Zimbabwe, Monte Cassino was one of the first schools which provided education to Black African people.

Jesuits took possession of Monte Cassino in 1929. The Sisters of the Precious Blood (Baden) returned and assumed administration of the school in the 1960s.

In 1996, Ampleforth monks from the English Benedictine Congregation arrived at the mission and established the Monastery of Christ the Word.

== Current activities ==
There are four houses at the school: Nightingale, Boeckenhoff, Pfanner and Kizito.

In 2017, it was ranked as one of the top ten boarding schools in Zimbabwe, based on O-level and A-level results.

== Controversy ==
In 2019, 145 pupils walked four miles from the school to Macheke police station to register complaints over sexual harassment and ill-treatment at the school. The education ministry then launched an investigation which found evidence of harassment by both male and female staff.

== Notable alumnae ==
- Joana Mamombe, politician
- Valerie Tagwira, writer and obstetrician-gynecologist
