= Norma Kitson =

South African political activist

Norma Cranko Kitson (18 August 1933 – 12 June 2002) was a South African political activist. She participated in the fight against apartheid in South Africa.

== Early life ==
Norma Belle Cranko was born in Berea, Durban, into a wealthy Jewish family. Her father was a chemist; her mother Millie Stiller Cranko was an immigrant from Poland. Ballet dancer John Cranko was her cousin.

== Career ==
At the age of 14, she went to work as a secretary. She joined the South African Communist Party in the 1950s and became a printer for the cause. After her husband was jailed in 1964, she left South Africa with her children and settled in London.

In 1973, Kitson founded “Red Lion Setters,” a typesetting collective that operated out of Gray’s Inn Road. Founded after Kitson was fired for attempting to unionize at a previous typesetting job, Red Lion Setters worked for and donated to many different socialist and feminist groups and remained operational until the late 1980’s, leveraging typesetting to contribute heavily to the anti-apartheid movement. In 1982, Red Lion Setters led the successful campaign to free Kitsons son from detainment in South Africa.

She was often to be found protesting apartheid in Trafalgar Square, in front of South Africa House, as part of the City of London Anti-Apartheid Group, which she founded.

After the end of apartheid, the Kitsons were recognized by the African National Congress as veterans of the cause. She was secretary of Zimbabwe Women Writers late in her life, and wrote a creative writing textbook during that time.

== Personal life ==
Norma Cranko married a World War II veteran, mechanical engineer Dave Kitson. They had two children, Stephen and Amandla; they divorced while Dave was serving a long prison sentence. She remarried in 1973, to choreographer Sidney Cherfas, and divorced again; then remarried her first husband after his freedom in 1984. In 1986, she published an autobiography, Where Sixpence Lives.

She moved to Harare, Zimbabwe, after 1994. Norma Kitson died from emphysema in 2002, aged 68 years.

In 2011 she was honoured by the Republic of Sierra Leone by a postage stamp issued for her in their series Legendary Heroes of Africa.
