= Flora Veit-Wild =

German literary academic

- Born: May 18, 1947 (age 79); Wiesbaden, West Germany
- Employer(s): Humboldt University of Berlin (Professor of African Literatures and Cultures, 1994–2012; now Emerita Professor)
- Known for: Scholarship on African literature; memoir They Called You Dambudzo; relationship with Dambudzo Marechera
- Spouse: Victor Wild (divorced)
- Partner: Dambudzo Marechera (1980s)

Academic background
- Education: University of Frankfurt (PhD Anglistik, 1991)

Academic work
- Notable works: They Called You Dambudzo: A Memoir (2020); founder member of Zimbabwe Women Writers; literary executor of Marechera’s estate

Flora Veit-Wild (born 18 May 1947) is a German literary academic, Professor of African Literatures and Cultures at Humboldt University, Berlin. She has published on the Zimbabwean writer Dambudzo Marechera, and on the body and madness in African literature.

== Life ==
Flora Wild was born in West Germany in 1947, and originally studied French and German languages and literature at university.

She first met Dambudzo Marechera in Harare in 1983 in the office of writer and editor Charles Mungoshi. Veit-Wild and Marachera had a relationship, and remained close friends until his death in 1987. Veit-Wild lived in Zimbabwe from 1983 to 1993. In 1986 she met Dieter Riemenschneider in Harare, who subsequently supervised a PhD dissertation by Veit-Wild on the social history of Zimbabwean literature, which she gained in Anglistik from Frankfurt University in 1991. She was a founder member of Zimbabwe Women Writers and of the Dambudzo Marechera Trust.

In 1994 Veit-Wild became professor of African literatures and cultures at the African Studies Department, Humboldt University of Berlin, where she is now Emeritus Professor of African Literature.

In her early fifties, Veit-Wild was diagnosed with Non-Hodgkin lymphoma, an HIV-related cancer.

The academic Agnieszka Piotrowska made a 2014 film about Veit-Wild's relationship with Marechera, Flora and Dambudzo.

Veit-Wild's memoir They Called You Dambudzo was published in November 2020.

== Works ==
- (ed.) The Black Insider. Harare: Baobab Books.
- Teachers, Preachers, Non-Believers: A Social History of Zimbabwean Literature. London; New York; Hans Zell Publishers, 1992.
- (ed.) Cemetery of Mind: Collected Poems of Dambudzo Marechera by Dambudzo Marechera. Harare, Zimbabwe: Baobab Books, 1992.
- Dambudzo Marechera: a source book on his life and work. London; New York: Hans Zell, 1992.
- (ed.) Scrapiron blue by Dambudzo Marechera. Harare: Baobab Books, 1994.
- (ed. with Anthony Chennell) Emerging perspectives on Dambudzo Marechera. Asmara: Africa World Press, 1998.
- (ed. with Dirk Naguschewski) Body, Sexuality, and Gender. New York: Rodopi, 2005.
- (ed. with Alain Ricard) Interfaces between the oral and the written / Interfaces entre l'écrit et l'oral. New York: Rodopi, 2005.
- Writing Madness: Borderlines of the Body in African Literature. Oxford: James Currey, 2006.
- They Called You Dambudzo: A Memoir. Jacana Media Ltd, 2020.
