= Nyatsime College =

Nyatsime College in Harare Province, Zimbabwe is the country's first technical college specifically for African students. It opened in 1962, as the brainchild of educator and activist Stanlake J. W. T. Samkange, in what was then Southern Rhodesia. At the time no such school for African students existed, and Samkange had already started fundraising for the school in 1951.

The school, designed to be run by African administrators and faculty for African students, was modelled on Tuskegee University in Alabama, USA; the opening dedication was attended by Luther H. Foster Jr., then Tuskegee's president.

== Controversy ==
In Nov 2019, Cops investigated reports of sexual abuse cases filed by the students against the college staff.

== Notable people ==
- Samuel Chimsoro
- Julius Chingono
