= Butterfly Burning =

Zimbabwean novel by Yvone Vera

First edition (publ. African Books Collective)

Butterfly Burning is a novel by Zimbabwean writer Yvonne Vera that was first published on January 1, 1998. Set in the late 1940s, it is about the voice of the people under colonialism in Zimbabwe. It is a romantic story that follows the life of construction worker Fumbatha, who falls in love with Phephelaphi, a much younger woman.

== Synopsis ==
Phephelaphi seems to view Fumbatha as though in a fantasy world, as she wades out of the waterway in the township of Makokoba. The two fall in love, but Phephelaphi soon tires of his devotion, even while living with him. Prior to her mother's murder, Phephelaphi studied to become self-sufficient. After gaining a position at a neighbourhood nursing school, she learns she is pregnant and no longer qualified for the class. Therefore, she induces an abortion to be able to apply for the program. Questioning his love for her, he ends up cheating on her. At some point, he later admits to an affair with another woman.

== Characters ==
There are two main characters in this novel:

Phephelaphi: A young, independent, educated woman with ambition and dreams. Her mother was killed by her ex-lover, a white policeman. She lives with her mother's friends, but soon leaves to live with Fumbatha. She gains a nursing position, but then finds out that she is pregnant and decides to perform her own abortion.

Fumbatha: A middle-aged male construction worker who is relatively poor. He falls in love with Phephelaphi, and they live together in a one-bedroom apartment. Tension between the couple arises when Fumbatha finds out that Phephelaphi plans on performing her own abortion.

At the end she sets herself on fire as Fumbatha enters their house.

== Reception ==
Butterfly Burning received enthusiastic critical attention, with World Literature Today describing it as "richly poetic while also brutally realistic...a compelling work of fiction", and Michelle Cliff writing in the Voice Literary Supplement: "Vera explodes myths of womanhood and romance, and realistically and unsentimentally depicts the price women may pay for their longing to become someone, to decolonize themselves." In 2002, the novel received a German literary award, LiBeraturpreis. In 2003, the book was selected for special recognition for a foreign author in the Italian Premio Feronia-Citta di Fiano award. It was identified as one of Africa’s 100 Best Books of the 20th Century in 2002, by a collaborative project involving several African literary organisations.
