= N. H. Brettell =

- Born: Noel Harry Brettell; 3 July 1908; Lye, West Midlands
- Died: 29 November 1991; Zimbabwe
- Education: University of Birmingham
- Occupation: Writer
- Known for: Poetry
- Spouse: Eva Gertrude Scovell (m. 1934; died 1984)
- Children: 2

N.H. Brettell (3 July 1908 - 29 November 1991) was a British-Zimbabwean poet and writer. His poetry collection, Bronze Frieze: Poems Mostly Rhodesian was published by Oxford University Press in 1950. The South African poet Douglas Livingstone remarked that Brettell was the best poet writing in the region. Brettell was awarded the Book Centre / P.E.N. Centre of Rhodesia Annual Literary Prize in 1972 and 1978.

== Background ==
Brettell was born in 1908 in Lye, West Midlands and attended the grammar school King Edward VI College, Stourbridge. In 1930 he graduated with a first-class honours Degree in English at the University of Birmingham where he published his earlier poems in the University Gazette. After graduating he took up a teaching position at Ruzawi School in Southern Rhodesia. He returned to England in 1932 to teach at Bishop Auckland Grammar School and to enroll in a teaching diploma at the University of Birmingham and teach. He returned to Southern Rhodesia permanently in 1934 and taught in government schools for the next twenty five years.

His poetry appeared in several anthologies, including A Book of South African Verse (London: Oxford University Press, 1959) and P.E.N 1960: New South African Writing and a Survey of Fifty Years of Creative Achievement (1960). His poems also appeared in Rhodesian Poetry, the periodical of the Poetry Society of Rhodesia (founded in 1950), New Coin, Rhodes University's poetry magazine (founded in 1964), Poetry Review Salisbury and Two Tone. In an academic review (1978) of Rhodesian poetry, Graham Robin wrote that “Brettell puts into words the halting stupefaction of the exile in such a new and strange land. At last Rhodesia has a poet possessed by his country; but amazed, almost reluctantly possessed."

=== Works ===
- Bronze Frieze: Poems Mostly Rhodesian (London: Oxford University Press, 1950)
- Some Poems 1963 / The Owl and the Ivy (1963)
- Season and Festival (1965)
- One Year (1969)
- Lakeside: Sebakwe and Ngesi (1976)
- And Underfoot September (1977)
- Recessional (1981)
- Side-Gate and Stile (Harare: Books of Rhodesia, 1981)
- Molony, Rowland; David Wright; John Eppel; N.H. Brettell (1982). Four Voices: Poetry From Zimbabwe. ISBN 978-0-86920-259-3.
- Letters from England (1985)
- Eva: 1986 (1986)
- England Revisited (1990)
- Selected Poems (Cape Town: Snailpress, 1994)

== Personal life ==
In 1934 he married Eva Scovell, a British colleague at Ruzawi School. The couple had two children together; John (b.1935-2026) and Rosemary (b.1938). In 1941 he befriended Arthur Shearly Cripps, an Anglican priest and poet. In 1979, the final year of the Rhodesian Bush War, the couple's home in Inyanga was attacked and destroyed by insurgents. They subsequently moved to Kadoma where their son was living. In 1984, the couple's car was rammed by a bus in Kadoma, injuring Eva, who died a few days later. Brettell died in 1991. His funeral was held at the Cathedral of St Mary and All Saints, Harare.
