= Dorothy Elizabeth Finn =

British teacher and poet (1928–2022)

Dorothy Elizabeth Finn (née Borrell; 10 July 1928 – 20 March 2022) was a British teacher and poet in Southern Rhodesia. She published poetry as D. E. Borrell, and other writing as D. E. Finn.

== Life and career ==
Born in South Hetton, County Durham on 10 July 1928, Borrell grew up in the mining village of Hetton-le-Hole. She gained a scholarship to Houghton-le-Spring Grammar School. After the war she studied at Durham University, and followed a sister in emigrating to Rhodesia. There she worked as a teacher.

Borrell married fellow poet Hugh Finn, and the couple "tirelessly promoted poetry in Rhodesia". Poetry in Rhodesia: 75 Years (1968) was the first of two anthologies edited by her. The book "was the first anthology that gave biographical details of the contributors and annotated local references that helped make the poems accessible to readers who were not Rhodesian." Her own collection A Patch of Sky was published in 1979 as part of the Mopani Poets Series, brought out by the Poetry Society of Rhodesia.

In 2000, she was forced to leave Zimbabwe. She gave film of her family life in Southern Rhodesia and Zimbabwe to the Imperial War Museum. Finn died in Scotland on 20 March 2022, aged 93.

== Works ==
- (ed.) Poetry in Rhodesia: 75 Years. Salisbury: The College Press, 1968.
- 'Arthur Shearly Cripps: An Assessment', Zambezia: a journal of social studies in Southern and Central Africa, Vol. 1, No. 2, 1970.
- (ed.) Beneath a Rhodesian Sky. Salisbury: Graham Publishing, 1972.
- A Patch of Sky: Selected Poems of D. E. Borrell. Poetry Society of Rhodesia, 1979. Ed. Hugh Finn. Mopani Poets Series. Bound together with Zimbabwe Ruins by Musaemura B. Zimunya.
- Letter: Meaning of Art, New Scientist, 22 January 2014.
