= Barbara Makhalisa =

Zimbabwean writer (born 1949)

Dr. Barbara Makhalisa
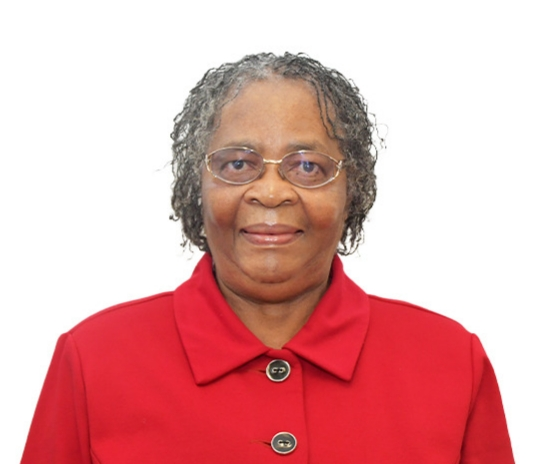
- Born: Barbara Clara Makhalisa-Moyo; 1949 (age 76–77); Zimbabwe
- Other names: Barbara Nkala
- Occupations: Teacher, novelist, publisher, editor
- Spouse: Shadreck Nkala
- Children: Three
- Website: www.barbarankala.com

Barbara Makhalisa (born 1949), also known by her married name as Barbara Nkala, is a teacher, Zimbabwean writer, Ndebele translator, novelist, editor and publisher, one of the earliest female writers published in Zimbabwe. She is the author of several books written in Ndebele, as well as in English, of which some have been used as school textbooks. Barbara is married to Shadreck Nkala. They have three adult children and six grandchildren.

== Biography ==
Barbara Clara Makhalisa was born in Zimbabwe, and studied at Gweru Teachers' College, majoring in Ndebele and English ("at a time when everything colonial was considered to be more superior").

Her writing career began when she won a national competition with her first book, Qilindini, a detective thriller written in Ndebele, at which time she was only the second female writer in Ndebele. Her second book, the Ndebele novel Umendo ("Marriage Is A Gamble", 1977, Mambo Press, 1977), is considered a classic. She has said: "I feel people should write in their mother tongue.... Our whole culture is stored in language, and literature is the storehouse for culture."

Her writing in English includes The Underdog and Other Stories (Mambo Press, 1984) and Eva's Song: A Collection of Short Stories (Harper Collins, 1996). Her story "Different Values" appears in Margaret Busby's 1992 anthology Daughters of Africa.

In 1981 she became an editor for the publishers Longman Zimbabwe. In 1991 she left Longman and worked with her husband in the family company for five years before being invited to head International Bible Society Zimbabwe (IBS Zimbabwe) as a national director in Malawi and Zimbabwe. she coordinated the translation and publishing of the new IBS Shona and Ndebele Bibles, as well as Chichewa New Testament. She left IBS in 2005. She now runs a company called Radiant Publishing Company, whose vision is to publish for transformation.

In 2015, she received an honorary degree from the National University of Science and Technology (NUST) in Bulawayo.

Nkala is an active member of the Brethren In Christ Church in Zimbabwe. As an elder in her church, she has sat in a number of humanitarian boards. Her influence in the church has mentored many young people to write their stories and many have been published in the Good Words/Amazwi Amahle in Zimbabwe. She is the Mennonite World Conference Regional Representative Southern Africa covering South Africa, Mozambique, Malawi, Zambia, and Zimbabwe. Nkala and other women were featured in Doris Dube's Silent Labourers.

== Works ==
=== Fiction ===
- Qilindini (Cheat! Ndebele, novel 1974, Longman Zimbabwe)
- Umendo ( Marriage is a gamble. Ndebele, novel, 1977, Mambo Press)
- Umhlaba lo! (What a world!; Ndebele, 1977, Mambo Press)
- Impilo yinkinga (Life is a Mystery, Ndebele novel, 1984, Mambo Press)
- The Underdog and Other Stories, Mambo Press, 1984 (ISBN 978-0869223345)
- Calfy Says (Children's stories, 1991, Longman Zimbabwe)
- Eva's Song, Harper Collins, 1996 (ISBN 978-1779040114)
- Beasty Bones and other Baddies (Children's instructions on Health story, 1991, Longman Zimbabwe)
- Ujojojo KaMaNtombi (Ndebele Children's story, 1991, Longman Zimbabwe)
- Woza Lazo (co-authored, Ndebele infant Rhymes 1991, Longman Zimbabwe)
- Primary Ndebele Texts for schools Grade 6 and 7. Longman Zimbabwe
- Various English and Ndebele poems and short stories (Zimbabwe Women Writers Anthology, 1994)
- Vus' Inkophe/Masimba, 1997
- The Book Fair Book, 1993
- Giya Giya (Poetry, 1990)

=== As editor or publisher ===
- Celebrating the Vision: A Century of Sowing and Reaping, Baptist Publishing House, 1998
- Rainbow After a Storm: Stories of Loss, Grief & Healing, Radiant, 2008
- Thaph' uluju: iqoqo lezindatshana, ilifa lakho, 2010
- Sithini IsiNdebele? by Issac N Mpofu, 2011
- Izinyawo Zayizolo by Tsitsi Nomsa Ngwenya, 2016
- Umkhosi Wenhliziyo by Olivia M. Sibanda, 2020
- Uhambo Lwempilo by Lindani Phiri, 2020

=== Other books ===
- Inkondlo (Selection of Poems by Zimbabwe Women Writers)
- Golide: Gogo Khokho, lived, loved and left a legacy, Radiant, 2011
- Growing and Branching out: Brethren in Christ Church in Zimbabwe and southern Africa, Radiant, 2014
- Umusa Wansuku zonke: Ugwalo 2, Radiant 2006
- Preface to Isichazamazwi SesiNdebele (Ndebele Dictionary) 2001 by African Languages Research Institute, UZ Harare

== Achievements and awards ==
- PHd from NUST
- 40 National Arts Merit Awards (NAMA) Legends Award
