= Wilson Katiyo =

Zimbabwean novelist

Wilson Katiyo (1947–2003) was a novelist from Zimbabwe. He published two novels, and died while working on a third. He is considered a writer of the second generation of pre-independence Zimbabwe.

== Biography ==
Katiyo was born in Mutoko, in what was then Southern Rhodesia—now Zimbabwe. His early education was done at Fletcher High School, but was later completed in England.

In his younger years while living in Rhodesia, Katiyo was involved in political activities and received harassment from police officers. With Rhodesia's Unilateral Declaration of Independence from Britain in 1965 declared, Katiyo fled to Europe.

He studied chemistry in Europe at London University's Queen Mary College. From that, he also lived in France and Switzerland. He later returned to Zimbabwe for work as a chemist and film producer in House of Hunger alongside Chris Austin. Post-independence, Katiyo also worked with the government as a civil servant in the office of the Ministry of Information.

Wilson Katiyo died in 2003 from cancer.

== Career ==
Katiyo published his first novel, A Son of the Soil, in 1976. According to Charles Larson, this novel highlighted the European invasion and the tyranny of white police officers over African countries. It also contained the childhood to adulthood of a young boy living in a racially segregated society. Sequel to A Son of the Soil, Katiyo published his second novel, Going to Heaven, in 1979. Continuing the plot of the first, Going to Heaven features the main character's escape to England with the help of a sympathizing white couple. It is here that the character experiences being a black minority living in England.

== Works ==
- Son of the Soil (1976)
- Going to Heaven (1979)
