= Samuel Chimsoro =

Zimbabwean poet and novelist (1949–2016)

Samuel Chimsoro (13 February 1949 – 6 July 2016) was a Zimbabwean poet and novelist who published in both English and Shona.

== Early life and education ==
Chimsoro was born on 13 February 1949, in Mrewa in the Mashonaland East Province of Zimbabwe (then known as Rhodesia). He attended Nyatsime College, the first privately black owned secondary school in Zimbabwe. He then trained as a laboratory technician with a focus on radiation detection. He worked for the government of Zimbabwe before moving to the National University of Science and Technology (NUST).

== Career ==
Chimsoro published his first volume of poetry, Smoke and Flames, in 1978. In the same year he published a Shona-language short story, "Hoyiyo ne Hohwa", which would later be used for instruction in primary schools. These were followed by Nothing is Impossible, a novel inspired by the life of Paul Mukondo, in 1983, and the Shona poetry collection Dama rekutanga: muunganidzwa wenhetembo (Dama rekutanga: the first promise) in 1990. Chimsoro's works deal with themes of colonialism, racial discrimination, and Zimbabwean politics.

== Death ==
Chimsoro died on 6 July 2016 in Umgugu Village, Zhombe, Zimbabwe.

== Bibliography ==
- Smoke and Flames: Poems (Mambo Press, 1978)
- Nothing is Impossible (Longman, 1983)
- Dama rekutanga: muunganidzwa wenhetembo (College Press, 1990)
