= Freedom Nyamubaya =

Freedom Nyamubaya (1958? – 5 July 2015) was a poet, dancer, farmer, feminist, and revolutionary from Zimbabwe. She is known as one of Zimbabwe's celebrated "guerilla fighter-poets", with two published collections of her poems. During the Rhodesian Bush War, she served as one of the few female field operation commanders. In 1979, she was elected Secretary for Education at the first conference of the Zimbabwe African National Union (ZANU) Women’s League.

== Early life and activism ==
Born in Uzumba in Mashonaland East, Nyamubaya left secondary school at the age of 15 to join the Zimbabwe African National Liberation Army (ZANLA) during its insurgency against Rhodesia's predominantly white government. She travelled to a ZANLA training camp in Mozambique, believing she could "change something". During the Rhodesian Bush War, she was one of the few female field operation commanders; although after the war, she felt let down by the way demobilised guerrillas were treated. She went on to become Secretary for Education at the first conference of the Zimbabwe African National Union (ZANU) Women’s League.

== Post-independence ==
After Zimbabwe’s independence in 1980, Nyamubaya remained active in work for the empowerment and rights of Zimbabweans. In the mid 1980s she founded the civil society organization Management Outreach Training Services for Rural and Urban Development (MOSTRUD) in Marondera, Zimbabwe. The initial aim was to help refugees and people who had been displaced as a result of the war for independence by providing rehabilitation, reintegration and training in agricultural skills to support livelihoods. She continued to lead the organization until her death, integrating a particular focus on rural development, agricultural support and theatre for women and young people.

== Writing and performance ==
Freedom Nyamubaya has two published collections of poems, On the Road Again: Poems During and After the National Liberation of Zimbabwe (Zimbabwe Publishing House, 1985), and Dusk of Dawn (College Press, 1995). She co-authored Ndangariro with Irene Ropa Rinopfuka Mahamba (Zimbabwe Foundation for Education with Production, 1987). Her short story “Special Place” is published in the anthology Writing Still: New Stories from Zimbabwe (Weaver Press, 2003).

In her poem ‘Introduction’, which opens On the Road Again, Nyamubaya expressed her commitment to continue to fight against injustice after the end of the bush war:

Now that I have put my gun down
For almost obvious reasons
The enemy still is here invisible
My barrel has no definite target
Now
Let my hands work –
My mouth sing –
My pencil write –
About the same things my bullet
aimed at.

Nyamubaya was a featured poet in literature festivals and events in Africa and abroad, including Poetry Africa on Tour, September 2010 in Harare, Zimbabwe, and the 18th International Poetry Festival of Medellín in Colombia in 2008.

Nyamubaya was passionate about traditional mbira music, and performed as a dancer onstage, including with internationally renowned musician Thomas Mapfumo.
