= Merna Wilson =

Daphne Merna Wilson, who wrote as Merna Wilson, was a Zimbabwean journalist, poet and novelist. She became active as a writer in pre-independence Rhodesia.

== Life ==
Merna Wilson was born in Kwekwe and educated at Mutare High School. She was a correspondent for African World from 1965 to 1967, and later worked as a buyer.

The plot of Wilson's first novel Explosion (1966) depicted nationalist politics playing out in a mining compound. The novel, typically for white Rhodesians at the time, treated nationalist leaders as cynically power-hungry rather than having popular legitimacy. The book gave a fictional portrayal of Terrence Ranger as 'Professor Granger', a pro-Communist manipulator of liberal opinion outside Rhodesia.

Wilson won the Rhodesian P.E.N. award in 1978. She was on the editorial board of Two Tone.

== Works ==
- Explosion. London: Robert Hale, 1966. Novel.
- Turn the Tide Gently. London: Robert Hale, 1967. Novel.
- Reap the Whirlwind. London: Robert Hale, 1968. Novel.
- 'The Muriel Mine and those who built it', Rhodesiana, No. 21 (December 1969), pp.55-60
- A Ring Has No End. Salisbury: Gazebo Books, 1977. Poetry.
- Python Cave. Gwelo: Modern Press, 1977. Children's story. (First serialised without the author's permission in The Children's Newspaper, 1973.)
- The Country of the Mind. Salisbury: Kailani Books, 1981. Poetry.
- (ed.) The Wilder Shores of Love. Harare: Gemini, 1984. Poetry anthology.
