= Nyamandhlovu =

Rural district in Matabeleland North Province of Zimbabwe

Coordinates: 19°52′S 28°16′E

Nyamandlovu also known as Nyamayendlovu is a rural district located roughly 40 km northwest of Bulawayo and in Matabeleland North Province of Zimbabwe. Nyamayendlovu loosely translated means "elephant meat" in the local language, isiNdebele.

The community is predominantly Ndebele. It is dependent on rural farming and cattle rearing because the soil is rich and there is abundant underground water. The land has been redistributed by the government to residents.
