= Togara Muzanenhamo =

Zimbabwean poet (born 1975)

- Born: 1975 (age 49–50); Lusaka, Zambia
- Education: St George's College, Harare
- Occupation: Poet
- Notable work: Virga
- Awards: Glenna Luschei Prize for African Poetry

Togara Muzanenhamo (born 1975) is a Zimbabwean poet born in Lusaka, Zambia, to Zimbabwean parents. He was brought up in Zimbabwe on his family's farm – 50 km (30 mi) west of the capital Harare. He attended St George's College, Harare. He studied Business Administration in France and the Netherlands. After his studies, he returned to Zimbabwe and worked as a journalist, then moved to an institute dedicated to the development of African screenplays.

Muzanenhamo's first collection of poems, Spirit Brides, was published by Carcanet Press in 2006, and was shortlisted for the Jerwood Aldeburgh First Collection Prize in 2006.

Muzanenhamo won the African Poetry Book Fund's 2022 Glenna Luschei Prize for African Poetry for Virga, his fourth collection of poetry, which was also a Brittle Paper notable book of the year, an Irish Times Best Poetry Book of the Year, and a Poetry Society Autumn Recommendation. As noted by Brittle Paper: "Virga is a collection of poetry that covers a variety of historical events, all over the world, connected by the weather. Ultimately, these poems connect to themes about global change, history, and human connection." A review by Isabelle Baafi described it as "a collection that grapples with humanity's progress thus far, and the progress still to come in our ever-changing world."

== Works ==
- Spirit Brides, Carcanet Press, Manchester, 2006
- Gumiguru, Carcanet Press, Manchester, 2014
- Textures (with John Eppel), amaBooks, Bulawayo, 2014
- Virga, Carcanet Press, 2021
