= Zimbabwe Women Writers =

Zimbabwe Women Writers (ZWW) is an organization for women writers established in 1990 in Zimbabwe. It was "the first women's organization in Zimbabwe and in Southern Africa to address gender imbalance through writing and publishing".

Established in response to a need expressed at a 1990 writers' workshop, ZWW had over ninety branches across Zimbabwe by the turn of the century. In its first decade, it published over two hundred books by women, in English, Shona and Ndebele. In 1990 a few women writers formed Zimbabwe Women Writers (ZWW) to promote women's writings in the country. It now has 600 members and 56 branches in both the rural and urban areas throughout the country.

Background In 1990, there was a desire for a group to encourage and support women writers. That’s where ZWW emerged from. It expanded rapidly, opening 56 branches with 600 members throughout Zimbabwe. The ZWW releases anthologies of women's writing in languages such as English, Ndebele, and Shona. ZWW concentrated on providing women writers who had limited access to educational and publishing opportunities some resources and training. The organization's goal was to challenge the patriarchal norms in society that silenced women's stories and raise awareness of the value of women's voices in literature.

Significance Zimbabwe Women Writers (ZWW) is significant for its role in empowering and advocating for women writers amidst gender inequality and restricted access to educational opportunities for women. It has given Zimbabwean women the platform to express their viewpoints and experiences, giving voice to topics that are marginalized in mainstream Zimbabwean literature. ZWW has greatly advanced Zimbabwean literature and expanded its audience of women’s writing by publishing anthologies in multiple languages. Overall, ZWW has helped build a generation of women writers under the organization's emphasis on mentorship and skill development, which has helped them hone their craft and succeed in the publishing industry. ZWW’s aim to challenge gender roles and promotion of inclusivity in literature has made positive social and cultural changes in Zimbabwean society.

== Publications ==
- Kitson, Norma, Anthology of Zimbabwe Women Writers. Zimbabwe: ZWW, 1994. With a foreword by David Karimanzira.
- Selections: English Poetry and Short Stories. Harare: ZWW, 1997, repr. 2001.
- Inkondlo [Selections]. Harare: ZWW, 1998. (A Ndebele anthology.)
- Nhetembo [Selections]. Harare: ZWW, 1990. (A Shona anthology.)
- Women of Resilience: The voices of women ex-combatants. Harare: Zimbabwe Women Writers, 2000.
- A Tragedy of Lives. Harare: Zimbabwe Women Writers, 2003.
