= John Eppel =

Zimbabwean writer (born 1947)

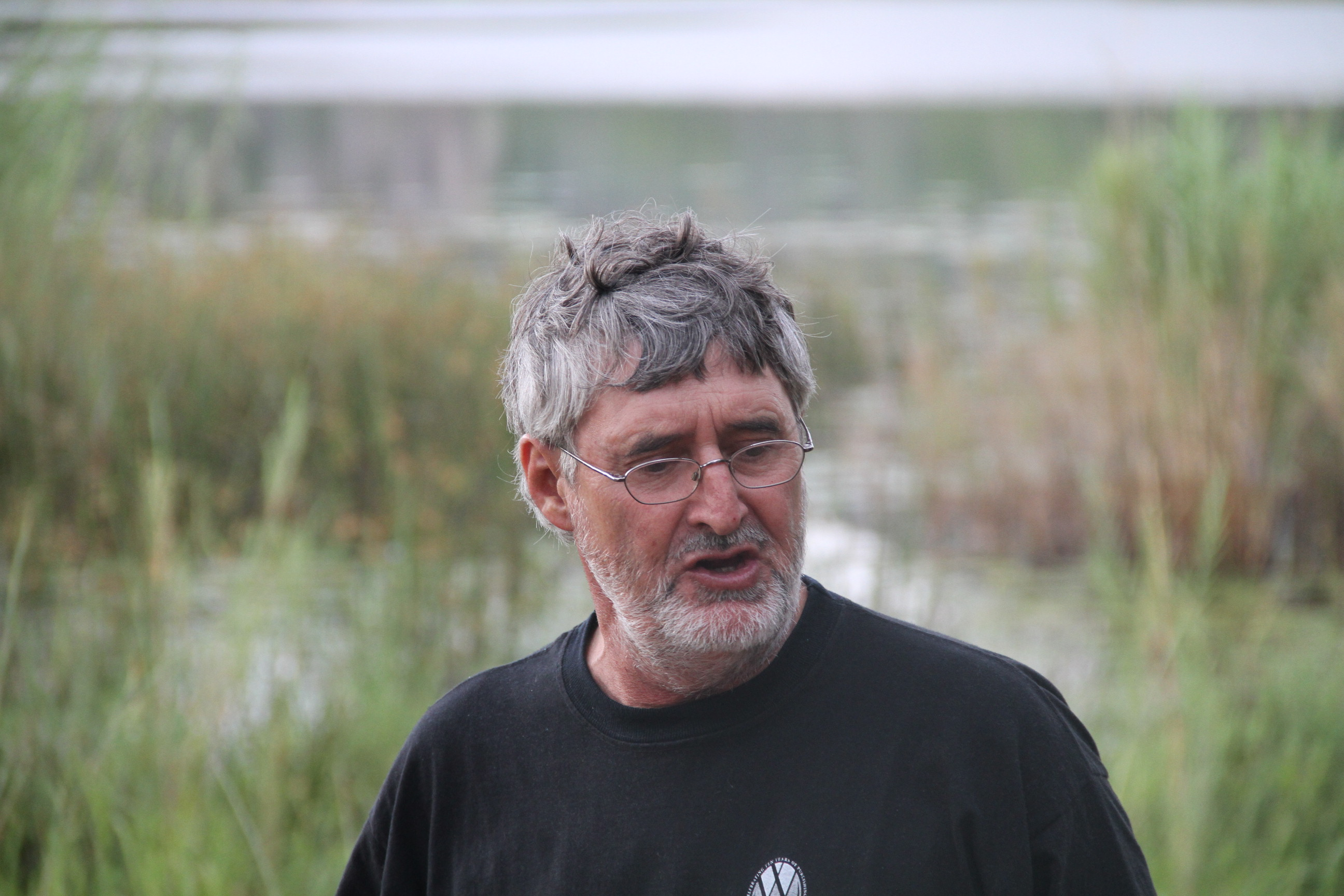
- Eppel in 2012
- Born: 19 September 1947 (age 78); Lydenburg, South Africa
- Education: Milton High School; University of Natal
- Occupations: Novelist, poet, short story writer, teacher
- Writing career
- Period: 1965–present
- Genres: Literary fiction, Satire, Humor
- Notable work: D G G Berry's The Great North Road
- Notable awards: Ingrid Jonker Prize
- Movement: Post-colonialism

John Eppel (born 19 September 1947) is a Zimbabwean short story writer, novelist and poet. In 1990 he was awarded the Ingrid Jonker Prize for his poetry volume, "Spoils of War", detailing his experiences as a soldier in the Rhodesian Bush War.

== Early life ==
John Eppel born in Lydenburg, South Africa. He moved to Colleen Bawn, a small mining town in the south of Southern Rhodesia (now Zimbabwe), at the age of four. He was educated at Milton High School in Bulawayo, and later attended the University of Natal in South Africa, where he completed his English master's degree in "A Study of Keatsian Dialectics".

== Career ==
Eppel has published more than 20 books, one of which, The Giraffe Man, has been translated into French. He has crafted a creative writing course for the University of South Africa and published three O-Level and one A-Level literature study guides. He was awarded the Ingrid Jonker Prize for his first poetry volume, Spoils of War, and the MNet Prize in 1993 for his novel D G G Berry's the Great North Road. Eppel's second novel, Hatchings, was nominated for the MNet Prize in 1993/4.

His works are studied in universities across South Africa. He teaches English at Christian Brothers College, Bulawayo.

=== List of published books ===
- Making Whoopie (Online)
- Not the Whispering Wild (Pigeon Press)
- The Boy who loved Camping (Pigeon Press)
- Poems of Resistance (Mwanaka Publishing)
- Traffickings (InkSword)
- O Suburbia (Weaver Press)
- White Man Walking (Mwanaka Publishing)
- Landlocked (Smith/Doorstep)
- Textures (with Togara Muzanenhamo), 'amaBooks
- Hewn From Rock (with Philani Nyoni)
- Together (with Julius Chingono), 'amaBooks/UNO Press/UKZN Press
- Absent: The English Teacher, Jacana
- White Man Crawling (2007), 'amaBooks
- Hatchings (reprint), Republished by 'amaBooks
- Songs My Country Taught Me, Weaver Press
- The Caruso of Collen Bawn and other short writings, 'amaBooks
- The Holy Innocents, 'amaBooks
- The Curse of the Ripe Tomato, 'amaBooks
- Selected poems 1965-1995, Childline
- Sonata for Matabeleland, Snailpress/Baobab Books
- The Giraffe Man, Quelliere
- Hatchings, Carrefour
- D G G Berry's The Great North Road, Carrefour/Hippogriff (1992) (Recently re-published in E-Book format on Amazon)
- Spoils of War (1989), Carrefour
- Four Voices (with N. H. Brettell, Rowland Molony, and David Wright), Books of Zimbabwe

== Personal life ==
Eppel married at the age of 34 and has three children: Ben, Ruth and Joe. His ex-wife, Shari, is a poet and prominent human rights activist.
