= Confederation of Zimbabwe Industries =

Organisation for industry in Zimbabwe

Confederation of Zimbabwe Industries (CZI) is the primary organisation for industry in Zimbabwe, founded in 1923. CZI has four regional chamber offices in Mashonaland, Matebeleland, Midlands, and Manicaland and the head office is in Harare. It is an independent, self-financed, legally constituted organisation.
