= Olivia Sibanda =

Zimbabwean novelist (born 1979)

Olivia Mahwaya Sibanda (born 1979) is a Zimbabwean novelist writing in Ndebele. In 2020 a manuscript of her third novel, at that point entitled Futhi Ya, won the inaugural Ndebele writing award from the Barbara Clara Makhalisa Nkala Literary Trust. She won $250 and help with the publication of her novel.

== Life ==
Born in Filabusi, Olivia Sibanda was educated at Tshazi Secondary School. After pursuing another career, she started trying to write in 2012. Her first novel Ukuzala was published in 2017.

Work by Sibande has been set for A-Level examination in Ndebele.

== Works ==
- Ukuzala. 2017.
- Ubuzwe Abuthengwa.
- Umkhosi Wenhliziyo. Harare: Radiant Publishing, 2020. ISBN 978-1-77925-359-0
