= 1990s in Zimbabwe =

- Other decades
- 1970s | 1980s | 1990s | 2000s | 2010s

General elections were held in March 1990. In July the government lifted the 25-year-old state of emergency. Zimbabwe became a republic on 17 April 1991. In November 1992 the first cases of a cholera epidemic were reported from within the Tongogara Refugee Camp in Manicaland. In March 1993, the Zimbabwe national rugby union team scored an upset win over the France national rugby union team, with Zimbabwe winning 28-3. The event was widely celebrated in Zimbabwe, but was also controversial because all but one member of Zimbabwe's team were White. In June 1993 the government announced plans to downsize the 50,000-strong Zimbabwe National Army by 10,000 men over the next five years. The combined Zimbabwe Defense Forces Headquarters was formed in July 1994. In April 1995 parliamentary elections were held. The Zimbabwe African National Union-Patriotic Front (ZANU-PF) ran unopposed in 54 of the 120 electoral districts and a further 20 parliamentary seats were reserved. Zimbabwe sent delegates to Ottawa, Ontario, Canada to discuss land mines and launch the Ottawa Treaty in October 1996. The government unilaterally banned anti-personnel mines on 15 May 1997, signing Mine Ban Treaty on 3 December. The government ratified the treaty on 18 June 1998. A court sentenced Canaan Banana, Methodist minister, theologian, and the former President of Zimbabwe to ten years imprisonment, nine years suspended for sodomy, on 18 January 1999. Major mine clearance operations started in three of Zimbabwe's seven, identified, contaminated areas in March.

The Movement for Democratic Change was formed in September.

== Cricket ==
The Zimbabwean cricket team beat the Kenyan cricket team by 5 wickets at Taunton during the Cricket World Cup on 15 May, beating India by three runs at Leicester on 19 May, losing to Sri Lanka by four wickets at Worcester on 22 May, losing to the UK on 25 May by seven wickets at Nottingham, and defeating South Africa on 29 May by 42 runs at Chelmsford. The cricket team had a draw with New Zealand on 6 June at Leeds, losing to Australia on 9 June by 44 runs at Lord's and losing again to Pakistan on 11 June at The Oval.

== Gymnastics ==
At the 1995 All-Africa Games, Karen Angus won the gold medal on the women's floor exercise, becoming Zimbabwe's first ever gymnastics champion at the All-Africa Games.

== See also ==
- List of years in Zimbabwe
