= Shimmer Chinodya =

Zimbabwean novelist

Shimmer Chinodya (born 1957 Gwelo, then Federation of Rhodesia and Nyasaland) is a Zimbabwean novelist.

Chinodya studied at Mambo Primary School. He was expelled from Goromonzi after demonstrating against Ian Smith's government. He graduated from the University of Zimbabwe and University of Iowa as a Master of Arts in creative writing in 1985.

Chinodya won the 1990 Commonwealth Writers' Prize for the Africa region and Strife won Outstanding Fiction Book at the 2007 National Arts Merit Awards.

== Works ==
- Dew in the Morning. Mambo Press. 1982. ISBN 9780435912062.; Heinemann, 2001, ISBN 978-0-435-91206-2
- Farai’s Girls (1984)
- Child of War (1986)
- Harvest of Thorns (1989)
- Can we talk and other Stories (1998)
- Tale of Tamari (2004)
- Chairman of Fools (2005)
- Strife. African Books Collective. 2006. ISBN 978-1-77922-058-5.
- Tindo's Quest, Longman Zimbabwe (Pvt) (January 2011), ISBN 978-1779034922
