= 2000s in Zimbabwe =

- Other decades
- 1980s | 1990s | 2000s | 2010s | 2020s

Zimbabwe began experiencing a period of considerable political and economic upheaval in 1999. Opposition to President Mugabe and the ZANU-PF government grew considerably after the mid-1990s in part due to worsening economic and human rights conditions. The Movement for Democratic Change (MDC) was established in September 1999 as an opposition party founded by trade unionist Morgan Tsvangirai.

The MDC's first opportunity to test opposition to the Mugabe government came in February 2000, when a referendum was held on a draft constitution proposed by the government. Among its elements, the new constitution would have permitted President Mugabe to seek two additional terms in office, granted government officials immunity from prosecution, and authorised government seizure of white-owned land. The referendum was handily defeated. Shortly thereafter, the government, through a loosely organised group of war veterans, sanctioned an aggressive land redistribution program often characterised by forced expulsion of white farmers and violence against both farmers and farm employees.

Parliamentary elections held in June 2000 were marred by localised violence, and claims of electoral irregularities and government intimidation of opposition supporters. Nonetheless, the MDC succeeded in capturing 57 of 120 seats in the National Assembly.

== 2002 ==
The Youth brigade assaulted residents of Ruwa and Mabvuku on 2 January 2002 sealing off the towns of Bindura, Chinhoyi and Karoi on 8 January as part of a recruiting drive and to weed out members of the Movement for Democratic Change before the upcoming elections. Militants petrol bombed the offices of The Daily News, Zimbabwe's main independent daily newspaper, on 11 February. Kenneth Walker reported on National Public Radio on 15 February that the Zimbabwean government had sent troops into Matabeleland. The legislature passed a law in May, giving 2,900 farmers 45 days to wind up operations and another 45 days to leave their land and make way for black settlers. In July the High Court under Judge Feargus Blackie sentenced Patrick Chinamasa, the Justice Minister, to three months in jail on contempt of court charges after the minister repeatedly ignored a court summons. Chinamasa ignored the ruling and police refused to arrest him. The High Court ruled against the state on 8 August in the confiscation of Andrew Kockett's farm because it had not informed the National Merchant Bank, the mortgage holder. Some farmers vacated their land in connection with the expropriation law originally passed in May, but police arrested more than 300 white farmers who refused to vacate their land on 16 August. A bomb exploded at the Voice of the People, an independent radio station in Harare, on 29 August. Police arrested twelve sugar cane farmers from the Chiredzi area in September for refusing to leave their farms. Police arrest Feargus Blackie, a former High Court Judge, is arrested on 13 September. Police find Learnmore Jongwe, a Movement for Democratic Change MP, dead in his prison cell on 22 October. Police had originally arrested Jongwe for allegedly murdering his wife.

Presidential elections were held in March 2002. In the months leading up to the poll, ZANU-PF, with the support of the army, security services and especially the so-called 'war veterans' – very few of whom actually fought in the Second Chimurenga against the Smith regime in the 1970s – set about wholesale intimidation and suppression of the MDC-led opposition. Despite strong international criticism, these measures, together with organised subversion of the electoral process, ensured a Mugabe victory. The government's behaviour drew strong criticism from the EU and the US, which imposed limited sanctions against the leading members of the Mugabe regime. Since the 2002 election, Zimbabwe has suffered further economic difficulty and growing political chaos. Opposition activists were "hunted down, beaten, tortured and in some cases murdered."

== 2003 ==
As a direct result of the farm seizures in the previous few years, Zimbabwe entered into an unprecedented food crisis. Most of the countries food was produced by roughly one thousand large commercial farms owned by White Zimbabweans. When those farms were violently occupied by the Zimbabwean government, they were then redistributed to black Zimbabweans. However, in most cases they were given to members of the ruling party who had political connections, and in almost no cases were they given to anyone who had experience farming. As a result, the "landless peasants" who Mugabe has promised land mostly remained landless, however as of 2003 the country was plunged into an emergency in which there was not enough food to feed the population or even stock most grocery stores. By 2003, Zimbabwe's economy was the fastest shrinking economy in Africa. From 1984 to 1999, the United Nations' World Food Programme relied on Zimbabwean agriculture to produce food used for food aid throughout the rest of Africa, however, by 2003 the situation had reversed, and the WFP had to hire hundreds of international and Zimbabwean aid workers to distribute food throughout Zimbabwe for the first time ever. Western governments, including the United States and the United Kingdom, gave the organization $300 million to feed some 5.5 million Zimbabweans, nearly 50 percent of the country's population. In February, and then once more in December, opinion polls showed that the United Kingdom remained the "most positively viewed foreign country" in Zimbabwe, despite President Mugabe's very public feud with the British government. The 2003 Cricket World Cup, partially hosted by Zimbabwe, was marred by threats of violence and instability for the first time in the history of the institution, as Mugabe's government threatened players of the England cricket team with physical violence, leading several nations to refuse to play in Zimbabwe. The 2003 Cricket World Cup Final was the second most-watched television event of the year in Zimbabwe The 2003 Rugby World Cup Final was the most-watched television event in Zimbabwe in 2003. Global audience figures for the 2003 Rugby World Cup final totalled between 22 and 30 million. The treason trial of Morgan Tsvangirai began in the High Court in Harare on 3 February. President Robert Mugabe issued a decree on 7 December, announcing that Zimbabwe was permanently withdrawing from the Commonwealth to protest the organisation's criticism of ZANU-PF and the government's policies. Canaan Banana, Methodist minister, theologian and the first President of Zimbabwe, died of cancer on 10 November in London at the age of 67. 3,800 deaths from AIDS occurred in Zimbabwe each week of 2003.

== 2004–2005 ==
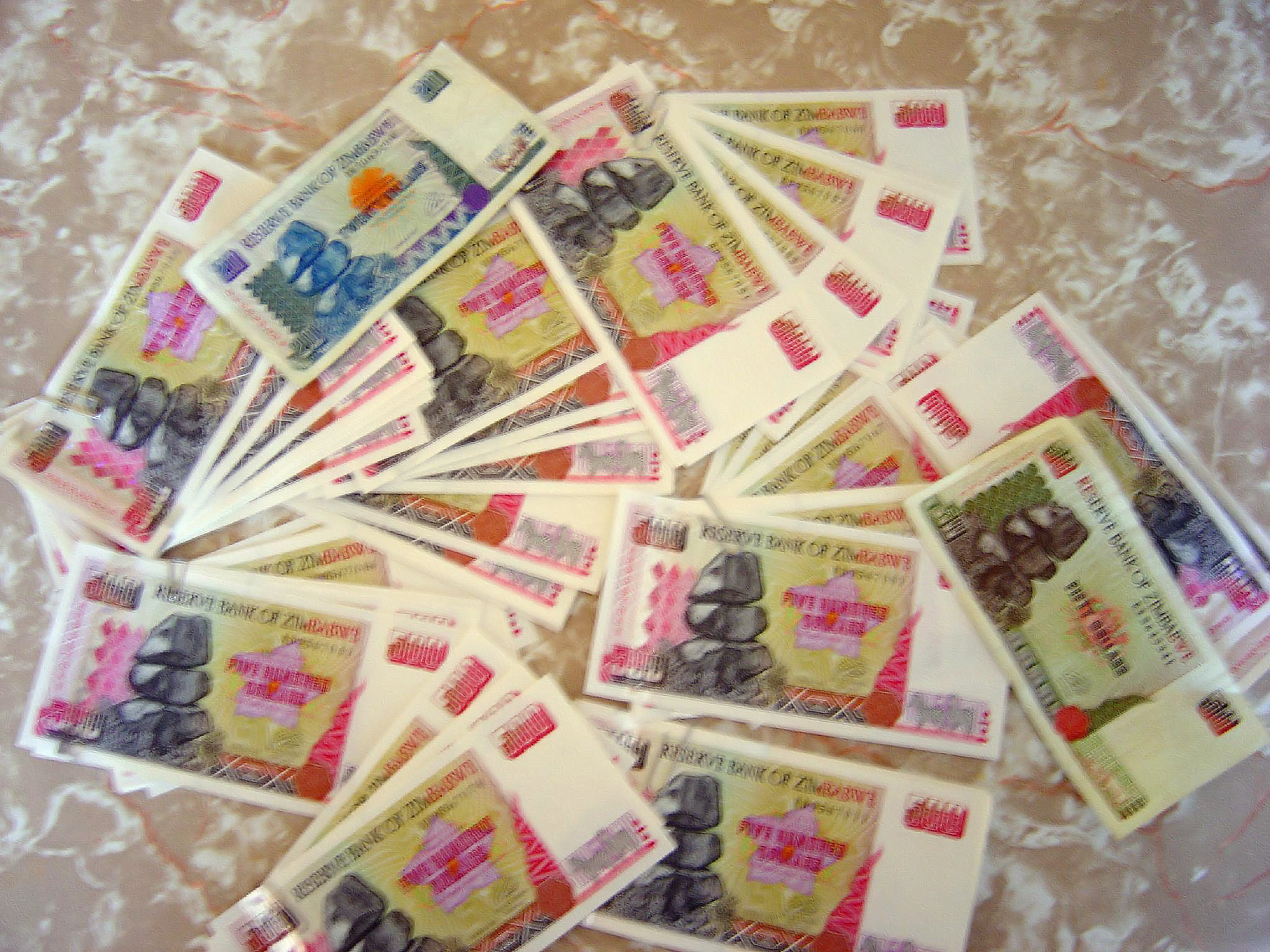
£8 worth of Zimbabwean dollars in 2003

Divisions within the opposition MDC had begun to fester early in the decade, after Morgan Tsvangirai (the president of the MDC) was lured into a government sting operation that videotaped him talking of Mr. Mugabe's removal from power. He was subsequently arrested and put on trial on treason charges. This crippled his control of party affairs and raised questions about his competence. It also catalysed a major split within the party. In 2004 he was acquitted, but not after suffering serious abuse and mistreatment in prison. The opposing faction was led by Welshman Ncube who was the general secretary of the party. In mid-2004, vigilantes loyal to Mr. Tsvangirai began attacking members who were mostly loyal to Ncube, climaxing in a September raid on the party's Harare headquarters in which the security director was nearly thrown to his death.

The Committee to Protect Journalists released a list of the ten most hazardous countries for journalists on 2 May 2004 placing Zimbabwe third after Iraq and Cuba as the most dangerous place to be a journalist.

An internal party inquiry later established that aides to Tsvangirai had tolerated, if not endorsed, the violence. Divisive as the violence was, it was a debate over the rule of law that set off the party's final break-up in November 2005. These division severely weakened the opposition. In addition the government employed its own operatives to both spy on each side and to undermine each side via acts of espionage. Zimbabwean parliamentary election, 2005 were held in March 2005 in which ZANU-PF won a two-thirds majority, were again criticised by international observers as being flawed. Mugabe's political operatives were thus able to weaken the opposition internally and the security apparatus of the state was able to destabilise it externally by using violence in anti-Mugabe strongholds to prevent citizens from voting. Some voters were 'turned away' from polling station despite having proper identification, further guaranteeing that the government could control the results. Additionally Mugabe had started to appoint with judges sympathetic to the government, making any judicial appeal futile. Mugabe was also able to appoint 30 of the Members of Parliament.

As Senate elections approached further opposition splits occurred. Ncube's supporters argued that the M.D.C. should field a slate of candidates; Tsvangirai's argued for a boycott. When party leaders voted on the issue, Ncube's side narrowly won, but Mr. Tsvangirai declared that as president of the party he was not bound by the majority's decision. Again the opposition was weakened. As a result, the elections for a new Senate in November 2005 were largely boycotted by the opposition. Mugabe's party won 24 of the 31 constituencies where elections were held amid low voter turnout. Again, evidence surfaced of voter intimidation and fraud.

In May 2005 the government began Operation Murambatsvina. It was officially billed to rid urban areas of illegal structures, illegal business enterprises, and criminal activities. In practice its purpose was to punish political opponents. The UN estimates 700,000 people have been left without jobs or homes as a result. Families and traders, especially at the beginning of the operation, were often given no notice before police destroyed their homes and businesses. Others were able to salvage some possessions and building materials but often had nowhere to go, despite the government's statement that people should be returning to their rural homes. Thousands of families were left unprotected in the open in the middle of Zimbabwe's winter. The government interfered with non-governmental organisation (NGO) efforts to provide emergency assistance to the displaced in many instances. Some families were removed to transit camps, where they had no shelter or cooking facilities and minimal food, supplies, and sanitary facilities. The operation continued into July 2005, when the government began a program to provide housing for the newly displaced.

Human Rights Watch said the evictions had disrupted treatment for people with HIV/Aids in a country where 3,000 die from the disease each week and about 1.3 million children have been orphaned. The operation was "the latest manifestation of a massive human rights problem that has been going on for years", said Amnesty International. As of September 2006, housing construction fell far short of demand, and there were reports that beneficiaries were mostly civil servants and ruling party loyalists, not those displaced. The government campaign of forced evictions continued in 2006, albeit on a lesser scale.

In September 2005 Mugabe signed constitutional amendments that reinstituted a national senate (abolished in 1987) and that nationalised all land. This converted all ownership rights into leases. The amendments also ended the right of landowners to challenge government expropriation of land in the courts and marked the end of any hope of returning any land that had been hitherto grabbed by armed land invasions. Elections for the senate in November resulted in a victory for the government. The MDC split over whether to field candidates and partially boycotted the vote. In addition to low turnout there was widespread government intimidation. The split in the MDC hardened into factions, each of which claimed control of the party. The early months of 2006 were marked by food shortages and mass hunger. The sheer extremity of the siltation was revealed by the fact that in the courts, state witnesses said they were too weak from hunger to testify.

== 2006 ==
The Reserve Bank of Zimbabwe's governor Gideon Gono issued his fourth quarter monetary policy review statement on 24 January 2006. Joseph Mutima allegedly tried to assassinate Vice President Joyce Majuru that same month. Morgan Tsvangirai's three-day visit to Zambia came to an abrupt end on 2 February when the government deported Tsvangirai and eight senior Movement for Democratic Change officials from Livingstone, Zambia. The Zimbabwean government arrested 420 women, 19 babies and 7 men on 14 February during two Women of Zimbabwe Arise protest marches held in Bulawayo and Harare. The Reserve Bank of Zimbabwe announced that it had cleared its US$9 million arrears to the International Monetary Fund on 15 February. Arthur Mutambara addressed a Pro-Senate Movement for Democratic Change faction rally in Bulawayo on 18 March. The Movement for Democratic Change's Congress took place in Harare from 18 to 19 March. Party members reelected Tsvangirai. Air Zimbabwe started charging fares in U.S. dollars on 20 March.

In August 2006 run away inflation forced the government to replace its existing currency with a revalued one. In December 2006, ZANU-PF proposed the "harmonisation" of the parliamentary and presidential election schedules in 2010; the move was seen by the opposition as an excuse to extend Mugabe's term as president until 2010.

== 2007 ==
Police arrested Morgan Tsvangirai, politician and leader of the Movement for Democratic Change, on 11 March 2007, seriously beating him in a prison in Harare. Tsvangirai sustained a skull fracture, broken wrist, and bruises. Over 200 people are injured by people as the MDC negotiates with the government over Tsvangirai. Two female officers were seriously injured in a fire-bombed attack on a police station in Harare on 14 March. President Mugabe commented on the incident the next day, saying, "When they criticise the government when it tries to prevent violence and punish perpetrators of that violence we take the position that they can go hang." The Australian government floated the idea of evacuating its citizens from Zimbabwe on 16 March. Four ranking members of the MDC were refused permission to leave the country on 17 March with one beaten, suffering a fractured skull. The hospital where Tsvangirai was housed released him on 19 March. Many protestors are injured in scuffles with police the next day. Zambian President Levy Mwanawasa compared the situation in Zimbabwe to a "sinking titanic" on 21 March. The Roman Catholic Archbishop of Bulawayo, Pius Ncube, called for mass public protests to pressure President Mugabe to resign on 22 March and the day after John Howard, the Prime Minister of Australia, called for the world to oust Mugabe. Representatives for the MDC and ZANU-PF met in South Africa in September and agreed to constitutional changes that would allow presidential and parliamentary elections to be held simultaneously in 2008. Ian Smith, the Prime Minister of Rhodesia, died on 20 November at the age of 88.

Morgan Tsvangirai was badly beaten on 12 March 2007 after being arrested and held at Machipisa Police Station in the Highfield suburb of Harare. The event garnered an international outcry and was considered particularly brutal and extreme, even for a regime as nefarious as Mugabe's. "We are very concerned by reports of continuing brutal attacks on opposition activists in Zimbabwe and call on the government to stop all acts of violence and intimidation against opposition activists," said Kolawole Olaniyan, Director of Amnesty International's Africa Programme.

The economy shrank by 50% from 2000 to 2007. In September 2007 the inflation rate was put at almost 8,000%, the world's highest. There are frequent power and water outages. Harare's drinking water became unreliable in 2006 and as a consequence dysentery and cholera swept the city in December 2006 and January 2007. Unemployment in formal jobs is running at a record 80%. There is widespread famine, which has been cynically manipulated by the government so that opposition strongholds suffer the most. Most recently, supplies of bread have dried up, after a poor wheat harvest, and the closure of all bakeries.

The country used to be one of Africa's richest and is now one of its poorest. Many observers now view the country as a 'failed state'. The settlement of the Second Congo War brought back Zimbabwe's substantial military commitment, although some troops remain to secure the mining assets under their control. The government lacks the resources or machinery to deal with the ravages of the HIV/AIDS pandemic, which affects 25% of the population. With all this and the forced and violent removal of white farmers in a brutal land redistribution program, Mugabe has earned himself widespread scorn from the international arena.

The regime has managed to cling to power by creating wealthy enclaves for government ministers, and senior party members. For example, Borrowdale Brook, a suburb of Harare is an oasis of wealth and privilege. It features mansions, manicured lawns, full shops with fully stocked shelves containing an abundance of fruit and vegetables, big cars and a golf club give is the home to President Mugabe's out-of-town retreat.

Zimbabwe's bakeries shut down in October 2007 and supermarkets warned that they would have no bread for the foreseeable future due to collapse in wheat production after the seizure of white-owned farms. The ministry of agriculture has also blamed power shortages for the wheat shortfall, saying that electricity cuts have affected irrigation and halved crop yields per acre. The power shortages are because Zimbabwe relies on Mozambique for some of its electricity and that due to an unpaid bill of $35 million Mozambique had reduced the amount of electrical power it supplies. On 4 December 2007, The United States imposed travel sanctions against 38 people with ties to President Mugabe because they "played a central role in the regime's escalated human rights abuses."

On 8 December 2007, Mugabe attended a meeting of EU and African leaders in Lisbon, prompting UK Prime Minister Gordon Brown to decline to attend. While German PM Angela Merkel criticised Mugabe with her public comments, the leaders of other African countries offered him statements of support.

== 2008 ==
General elections for Zimbabwe were held on March 29, 2008 to elect the president and Parliamentary members. Leading up to the election, the country faced high inflation at 165,000% over-year on February 2008. Zimbabwe's economic situation reflected in citizens facing increased levels of poverty. Given the economic situation, the support for incumbent president Robert Mugabe - who had served initially as Prime Minister and later Executive President since 1980 - began to decline.

Morgan Tsvangirai, who leads the larger faction of the Movement for Democratic Change (MDC) is again a contestant. Tsvangirai, a former trade unionist and his party came close to toppling Mugabe in parliamentary elections in 2000 and in a presidential vote in 2002, but his leadership has been questioned since a serious within the MDC over strategy in the November 2005 senate elections. Simba Makoni, the other challenger was formerly a member of Mugabe's own party, Zanu-PF. Makoni, who served 10 years in Mugabe's government including a stint as finance minister, announced his defection from the party on 5 February to enable him to stand as an independent against his former boss and mentor. It is the first time that Mugabe has faced a challenge from within his own ranks.

One of the few polls Zimbabwean academics attempted to carry out showed Tsvangirai leading, with Mugabe second and Makoni third. But with more than 20% of people questioned refusing to answer, this can only be seen as a very rough guide.

The MDC has accused the government of printing millions of surplus ballot papers, raising the risk of vote-rigging. The MDC said leaked documents showed 9m ballot papers had been ordered for the 5.9 million people registered to vote. Opposition supporters have been beaten by Mugabe's thugs and in last-minute changes to voting procedures, police will be allowed a supervisory role inside polling stations rather than outside, a presence the opposition says is designed to intimidate voters.

Under Zimbabwean law, when several candidates contest the presidency the winning candidate must receive at least 51% of the vote, otherwise a second round between the two leading candidates must be held within 21 days.

If the results are disputed, the fear is of violence in Zimbabwe's more volatile areas in what could be a repeat of the violent aftermath of the Kenyan elections December. If the election leads to further confrontation, analysts say the African Union (AU) should be ready to quickly offer mediation for a power-sharing agreement and a transitional government.

Andebrhan Giorgis, of the International Crisis Group thinktank, has warned: "If the region's leaders were again to recognise an illegitimate government, Zimbabwe's dramatic economic disintegration would continue, and the inevitable next round of the struggle over Mugabe's succession could easily provoke bloodshed."

== 2009 ==
- 2 February – The Zimbabwean government announced that one trillion Zimbabwean dollars was revalued as one new Zimbabwean dollar.
- 11 February – Morgan Tsvangirai was sworn in as the new Prime Minister of Zimbabwe following the power-sharing deal between him and President Robert Mugabe signed in September 2008.
- 6 March – Morgan Tsvangirai's wife was killed in a car accident in which he was also injured. According to news reports, Mr Tsvangirai was taken to hospital with head and neck injuries.

== Deterioration of the educational system ==
The educational system in Zimbabwe which was once regarded as among the best in Africa, had gone into crisis because of the country's economic meltdown. Almost a quarter of the teachers had quit the country, absenteeism was high, buildings were crumbling and standards plummeting. One foreign reporter witnessed hundreds of children at Hatcliffe Extension Primary School in Epworth, 12 miles (19 km) west of Harare, writing in the dust on the floor because they had no exercise books or pencils. The high school exam system unravelled in 2007. Examiners refused to mark examination papers when they were offered just Z$79 a paper, enough to buy three small candies. Corruption had crept into the system and explained why in January 2007 thousands of pupils received no marks for subjects they had entered, while others were deemed "excellent" in subjects they had not sat for. Various disused offices and storerooms had been turned into makeshift brothels at the University of Zimbabwe in Harare by students and staff who had turned to prostitution to make ends meet. Students were destitute following the institution's refusal in July to re-open their halls of residence, effectively banning students from staying on campus. Student leaders believed this was part of the administration's plan to take revenge on them for their demonstrations over deteriorating standards.
