= Macheke =

Human settlement in Mashonaland East, Zimbabwe

Coordinates: 18°09′S 31°51′E

Macheke is a small Zimbabwean town located in Murehwa District in the province of Mashonaland East, located about 105 km south-east of Harare on the main A3 Harare-Mutare highway road. According to the 1982 population census, the town had a population of 1,888. It was named after the Macheke River and means "you have divided".

== Geography ==
The city has old locations called Nyazema (high density suburbs), which were the first locations to be settled by the Macheke Founders. Now the town has grown into Springfield and Damview (low density suburbs), and Mutamba phase 1 & phase 2 (high density suburbs).

== Demographics ==
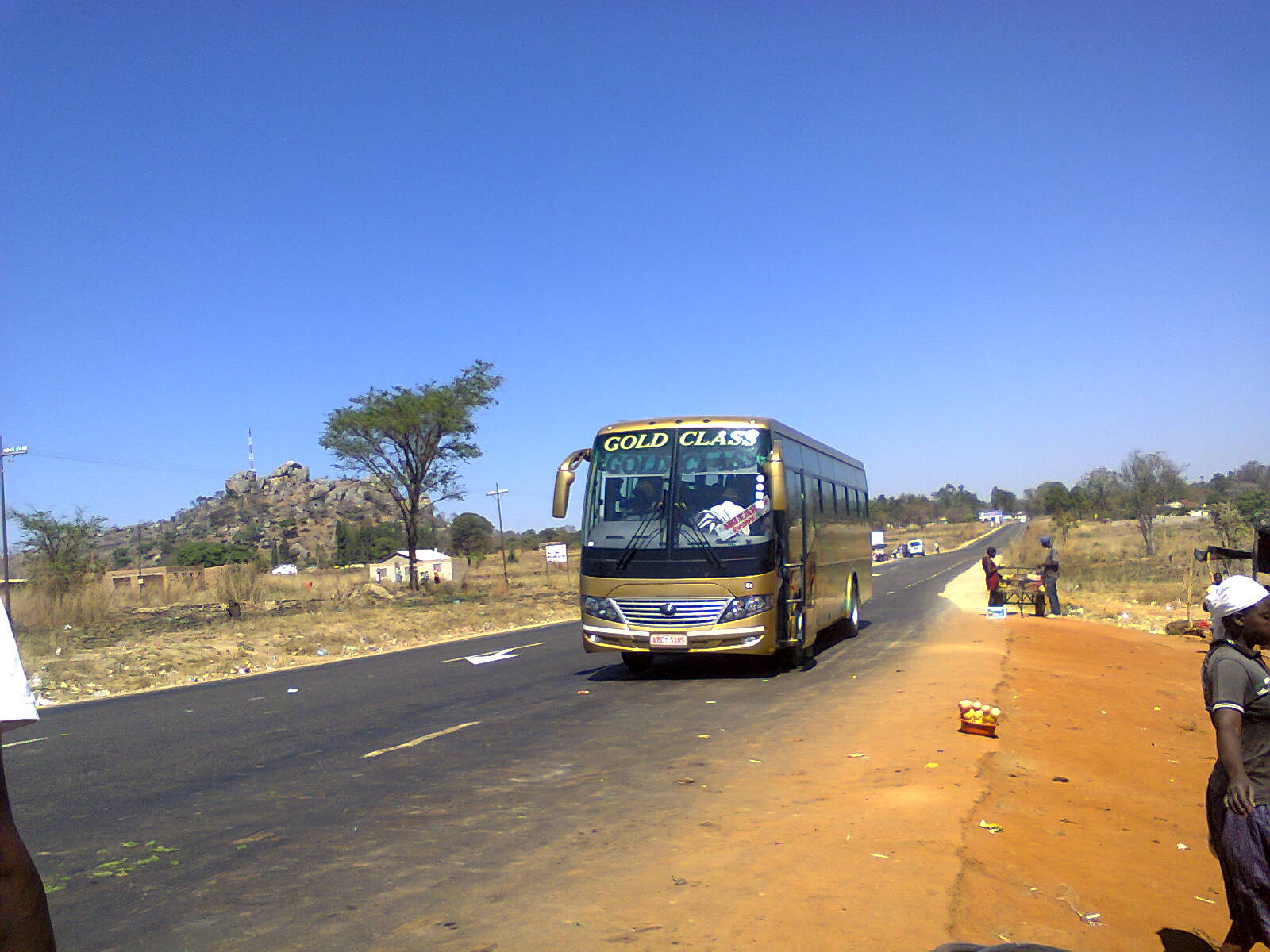
Bus going from Harare to Mutare at Macheke bus stop

Macheke residents are mostly from Malawi and other parts of Zimbabwe. The town founders are from Malawi and neighboring areas. English, Chishona, and Chichewa are the major languages spoken in Macheke.

== Economy ==
Tobacco and mixed crops are farmed in the surrounding lands. There are a number of large scale tobacco and horticultural farmers in the area so Macheke serves as the main business centre providing goods and services for the farming community. Regarding business expansion, Macheke has burgeoned.

Vending along the highway is one of the major economic activities done in this area. Hawkers mainly sell fresh farm produce that is sourced and procured from the surrounding farms. Main products sold include tomatoes, potatoes and various other vegetables.

There are also a handful of horticultural exporters in the area. Crops grown for export mainly include soft fruit, mange tout peas and fine beans.

== Personalities ==
Macheke is the hometown of Wicknell Chivayo, a well known and controversial Zimbabwean businessman accused of government contract abuse during the rule of Robert Mugabe. Macheke is also the hometown of Vernon Kuzhaka, a publicly proclaimed ally of the Zanu PF lacoste faction who was pivotal to anti G40 politics during the Mugabe era.
