= Yvonne Vera =

Zimbabwean writer (1964–2005)

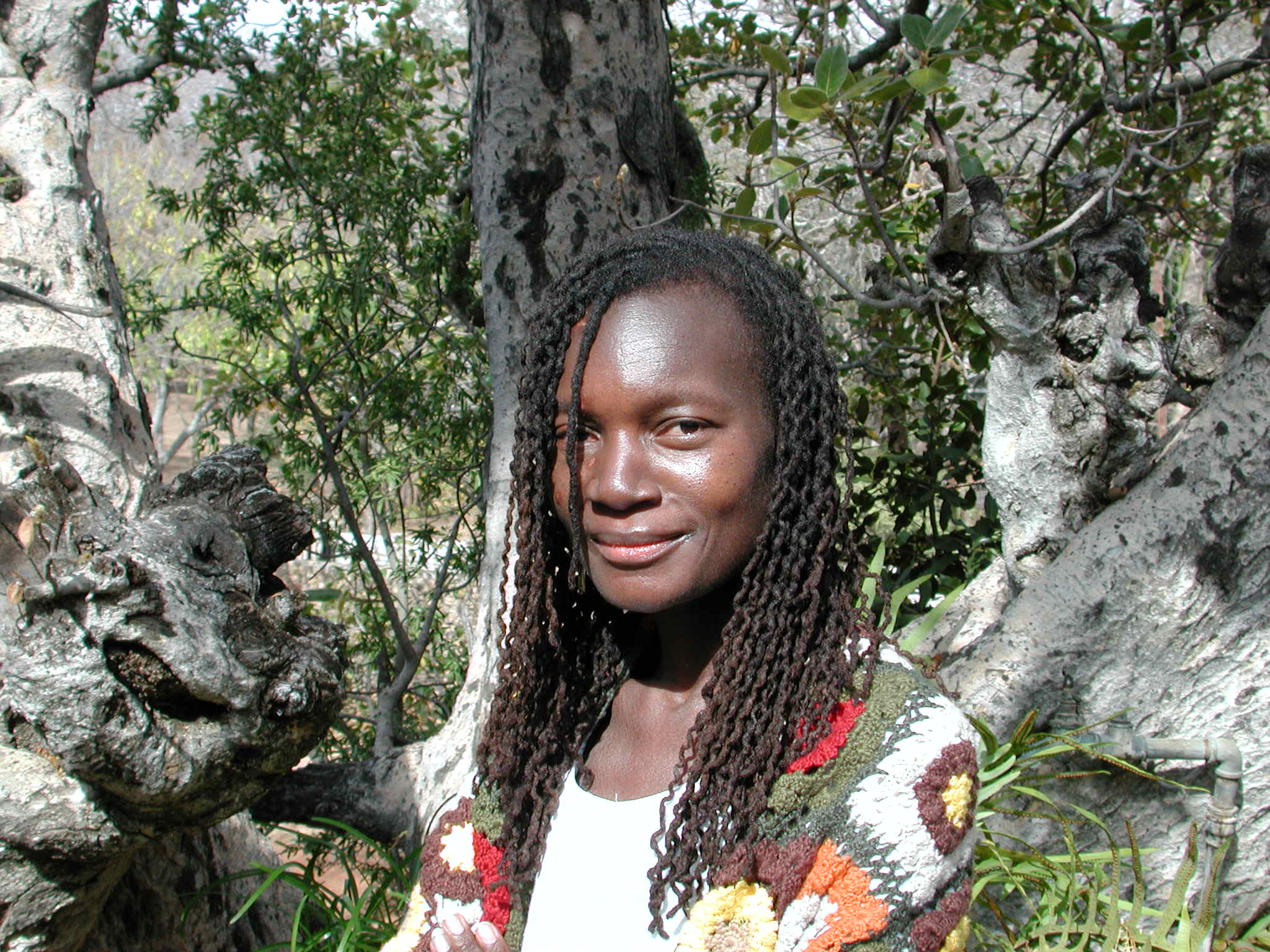
- Born: 19 September 1964; Bulawayo, Southern Rhodesia
- Died: 7 April 2005 (aged 40); Toronto, Canada
- Education: York University
- Occupations: Novelist, short story writer, arts administrator
- Era: 1992–2005
- Spouse: John Jose (m. 1987–2005)

Yvonne Vera (19 September 1964 – 7 April 2005) was an author from Zimbabwe. Her first published book was a collection of short stories, Why Don't You Carve Other Animals (1992), which was followed by five novels: Nehanda (1993), Without a Name (1994), Under the Tongue (1996), Butterfly Burning (1998), and The Stone Virgins (2002). According to the African Studies Center at the University of Leiden, "her novels are known for their poetic prose, difficult subject-matter, and their strong women characters, and are firmly rooted in Zimbabwe's difficult past." For these reasons, she has been widely studied and appreciated by those studying postcolonial African literature.

== Life ==
Vera was born in Bulawayo, in what was then Southern Rhodesia, to Jerry Vera and Ericah Gwetai. At the age of eight, she worked as a cotton-picker near Hartley. She attended Mzilikazi High School and then taught English literature at Njube High School, both in Bulawayo. In 1987, she immigrated to Canada and she married John Jose, a Canadian teacher whom she had met while he was teaching at Njube. At some point in the late 1980s, Vera was diagnosed as HIV-positive, but never shared this information during her lifetime. At York University, Toronto, she completed an undergraduate degree, a master's and a PhD, and taught literature.

In 1995, Vera separated from her husband and returned to Zimbabwe. In 1997, she became director of the National Gallery of Zimbabwe in Bulawayo, a gallery that showcases local talent ranging from that of professional artists to school children. She resigned in May 2003 because of the withdrawal of government funding, an exodus of local artists and a drop in visitors. In 2004, Vera returned to Canada with Jose to seek treatment. She died on 7 April 2005 of AIDS-related meningitis.

== Awards ==
- 1994: Commonwealth Writers' Prize (Africa) and Zimbabwe Publishers' Literary Award, for Without a Name
- 2002: Macmillan Writers' Prize for Africa for The Stone Virgins
- 2003: National Arts Merit Awards for Best Written Work.

== Works ==
While at university, Vera submitted a story to a Toronto magazine; the publisher asked for more, so she sat down to write them. Her collection of short stories, Why Don't You Carve Other Animals, was published in 1992. It was followed by five completed novels:

- Nehanda (Baobab Books, 1993), shortlisted for Commonwealth Writers' Prize
- Without a Name (Baobab Books, 1994), awarded Commonwealth Writers' Prize for Africa and Zimbabwe Publishers' Literary Award
- Under the Tongue (Baobab Books, 1996)
- Butterfly Burning (1998), awarded a German literary prize, LiBeraturpreis, in 2002
- The Stone Virgins (2002), awarded Macmillan Writers' Prize for Africa; extracted in New Daughters of Africa, edited by Margaret Busby, 2019

At the time of her death, Vera was working on a new novel, Obedience, which has never been published. Her other works have been published in Zimbabwe, Canada and several other countries, including translations into Spanish, Italian and Swedish.

Vera wrote obsessively, often for 10 hours a day, and described time when she was not writing as "a period of fasting". Her work was passionate and lyrical. She took on themes such as rape, incest and infanticide, and gender inequality in Zimbabwe before and after the country's war of independence with sensitivity and courage. She said: "I would love to be remembered as a writer who had no fear for words and who had an intense love for her nation." In 2004, she was awarded the Swedish PEN Tucholsky Prize "for a corpus of works dealing with taboo subjects".

Vera also edited several anthologies by African women writers, including Opening Spaces: an Anthology of Contemporary African Women's Writing (Heinemann African Writers Series, 1999).

== See also ==
- Nehanda Nyakasikana
- TSAR Publications
