= List of years in Zimbabwe =

Years in Zimbabwe

This is a list of years in Zimbabwe.

== Early history ==
- BC Zimbabwe - Early AD Zimbabwe

== The Conquests ==
- 1600s - 1610s - 1620s - 1630s - 1640s - 1650s - 1660s - 1670s - 1680s - 1690s
- 1700s - 1710s - 1720s - 1730s - 1740s - 1750s - 1760s - 1770s - 1780s - 1790s
- 1800s - 1810s - 1820s - 1830s - 1840s - 1850s - 1860s - 1870s - 1880s - 1890s
- 1900s: 1900 - 1901 - 1902 - 1903 - 1904 - 1905 - 1906 - 1907 - 1908 - 1909
- 1910s: 1910 - 1911 - 1912 - 1913 - 1914 - 1915 - 1916 - 1917 - 1918 - 1919
- 1920s: 1920 - 1921 - 1922

== Southern Rhodesia ==
- 1920s: 1923 - 1924 - 1925 - 1926 - 1927 - 1928 - 1929
- 1930s: 1930 - 1931 - 1932 - 1933 - 1934 - 1935 - 1936 - 1937 - 1938 - 1939
- 1940s: 1940 - 1941 - 1942 - 1943 - 1944 - 1945 - 1946 - 1947 - 1948 - 1949
- 1950s: 1950 - 1951 - 1952 - 1953 - 1954 - 1955 - 1956 - 1957 - 1958 - 1959
- 1960s: 1960 - 1961 - 1962 - 1963

== Rhodesia ==
- 1960s: 1964 - 1965 - 1966 - 1967 - 1968 - 1969
- 1970s: 1970 - 1971 - 1972 - 1973 - 1974 - 1975 - 1976 - 1977 - 1978

== Zimbabwe-Rhodesia ==
- 1979

== Zimbabwe ==
- 1980s: 1980 - 1981 - 1982 - 1983 - 1984 - 1985 - 1986 - 1987 - 1988 - 1989
- 1990s: 1990 - 1991 - 1992 - 1993 - 1994 - 1995 - 1996 - 1997 - 1998 - 1999
- 2000s: 2000 - 2001 - 2002 - 2003 - 2004 - 2005 - 2006 - 2007 - 2008 - 2009
- 2010s: 2010 - 2011 - 2012 - 2013 - 2014 - 2015 - 2016 - 2017 - 2018 - 2019
- 2020s: 2020 - 2021 - 2022 - 2023 - 2024 - 2025

== See also ==
- Timeline of Bulawayo
- Timeline of Harare
- List of years by country

== Bibliography ==
- "Zimbabwe". Political Chronology of Africa. Political Chronologies of the World. Europa Publications. 2001. p. 467+. ISBN 0203409957.
- "Key dates in Zimbabwe's recent history", The Guardian, UK, 6 June 2008
- Andreas Mehler; et al., eds. (2008). "Zimbabwe". Africa Yearbook: Politics, Economy and Society South of the Sahara in 2007. Vol. 4. Koninklijke Brill. ISSN 1871-2525.
- Andreas Mehler; et al., eds. (2013). "Zimbabwe". Africa Yearbook: Politics, Economy and Society South of the Sahara in 2012. Vol. 9. Koninklijke Brill. ISSN 1871-2525.
- Alois S. Mlambo (2014). "Timeline". History of Zimbabwe. Cambridge University Press. ISBN 978-1-107-02170-9.
