= 1979 in Rhodesia, Zimbabwe Rhodesia and Southern Rhodesia =

- Decades: 1960s; 1970s
- See also: Other events of 1979; Timeline of Rhodesian history

- Decades
- See also: Other events of 1979

- Decades: 1950s; 1960s
- See also: Other events of 1979; Timeline of Southern Rhodesian history

The following lists events that happened during 1979 in Rhodesia (to 1 June), Zimbabwe Rhodesia (from 1 June to 12 December) and Southern Rhodesia (from 12 December).

== Incumbents ==
- President: Josiah Zion Gumede (starting 1 June and ending 12 December)
- Prime Minister: Abel Muzorewa (starting 1 June and ending 12 December)

== Events ==
- 12 February - Air Rhodesia Flight 827 was shot down by guerillas, killing 59.
- 1 June - Rhodesia becomes Zimbabwe Rhodesia as an interim state.
- 12 December - In line with the terms of the Lancaster House Agreement, Zimbabwe Rhodesia formally returns to colonial status as the "British Dependency of Southern Rhodesia".

== Births ==
- 20 August — Mandy Leach, freestyle swimmer

== See also ==
- 1978 in Rhodesia
- other events of 1979
- 1979 in the environment
- 1980 in Zimbabwe
- Years in Zimbabwe
