= 2021 in Zimbabwe =

- Decades: 2000s; 2010s; 2020s
- See also: Other events of 2021; Timeline of Zimbabwean history

Events of 2021 in Zimbabwe.

== Incumbents ==
- President: Emmerson Mnangagwa
- Vice President
  - Constantino Chiwenga (1st)
  - Kembo Mohadi (2nd, until 1 March)

== Events ==
Ongoing: COVID-19 pandemic in Zimbabwe

- 13 January – COVID-19 pandemic: Traditional funerals are banned as infections increase.
- 19 January – President Mnangagwa says the United States has no standing to impose sanctions on Zimbabwe following the 2021 United States Capitol attack.
- 24 January – COVID-19: A fourth member of the Cabinet of Zimbabwe dies in two weeks.
- 27 January – Journalist Hopewell Chin'ono is released on bail after three weeks in prison. Chin’ono accuses Mnangagwa's administration of human rights abuses and corruption; the government accuses Chin’ono of spreading false information and inciting violence.
- 1 March – Second vice president Kembo Mohadi resigns after allegations of sexual misconduct.

== Deaths ==
- 12 January – Lazarus Takawira, 68, sculptor; COVID-19.
- 15 January – Ellen Gwaradzimba, 60, Minister for Manicaland; COVID-19.
- 19 January – Stephen Lungu, 78, evangelist; COVID-19.
- 20 January – Sibusiso Moyo, 61, politician, Ministry of Foreign Affairs; COVID-19.
- 22 January – Aeneas Chigwedere, 81, politician, Minister of Education (2001–2008) and Governor of Mashonaland East (2008–2013); COVID-19.
- 22 January – Joel Matiza, 60, politician, Minister for Transport and Infrastructural Development; COVID-19.
- 22 January – Paradzai Zimondi, 73, former major-general and commissioner-general of Zimbabwe's prisons and corrections services; COVID-19.
- 25 January – David Katzenstein, 69, international HIV and global health expert based in Harare; COVID-19.
- 25 January – Nicholas McNally, supreme court judge.
- 16 February – Soul Jah Love (real name Soul Musaka), 31, Zimdancehall singer; diabetes.
- 7 March – Janice McLaughlin, 79, Maryknoll sister and human rights campaigner.
- 25 June – Ahmed Bilal Shah, 67, medical doctor and TV presenter; COVID-19.
- 7 July – Edzai Absolom Chimonyo, 68, commander of the Zimbabwe National Army; cancer.
- 13 July – Sandra Nyaira, 46, investigative journalist; COVID-19.
- 14 & 19 July – Helen Lieros, 81, painter, followed by her husband Derek Huggins, 80. Together they founded Harare's Gallery Delta.
- 29 July – Janet Banana, 83, former First Lady; kidney failure.
- 6 August – Jane Ngwenya, 86, politician.
- 7 August – Robert Martin Gumbura, 65, disgraced religious leader and convicted rapist; COVID-19.
- 11 August – Rejoice Timire, 62, activist and politician, senator; COVID-19.
- 24 August – George 'Mastermind' Shaya, 72, five-time Soccer Star of the Year.
- 9 September – Christopher Mapanga, 69, Zimbabwe's ambassador to Iran.
- 14 November – Simon Khaya-Moyo, 76, former Zanu–PF spokesperson, cabinet minister and ambassador; cancer.
- 29 November – Douglas Munatsi, 51, CEO of Zimbabwe Investment and Development Agency; carbon monoxide poisoning following house fire.

== See also ==
- COVID-19 pandemic in Africa
- African Continental Free Trade Area
