= 1980 in Southern Rhodesia and Zimbabwe =

- Decades: 1960s
- See also: Other events of 1980; Timeline of Southern Rhodesian history

- Decades: 1960s; 1970s; 1980s; 1990s; 2000s
- See also: Other events of 1980; Timeline of Zimbabwean history

The following lists events that happened during 1980 in Southern Rhodesia (to 17 April) and Zimbabwe (from 18 April).

== Incumbents ==
- President: Canaan Banana (Entered in office on 18 April1980)
- Prime Minister: Robert Mugabe (Entered in office on 18 April 1980)

== Events ==
- April 18 - Zimbabwe's independence from the United Kingdom was recognised internationally, and the country became a republic in the Commonwealth of Nations - which remained the case until December 2003, when Zimbabwe left the Commonwealth of Nations.
- April 18 - Canaan Banana, a Methodist minister and theologian, became the first President of Zimbabwe. Robert Mugabe became the first Prime Minister of Zimbabwe.
- July 31 - The Zimbabwean field hockey team won the gold medal in the 1980 Summer Olympics celebrated in Moscow (USSR) (see also Zimbabwe at the 1980 Summer Olympics and Field hockey at the 1980 Summer Olympics).
- August 25 - Zimbabwe joined the United Nations.
- November 8 - Enos Nkala made remarks at a rally in Bulawayo, in which he warned ZAPU that ZANU would deliver a few blows against them. This started the first Entumbane uprising, in which Zimbabwe People's Revolutionary Army and Zimbabwe African National Liberation Army fought for two days.

== Deaths ==
This section lists deaths in Zimbabwe during 1980.
