= United Nations Security Council Resolution 327 =

UN Security Council Resolution 327
- Date: 2 February 1973
- Meeting no.: 1,691
- Code: S/RES/327 (Document)
- Subject: Zambia's Decision to Impose Sanctions
- Voting summary: 14 voted for; None voted against; 1 abstained
- Result: Adopted

Security Council composition
- Permanent members: China; France; Soviet Union; United Kingdom; United States
- Non-permanent members: Australia; Austria; Guinea; India; Indonesia; Kenya; Panama; Peru; Sudan; Yugoslavia

United Nations Security Council Resolution 327, adopted on February 2, 1973, reaffirmed previous resolutions on the topic of Rhodesia and commended Zambia for its decision to immediately enforce sanctions. The United Nations plan to crush the Rhodesian government relied heavily on sanctions, Zambia had decided to enforce the sanctions when other nations chose not to despite the large impact the cessation of trade with Rhodesia would have on the Zambian economy. The Council decided to send the special mission established by resolution 326 to assess the needs of Zambia in maintaining alternate forms of communication and traffic, as most of it had flowed through Rhodesia in the past.

The resolution was approved with 14 votes in favour, while the Soviet Union abstained.

== See also ==
- History of Rhodesia
- History of Zambia
- List of United Nations Security Council Resolutions 301 to 400 (1971–1976)
