= 1946 in Southern Rhodesia =

- Years in Southern Rhodesia: 1943 1944 1945 1946 1947 1948 1949
- Centuries: 19th century · 20th century · 21st century
- Decades: 1910s 1920s 1930s 1940s 1950s 1960s 1970s
- Years: 1943 1944 1945 1946 1947 1948 1949

The following lists events that happened during 1946 in Southern Rhodesia.

== Incumbents ==
- Prime Minister: Godfrey Huggins

== Births ==
- August 1 - Nicholas Goche, politician
- September 15 - Emmerson Mnangagwa, politician
- November 4 - Quintin Goosen, cricketer and umpire
