= United Nations Security Council Resolution 328 =

UN Security Council Resolution 328
- Date: 10 March 1973
- Meeting no.: 1,694
- Code: S/RES/328 (Document)
- Subject: Southern Rhodesia
- Voting summary: 13 voted for; None voted against; 2 abstained
- Result: Adopted

Security Council composition
- Permanent members: China; France; Soviet Union; United Kingdom; United States
- Non-permanent members: Australia; Austria; Guinea; India; Indonesia; Kenya; Panama; Peru; Sudan; Yugoslavia

United Nations Security Council Resolution 328, adopted on March 10, 1973, after receiving a report from the Special Mission established under resolution 326 and reaffirming previous statements the Council encouraged the United Kingdom, as the administering power, to convene a national constitutional conference where the "genuine representatives of the people of Zimbabwe" could work out a settlement relating to the future of the country.

The Council also called upon the government to take all effective measures to bring about the conditions necessary to enable the people of Rhodesia to exercise their right to self-determination, the unconditional release of all political prisoners/detainees/restrictees, the repeal of all repressive and discriminatory legislation and re removal of all restriction on political activity.

The resolution was approved by 13 votes to none against; the United Kingdom and United States abstained from the vote.

== See also ==
- History of Rhodesia
- History of Zambia
- List of United Nations Security Council Resolutions 301 to 400 (1971–1976)
