= Politics of Rhodesia =

Rhodesia was originally a unitary parliamentary constitutional monarchy under Elizabeth II. After the 1969 Rhodesian constitutional referendum, which asked voters if they supported a republic and passed with 81.01% saying yes, it became a unitary parliamentary republic.

After Rhodesia's Unilateral Declaration of Independence from the United Kingdom in 1965, which made it an unrecognised state, the political party that held sway was the Rhodesian Front, later known as the Republican Front. Ian Smith remained as Prime Minister until the country became Zimbabwe Rhodesia in 1979.

Rhodesia had a limited form of democracy in the sense that it had a Westminster parliamentary system with multiple political parties contesting seats in parliament. However, as voting was dominated by the white settler minority, and black Africans only had a minority level of representation at that time, it was internationally regarded as a structurally racist and unequal system, and an example of Herrenvolk democracy.

== Political system ==
=== 1961 constitution ===
From 1899 to 1962, the unicameral Legislative Assembly comprised members elected to represent constituencies on a first past the post principle. At some stages, however, there were two-member constituencies, and in the early years there were some appointed members. Under the Constitution, there was provision for the establishment of an upper house to be known as the Legislative Council, but none was ever established. After the 1961 Southern Rhodesian constitutional referendum, the 1961 Constitution adopted a more complex system intended to extend the franchise to wider sections of the community including non-whites – but without bringing white rule to an end.

At the time of the Unilateral Declaration of Independence (UDI), Rhodesia's amended 1961 Constitution (which was annexed to the UDI) provided for an Officer Administering the Government, to be appointed by Parliament if the Queen did not appoint a Governor-General. Political power continued to reside with the Legislative Assembly.

Under the 1961 Constitution, the Legislative Assembly had 65 elected members: 50 constituency members and 15 district members. The voter rolls had education, property and income qualifications. The main A roll was for citizens who satisfied high standards in these regards and 95% of its members were white and 5% were black or Asian. The B roll had lower qualification standards, and 90% of its members were black and 10% were white or Asian. The B roll was about one-tenth of the size of the A roll. Both rolls voted in elections for constituencies and districts, but for elections in the constituencies, the B roll vote was capped at 20% of the total, and for elections in the districts, the A roll vote was capped at 20% of the total. This procedure was known as 'cross-voting'. In practice, the 50 constituency members would all be white and the 15 district members would mostly be black.

=== 1962 election ===
The 1962 Southern Rhodesian general election was a watershed for the country, since it resulted in the election of a Rhodesian Front government led by Winston Field, which was committed to independence without majority rule and to the continued separate development of white and black communities in Rhodesia. The defeated United Federal Party led by Edgar Whitehead had been committed to gradual progress to majority rule.

African nationalist groups objected to the 1961 constitution and urged those eligible to vote not to register, and those that had registered not to vote. Relatively few eligible Africans did register to vote, and B-roll voter turnout in the 1962 election was less than 25%.

Ian Smith and other Rhodesians claimed that this political arrangement would have resulted in an evolutionary transition to black majority rule, which would have avoided the rushed transition that had caused difficulty in other African countries. Critics maintain that the stubborn refusal to make immediate and visible progress to majority rule in the early 1960s set in motion events which are causing serious trouble in modern Zimbabwe to this day.

=== Constitutional revisions in 1965 ===
In 1965 there were revisions to the Constitution that reflected the new status of the nation after UDI. Primarily, the revisions erased the rights of the British Government to legislate and act on behalf of Rhodesia, and provided for further constitutional amendments on a two-thirds majority of parliament. The Officer Administering the Government was to be the Commander-In-Chief of the Armed Forces.

=== 1969 (UDI) constitution ===
The Rhodesian Front government eventually drafted a completely new constitution. This further entrenched white minority rule and made the country a republic, following the 1969 Rhodesian constitutional referendum in favour. Under this new constitution, there was a bicameral Parliament consisting of an indirectly elected Senate of Rhodesia and a directly elected House of Assembly of Rhodesia, in which the majority of seats were reserved for whites even more effectively than was the case under the Constitution of 1961. The new office of President was a ceremonial post, with executive power remaining with the Prime Minister.

The 1969 Constitution modified the detailed provision for electoral rolls and seats in the Assembly. The most significant modifications were that cross-voting was abolished and the B roll was reserved for non-Europeans. The Assembly constituencies were reformed so that there were 50 A-roll and 8 B-roll seats. It was provided that the number of B-roll seats would rise over time in line with the proportion of total personal income tax paid by blacks until a total of 50 black seats was reached. In addition to the B-roll seats, the African tribal chiefs were able to elect another 8 members. The immediate result of this arrangement was that 270,000 whites had 50 seats and 6 million Africans had 8 seats in the Assembly, with a handful of African chiefs having 8 seats as well.

The new Constitution gave a clear indication of where the architects of UDI thought Rhodesia should go in political terms. The concept of "separate development" for blacks and whites was written into that constitution. The concept of eventual parity of parliamentary representation between the races was also adopted. This last feature underpinned the concept of 'equal partnership between black and white' as an alternative to majority rule. However, the leaders of the UDI state made it clear that parity of representation could be deferred indefinitely, if not for ever. White immigration figures for the 1960s encouraged them to believe that it might be possible to significantly alter the demographic balance, given enough time.

== Politics in Rhodesia ==
The Rhodesian Front's victory in the 1962 general election and the subsequent UDI were in the populist tradition of Rhodesian politics. The early history of Rhodesian politics was very much one of the electoral uprisings by miners, industrial workers and farmers against the big business establishment that dominated the colony. The election of the Reform Party government led by Godfrey Huggins in 1933 had a great deal in common with the RF win in 1962. It has been argued that the racial dimension of UDI was an incidental thing. Economic recessions in the early 1930s and the early 1960s had both produced the election of populist governments committed to securing standards of living for working people (albeit, the immediate concern was for working white people). It is significant that in the 1962 election, the RF recruited a slate of black candidates to contest the district (essentially B roll) seats. Those black RF candidates obtained little support from the B roll electorate and none were elected.

Rhodesia in the UDI era never quite took on the character of a one-party state. Although the Bush War was the real political contest, there was a conventional political opposition to the RF throughout the UDI period. The opposition came from white liberals who contested A roll seats in general elections and from some black parties that would contest B roll seats. The main white opposition was the Rhodesia Party, associated with veteran liberal politician (and former district Assembly member) Dr Ahrn Palley. In the 1974 general election, Dr Palley came within 3 votes of taking Salisbury (City) from the RF. In that same election, Michael Auret took about 30% of the vote for the RP in Bulawayo (District). Auret later won Harare (Central) for the MDC in the Zimbabwe parliamentary elections, 2000.

The RP did manage to secure around 20% of the white vote nationally on a regular basis and it would pick up most of the non-white constituency votes, but the first-past-the-post electoral system meant that they never won seats in the Assembly. Widespread press censorship and government control of radio and TV inhibited opposition activity. The lack of an effective parliamentary opposition is one factor that made it difficult to end UDI when this measure had become clearly necessary.

RP activists considered that most of their support came from the business elite, the professional class and second- or third-generation Rhodesians. The more recent white immigrants tended to vote overwhelmingly for the RF. It has been suggested that Rhodesia hosted a peculiar brand of white politics traceable to British working-class immigrants who during the 20th century brought their successful struggle for a generous social welfare state out to the colonies.

My mother could not afford to pay school fees and I would not have received an education if the government of Rhodesia had not simply treated me like a special citizen and given me a free education of a very high standard.

— Eddie Cross, Chairman of the Confederation of Zimbabwe Industry and Economic Secretary of the Movement for Democratic Change, 2004

The RP group did not contest the 1977 general election because many of its activists had either been taken into one or other of various forms of detention or had been forced into exile. Michael Auret was expelled from Rhodesia in 1976 and told that he would be arrested immediately if he returned. Auret was unable to return home until 1980. The Rhodesian government was never tolerant of dissent throughout the UDI period, but it became positively repressive as the final debacle approached. The liberal former Prime Minister Garfield Todd and members of his family were subject to various forms of detention and house arrest.

The final political events in white Rhodesia were the 1977 Rhodesian general election and the 1979 constitutional referendum on extending equal voting rights to all citizens. An extreme right wing group known as the Rhodesian Action Party ('RAP') opposed the RF in the election and campaigned for a No vote in the referendum. The RAP group favoured a continuation of white minority rule and undertaking extreme military measures to win the Bush War. RAP attracted significant electoral support (15% of the referendum vote).

Some non-militant black groups and individuals contested and won B roll seats (often under the title "ANC Independent"). Under the 1969 constitution, the B roll was reserved exclusively for non-Europeans. This black political grouping was one of those that participated in the 1979 Internal Settlement. Association with the UDI state and with the internal settlement carried a collaborationist stigma that would damage the credibility of the black politicians involved.

== The end of Rhodesia ==
When white minority rule was no longer tenable, Rhodesia moved first to a form of power sharing ('the internal settlement') and then to majority rule (see 1979 Rhodesian general election). At this point Rhodesia ceased to exist as a political entity and was replaced by Zimbabwe Rhodesia.

The end of UDI and of the Bush War were associated with an abrupt transfer of power to the insurgent-backed, black political parties in 1980. Some observers feel that this resulted in some of the more stable elements in black civil society being marginalised. Consequently, Zimbabwe was not able to enjoy the benefits of a managed transfer to democracy of the kind that took place in comparable neighbouring countries such as Botswana and South Africa.

== See also ==
- Colonial history of Southern Rhodesia
- Southern Rhodesia African National Congress
- Zimbabwe African People's Union
- Zimbabwe People's Revolutionary Army
- Rhodesia (1964–1965)
- History of Rhodesia (1965–1979)
- 1960s in Rhodesia
- Political history of Zimbabwe
- Politics of Zimbabwe
