= 2026 in Zimbabwe =

- Decades: 2000s; 2010s; 2020s
- See also: Other events of 2026; Timeline of Zimbabwean history

Events of 2026 in Zimbabwe.

== Incumbents ==
- President: Emmerson Mnangagwa
- Vice President: Constantino Chiwenga

== Events ==
=== January ===
- 15 January – 6 February – 2026 Under-19 Men's Cricket World Cup

=== February ===
- 19 February – Health authorities begin rolling out lenacapavir – a long-acting HIV prevention drug – targeting over 46,000 high-risk individuals across 24 sites.
- 25 February – The government suspends exports of raw minerals and lithium concentrate.

=== March ===
- 2 March – The government grants amnesty to 4,305 prisoners.

=== April ===
- 16 April – A minibus catches fire near Bulawayo, killing 18 people.

=== May ===
- 5 May – A bus crashes near Suswe, killing 10 people and injuring 45 others.
- 27 May – A bus collides with a truck near Kwekwe, killing 10 people.

=== June ===
- 3 June – Zimbabwe is elected to a rotating seat at the United Nations Security Council.
- 10 June – A minibus carrying schoolchildren catches fire in Gweru, killing seven passengers.
- 16 June – A freight train collides with a bus at a railway crossing in Triangle, killing nine people and injuring 25.
- 19 June – The National Assembly passes a constitutional amendment extending presidential and parliamentary terms from five to seven years, and replacing direct presidential elections with selection by Parliament.

=== July ===
- 6 July – A nationwide power blackout occurs after a technical fault on the national electricity grid of the state-owned utility ZESA.

=== August ===
- 11 August – 2026 Lake Kariba ferry accident: At least 94 people die after an over-capacity passenger ferry capsizes on Lake Kariba during heavy winds; 77 others are rescued.
- 28 August – At least 27 people are killed near Chivhu when a minibus carrying church members to a conference collides head-on with a haulage truck.

=== September ===
- 30 September – Six people, including businessman Wicknell Chivayo, are killed in a helicopter crash in Marondera.

== Holidays ==
- 1 January – New Year's Day
- 21 February – National Youth Day
- 3 April – Good Friday
- 4 April – Holy Saturday
- 6 April – Easter Monday
- 18 April – Independence Day
- 1 May – Labour Day
- 25 May – Africa Day
- 10 August – Heroes' Day
- 11 August – Defence Forces Day
- 22 December – National Unity Day
- 25 December – Christmas Day
- 26 December – Boxing Day

== Deaths ==
- 6 February – Blessed Geza, 82–83, politician and war veteran
- 30 September – Wicknell Chivayo, 43, energy industry executive
- 12 October – Sarah Dambanevana, 36, cricketer (national team)
