= 1948 in Southern Rhodesia =

- Years in Southern Rhodesia: 1945 1946 1947 1948 1949 1950 1951
- Centuries: 19th century · 20th century · 21st century
- Decades: 1910s 1920s 1930s 1940s 1950s 1960s 1970s
- Years: 1945 1946 1947 1948 1949 1950 1951

The following lists events that happened during 1948 in Southern Rhodesia.

== Incumbents ==
- Prime Minister: Godfrey Huggins

== Events ==
- The first general strike by African workers
- 10 December 1948: Southern Rhodesia did not vote in favor of the General Assembly's Universal Declaration of Human Rights

== Births ==
- October 8 - Josiah Tungamirai, politician, died (2005)
