= 1900s in Zimbabwe =

Mapondera and a force of 600 men revolted against the Colony of Southern Rhodesia near Mazowe in 1900. An indecisive battle took place near Mount Darwin between Mapondera and the Colony of Southern Rhodesia in 1901. Mashonaland and Matabeleland were united as Southern Rhodesia, administered by the British South Africa Company, on 24 January. In 1902 the government passed a law requiring all natives over the age of 14 to register and carry situpas (passes). Cecil Rhodes died at the age of 48 on 26 March. The Colony of Southern Rhodesia captured Mapondera, tried him, and sentenced him to seven years imprisonment for treason in 1903. He died in 1904 after a hunger strike.

== See also ==
- 1890s in Zimbabwe
- 1910s in Zimbabwe
- Years in Zimbabwe
