= 2027 in Zimbabwe =

- Decades: 2000s; 2010s; 2020s
- See also: Other events of 2027; Timeline of Zimbabwean history

Events of 2027 in Zimbabwe.

== Events ==
=== Predicted and scheduled ===
- 4 October – 21 November – 2027 Cricket World Cup in South Africa, Zimbabwe and Namibia

== Holidays ==
- 1 January – New Year's Day
- 21 February – National Youth Day
- 26 March – Good Friday
- 27 March – Holy Saturday
- 28 March – Easter Sunday
- 29 March – Easter Monday
- 18 April – Independence Day
- 1 May – Labour Day
- 25 May – Africa Day
- 10 August – Heroes' Day
- 11 August – Defence Forces Day
- 22 December – National Unity Day
- 25 December – Christmas Day
- 26 December – Boxing Day
