= Gibson Mashingaidze =

The Honourable Major General (Rtd.) Gibson Mashingaidze Sen.

Presidentially-appointed Senator
- Incumbent
- Assumed office 18 August 2026
- President: Emmerson Mnangagwa

Personal details
- Born: 1949 (age 76–77) Ushe, Bikita District

Military service
- Allegiance: ZANLA; Zimbabwe National Army
- Rank: Major General

Gibson Mashingaidze is a Zimbabwean Senator, former army general and head of Zimbabwean sports.

== History ==
He was born in Ushe, Bikita District 2 kilometres (1.2 mi) from Nyika Growth Point in Masvingo province in 1949. He went to Ushe primary school and then to Mashoko Secondary School. He joined the liberation war in the 1970s. He adopted the war name Comrade Tangai (Tangaimaona Povo). He rose through the ranks of ZANLA, a guerrilla movement waging a war against the Ian Smith regime. By the end of the liberation war in 1979 he had risen to become the Political commissar of Manica province (second in command to Gen Paradzai Zimondi who was the provincial commander, known as Comrade Tonderai Nyika at the time).

In 1981 he enrolled in the regular Zimbabwe National Army as a colonel alongside the likes of Chief Air Marshal Perrance Shiri, Air Marshal Henry Muchena, Lt Gen Edzai Chimonyo, Agripa Mutambara (subsequently Zimbabwe's ambassador to Mozambique), Philip Sibanda (Commander of the Zimbabwe Defence Forces) and Paradzai Zimondi (subsequently head of prisons and correction services). He worked in various capacities in the Zimbabwe National Army, including as commander of 4. Brigade in Masvingo province.

In 1996 he was involved in a controversial issue when he lambasted the government for neglecting a war veteran called Comrade Musa Mpofu who had died a pauper despite having been a celebrated guerrilla fighter during the liberation war. It is believed that Mashingaidze was reprimanded by the authorities for his criticism.

He participated in the 27 June 2008 presidential campaign together with Maj Gen Engelbert Rugeje, heading the Masvingo province campaign team. He was put on sanction lists which prevented certain named ZANU-PF personalities from visiting the USA and the European Union.

He was given a farm in Chiredzi under the land reform program. He has retired as a soldier and is now a farmer. He has been appointed to several boards, including The Sports Commission and Zimbabwe Broadcasting Holdings Board.
