= 2022 in Zimbabwe =

- Decades: 2000s; 2010s; 2020s
- See also: Other events of 2022; Timeline of Zimbabwean history

Events of 2022 in Zimbabwe.

== Incumbents ==
- President: Emmerson Mnangagwa
- Vice President
  - Constantino Chiwenga

== Events ==
Ongoing: COVID-19 pandemic in Zimbabwe

- 26 March – 2022 Zimbabwean by-elections.
- 15 April – At least 35 people are killed and 71 others are injured when a bus carrying churchgoers to an Easter gathering crashes in Chipinge.
- 26 May – Zimbabwean courts rule that the age of consent in Zimbabwe must be raised to 18.
- 31 May – Six African countries, on Zimbabwe's initiative, agree to restart trade in ivory as the population of elephants soars beyond sustainable levels.

== Deaths ==
- 27 January – Gwinyai Chingoka, tennis player (b. 1982)
- 31 January – Phyllis Ndlovu, politician
- 14 February – Charles Yohane, footballer (b. 1973)
- 7 April – Elvis Nyathi, refugee (b. 1979)
- 24 April – Collin Williams, cricket player (b. 1961)
- 27 April – John Gwitira, political activist (b. 1949)
- 15 May – Martin Munyanyi, Roman Catholic prelate (b. 1956)
- 26 May – Aldiglade Bhamu, footballer (b. 1987)
- 28 May – Christopher Kuruneri, politician (b. 1949)
- 5 June – Stanley Goreraza, military officer
- 5 June – Alex Magaisa, political advisor (b. 1975)
- 27 May – Mildred Reason Dube, politician
- 27 May – Giles Mutsekwa, politician (b. 1948)
- 17 July – Watson Khupe, politician (b. 1962)
- 1 August – Cont Mhlanga, actor (b. 1957)

== See also ==
- COVID-19 pandemic in Africa
- African Continental Free Trade Area
