= 1935 in Southern Rhodesia =

- Decades: 1910s; 1920s; 1930s; 1940s; 1950s
- See also: Other events of 1935; Timeline of Southern Rhodesian history

The following lists events that happened during 1935 in Southern Rhodesia.

== Incumbents ==
- Prime Minister: Godfrey Huggins

== Events ==
- Rhodesian Air Force is established under the name Southern Rhodesia Staff Corps Air Unit

== Births ==
- August 22 - Christopher Chetsanga, scientist
- September 3 - Dorothy Masuka, jazz singer
- October 2 - Edson Zvobgo, politician (died 2004)
