= 2023 in Zimbabwe =

- Decades: 2000s; 2010s; 2020s
- See also: Other events of 2023; Timeline of Zimbabwean history

The following events occurred in Zimbabwe in the year 2023.

== Incumbents ==
- President: Emmerson Mnangagwa
- Vice President
  - Constantino Chiwenga

== Events ==
Ongoing: COVID-19 pandemic in Zimbabwe

11 November 2023 to 9 December 2023: 2023 Zimbabwean by-elections.

=== January ===
- 14 January – Police arrest and beat opposition MP Costa Machingauta and 25 others for participating in an alleged illegal gathering at the MP’s house in Harare.
- 22 January – The Zimbabwean authorities revoke the registration of 291 nongovernmental and civil society organizations for “noncompliance with the Private Voluntary Organisations Act.”

=== February ===
- President Emmerson Mnangagwa defends the PVO Amendment Bill, claiming it is necessary to protect Zimbabwe’s sovereignty from foreign influence.

=== March ===
- 4 March – Police shut down a concert by reggae and dancehall artist Winky D, citing lyrics critical of social and political conditions.

=== April ===
- 28 April – Jacob Ngarivhume, leader of Transform Zimbabwe, is sentenced to four years in prison for inciting public violence via a 2020 social media post.

=== May ===
- 17 May – Six University of Zimbabwe students are arrested for peacefully protesting the persecution of opposition politicians; they are released on bail after two months.

=== July ===
- 14 July – President Emmerson Mnangagwa signs the Criminal Law Codification and Reform Amendment Bill, allowing prosecution of those deemed to undermine the country or spread false information abroad.

=== August ===
- 26 August – 2023 Zimbabwean general election: President Emmerson Mnangagwa is re-elected to a second term with 52.6% of the vote, defeating main challenger Nelson Chamisa who garners 44%. Mnangagwa's ZANU–PF also wins a majority in the National Assembly elections. Chamisa's Citizens Coalition for Change rejects the results, alleging electoral irregularities.
- A CCC supporter is killed in clashes with suspected ZANU-PF supporters in Glen Norah, Harare. 11 people are charged with public violence.

=== September ===
- 20 September – The US Embassy issues a statement condemning post-election violence and intimidation, emphasizing the right to live free of fear and to fair treatment under the law.
- A CCC MP is abducted, tortured, and later released. Another MP is held overnight on criminal charges but released due to lack of evidence.

=== October ===
- 12 October – 2023 Zimbabwe cholera outbreak: Zimbabwe bans gatherings of more than 50 people amid a cholera outbreak in the country.

=== November ===
- 18-24 November – The World Antimicrobial Resistance Awareness Week 2023 is held in Harare, including the launch of its National Action Plan on 20 November and multiple public engagement activities.

=== December ===
- 4-9 December – Zimbabwe hosts the 22nd International Conference on AIDS and STIs in Africa.

== Deaths ==
- 31 October – Shepherd Gundu Chengeta, 57, politician and senate member
- 14 November – Tapfumaneyi Masaya, 51–52, bishop and political activist

== See also ==
- COVID-19 pandemic in Africa
- African Continental Free Trade Area
