= 1840s in Zimbabwe =

== Events ==
=== 1849 ===
- Dr. David Livingstone, explored the interior of Africa, arrived at Lake Ngami in present-day Botswana on 3 August 1849.

== Births ==
- Mapondera, militant, was born into the Rozvi Negomo dynasty

== See also ==
- Other events of 1840s
- 1850s in Zimbabwe
- Years in Zimbabwe
