= 1870s in Zimbabwe =

== Events ==
=== 1870 ===
- The first of Lobengula's royal towns called Bulawayo, is founded in 1870 (and will be destroyed in 1881).

=== 1871 ===
- Europeans start to excavate the late Iron Age's capital city, Great Zimbabwe
- The border post Mpandamatenga established close to modern Botswana

=== 1872 ===
- Tati Concessions Land in the Matabele kingdom granted to Sir John Swinburne

=== 1876 ===
- Zambesi Mission, a Catholic prefecture division is established

== Births ==
- Wardlaw Brown Thomson, rugby union international born in Matabeleland
- Fraser Russell, 3 time governor of Southern Rhodesia (dies 1952)
- Alfred Mulock Bentley, founder of the Rhodesian Stock Exchange (dies 1952)

== See also ==
- 1860s in Zimbabwe
- other events of 1870s
- 1880s in Zimbabwe
- Years in Zimbabwe
