= 2024 in Zimbabwe =

- Decades: 2000s; 2010s; 2020s
- See also: Other events of 2024; Timeline of Zimbabwean history

Events of 2024 in Zimbabwe.

== Incumbents ==
- President: Emmerson Mnangagwa
- Vice President
  - Constantino Chiwenga

== Events ==
=== January ===
- 6–18 January – Zimbabwean cricket team in Sri Lanka in 2023–24

=== March ===
- 4 March – The United States imposes sanctions on President Emmerson Mnangagwa, his wife Auxillia Mnangagwa, Vice President Constantino Chiwenga and 11 other Zimbabwean individuals and entities for involvement in human rights abuses, corruption, and minerals smuggling.

=== April ===
- 3 April – President Emmerson Mnangagwa declares a state of national disaster due to a drought that wipes out half the country's maize crop.
- 5 April – The Reserve Bank of Zimbabwe introduces the Zimbabwe Gold (ZiG) as the country's new currency to replace the 5th Zimbabwean dollar as from 8 April.

=== August ===
- 17 August – The Southern African Development Community holds its first summit in Harare in a decade.

=== October ===
- 14 October – The first two cases of mpox in Zimbabwe are recorded in a child in Harare who had travelled to South Africa and a 24-year old patient in Mberengwa who had travelled to Tanzania.
- 16 October – The government announces compensation payments for white farmers displaced by the expropriation program of former president Robert Mugabe in the 2000s.

=== November ===
- 23 November – Jameson Timba, the leader of a faction of the opposition Citizens Coalition for Change, is convicted along with 34 others on charges of unlawful assembly after being arrested at Timba's house in Harare in June. They are sentenced to a maximum suspended two-year prison sentence on 27 November.

=== December ===
- 3 December – The High Court strikes down a ban on women aged under 18 years and those raped by their husbands from availing of abortion services.
- 20 December – The government allows farmers who received land expropriated from white people under the controversial land reform program to sell its ownership to "indigenous" Zimbabweans.
- 31 December – President Emmerson Mnangagwa signs a law abolishing capital punishment in Zimbabwe.

== Holidays ==
- 1 January - New Year's Day
- 21 February - National Youth Day
- 29 March – Good Friday
- 30 March – Holy Saturday
- 31 March - Easter Sunday
- 1 April - Easter Monday
- 18 April – Independence Day
- 1 May - Labour Day
- 25 May - Africa Day
- 12 August - Heroes' Day
- 13 August - Defence Forces Day
- 22 December – National Unity Day
- 25 December – Christmas Day
- 26 December – Boxing Day
