= 1934 in Southern Rhodesia =

- Decades: 1910s; 1920s; 1930s; 1940s; 1950s
- See also: Other events of 1934; Timeline of Southern Rhodesian history

The following lists events that happened during 1934 in Southern Rhodesia.

== Incumbents ==
- Prime Minister: Godfrey Huggins

== Events ==
- The African National Council is formed under the leadership of Aaron Jacha
