= 1923 in Southern Rhodesia =

- Decades: 1900s; 1910s; 1920s; 1930s; 1940s
- See also: Other events of 1923; Timeline of Southern Rhodesian history

The following lists events that happened during 1923 in Southern Rhodesia.

== Incumbents ==
- Prime Minister: Charles Coghlan

== Events ==
- Abraham Twala forms the Rhodesian Bantu Voters' Association

=== September ===
- 21 September - The British South Africa Company's rule is terminated. Southern Rhodesia becomes a full self-governing colony, effective from the 1 October.
