= 1919 in Southern Rhodesia =

- Decades: 1890s; 1900s; 1910s; 1920s; 1930s
- See also: Other events of 1919; Timeline of Southern Rhodesian history

The following lists events that happened during 1919 in the Colony of Southern Rhodesia.

== Births ==
- 8 April - Ian Douglas Smith, Prime Minister of Rhodesia from 1965 to 1979, is born in Selukwe (died 2007)
