= 1880s in Zimbabwe =

== 1888 ==
- 11 February - Matabeleland is declared a British South Africa Company protectorate but this is not recognized by the Ndebele
- 30 October - Britain renames the region Zambesia

== 1889 ==
- 29 October - Charter is given to the British South Africa Company in Mashonaland and Matabeleland.

== See also ==
- 1870s in Zimbabwe
- other events of 1880s
- 1890s in Zimbabwe
- Years in Zimbabwe
