= 2025 in Zimbabwe =

- Decades: 2000s; 2010s; 2020s
- See also: Other events of 2025; Timeline of Zimbabwean history

Events of 2025 in Zimbabwe.

== Incumbents ==
- President: Emmerson Mnangagwa
- Vice President: Constantino Chiwenga

== Events ==
=== February ===
- 6 February – A Hongdu JL-8 of the Air Force of Zimbabwe crashes near Gweru, killing the pilot.
- 13 February – A bus collides with a truck near Beitbridge, killing 24 people and injuring 30 others.

=== March ===
- 9 March – A dam collapses at a farm in Chipinge, killing five people and leaving two others missing.
- 19 March – A collision involving a van and two trucks at a junction near Dzivarasekwa kills seven people and injures eight others.
- 20 March – Sports minister Kirsty Coventry becomes the first African and the first woman to be elected as president of the International Olympic Committee.
- 25 March – Zimbabwe National Army commander Anselem Nhamo Sanyatwe is appointed by President Mnangagwa as Sports Minister to replace Kirsty Coventry.
- 31 March – M31 Movement: Ninety-five people are arrested following anti-government protests in Harare organized by former ZANU–PF member Blessed Geza.

=== May ===
- 27 May – President Mnangagwa signs into law an amendment into the Broadcasting Services Act requiring motorists to pay a radio tax funding the Zimbabwe Broadcasting Corporation in order to obtain a driver's licence and vehicle registration.
- 30 May – A Chengdu J-7 of the Air Force of Zimbabwe catches fire and crashes near Gweru, killing the pilot.

=== July ===
- 19 July – Zimbabwe qualifies for the Rugby World Cup for the first time since 1991 after defeating Namibia 30-16 at the 2025 Rugby Africa Cup in Uganda.
- 22 July – A minibus taxi and a truck collide near Chitungwiza, killing 17 people.

=== August ===
- 8 August – The United States suspends the processing of all regular visa applications from Zimbabwe amid efforts by the Trump administration against irregular migration.

=== October ===
- 1 October – Robert Mugabe Jr., the son of former president Robert Mugabe, is arrested in Harare for possessing cannabis.

=== December ===
- 16 December – US President Donald Trump issues a proclamation imposing partial travel restrictions on Zimbabwean nationals travelling to the United States.

== Holidays ==
- 1 January – New Year's Day
- 21 February – National Youth Day
- 18 April – Independence Day
- 18 April – Good Friday
- 19 April – Holy Saturday
- 21 April – Easter Monday
- 1 May – Labour Day
- 25 May – Africa Day
- 11 August – Heroes' Day
- 12 August – Defence Forces Day
- 22 December – National Unity Day
- 25 December – Christmas Day
- 26 December – Boxing Day

== Deaths ==
- 23 March – Geoffrey Nyarota, 74, journalist and human rights activist.
- 10 October – Desire Moyo, 45, MP (since 2023) and poet.
- 20 November – Paul Mwazha, 107, clergyman.
