= 1914 in Southern Rhodesia =

- Decades: 1890s; 1900s; 1910s; 1920s; 1930s
- See also: Other events of 1914; Timeline of Southern Rhodesian history

The following lists events that happened during 1914 in Southern Rhodesia.

== Events ==
- The Nyamanda and Matabele National Home Movement stages a protest against the decision to vary "native" reserves in quality and size
