= 1975 in Rhodesia =

- Decades: 1960s; 1970s
- See also: Other events of 1975; Timeline of Rhodesian history

The following lists events that happened during 1975 in the Republic of Rhodesia.

== Incumbents ==
- President: Clifford Dupont (until 31 December), Henry Everard (starting 31 December)
- Prime Minister: Ian Smith

== Events ==
=== January ===
- The ceasefire is broken when the Rhodesian government halts the release of detainees, alleging that the ceasefire is not being observed and the United African National Council counterclaim that agreements on freedom of political activity for Africans are not being honoured.

=== February ===
- 16 February – At a meeting in Cape Town, South African Prime Minister B. J. Vorster informed visiting Prime Minister Ian Smith that the white minority government of South Africa would no longer provide troops to protect Rhodesia's white minority government. Smith, who had been reassured earlier of the Vorster government's support, said later that the decision had struck him "like a bolt from the blue". Rhodesia's government would fall in 1979, as a black majority government took power and the nation was renamed Zimbabwe.

=== March ===
- 15 March – Ian Smith, Rhodesian Prime Minister, and senior ministers visit South Africa for talks
- 18 March – Rhodesia's Diplomatic Mission in Lisbon, Portugal is told to leave by 30 April

=== June ===
- 15 June – Meeting between Ian Smith and the United African National Council ends in deadlock over venue for constitutional conference

=== August ===
- 9 August – Bishop Abel Muzorewa and James Callaghan hold talks in London
- 25–25 August – The Victoria Falls Conference is held in a South African Railways coach on the Victoria Falls Bridge between Ian Smith, Rhodesian Prime Minister and the United African National Council. The conference is officiated by Kenneth Kaunda, President of Zambia and John Vorster, the South African Prime Minister/

=== September ===
- 4 September – Zimbabwe African People's Union and the United African National Council split

=== December ===
- 23 December – 21 people are killed in a lightning strike on a hut in which people were seeking shelter from the rain in the eastern part of the country. As of 2022, it is the deadliest direct lightning strike in recorded history.
- Negotiations open between Ian Smith, the Rhodesian Prime Minister and Joshua Nkomo, the Zimbabwe African People's Union leader
