= 1972 in Rhodesia =

- Decades: 1960s; 1970s
- See also: Other events of 1972; Timeline of Rhodesian history

The following lists events that happened during 1972 in Rhodesia.

== Incumbents ==
- President: Clifford Dupont
- Prime Minister: Ian Smith

== January ==
- 11 January – 11 March – The Pearce Commission arrives in Rhodesia to conduct tests of acceptability of settlement proposals which was agreed on in 1971

== March ==
- 10 March – The African National Council is transformed into a political organisation and calls for a constitutional conference

== May ==
- 31 May – The United States Senate votes against re-imposition of embargo on Rhodesian chromite.

== August ==
- 22 August – International Olympic Committee asks Rhodesia to withdraw from the 20th Olympic Summer Games held in Munich, Germany

== December ==
- 21 December – Guerrillas of the Zimbabwe African National Liberation Army (ZANLA) attack Altena farm in Centenary area, marking an unprecedented escalation of the Rhodesian Bush War.

== Births ==
- 29 September – Abel Chimukoko, long-distance runner
