= 1922 in Southern Rhodesia =

- Decades: 1900s; 1910s; 1920s; 1930s; 1940s
- See also: Other events of 1922; Timeline of Southern Rhodesian history

The following lists events that happened during 1922 in Southern Rhodesia.

== Events ==
=== October ===
- 27 October - The Southern Rhodesia government referendum takes place and voters reject a union with South Africa.
