= 1950s in Southern Rhodesia =

The Native Land Husbandry Act was passed in 1951.

Morgan Tsvangirai, the head of the Movement for Democratic Change, was born in Gutu, Masvingo Province on 10 March 1952.

Garfield Todd of the United Rhodesia Party became the Prime Minister of Southern Rhodesia in 1953. That same year, a referendum was held to decide if Southern Rhodesia should join with Northern Rhodesia, and Nyasaland. The Federation of Rhodesia and Nyasaland formed on 1 August.

The City Youth League formed in 1955. That same year, the government passed the Public Order Act, giving the police the power to detain and restrict individuals without trial.

The City Youth League organized a bus boycott in Salisbury in 1956. Police arrested 200 CYL members.

== See also ==
- Years in Zimbabwe
