= Martha Ngano =

- Born: South Africa
- Citizenship: South African
- Occupations: Activist, organizer
- Years active: 1890s–1920s
- Organization: Rhodesian Bantu Voters' Association
- Known for: African suffrage activism in Rhodesia
- Notable work: Advocacy for African voting rights and rural mobilization
- Title: General Secretary

Martha Ngano was a Rhodesian independence activist of South African origin, active between the 1890s and the 1920s.

== Overview ==
Ngano was a Fingo, and was known for her abilities as a speaker and organizer. Well educated, she came to Rhodesia from South Africa in 1897 and soon became active in local affairs. She worked to expand suffrage for Africans, criticizing the lack of education in the English language at a time when literacy in the language was a prerequisite for being able to vote. She became active in the Rhodesian Bantu Voters' Association (RBVA), expanding its reach into rural areas and addressing a variety of rural concerns in addition to those held by urban dwellers. Furthermore, she set up a legal defense fund for farmers and challenged the leadership of drunken and illiterate chiefs who she felt were not interested in the welfare of their subjects. Ultimately she became general secretary of the RBVA. Ngano was known for organizing women's discussion groups in Bulawayo that circulated banned political pamphlets during the colonial period.

== Early life and education ==
Martha Ngano is a member of the Fingo tribe or Mfengu, and her specific birth date is not documented. The Fingo tribe was originally a community of cattle herders and farmers. However under British colonial authorities and missionary rule the Fingo people became Westernized Christians. The Fingo people were given access to missionary education and Christian institutions during the nineteenth century. She was able to participate in political debate and public life during the colonial period. Due to missionaries efforts a lot of Southern Africans engaged in politics. During the early twentieth century many political leaders came from communities that had high populations of British rule and missionary exposure. Colonial voting systems frequently required property ownership, income, literacy, which limited African participation in governance. Ngano's early environment more than likely influenced her activism later in life and her exposure to missionary institutions which emphasized education. Historians do note that colonial systems created small but influential African elites who grew to challenge the discriminatory laws using political organization and advocacy.

== Migration to Rhodesia and entry into political activism ==
In 1897 Ngano migrated from South Africa to Rhodesia. During this time the region was heavily under British colonial administration. African political participation was severely restricted and limited. Although voting rights technically existed, they were implemented in a way that excluded most Africans from political power or a political voice. The colonial system required property ownership, income qualifications, proficient literacy in English, and other classification test, which drastically limited the number of Africans that could vote. Due to the restrictions and disparities African political associations began forming in urban areas. These organizations were formed as tools of advocacy for African interest and protection within the colonial political system. Many political groups emerged during the twentieth century, including the Rhodesian Bantu Voters' Association, Matabele Home Society, Southern Rhodesia Bantu Congress, Industrial and Commercial Workers' Union, and the African National Congress. Ngano quickly became involved in these political advocacy organizations. Her education and public speaking made her an asset. She became vocal in political discussions. Advocating for increased access to true education, specifically English literacy, because literacy requirements were used to exclude Africans from voting. Her early activism put her among the first generation of African political activist who challenged colonial rule through civic engagement and organized advocacy.

== Leadership in the Rhodesian Bantu Voters' Association ==
Ngano was actively involved in the Rhodesian Bantu Voters' Association. The Rhodesian Bantu Voters' Association (RBVA) was founded in 1923, and is one of the earliest African political organizations in colonial Rhodesia. The associations focus was to represent and support the interest of Africans who qualified to vote and help those who did not. The Rhodesian Bantu Voters' Association sought to encourage Africans who had the property, income, and literacy requirements to vote. The organization also doubled as a platform for discussion and advocacy. Majority of members consisted of teachers, clerks, and small business owners who had access to education and urban employment. These individual gathered to form a group of politically involved people in the African middle class. The Rhodesian Bantu Voters' Association attempted to balance engaging in colonial rule through petitions and negotiations while also advocating for reformations of the law that would increase African political participation. With time Ngano took the role of general secretary of the organization. This role involved her organizing meetings, coordinating political activities, and communicating with members across the colony. Without her leadership the associations outreach and influence would not have been so broad among the many African communities. Although the Rhodesian Bantu Voters' Association only represented a fraction of the African population, it is considered one of the earliest examples of organized political activism in Rhodesia. The ground work the Rhodesian Bantu Voters' Association created became helpful to later nationalist movements.

== Advocacy for rural communities and women's political participation ==
One of Ngano's most significant contributions was her efforts in expanding political awareness beyond urban elites. Early African political organizations were often elitist with limited membership, consisting of educated individuals living in towns.These organizations were majority based in urban areas with small memberships numbers. Ngano strived to broaden this small base by reaching rural communities. She encourage farmers and rural residents to participate in political discussions concerning education, taxation, and representation. She helped connected urban political activism with rural political activism.

In addition to this Ngano also played an important role in politically mobilizing women. Ngano was responsible for the organization of women's discussion groups in Bulawayo. They debated colonial policies and shared political information. These gatherings allowed women to develop political awareness during a time when women were excluded from formal political institutions. The groups also distributed political pamphlets and educational material that criticized colonial laws. This was important as during the time the colonial government attempted to control the information spread among African communities. Ngano's work showed the importances of grassroots politics. By connecting urban and rural communities and by urging women's participation in political conversation, she helped expand the number of political activism in Rhodesia.

== Legacy and historical significance ==
Through her leadership in the Rhodesian Bantu Voters' Association, Martha Ngano played an important role in the development of African political activism in Southern Africa. Although these organizations had limited immediate success in changing colonial rule, Ngano helped helped create these political. spaces where people could debate, organize communities, and advocate for their rights. It is believed that these organizations represent some of the first strutted efforts by Africans in Rhodesia to challenge political rule and discriminatory colonial laws. As general secretary of the Rhodesian Bantu Voters' Association, Ngano provided platforms for educated Africans to fight voting rights. Ngano's organization and leadership cultivated political awareness in both urban and rural African communities. Her work demonstrated how grassroots organization could contribute to broader political engagement. Ngano is recognized as part of the first generation of African activists who challenged colonial rule and helped lay the foundation for later independence movements.
