= 1973 in Rhodesia =

- Decades: 1960s; 1970s
- See also: Other events of 1973; Timeline of Rhodesian history

The following lists events that happened during 1973 in Rhodesia.

== Incumbents ==
- President: Clifford Dupont
- Prime Minister: Ian Smith

== Events ==
- 9 January - Rhodesia closes its borders with Zambia due to the Zambians harbouring guerrillas.
- 4 February - Rhodesia re-opens its borders to Zambia (formerly Northern Rhodesia) but the Zambian side remained closed.
- 22 May - Britain and United States veto a United Nations Security Council Resolution to extend sanctions against Rhodesia.
- 21–25 June - A British delegation, led by Denis Greenhill visit Rhodesia for talks with the Rhodesian government and Bishop Abel Muzorewa, African National Council.
- 17 July - Ian Smith, the Rhodesian Prime Minister and Bishop Abel Muzorewa, African National Council(ANC) meet.
