= 1890s in Zimbabwe =

== Events ==
=== 1890 ===
- 6 May – The Pioneer Column left Cecil Rhodes' farm at Kenilworth, a suburb of Kimberley, for Macloutsie under Col. Pennefather and Sir John Willoughby
- 29 June – Archibald Ross Colquhoun becomes the Resident Commissioner of Mashonaland
- July – Fort Tuli is built by the Pioneer Column at the place known as Selous Camp and used by Frederick Selous as a base for his hunting expeditions.
- 13 September – The Pioneer Column ran up the Union Jack on Harare Hill in Salisbury and claimed Mashonaland for the British Empire, having arrived the previous day
- 1 October – The Pioneer Column is disbanded and each member is granted land on which to farm

=== 1891 ===
- 15 February – A temporary frontier at Manica is settled.
- 9 May – Mashonaland, Matabeleland and Bechuanaland are declared British Protectorates in London by Order in Council.
- 12 June – The United Kingdom and Portuguese governments reach agreement on the means of determining boundaries between their territories.
- 27 June – First edition of the Mashonaland Herald, later the Rhodesia Herald and later still the Zimbabwe Herald
- 18 September – Leander Starr Jameson becomes the first Administrator of Mashonaland
- 22 December – The British South Africa Company holds its first annual meeting in London.

=== 1892 ===
- 22 June – Kopje Fort is completed at Salisbury.
- 29 October – The Rhodesia Herald commences publication.

=== 1893 ===
- 18 July – Matabele impis enter Victoria and attack the Mashona
- 2 October – King Lobengula's impis attack patrols of the British South Africa company
- 3 October – War on the Matabele is authorised – First Matabele War
- 8 October – 22 January 1894 – Andrew Duncan becomes acting administrator for Leander Starr Jameson
- 4 November – British forces occupy the site of Bulawayo. This marks the effective occupation of Matabeleland by British settlers
- 3 December – British forces, in search of King Lobengula, suffer a humiliating defeat near the Shangani river. The incident becomes known as the Shangani Patrol. The remains of the 34 Patrol members killed on that day were eventually interred next to the bodies of Cecil Rhodes and Leander Starr Jameson at World's View in the Matobo Hills. The American scout, Frederick Russell Burnham, is one of only three survivors of the Patrol.

=== 1894 ===
- Spring – Matabele King Lobengula dies of unknown causes. His death is kept a secret from the British for many months.
- 23 January – Mashonaland and Matabeleland protectorates merge to form South Zambesia
  - Andrew Duncan is made the acting Chief magistrate of South Zambesia
- May – Leander Starr Jameson is elected Chief magistrate of South Zambesia
- 9 September – Leander Jameson becomes the Administrator of the South Zambesia Protectorate
- 28 October – 1 April 1895 – Francis Rhodes stands in for Leander Jameson as acting Administrator of the South Zambesia Protectorate

=== 1895 ===
- 3 May – South Zambesia and North Zambesia are united as Rhodesia (after Cecil Rhodes)
- June – Joseph Vintcent becomes acting Administrator of the Rhodesia Protectorate
- 29 December – The Jameson raid is commenced.

=== 1896 ===
- 2 January – Leander Starr Jameson and his raiders surrender
- 20 March – The First Chimurenga revolt against the British South Africa Company starts among the Matabele
- 2 May – Albert Grey, 4th Earl Grey becomes the second Administrator of Mashonaland and Administrator of the Rhodesia Protectorate
- 14 June – The Mashona join in the First Chimurenga.
- 13 October – The Matabele are defeated by the British South Africa Company, and their chiefs concede
- November – Arthur Lawley becomes the Administrator of Matabeleland
- 29 November – British forces leave Rhodesia as it is believed local troops can now defeat the Mashona

=== 1897 ===
- January – Final determination of the boundary between Rhodesia and Portuguese possessions to the east
- 24 July – William Henry Milton becomes the 3rd Administrator of Mashonaland and Administrator of the Rhodesia Protectorate
- 26 October – The municipalities of Salisbury and Bulawayo are formally created.
- 27 October – The Mashona are defeated by the British South Africa Company thus ending the First Chimurenga.

=== 1898 ===
- Rhodesia south of the Zambezi is renamed the Colony of Southern Rhodesia

=== 1899 ===
- An Order in Council grants Southern Rhodesia a part-elected Legislative council.
- 17 April: Polling day in the first Legislative Council election.
- 15 May: First session of the Legislative Council.

== Births ==
- 1893 – John Noble Kennedy, Governor of Southern Rhodesia from January 1947 to November 1953
- 6 February 1893 John Jestyn Llewellin, 1st Baron Llewellin, Governor-general of the Federation of Rhodesia and Nyasaland from September 1953 to January 1957
- 1897 – Henry Bredon Everard, three times acting President of the Republic of Rhodesia
- 1898 – Peveril William-Powlett, Governor of Southern Rhodesia from November 1954 to December 1959
- 1899 – Robert Clarkson Tredgold, acting Governor of Southern Rhodesia from November 1953 to November 1954 and acting Governor-general of the Federation of Rhodesia and Nyasaland from January to February 1957

== Deaths ==
- 1894 – Lobengula Kumalo dies
- 1898 – Nehanda and Kaguvi, two spirit mediums are hanged

== See also ==
- 1880s in Zimbabwe
- 1900 in Zimbabwe
- Years in Zimbabwe
