= 1970 in Rhodesia =

- Decades: 1960s; 1970s
- See also: Other events of 1970; Timeline of Rhodesian history

The following lists events that happened during 1970 in the self-declared Republic of Rhodesia.

== Incumbents ==
- President: Clifford Dupont (from 2 March 1970)
- Prime Minister: Ian Smith

== Events ==
=== February ===
- 17 February - Decimal Day in Rhodesia - the Rhodesian dollar is introduced to replace the Rhodesian pound.

=== March ===
- 2 March - Rhodesia becomes a self-declared republic, but it is not recognized by the international community. Rhodesia remains legally a British colony in international law.
- 17 March - Britain and United States use their veto rights in the United Nations Security Council to avoid implementation of complete mandatory sanctions on Rhodesia.

=== May ===
- 21 May - Ian Smith, Prime Minister of Rhodesia and John Vorster, Prime Minister of South Africa hold private talks.

== Births ==
- January 24 — Neil Johnson, cricketer
- March 15 — Crispen Mutakanyi, middle distance runner
