= 1924 in Southern Rhodesia =

- Decades: 1900s; 1910s; 1920s; 1930s; 1940s
- See also: Other events of 1924; Timeline of Southern Rhodesian history

The following lists events that happened during 1924 in the colony of Southern Rhodesia.

== Incumbents ==
- Prime Minister: Charles Coghlan

== Events ==
=== April ===
- 29 April – The Southern Rhodesia general election takes place, the first election to elect members of the new Legislative Assembly. Rhodesia Party won 26 out of 30 seats.
