= 1974 in Rhodesia =

- Decades: 1960s; 1970s
- See also: Other events of 1974; Timeline of Rhodesian history

The following lists events that happened during 1974 in Rhodesia.

== Incumbents ==
- President: Clifford Dupont
- Prime Minister: Ian Smith

== Events ==
=== March ===
- 2 March - At the African National Council inaugural conference, an agreement was reached on a mandate for continuing talks with the Rhodesian regime

=== June ===
- 2 June - The African National Council rejected the proposals agreed upon between Bishop Abel Muzorewa and Ian Smith

=== July ===
- 3 July - An African National Council delegation told the British Government that they were not prepared to continue talks with the Rhodesian regime
- 30 July - The Rhodesian Front won the Rhodesia general election

=== November ===
- Detained activists Joshua Nkomo, Zimbabwe African People's Union and Ndabaningi Sithole, founder Zimbabwe African National Union were allowed to attend the meetings in Lusaka, Zambia with the presidents of Botswana, Tanzania, Zambia, African National Council and the representatives of the Rhodesian government

=== December ===
- 9 December - The Lusaka Declaration was signed uniting Zimbabwe African People's Union, Zimbabwe African National Union and African National Council under the United African National Council banner
- 11 December - A ceasefire was agreed

== Births ==
- January 1 — Birth of Samukeliso Moyo, long-distance runner
- March 16 — Birth of Heath Streak, cricketer (died 2023)
