= 1850s in Zimbabwe =

== Births ==
- 28 November 1851 - Albert Grey, 4th Earl Grey, administrator, is born at St James's Palace.
- 1852 - Philip Lyttleton Gell, 3rd Chairman of British South Africa Company
- 9 February 1853 - Leander Starr Jameson, statesman, is born at Stranraer, Scotland
- 3 December 1854 - William Henry Milton, sportsman and statesman, is born at Little Marlow, Buckinghamshire, England

== See also ==
- 1840s in Zimbabwe
- other events of 1850s
- Years in Zimbabwe
