= 1959 in Southern Rhodesia =

- Decades: 1930s; 1940s; 1950s; 1960s
- See also: Other events of 1959; Timeline of Southern Rhodesian history

The following lists events that happened during 1959 in the Colony of Southern Rhodesia.

== Incumbents ==
- Prime Minister: Humphrey Gibbs (starting 28 December)

== Events ==
- Kariba Dam's 128 m (420 ft) high and 579 m (1900 ft) long concrete wall is finished.

== Births ==
- Berenice Josephine Bickle, artist, is born Bulawayo
- 4 June - Russell Tiffin, international cricket umpire, is born in Salisbury
- 7 August - Ali Shah, all-rounder cricketer, is born in Salisbury
