= 1930 in Southern Rhodesia =

- Decades: 1910s; 1920s; 1930s; 1940s; 1950s
- See also: Other events of 1930; Timeline of Southern Rhodesian history

The following lists events that happened during 1930 in Southern Rhodesia.

== Incumbents ==
- Prime Minister: Howard Moffat

== Events ==
- The Land Apportionment Act is passed and divides Southern Rhodesia into African and European areas

== Births ==
- August 18 – John Manyarara, High Court judge (dies 2010)
