= 1971 in Rhodesia =

- Decades: 1960s; 1970s
- See also: Other events of 1971; Timeline of Rhodesian history

The following lists events that happened during 1971 in Rhodesia.

== Incumbents ==
- President: Clifford Dupont
- Prime Minister: Ian Smith

== Events ==
=== June ===
- 30 June - Arnold Goodman, a British special envoy arrived in Rhodesia for talks with the Rhodesian government

=== November ===
- 15 November - Alec Douglas-Home, the British Foreign Secretary, arrived in Salisbury to discuss settlement proposals.
- 24 November - Ian Smith, Rhodesian Prime Minister, and Alec Douglas-Home signed an agreement setting out proposals for settlement.

=== December ===
- 16 December - The African National Council is set up as a temporary non-political body under Bishop Abel Muzorewa to oppose the settlement terms.

== Births ==
- May 24 — Birth of Cephas Matafi, a long-distance runner
