= COVID-19 vaccination in Zimbabwe =

Plan to immunize against COVID-19

- Date: 22 February 2021–present
- Location: Zimbabwe
- Cause: COVID-19 pandemic
- Organised by: Ministry of Health and Child Care (Zimbabwe)
- Participants: 7,525,882 (total vaccinated); 5,662,119 (fully vaccinated); 13,935,112 (doses administered)
- Outcome: 41.5% of the Zimbabwean population received at least one dose 30.2% of the Zimbabwean population fully vaccinated
- As of 11 June 2022

On 22 February 2021, Zimbabwe launched their national COVID-19 vaccination program using the Sinopharm BIBP vaccine. As of 17 June 2022, 6,260,228 people have received their first dose, 4,598,703 have received their second dose, and 851,874 have received a third dose.

Corruption is alleged to exist within the public vaccination program, with priority for receiving vaccines being given to those willing to pay bribes to hospital staff, and members of Zimbabwe's ruling party ZANU-PF. Vaccines are reportedly available within the private health care system at a cost of approximately US$40.

== Vaccine in order ==
Vaccine	Approval	Deployment
Sinopharm BIBP	Yes	Yes
Covaxin	Yes	No
Sinovac	Yes	No
Sputnik V	Yes	No

== History ==
=== Timeline ===
On 14 February 2021, the first 200,000 doses of the Sinopharm BIBP vaccine landed at Harare's Robert Mugabe International Airport.

On 22 February 2021 Zimbabwe began its vaccination program.

On 25 February the number of people vaccinated surpassed 10,000 people.

In mid-June 2021, Alrosa Zim donated 25,000 doses of the Sputnik V COVID-19 vaccine to Zimbabwe, followed by 25,000 more doses a month later.

On 8 July 2021, Zimbabwe received 2 million doses of the Sinovac vaccine.

In December 2021, a booster vaccination programme was launched for those already double vaccinated.

On 20 December 2021, Zimbabwe received one million doses of the Sinovac vaccine donated by China.

== Progress ==
By the end of March 2021, 85,866 vaccine doses had been administered; 433,939 by the end of April; one million by the end of May; 1.3 million by the end of June; 2.3 million by the end of July; 3.8 million by the end of August; 5.2 million by the end of September; 5.8 million by the end of October; 6.4 million by the end of November; 7.2 million by the end of December 2021; 7.8 million by the end of January 2022; 7.9 million by the end of February 2022; 9.4 million by the end of March 2022; 10.3 million by the end of April 2022.

There were 0.8 million fully vaccinated by the end of July 2021; 1.6 million by the end of August; 2.3 million by the end of September 2021; 2.5 million by the end of October 2021; 2.8 million by the end of November 2021; 3.1 million by the end of December 2021; 3.3 million by the end of January 2022; 3.4 million by the end of February 2022; 3.5 million by the end of March 2022; 3.7 million by the end of April 2022.

Cumulative COVID-19 vaccine doses administered in Zimbabwe
1st dose
2nd dose
3rd dose
Daily doses administered in Zimbabwe
1st dose
2nd dose
3rd dose
