= Kadungure Mapondera =

Shona chief

- Born: 1830s Nyota Hills, Mazowe, Zimbabwe
- Died: 1904; Harare
- Other names: Chief Mapondera; General Kadungure Mapondera

Chief Kadungure Mapondera helped to lead the Shona people of Southern Africa against the British South Africa Company (BSAC) in the 1890s. He missed the Chimurenga uprising against the BSAC as he had taken his people to Mozambique in 1894 to avoid the hut tax. He returned to Rhodesia in 1900 and formed an army from the Korekore, Tavara, Mangwende, Makoni and other peoples. With allies from the Mutapa, Chioco and Mwari he waged a guerilla war against European settlers and their allied peoples in northern Mashonalan until June 1902 when he returned to Mozambique to assist the Barwe in rebellion against the Portuguese. Defeated, he returned to Rhodesia and, on 30 August 1903, surrendered to the BSAC. He was sentenced to seven years imprisonment with hard labour for murder and sedition and died in prison during a hunger strike.

Son of Nyahunzvi and his wife Mwera, Nyahunzvi son of Zhengeni, Zhenjeni son of Chiwodza (Chiwodzamamera) who became first Chief Negomo. Chiwodza was son of Mugumu (Kanogumura), a descendant of the Rozvi Dynasty of Zimbabwe from early 1690s, and his wife Chimoyo, sister of Gwangwadza and children of Chiumbe of Nehoreka dynasty. Mugumu's brother was Kuredzamuswe. The two came from Bikita and were of Moyondizvo totem.

== 1901 Mapondera Rebellion ==
As an outstanding commander and politician, in 1901 Chief Kadungure Mapondera, who had in 1894 proclaimed his independence of the British South Africa Company's rule, led a rebellion in the Guruve, Mazowe and Mount Darwin areas of Mashonaland Central. He led a force of initially under 100 men, but had over 600 under his command by mid-1901. He was captured in 1903 and died in jail in 1904 after a hunger strike.

When the Rozvi Empire was folding the children of Dhewa Basvi moved northwards from Bikita into some parts of Manicaland, Midlands, Masvingo and all Mashonaland Provinces. Some of them include Chiduku, Tandi, Ruzane, Samuriwo, Negomo, Nyamweda, Sai (Gokwe), Gumunyu, Musarurwa, Mumbengegwi, Gono (descendants of Kuredzamuswe in Shamva).

Negomo Chieftainship: Chiwodza had 3 sons viz: Mutasa (Mutopore)and Zhenjeni (from senior wife), and Muroro from junior wife. Mutasa did not leave a son. The chieftainship continues to rotate between the descendants of Zhenjeni and Muroro. Kindly note that the chieftainship does not necessarily follow seniority positions in the family.

Negomo Chieftainship: Chief 1: Chiwodzamamera. Chief 2: Zhenjeni. Chief 3: Chimukwende/Hwende/Dandera (Muroro). Chief 4: Muguse (Zhenjeni). Chief 5: Gorejena (Muroro). N.B. Muguse did not have sons. When he fell ill his brother Nyahunzvi became the longest acting chief for over 30 years. Nyahunzvi died before Muguse who had been ill for a long time. Soon after Nyahunzvi's death it did not take long before Muguse's death. Mwera the wife of Nyahunzvi, who was pregnant was inherited by the incoming chief Gorejena, son of Hwende of Muroro lineage. Mwera bore Kadungure/Chivaura who was then nicknamed Mapondera. In fact Gorejena who took Mwera as his wife soon after the death of Nyahunzvi was Mapondera's cousin. With Mwera Gorejena's children are Chikuva (daughter) and Zoraunye (son). Chief 6: Chipiro /Mukungurutse (Zhenjeni). Chief 7: Munyepere /Mutengwa (Muroro). Chief 8: Chipiro /Mhako Dingo (Zhenjeni). Chief 9: Mupfunya (Muroro). Chief 10: Chipiro /Gomwe Naison (Zhenjeni). Chief 11: Chitsinde/ Inge/ Zhakata (Muroro). Chief 12: incoming Nyahunzvi/Mapondera's family (Zhenjeni).

Paramount Chief Mapondera's chieftainship has nothing to do with Negomo chieftainship. These are different chieftainships. However Mapondera's children are also legible to Negomo chieftainship.

Mapondera's sons who left descendants were as follows (starting with most senior): 1. Chivarange/Kanotumika 2. Chaichimwe 3. Gatsi 4. Jaji/Gorejena 5. Muchenje/Chikuku 6. Kaseke/Chatamabara 7. Mukambi/Masocha 8. Chigon'a 9. Mutata 10. Jani/Mbocho 11. Macharika (no children) 12. Machiridza/Jeke 13. Murungweni/Marufu 14. Makuvise 15. Muteveri (Ben) 16. Usaihwevhu/Bainosi 17. Chibaya 18. Magwasha/Enock 19. Nhova 20. Tavengwa 21. Takawira 22. Chandidzora/Mereki.
