= Hatsi =

Hatsi Հացի
- Çörəkli
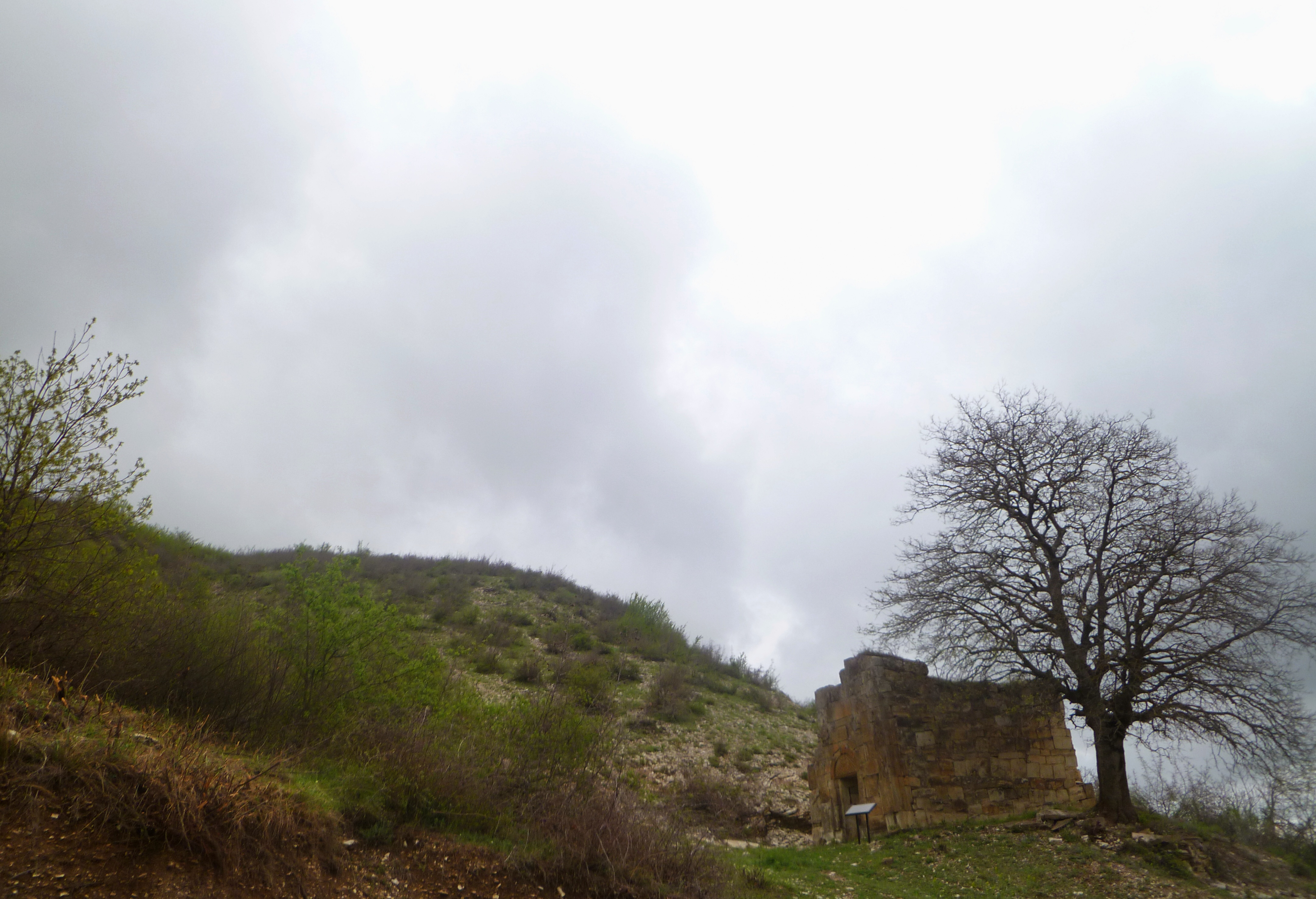
- Bri Yeghtsi monastic complex near Hatsi

- Location within Azerbaijan
- Coordinates: 39°50′41″N 46°57′27″E
- Country: Azerbaijan
  - District: Khojavend

Population (2015)
  - Total: 234
- Time zone: UTC+4 (AZT)

Hatsi (Armenian: Հացի, also Gatsi) or Chorakli (Azerbaijani: Çörəkli) is a village located in the Khojavend District of Azerbaijan, in the region of Nagorno-Karabakh. Until 2023 it was controlled by the breakaway Republic of Artsakh. The village had an ethnic Armenian-majority population until the expulsion of the Armenian population of Nagorno-Karabakh by Azerbaijan following the 2023 Azerbaijani offensive in Nagorno-Karabakh.

== History ==
During the Soviet period, the village was a part of the Martuni District of the Nagorno-Karabakh Autonomous Oblast.

== Historical heritage sites ==
Historical heritage sites in and around the village include the monastery complex of Bri Yeghtsi (Armenian: Բռի եղցի) from between the 7th and 17th centuries, and a 13th-century mural khachkar.

== Economy and culture ==
The population is mainly engaged in agriculture and animal husbandry. As of 2015, the village has a municipal building, a house of culture, a school, and a medical centre.

== Demographics ==
The village had 234 inhabitants in 2005, and 234 inhabitants in 2015.

== Gallery ==
Bri Yeghtsi monastic complex near Hatsi

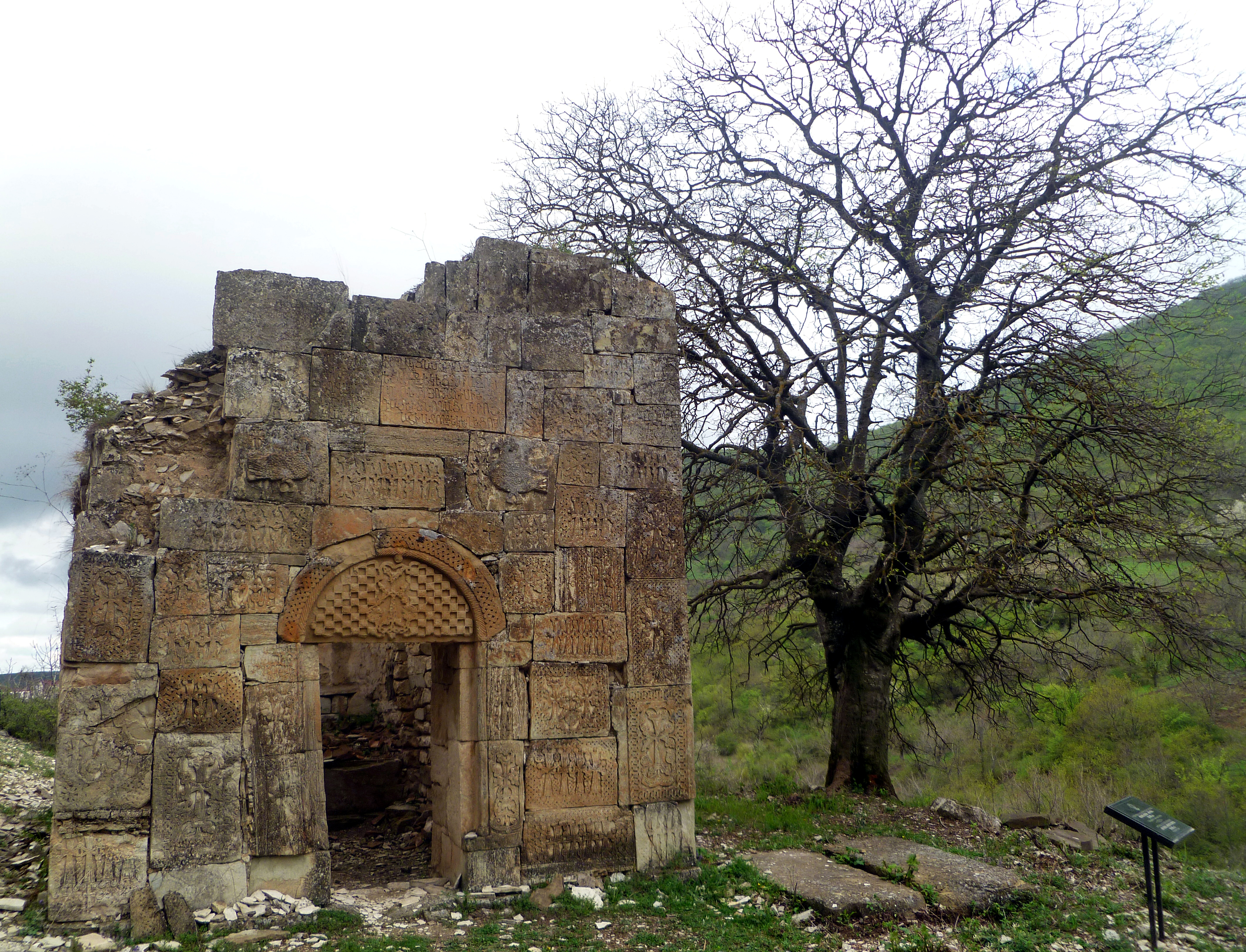

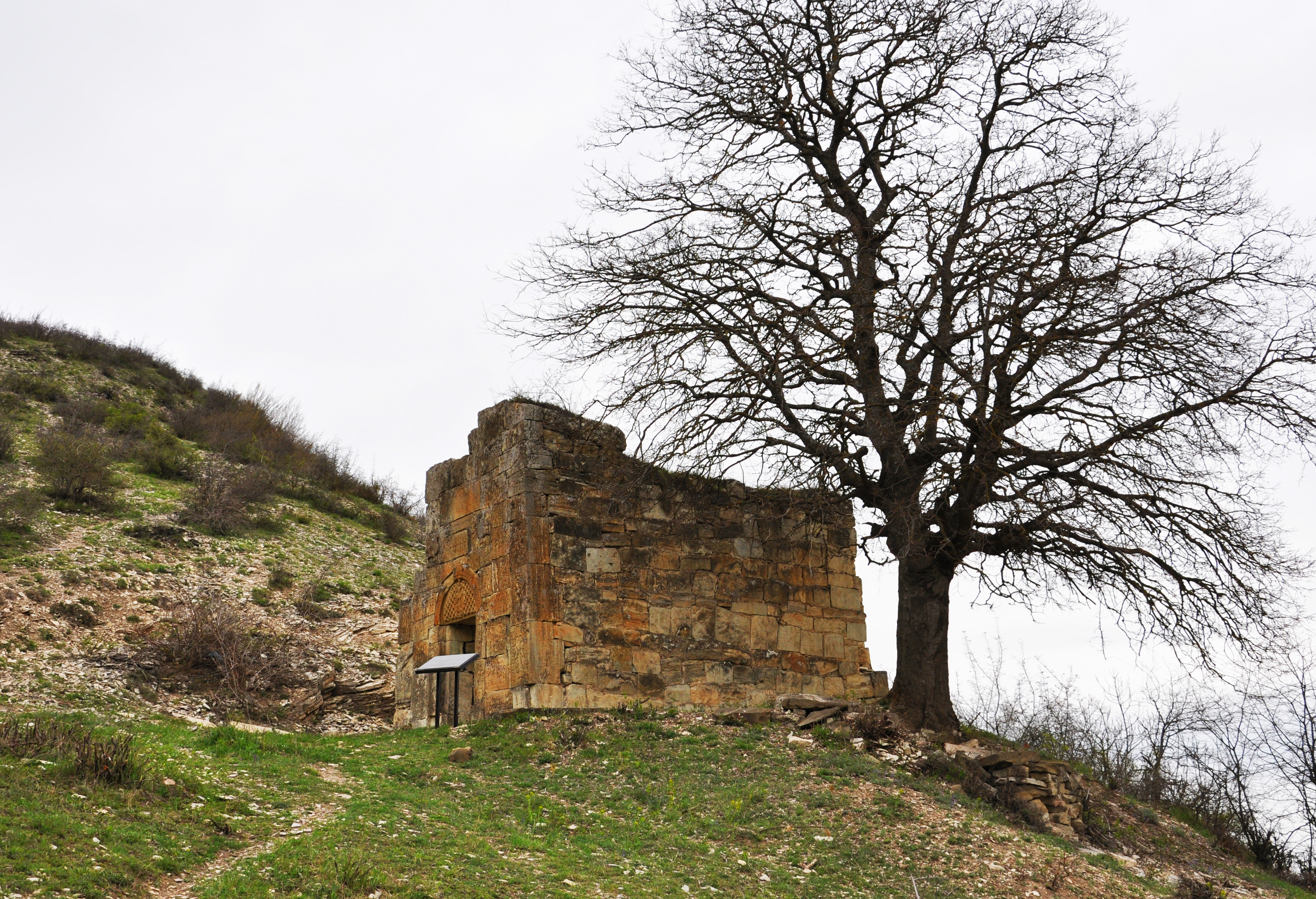

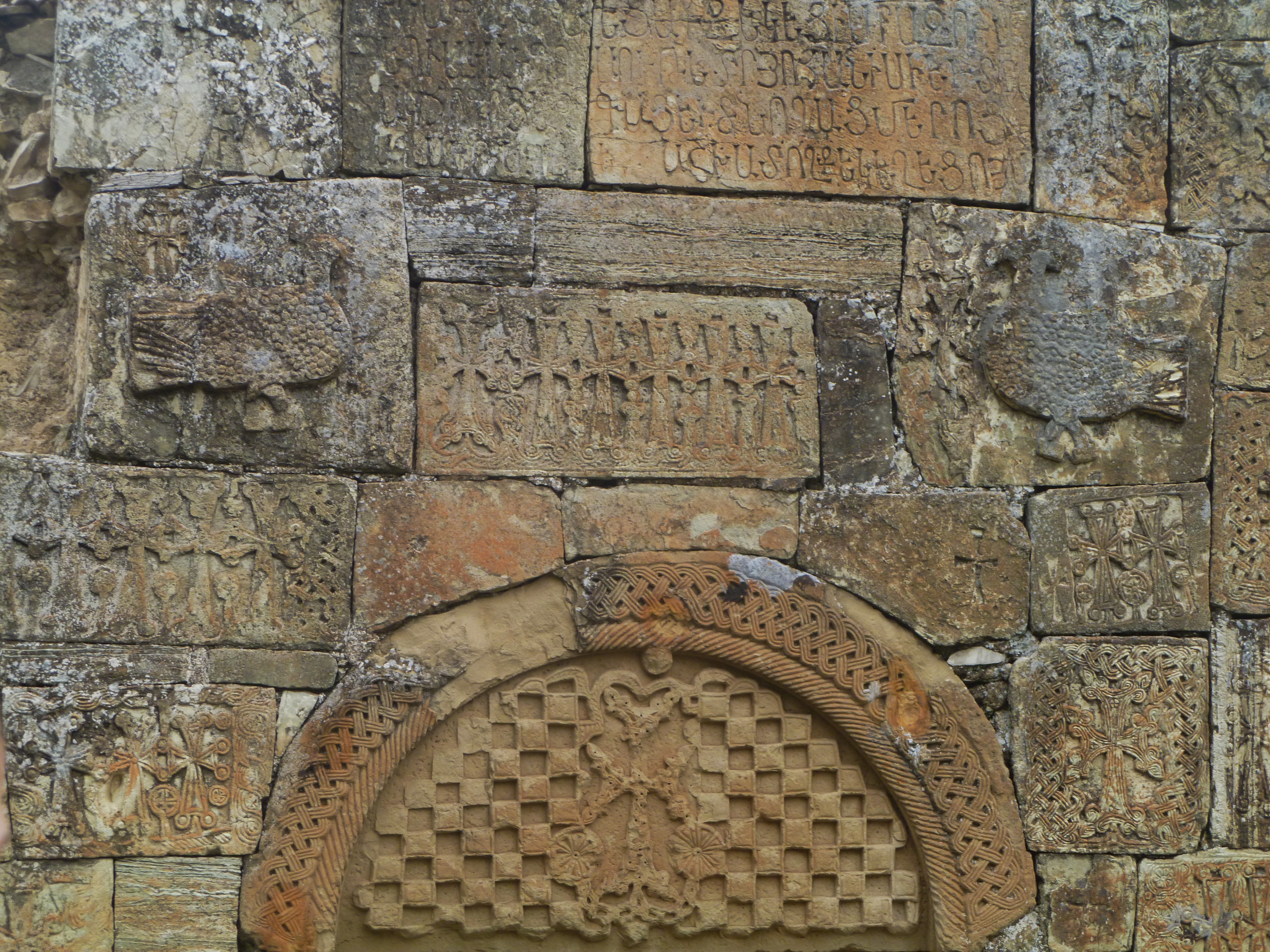
