= Patriotic Bill =

Zimbabwe law

Parliament of Zimbabwe
- Long title: Criminal Law (Codification and Reform) Amendment Bill 2022
- Territorial extent: Zimbabwe
- Commenced: 31 May 2023
- Status: In force

The Criminal Law (Codification and Reform) Amendment Bill 2022, commonly known as the Patriotic Bill is a Zimbabwean law that criminalises damaging the national interest of the country or critique of the Government of Zimbabwe.

The bill became law on May 31, 2023. The ruling ZANU-PF government said that the law is modelled around the United States' Logan Act. Legal scholars criticised the law for being "ambiguously worded, complicated, and difficult to understand." Opposition party Citizens Coalition for Change stated that the law's introduction signalled "a full-blown dictatorship run by a regime worse than Robert Mugabe".

Consequences for breaking the law include removal of citizenship and death.
