= 1976 in Rhodesia =

- Decades: 1960s; 1970s
- See also: Other events of 1976; Timeline of Rhodesian history

The following lists events that happened during 1976 in Rhodesia.

== Incumbents ==
- President: John Wrathall (starting 31 December)
- Prime Minister: Ian Smith

== Events ==
=== June ===
- 23–24 June – B.J. Vorster, Prime Minister of South Africa and Henry Kissinger, United States Secretary of State, held talks in West Germany over the Rhodesian issue.

=== August ===
- 8 August - Operation Eland, a.k.a. the Nyadzonya Raid, was launched into Mozambique by the Selous Scouts
- 11 August - Umtali came under rocket attack and mortar attack from Mozambique in retaliation for Operation Eland. Houses were damaged in Greenside and Darlington.

=== September ===
- 24 September - The Rhodesian Government accepted proposals put forward by U.S. Secretary of State, Dr. Henry Kissinger for majority rule in Rhodesia within two years.

=== November ===
- 15 November - 31 guerillas were killed by Rhodesian Security Forces in a battle in the Honde Valley

=== December ===
- 6 December - A retired Catholic bishop, a Catholic priest and a Catholic nun were shot dead in a guerrilla ambush in Lupane. They were 71-year-old retired Bishop of Bulawayo, Rt. Rev. Adolph Schmitt, 65-year-old Fr Possenti Weggarten, principal of Regina Mundi Secondary School in Lupane, and Sr Maria Frances van den Berg.
- 19 December - 27 male workers were killed by guerillas at a tea estate in the Honde Valley.

=== Unknown ===
- Robert Mugabe and Joshua Nkomo formed the Patriotic Front

== Births ==
- 3 July 1976 - Bobby Skinstad - the former South Africa National Rugby Team captain was born.

== Deaths ==
- 6 December - Retired Catholic bishop of Bulawayo, Rt. Rev. Adolph Gregory Schmitt, aged 71 was shot by guerillas in Lupane

== Bibliography ==
- (1978). "The Valiant Years." Galaxie Press, Salisbury, Rhodesia
