= 1977 in Rhodesia =

- Decades: 1960s; 1970s
- See also: Other events of 1977; Timeline of Rhodesian history

The following lists events that happened during 1977 in Rhodesia.

== Incumbents ==
- President: John Wrathall
- Prime Minister: Ian Smith

== Events ==
=== February ===
- 6 February – Seven white Catholic missionaries were killed by guerrillas at St. Paul's Mission, Musami.
- 24 February – Catholic Bishop of Umtali Donal Lamont had a 10-year prison sentence reduced to 4 by the Appeal Court in Salisbury. 3 of the 4 years were suspended. He was convicted in 1976 of failing to report the presence of terrorists

=== April ===
- 23 April – Robert Mugabe, Zimbabwe African National Union (ZANU) leader announced that ZANU and Zimbabwe African People's Union (ZAPU) would merge as the Zimbabwe African National Union - Patriotic Front

=== August ===
- 6 August – The Salisbury Woolworths bombing. A 30 kg bomb exploded in a Woolworths store in Salisbury killing 11 people and wounding 76. The victims were black, white and coloured. The store on the corner of Pioneer Street, and Bank Street was also badly damaged.

=== November ===
- 23–25 November – 3,000 ZANLA guerrillas were killed in raids by Rhodesian Security Forces on camps in Mozambique. These raids had its code named Operation Dingo, also known as the Chimoio Raids and the Chimoio massacre.

== Deaths ==
- 9 August – Johanna Decker, a missionary was killed by guerillas.
