= Elvis Nyathi =

Zimbabwean man murdered in South Africa (1979–2022)

Elvis Nyathi also known as Mbodazwe Banajo (14 February 1979 - 7 April 2022) was a Zimbabwean economic refugee who resided in Diepsloot, north of Johannesburg in South Africa.

== Background ==
Nyathi was killed in the Xenophobia in South Africa attacks. He was beaten and burnt alive by a mob of demonstrators in Diepsloot, Johannesburg on 6 April 2022. Nyathi was assaulted and burnt in April when some residents from Diepsloot, north of Johannesburg went on a rampage accusing Zimbabwean nationals of being behind crime in the area. His ashes were buried in Bulawayo, Zimbabwe in a state assisted funeral. Elvis Nyathi's brother is called Godknows Nyathi. His wife is called Nomsa Tshuma.

== Escalation of demonstrations to mob action ==
The protests escalated to mob action with community members roving the township demanding to see residents' passports to determine their nationality. "Community members were doing door-to-door [checks]. Then when they got to a yard, a guy jumped out of his shack and ran. According to SABC TV, the individual Moalosi was referring to, was identified as Zimbabwean national Elvis Nyathi. His wife Nomsa Tshuma, told reporters that "many people" entered the yard of the family's home demanding to see their passports. "They said 'why are we hiding, it means we have a gun'. That's why they took him. I told them there was no gun and told them to search," Tshuma said. Nyathi was allegedly stoned and burnt to death

== How the case was solved ==
Seven men were identified behind killing Elvis Nyathi and they were arrested by the Johannesburg SAPS. The seven men face charges of murder, attempted murder, kidnapping, robbery with aggravating circumstances, assault with intent to do grievous bodily harm, and extortion. Their case of murdering Zimbabwean national Elvis Nyathi was reported to the Randburg Magistrate's Court in Johannesburg.
