= Stephen Lungu =

African evangelist (1942–2021)

Stephen Lungu (1942 – 18 January 2021) was a Zimbabwean evangelist known as the "Billy Graham of Africa."

== Biography ==
Born in Harare to a Nyasaland father and Northern Rhodesian mother, Lungu was raised in Southern Rhodesia. Abandoned at the age of 7, he lived on the streets of Harare and joined street gangs. As a teenager, when Lungu was about to throw petrol bombs at an evangelistic tent, he heard the preaching and converted to Christianity. He was mentored by the British missionary Patrick Johnstone and worked for Dorothea Mission and, from the early-1980s, for African Enterprise, serving as its team leader for Malawi until 2007. He became known for his preaching throughout Africa, and was described as the "Billy Graham of Africa."

Lungu died on 18 January 2021, in Malawi, from complications related to COVID-19 during the COVID-19 pandemic in Malawi.

== Works ==
- Lungu, Stephen (2001). Out of the Black Shadows. Lion Hudson PLC. ISBN 978-1-85424-554-0.
