= Salisbury Woolworths bombing =

1977 bombing of a department store in Rhodesia

- Part of the Rhodesian Bush War
- Location: 17°50′9.3″S 31°2′26.8″E: Salisbury, Rhodesia; (today Harare, Zimbabwe)
- Date: 6 August 1977; Shortly before 12:00 (Central Africa Time)
- Attack type: Bombing
- Deaths: 11
- Injuries: 76
- Perpetrator: Zimbabwe African National Liberation Army (ZANLA)

On 6 August 1977, during the Rhodesian Bush War, a Woolworths store in Salisbury, Rhodesia (today Harare, Zimbabwe) was bombed by nationalist forces. Eleven civilians were killed and 76 were injured. Of those killed, eight were black Rhodesians, including two pregnant women and a young boy, and three were whites, members of a single family, Gillian and Donald Mayor and their mother. Mr Mayor and another daughter, Wendy, were seated in a car outside when the bomb went off.

The bomb, comprising about 75 pounds (34 kg) of high explosives, was planted in an area where customers checked packages in before shopping on the upper floor of the two-storey building. It detonated shortly before the crowded store was to close at noon that Saturday. The perpetrators, two teachers, afterwards escaped to Mozambique.

Ian Smith, the Rhodesian Prime Minister, expressed horror at the bombing. "Those who have perpetrated this barbarous outrage can hardly be described as human," he said. Rhodesian black nationalist leaders Bishop Abel Muzorewa and the Reverend Ndabaningi Sithole also condemned the attack.
