= COVID-19 pandemic in Zimbabwe =

Ongoing COVID-19 viral pandemic in Zimbabwe

- Disease: COVID-19
- Pathogen: SARS-CoV-2
- Location: Zimbabwe
- Index case: Victoria Falls
- Arrival date: 20 March 2020 (6 years, 7 months, 1 week and 1 day)
- Confirmed cases: 266,436
- Active cases: 1,841
- Recovered: 247,379
- Deaths: 5,740
- Fatality rate: 2.15%
- Vaccinations: 7,525,882 (total vaccinated); 5,662,119 (fully vaccinated); 13,935,112 (doses administered)

The COVID-19 pandemic in Zimbabwe is part of the worldwide pandemic of coronavirus disease 2019 (COVID-19) caused by severe acute respiratory syndrome coronavirus 2 (SARS-CoV-2).The COVID-19 pandemic was confirmed to have reached Zimbabwe in March 2020. Some of Zimbabwe's provinces, especially Manicaland, Masvingo and Mashonaland East, also struggled with a malaria outbreak at the same time. Though malaria is treatable, the healthcare system faces drug shortages and increased strain with the spread of COVID-19.

== Background ==
On 12 January 2020, the World Health Organization (WHO) confirmed that a novel coronavirus was the cause of a respiratory illness in a cluster of people in Wuhan, Hubei, China, which was reported to the WHO on 31 December 2019.

The case fatality ratio for COVID-19 has been much lower than SARS of 2003, but the transmission has been significantly greater, with a significant total death toll. Model-based simulations for Zimbabwe indicate that the 95% confidence interval for the time-varying reproduction number R_{t} has been stable below 1.0 since June 2021.

== Timeline ==
=== March 2020 ===
- On 20 March, Zimbabwe reported its first COVID-19 case: a male resident of Victoria Falls who travelled back from the UK via South Africa on 15 March. No deaths have been reported initially, as erroneously indicated in some sources since the patient continues with self-isolation at home and showing signs of recovery.
- Two more cases in the country were confirmed on 21 March, both in Harare. On the 23 March, it was confirmed that noted Zimbabwean journalist Zororo Makamba was the first person in the country to die from the virus.
- During March, 8 persons tested positive and one died, leaving 7 active cases at the end of the month.

=== April to June 2020 ===
- After Zororo Makamba's death, two more people died, increasing the number of deaths to three. Due to a shortage of protective medical equipment Zimbabwean doctors filed a lawsuit against the government so that they are adequately protected when treating infected patients. On 13 April, three more cases were reported, resulting in the number of cases in the country to total to 17.
- At least five journalists have been arrested for their coverage of the COVID-19 pandemic.
- During April, 26 persons tested positive and three died. The number of confirmed cases since the start of the outbreak reached 34. The number of active cases at the end of the month was 25 (an increase by 257% from March).
- In April, according to Statutory Instrument 96 of 2020 of the Presidential Powers Act deferral of property rentals and mortgage payments during National Lockdown occurred.
- During the month 144 persons tested positive. The number of confirmed cases since the start of the outbreak reached 178. The number of active cases at the end of the month was 145 (an increase by 480% from April). The number of deceased patients remained unchanged.
- On 12 June, the India national cricket team announced that it was calling off its tour of Zimbabwe, scheduled for August 2020.
- Health minister, Obadiah Moyo, was arrested over US$4 million scandal alongside the president's son, Collins Mnangagwa, that involved improper procurement of personal protection equipment (PPE) for medical workers.
- During June 413 persons tested positive, bringing the total number of confirmed cases since the start of the outbreak to 591. The death toll rose to 7. By the end of the month there were 422 active cases, an increase by 191% from the end of May.

=== July to September 2020 ===
- Police reported that 105,000 had been arrested for violating health measures since March, including 1,000 arrests for not wearing facemasks on July 18 and 19.
- On 21 July, Zimbabwe announced a stringent daily curfew, with only essential services allowed to operate between 8am and 3pm. The government was accused of using the pandemic as cover to crack down on planned protests over corruption.
- As of 28 July 2020, the country reported 2,817 cases and 40 deaths an increase of 113 from 1169 PCR tests and 255 Rapid Diagnostic tests on that date. The cumulative number of tests was 124,194 tests of which 68,194 were Rapid Diagnostic Tests. It is not disclosed if these Rapid Diagnostic Tests (RDT) are antigen or antibody tests. There were 2,578 new cases in July, raising the total number of confirmed cases since the start of the outbreak to 3,169. The death toll rose to 67. The number of recovered patients reached 1004, leaving 2,098 active cases at the end of the month.
- On 29 July, Minister of Lands, Agriculture and Rural Resettlement Perrance Shiri died from COVID-19, days after his driver also died from the illness.
- The beginning of August saw a rapid increase in confirmed cases, with deaths attributed to COVID-19 doubling from 40 to 80 between 28 July and 3 August.
- On 3 August, five Zimbabwe Revenue Authority officials from the Beitbridge border crossing with South Africa tested positive, resulting in the Ministry of Health and Child Care embarking on a mass testing exercise and sterilisation of the facility.
- On 4 August, President Emmerson Mnangagwa's son Tongai tested positive for COVID-19.
- The number of confirmed cases more than doubled in August, to 6,497. The death toll more than tripled to 202. At the end of August there were 1,074 active cases.
- On 15 September, Movement for Democratic Change – Tsvangirai leader Elias Mudzuri tested positive for COVID-19. There were 1,340 new cases in September, bringing the total number of confirmed cases to 7,837. The death toll rose to 228. The number of recovered patients increased to 6,122, leaving 1,487 active cases at the end of the month.

=== October to December 2020 ===
- There were 530 new cases in October, bringing the total number of confirmed cases to 8,367. The death toll rose to 243. The number of recovered patients increased to 7,894, leaving 230 active cases at the end of the month.
- Testing of all 607 pupils and staff at John Tallach High School resulted in 184 positive tests. The school was closed down and all pupils and members of staff quarantined.
- There were 1,667 new cases in November, bringing the total number of confirmed cases to 10,034. The death toll rose to 277. The number of recovered patients increased to 8,489, leaving 1,268 active cases at the end of the month.
- There were 3,591 new cases in December, raising the total number of confirmed cases to 13,625. The death toll rose to 360. The number of recovered patients increased to 11,154, leaving 2,111 active cases at the end of the month.

=== January to March 2021 ===
- On 2 January the government introduced a 30-day curfew along similar lines as in July 2020 in an effort to curb rising infection numbers.
- On 13 January traditional funerals were banned.
- There were 19,763 new cases in January, raising the total number of confirmed cases to 33,388. The death toll rose to 1,217, including a series of notable COVID-19 deaths over a period of just ten days: sculptor Lazarus Takawira on 12 January; ZANU-PF youth leader Lens 'Ruwizhi' Farando on 15 January; State Minister for Manicaland Ellen Gwaradzimba on 15 January; freedom fighter and nationalist Morton Malianga on 15 January; ZANU-PF Masvingo information secretary Ronald Ndava on 17 January; former Reserve Bank of Zimbabwe governor Kombo James Moyana on 18 January; the Minister for Foreign Affairs and International Trade Sibusiso Moyo on 20 January; the Minister for Transport and Infrastructure Development, Joel Matiza, on 22 January; former Minister for Education, Sports and Culture Aeneas Chigwedere on 22 January; former Commissioner General of the Zimbabwe Prisons and Correctional Services, Paradzai Zimondi, on 22 January.
- Three members of the Cabinet of Zimbabwe died in the first two weeks of January because of the pandemic, adding to the death of Cabinet minister Perrance Shiri in July 2020.
- The government announced that two batches of the Chinese-made Sinopharm BIBP vaccine had been ordered with the first 200,000 doses expected to arrive on 15 February and 600,000 more doses in March 2021. Mass vaccination commenced on 18 February.
- The 501.V2 variant was confirmed in Zimbabwe on 16 February.
- There were 2,701 new cases in February, raising the total number of confirmed cases to 36,089. The death toll rose to 1,463.
- There were 793 new cases in March, raising the total number of confirmed cases to 36,882. The death toll rose to 1,523. Since the start of mass vaccination on 18 February, 76,995 persons had been inoculated.

=== April to June 2021 ===
- There were 1,375 new cases in April, raising the total number of confirmed cases to 38,257. The death toll rose to 1,567. The number of recovered patients increased to 35,612, leaving 1,078 active cases at the end of the month. Since the start of mass vaccination on 18 February, 414,735 persons had been inoculated.
- Zimbabwe's first case of the B.1.617 variant was confirmed on 19 May. There were 704 new cases in May, raising the total number of confirmed cases to 38,961. The death toll rose to 1,594. The number of recovered patients increased to 36,596, leaving 771 active cases at the end of the month.
- Localised lockdown measures were introduced in Mashonaland West, Masvingo and Bulawayo as Zimbabwe entered a third wave of infections. Ahmed Bilal Shah died from COVID-19 on 25 June. There were 10,903 new cases in June, raising the total number of confirmed cases to 49,864. The death toll rose to 1,789. The number of recovered patients increased to 39,121, leaving 8,954 active cases at the end of the month.

=== July to September 2021 ===
- The number of confirmed cases more than doubled in July to 108,860, a monthly increase of 59,996. The death toll rose to 3,532. The number of recovered patients more than doubled to 78,856, leaving 29,472 active cases at the end of the month. The number of fully vaccinated persons stood at 767,910.
- In August, the number of confirmed cases increased by 15,913 to 124,773. The death toll rose to 4,419. The number of recovered patients more than doubled to 113,057, leaving 7,297 active cases at the end of the month. The number of fully vaccinated persons stood at 1,636,498.
- There were 6,047 new cases in September, bringing the total number of confirmed cases to 130,820. The death toll rose to 4,623. The number of recovered patients increased to 123,016, leaving 3,181 active cases at the end of the month. The number of fully vaccinated persons stood at 2,271,135.

=== October to December 2021 ===
- There were 2,157 new cases in October, bringing the total number of confirmed cases to 132,977. The death toll rose to 4,678. The number of recovered patients increased to 127,700, leaving 599 active cases at the end of the month.
- There were 1,648 new cases in November, bringing the total number of confirmed cases to 134,625. The death toll rose to 4,707. The number of recovered patients increased to 128,747, leaving 1,171 active cases at the end of the month. The number of fully vaccinated persons stood at 2,816,543.
- Vice-president Constantino Chiwenga claimed on 2 December that the B.1.1.529 strain had been identified in Zimbabwe.
- There were 78,733 new cases in December, bringing the total number of confirmed cases to 213,358. The death toll rose to 5,004. The number of recovered patients increased to 180,570, leaving 27,684 active cases at the end of the month. The number of fully vaccinated persons stood at 3,135,175. Modelling by WHO's Regional Office for Africa suggests that due to under-reporting, the true cumulative number of infections by the end of 2021 was around 6.8 million while the true number of COVID-19 deaths was around 6,295.

=== January to March 2022 ===
- There were 16,308 new cases in January, bringing the total number of confirmed cases to 229,666. The death toll rose to 5,338. The number of recovered patients increased to 219,414, leaving 4,914 active cases at the end of the month. The number of fully vaccinated persons stood at 3,299,628.
- There were 6,714 new cases in February, bringing the total number of confirmed cases to 236,380. The death toll rose to 5,395. The number of recovered patients increased to 226,394, leaving 4,591 active cases at the end of the month. The number of fully vaccinated persons stood at 3,393,674.
- There were 9,905 new cases in March, bringing the total number of confirmed cases to 246,285. The death toll rose to 5,444. The number of recovered patients increased to 238,276, leaving 2,565 active cases at the end of the month. The number of fully vaccinated persons stood at 3,529,646.

=== April to June 2022 ===
- There were 1,626 new cases in April, bringing the total number of confirmed cases to 247,911. The death toll rose to 5,469. The number of recovered patients increased to 241,703, leaving 740 active cases at the end of the month. The number of fully vaccinated persons stood at 3,673,894.
- There were 4,792 new cases in May, bringing the total number of confirmed cases to 252,703. The death toll rose to 5,506. The number of recovered patients increased to 244,434, leaving 2,763 active cases at the end of the month. The number of fully vaccinated persons stood at 4,522,237.
- There were 2,883 new cases in June, bringing the total number of confirmed cases to 255,586. The death toll rose to 5,555. The number of recovered patients increased to 248,664, leaving 1,367 active cases at the end of the month. The number of fully vaccinated persons stood at 4,611,113.

=== July to September 2022 ===
- There were 796 new cases in July, bringing the total number of confirmed cases to 256,382. The death toll rose to 5,577.
- There were 387 new cases in August, bringing the total number of confirmed cases to 256,769. The death toll rose to 5,596.
- There were 573 new cases in September, bringing the total number of confirmed cases to 257,342. The death toll rose to 5,599. The number of recovered patients increased to 251,233, leaving 510 active cases at the end of the month.

=== October to December 2022 ===
- There were 551 new cases in October, bringing the total number of confirmed cases to 257,893. The death toll rose to 5,606. The number of recovered patients increased to 251,904, leaving 383 active cases at the end of the month.
- There were 1271 new cases in November, bringing the total number of confirmed cases to 259,164. The death toll rose to 5,620.
- There were 783 new cases in December, bringing the total number of confirmed cases to 259,947. The death toll rose to 5,635. The number of recovered patients increased to 253,659, leaving 653 active cases at the end of the month.

=== 2023 ===
- There were 6,124 confirmed cases in 2023, bringing the total number of cases to 266,071. The death toll rose to 5,731.

== Prevention measures and effects ==
Before there were any confirmed cases in the country, President Emmerson Mnangagwa had declared a national emergency, putting in place travel restrictions and banning large gatherings. The country's defence minister, Oppah Muchinguri caused controversy by stating the coronavirus could be a divine punishment on Western nations for imposing sanctions on Zimbabwe.

On 23 March, President Mnangagwa announced additional measures:

1. Closure of Zimbabwe's borders to all non-essential travel, except for returning residents and cargo;
2. Closure of bars, nightclubs, cinemas, swimming pools, and sporting activities;
3. Restriction of all public gatherings to fewer than 50 people;
4. Restriction of hospital visits to no more than one per day.

On 27 March the government announced that the country would go into a nationwide lockdown for 21 days from 30 March onwards. The Victoria Falls viewing sites have also been closed as part of Zimbabwe and Zambia lock down measures. Some of the restrictions of the 21-Day Lock down have been reversed; supermarkets are now allowed to sell alcohol once again. On 18 April the Republic of Zimbabwe celebrate its 40th independence day under lock down for the first time in the country's history. During the lockdown 201 malaria outbreaks were reported, 90 were controlled resulting in 131 people dying.

The IMF estimated that the Zimbabwean economy would probably contract by 7.4% in 2020 largely due to the impact of the pandemic.

Prevention and treatment was negatively impacted by a medical workers strike in the first quarter of 2020 due to a lack of PPE.

== Vaccination ==
On 22 February 2021, Zimbabwe launched their COVID-19 vaccination program using the Sinopharm BIBP vaccine. As of 17 June 2022, 6,260,228 people have received their first dose, 4,598,703 have received their second dose, and 851,874 have received a third dose. As of 11 June 2022, 41.5% of the total population received at least one dose.

Corruption is alleged to exist within the public vaccination program, with the priority for receiving vaccines being given to those willing to pay bribes to hospital staff, and members of Zimbabwe's ruling party ZANU-PF. Vaccines are reportedly available within the private health care system at a cost of approximately US$40.

== See also ==
- COVID-19 pandemic in Africa
- COVID-19 pandemic by country and territory
- COVID-19 vaccination in Zimbabwe
- COVID-19 vaccination in South Africa
- 2020 in Middle Africa
- 2021 in Middle Africa
