= Blessed Geza =

Zimbabwean political figure (1943–2026)

- Born: 1943; Southern Rhodesia
- Died: 6 February 2026 (aged 82–83); South Africa
- Other name: Bombshell
- Occupations: War veteran, political activist
- Known for: Involvement in Zimbabwean politics, war veteran advocacy
- Spouse: Roseline Ndaizivei Tawengwa

Blessed Runesu Geza (1943 – 6 February 2026), commonly known as Bombshell Geza, was a Zimbabwean political figure, fugitive, war veteran, and expelled member of the Zimbabwe African National Union-Patriotic Front (ZANU-PF). Geza was expelled from the party in March 2025 after launching a public campaign against President Emmerson Mnangagwa, accusing him of corruption, treason, nepotism, and betraying the ideals of the liberation struggle. Geza was a fugitive from February 2025, facing multiple criminal charges, including terrorism and called for mass protests to demand Mnangagwa’s resignation.

== Early life and liberation struggle ==
Details about Geza’s early life, including his birth date and upbringing, are vague and poorly documented, casting doubt on the depth of his claimed revolutionary credentials. Born in rural Zimbabwe during the Rhodesian era, Geza purportedly joined the Zimbabwe African National Liberation Army (ZANLA) during the Second Chimurenga, the armed struggle against colonial rule. While he styled himself as a committed guerrilla fighter, little verifiable evidence supports his specific contributions to Zimbabwe’s independence in 1980, raising questions about the authenticity of his war veteran status. After independence in 1980, Geza transitioned into roles within Zimbabwe’s security and political spheres. Some sources suggest he served in the Central Intelligence Organisation (CIO) as a secret service officer, though this remains unverified. By the 2000s, he had aligned himself with ZANU-PF, rising to the party's Central Committee, a key decision-making body.

== Expulsion and criminal allegations ==
Geza’s accusations led to his expulsion from ZANU-PF on 6 March 2025, a decision ratified by the Politburo and announced by secretary for legal affairs Patrick Chinamasa. The party condemned his statements as divisive and treasonous, prompting a police manhunt on charges of incitement, undermining presidential authority, and vehicle theft—allegations Geza denied without substantiation. Fleeing into hiding, he continued to accuse authorities of fabricating charges against him. In February 2025, the arrest of his wife, Roseline Ndaizivei Tawengwa, was seized upon by Geza as evidence of persecution.

In March 2025, Geza issued a dramatic call for nationwide protests on 31 March, demanding Mnangagwa’s resignation based on unproven allegations of corruption involving figures like Kudakwashe Regimond Tagwirei and Wicknell Chivayo. Appearing in military attire—a move critics called a cheap stunt—he claimed backing from opposition leaders like Nelson Chamisa and Job Sikhala, though no evidence of such alliances emerged. The government swiftly quashed his plans, banning protests and exposing Geza’s lack of grassroots support. ZANU-PF loyalists, including Chivayo, ridiculed him as a “fugitive clown” whose threats amounted to little more than noise. The petrol-bombing of Geza’s Sanyati home on 29 March 2025, which he attributed to political enemies without evidence, was cited by his detractors as a possible fabrication or consequence of his own reckless behaviour. The government, through Information Minister Jenfan Muswere, dismissed his allegations as "delusional rumblings" and accused him of factionalism.

== Death ==
Geza died from cancer at a hospital in South Africa, on 6 February 2026.
