= Sandra Nyaira =

Zimbabwean journalist

- Born: Zimbabwe
- Died: July 13, 2021
- Occupations: Reporter, Journalist

Sandra Nyaira was a Zimbabwean investigative journalist. Communications and public information officer at the United Nations Economic Commission for Africa headquarters in Addis Ababa, Ethiopia Nyaira worked for Voice Of America (VOA) in Washington, DC. Her work was also featured in the London Times, The Guardian and The British Journalism Review. Nyaira rose to fame after she became the first woman in Zimbabwe to take a leadership role in the newsroom at the age of 26 and also became more popular after she was arrested for posting an article exposing corrupt officials.

In April 2001, she wrote articles accusing Robert Mugabe and the then parliamentary speaker Emmerson Mnangagwa of corruption, and again, she was charged with criminal defamation that year.

Nyaira has been a Shorenstein fellow at Harvard University.

On 13 July 2021, it was reported that Nyaira had died of a COVID-19-related illness.
