= Capital punishment in Zimbabwe =

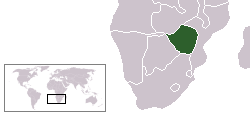
The location of Zimbabwe in sub-saharan Africa.

Capital punishment was abolished in Zimbabwe for most crimes in 2024. The country carried out its last execution in 2005. Zimbabwe abstained during the 2020 United Nations moratorium on the death penalty resolution.

On 31 December 2024, President Emmerson Mnangagwa signed a law abolishing capital punishment in Zimbabwe. Currently the death penalty may only be employed in a state of emergency.
