= Rhodesia Bantu Voters Association =

Political association in colonial Southern Rhodesia

Rhodesia Bantu Voters' Association
- Abbreviation: RBVA
- Formation: 1923
- Founder: Abraham Twala
- Founded at: Southern Rhodesia
- Dissolved: 1930s
- Type: Political association
- Headquarters: Southern Rhodesia
- Official language: English
- Leader: Aaron Jacha
- Affiliations: Southern Rhodesia Missionary Conference

The Rhodesia Bantu Voters' Association (RBVA) was a political association in colonial Southern Rhodesia. It was formed in 1923 to represent the interests of African voters who qualified under the colony's racially restricted franchise system. The association is regarded by historians as one of the earliest attempts at organised African political representation in Rhodesia.

== History ==
The RBVA was established in Salisbury (now Harare) in 1923. Its first meeting was held on 20 January 1923 under the chairmanship of Ernest Dube. Abraham Twala, a teacher and activist, was one of its founders, and Martha Ngano later became general secretary.

In July 1923, the association adopted a constitution that defined its role as "a medium of expression of representative opinion and to formulate a standard policy on Native Affairs... to secure co-operation with the 'Powers that be'... for the advancement of the Bantu peoples". Its motto was "Honour all men. Love the Brotherhood. Fear God."

== Aims ==
The RBVA encouraged Africans who qualified under property, income and education tests to register as voters. It also acted as a forum for civic education and political discussion, and as a representative body to engage with colonial authorities. The membership came mainly from teachers, clerks and small business owners.

== Decline ==
The RBVA gradually lost influence in the late 1940s. Its moderate strategy and reformist outlook produced little tangible change, and African political activism shifted toward more militant and mass-based organisations. By the 1950s, new nationalist bodies such as the Southern Rhodesia African National Congress took its place, followed later by the Zimbabwe African People's Union (ZAPU) and the Zimbabwe African National Union (ZANU).
