= Ahmed Bilal Shah =

Pakistani-Zimbabwean physician (1954–2021)

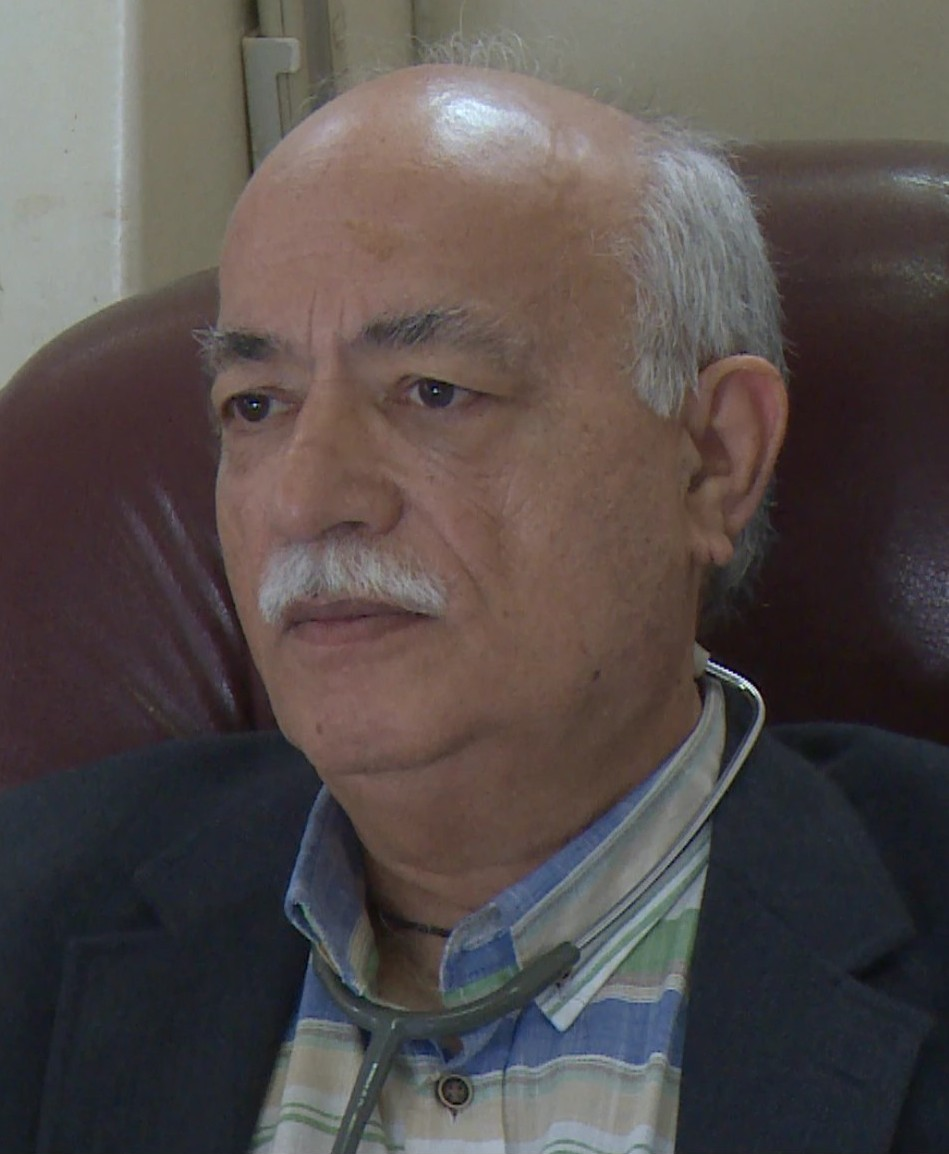
- Shah in 2018
- Born: 1953 or 1954; Pakistan
- Died: June 25, 2021 (aged 67); Harare, Zimbabwe
- Occupations: Medical doctor; television personality
- Years active: 34
- Notable work: You and Your Health and Health Is Wealth on ZBC TV
- Spouse: Tayyba Shah
- Children: 3

Ahmed Bilal Shah (died 25 June 2021) was a Pakistani-Zimbabwean medical practitioner and television personality who was a presenter on ZBC TV.

== Career and background ==
Ahmed Bilal Shah was born in Pakistan. He relocated to Zimbabwe in 1982 then started his medical practice in 1987 working at Parirenyatwa Hospital. He then proceeded to work in high density suburbs of Harare and he was the first foreign doctor to work in the country's high density areas. During that period, Shah went to schools to deliver lectures on good health practices. In early 90s, Shah met one of Zimbabwe's television journalists, Reuben Barwe, who organised his first ZBC TV interview on health issues. From then, an idea for his own TV show emerged. Shah launched You and Your Health programme on ZBC TV that aired from 1992 to 2007. On his programme, Shah interviewed many medical practitioners, including South African surgeon Christiaan Barnard, who performed the world's first human heart transplant in 1967.

Dr Ahmed Bilal Shah also presented ZBC's Good Morning Zimbabwe Health Is Wealth segment which was aired every Thursday morning.

== Death ==
On 25 June 2021, Shah died from COVID-19 at Parirenyatwa Hospital in Harare, at the age of 67. He was buried at Warren Hills cemetery in accordance to his Muslim religion.
