= 1960s in Rhodesia =

- 1980s in Rhodesia
- Other decades
- 1940s | 1950s | 1960s | 1970s | 1980s

During the 1960s, many independence movements emerged in countries near Rhodesia, which had significant effects on political affairs and social conditions within Rhodesia.

== 1960 to 1964 ==
Iain Peter Butchart, a cricketer, was born in Bulawayo on 9 May 1960. Broadcasting of television started in November. The Zimbabwe African People's Union (ZAPU) was formed in 1961 with Joshua Nkomo as leader. The Rhodesian Front won the general elections of 1962 on 14 December. Winston Field then became the Prime Minister of Rhodesia. The Zimbabwe African National Union (ZANU) was formed in 1963 with Robert Mugabe as Secretary. The Federation of Rhodesia and Nyasaland was dissolved on 31 December 1963 as Zambia and Malawi moved towards independence. The government placed Joshua Nkomo, leader and founder of the Zimbabwe African Peoples Union, under restriction on 16 April 1964. Northern Rhodesia gained its independence and Southern Rhodesia became the colony of Rhodesia on 24 October.

== 1965 ==
Ian Smith unilaterally declared the independence (UDI) of Rhodesia from the United Kingdom on 11 November 1965. The Rhodesian government then established a new constitution. Harold Wilson, the British Prime Minister, declared the UDI illegal and an act of rebellion on 12 November. The United Nations Security Council declared the UDI illegal on 19 November, calling on Britain to end the rebellion. The British government suspended the Governor and Directors of Reserve Bank of Rhodesia and froze Rhodesian reserves in Britain on 3 December. Britain imposed total economic sanctions against Rhodesia on 12 December. Harold Wilson appealed to the United Nations for support to end the Rhodesian rebellion on 16 December. The British government declared an oil embargo against Rhodesia on 17 December.

== 1966 to 1967 ==
The United Nations Security Council agreed that the United Kingdom should use force to prevent oil from reaching Rhodesia via Beira, Mozambique on 10 April 1966. Ian Smith, the Rhodesian Prime Minister, and Harold Wilson, the British Prime Minister, met on 2 December 1966 on HMS Tiger to discuss the possibility of a settlement. The United Nations voted for selected mandatory sanctions, including oil, against Rhodesia on 16 December. Zimbabwe African People's Union and the South African African National Congress formed an alliance in January 1967 for armed struggle against Rhodesia and South Africa. Cuthbert Alport, Baron Alport and former High Commissioner to Central African Federation, visited Rhodesia on 14 June to discover whether the stalemate could be broken.

== 1968 to 1969 ==
In 1968 the YMCA opened and the Gonarezhou National Park was declared. The United Nations Security Council approved comprehensive mandatory sanctions against Rhodesia through Resolution 253 on 29 May. Ian Smith, the Rhodesian Prime Minister, and Harold Wilson, the British Prime Minister, met on HMS Fearless for talks from 10–13 October. George Thomson, the Secretary of State for Commonwealth Affairs and Maurice Foley, British Under-Secretary of State, visited Rhodesia for talks on 2 November. The talks ended in deadlock. George Thomson and Maurice Foley met with detained activists, Joshua Nkomo of the Zimbabwe African People's Union and Ndabaningi Sithole, founder of the Zimbabwe African National Union, on 7 November. Ebrahim Essop-Adam, a cricket player, was born in Salisbury on 16 November. The government held a referendum on a new Constitution and Republican status on 20 June 1969. Humphrey Gibbs resigned as Governor of Rhodesia on 24 June. The British Residual Mission in Salisbury, and Rhodesia House in London, both closed on 14 July.

== Births ==
- 6 February 1966 – Shepherd Gundu Chengeta, politician (died 2023).
- 9 January 1967 – Gary Teichmann, rugby player.
