= Paradzai Zimondi =

Zimbabwean independence activist (1947–2021)

Rtd. Major General Paradzai Zimondi

Commissioner-General for Prisons and Corrections Services
- In office 1 April 1998 – 1 November 2020
- President: Robert Mugabe; Emmerson Mnangagwa

Personal details
- Born: Paradzai Willings Zimondi; 4 March 1947 Uzumba District, Federation of Rhodesia and Nyasaland (now Zimbabwe)
- Died: 22 January 2021 (aged 73) Harare, Zimbabwe
- Party: ZANU–PF
- Spouse(s): Doreen Ruzai Gandari; Annie Flora Imagine Chairuka
- Children: 2
- Education: Manyika Primary School, Uzumba; Umvuma United Primary School, Mvuma; Makosa Primary School, Mutoko; Nyamuzuwe High School, Mutoko

Military service
- Allegiance: ZANU (1974–1980); Zimbabwe (1980–1997)
- Branch/service: ZANLA; Zimbabwe National Army
- Years of service: 1974–1997
- Rank: Major General
- Battles/wars: Rhodesian Bush War

Paradzai Willings Zimondi (4 March 1947 – 22 January 2021) was a Zimbabwean military officer and security chief. A decorated war hero in Zimbabwe for his service in the Rhodesian Bush War, he later attained the rank of major general in the Zimbabwean army in its post-independent period. After his military retirement in 1997, he served for 22 years as the Prisons and Corrections Services Commissioner-General.

Zimondi was also a senior official of the military junta that staged coups in Zimbabwe in favor of Robert Mugabe. He was part of the Joint Operations Command, a de facto military planning committee in Zimbabwe.

== Career ==
During the Rhodesian Bush War, Zimondi took the nom de guerre of Comrade Tonderai Nyika. In 1974, he joined ZANLA, the military wing of the Zimbabwe African National Union (ZANU), and received his initial guerrilla training at Mgagao Training Camp in Tanzania, after which he was sent as a training advisor to Chimoio in western Mozambique. He rose to become the provincial commander in Manica Province, where he led the ZANLA forces to major successes in the battles of the Ruda, Gandayi, the attack on Umtali (Mutare), Mavhonde (Mavonde), and Grand Reef. The battles of Mavhonde and Grand Reef were decisive in breaking the spirit of the Rhodesian Army.

Following the end of the Rhodesian Bush War, Zimondi served as the military governor of the ZANLA-occupied areas of Manica Province in Mozambique and adjacent areas in Manicaland Province in Zimbabwe.

In 1981, he was attested into the Zimbabwe National Army as a colonel and was subsequently promoted to major general. Among his military posts was Commander of the Presidential Guard.

In 1997, Zimondi joined the Zimbabwe Prison Services as a Deputy Commissioner, where he undertook to propose reforms after studying the British, Danish, and Swedish prison systems. The following year, he was appointed first Acting Commissioner, and then Commissioner-General, following the retirement of long-serving Langton Chigwida. Among his accomplishments as director, he significantly improved health services for prisoners, and expanded the number of prison farms from sixteen to twenty-four. Zimondi retired from the Prison Service effective 1 November 2020.

He was placed on sanctions lists by the European Union in 2002 and the United States in 2003. He remained on the lists until his death.

== Personal life ==
Zimondi was born in 1947 to Charles Zimondi and Abigail Karimazondo Zimondi in the Uzumba District of Mashonaland East Province. He attended Nyamuzuwe High School in Mutoko, but left to become a freedom fighter in the Zimbabwe African National Liberation Army (ZANLA).

He married Annie Flora Imagine Chairuka, and had two children.

Zimondi died of COVID-19 during the COVID-19 pandemic in Zimbabwe and was buried in the cemetery at the National Heroes' Acre.
