= 1945 in Southern Rhodesia =

The following lists events that happened during 1945 in Southern Rhodesia.

== Incumbents ==
- Prime Minister: Godfrey Huggins

== Events ==
- African railway workers strike
- The African National Council is revived under the leadership of Reverend Thompson Samkange

== Births ==
- July 20 – Simbarashe Mumbengegwi, diplomat and politician
- September 12 – Robson Mrombe, athlete
- Thomas Mapfumo, musician

== See also ==
- Years in Zimbabwe
