= 1978 in Rhodesia =

- Decades: 1960s; 1970s
- See also: Other events of 1978; Timeline of Rhodesian history

The following lists events that happened during 1978 in Rhodesia.

== Incumbents ==
- President:
  - until 31 August: John Wrathall
  - 31 August-1 November: Henry Everard
  - starting 1 November: Jack William Pithey
- Prime Minister: Ian Smith

== Events ==
=== January ===
- 3 January - Leopard Rock Hotel in the Vumba Mountains is damaged after a guerilla rocket attack.

=== March ===
- 3 March - The Salisbury Agreement what later became known as the Internal Settlement, aimed at leading to black majority rule signed by Prime Minister Ian Smith, UANC president Bishop Abel Muzorewa, ZUPO president Senator Chief Jeremiah Chirau, and ANC (Sithole) president the Rev. Ndabaningi Sithole.
- 14 March - United Nations Security Council Resolution 423 condemned the Rhodesian Internal Settlement
- 21 March - Transitional Government aimed at leading to black majority rule formally established as part of the Salisbury Agreement, Internal Settlement.

=== April ===
- 14 April - Nine black ministers are sworn in to serve on the Ministerial Council of the Transitional Government.

=== May ===
- 19 May - Two Swiss Red Cross workers and their African assistant are killed by fighters near the Mozambique border.

=== June ===
- 23 June - In the Vumba massacre, 12 whites were murdered. 8 British missionaries (3 men and 5 women) and 4 of their children were bayonetted to death at Emmanuel Mission School at Vumba by guerillas. The dead belonged to the Elim Pentecostal Church.
- 24 June - Rhodesia beat Western Transvaal 41-9 in a Currie Cup match played at Hartsfield Rugby Ground, Bulawayo.
- 28 June - Three Zimbabwe African People's Union fighters kill two German missionaries.

=== August ===
- 15 August - The Rhodesia Herald was renamed The Herald.

=== September ===
- 3 September - Air Rhodesia Flight 825 was shot down by guerillas and the survivors were shot on the ground, killing 48.

== Deaths ==
- 17 June - Archie Dunaway, an American Baptist evangelist, is stabbed to death by ZAPU fighters at the Sanyati Mission Hospital, 217 km west of Salisbury
- 28 June - Clifford Dupont, 1st President of Rhodesia dies aged 72.
