= 1980s in Zimbabwe =

- Other decades
- 1960s | 1970s | 1980s | 1990s | 2000s

Zimbabwe regained its independence from the United Kingdom on 17 April 1980. Canaan Banana, a Methodist minister and theologian, became the first President of Zimbabwe on 18 April.

On 17 February 1982, the government of Zimbabwe accused Joshua Nkomo, Minister of House Affairs, leader and founder of the Zimbabwe African People's Union (ZAPU), of plotting a coup d'état, and dismissed him from the cabinet.

On the evening of 23 July 1982, a safari tour bus occupied by its bus driver and nine foreign tourists were driving towards Victoria Falls for the final leg of their safari excursion when as they were an estimated 64.4 kilometers (40 miles) north of Bulawayo, the driver stopped before some fallen trees that had blocked his path moments before they were ambushed by rebel supporters of Nkomo. For unknown reasons, the men released the bus driver and all three female tourists while they kidnapped and held the six other tourists (two Americans, two Australians and two Britons) hostage. The following day, as the result of the government's rejection to meet the opposition group's demand of releasing two of their former commanders from captivity, President Banana and Prime Minister Robert Mugabe (Zimbabwe African National Union (ZANU)) sent over a thousand of their troops across their country to find and rescue the tourists. Despite the largest manhunt operation in the nation's history, the six foreigners were executed two days later without any notice in advance.

The Gukurahundi (also known as the "Matabeleland genocide") began in 1983. More than 300,000 youths signed up for service in the Youth Brigade.

On 13th June 1983, the Zimbabwean government announced that they had captured and interrogated the group's captors, whom the majority of them admitted to executing them along with giving the date of their collective deaths. However, they only stated where the tourists died and not where they were interred.

On 7 March 1985, the government announced the discovery and positive identification of the group's remains, which were all found the previous week in shallow graves somewhere in the Lupane District of Matabeleland. The remains of all six foreigners were returned to their respective countries a few months later.

On 7 April 1986, two of the convicted murderers from the 1982 tourist ambush and kidnapping (27-year-old Austin Mpofu and 44-year-old Gilbert Ngwenya) were executed via hanging in Harare.

Prime Minister Robert Mugabe and Joshua Nkomo signed a Unity Accord on 22 December 1987, giving the ZAPU leader a place in the government, freeing dissidents, and bringing a formal end to violence of the Gukurahundi. Mugabe became the new President of Zimbabwe after reforming the constitution on 31 December 1987, abolishing the position of Prime Minister.

Morgan Tsvangirai was elected Secretary General of the Zimbabwe Congress of Trade Unions in 1988.

The Zimbabwe African People's Union (ZAPU) merged with the Zimbabwe African National Union (ZANU) under the name Zimbabwe African National Union – Patriotic Front (ZANU-PF) on 19 December 1989.
