= United Nations Security Council Resolution 326 =

UN Security Council Resolution 326
- Date: 2 February 1973
- Meeting no.: 1,691
- Code: S/RES/326 (Document)
- Subject: Provocation by Southern Rhodesia
- Voting summary: 13 voted for; None voted against; 2 abstained
- Result: Adopted

Security Council composition
- Permanent members: China; France; Soviet Union; United Kingdom; United States
- Non-permanent members: Australia; Austria; Guinea; India; Indonesia; Kenya; Panama; Peru; Sudan; Yugoslavia

United Nations Security Council Resolution 326, adopted on February 2, 1973, concerned with provocative and aggressive acts committed by Rhodesia against Zambia and disturbed by the continued military intervention of South Africa in Rhodesia, the Council condemned all acts of provocation and harassment against Zambia.

The resolution demanded the immediate withdrawal of all South African military forces from Rhodesia and from its border with Zambia and decided to dispatch a special mission (consisting of 4 members of the Council to be appointed by the President) to assess the situation in the area and report back by March 1, 1973. The Council also took the opportunity to reaffirm all of its previous positions against the nations of Rhodesia and South Africa.

The resolution was adopted with 13 votes to none, with the United Kingdom and United States abstaining.

== See also ==
- List of United Nations Security Council Resolutions 301 to 400 (1971–1976)
