= 1936 in Southern Rhodesia =

== Incumbents ==
- Prime Minister: Godfrey Huggins

== Events ==
- Monuments and Relics Act 1936, replaces the 1902 Ancient Monuments Protection Ordinance and 1912 Bushmen Relics Ordinance

== Births ==
- 5 March - Canaan Sodindo Banana, Methodist minister, theologian and the first President of Zimbabwe (died 2003)
