= 1947 in Southern Rhodesia =

The following lists events that happened during 1947 in Southern Rhodesia.

== Incumbents ==
- Prime Minister: Godfrey Huggins

== Births ==
- February 23 - Godfrey Chidyausiku, politician and chief justice since 2001
- March 11 - Ian Robinson, cricket umpire
- October 23 - Miles Anderson, stage and television actor
- date unclear - Charles Mungoshi, writer
