= Public holidays in Zimbabwe =

The following is a list of holidays in Zimbabwe:

== Public holidays ==
Date	English name
1 January	New Year's Day
21 February	National Youth Day
Friday before Easter Sunday	Good Friday
Saturday before Easter Sunday	Holy Saturday
First Sunday after the Paschal full moon	Easter Sunday
Monday after Easter Sunday	Easter Monday
18 April	Independence Day
1 May	Labour Day/Workers day
25 May	Africa Day
Second Monday in August	Heroes' Day
Second Tuesday in August	Defence Forces Day
15 September	Munhumutapa Day
22 December	National Unity Day
25 December	Christmas Day
26 December	Boxing Day

== See also ==
- Public holidays in Rhodesia, for historical holidays
