= History of Rhodesia (1965–1979) =

Flag of Rhodesia (1965–1968)

Flag of Rhodesia (1968–1979)

The history of Rhodesia from 1965 to 1979 covers Rhodesia's time as a state unrecognised by the international community following the predominantly white minority government's Unilateral Declaration of Independence on 11 November 1965. Headed by Prime Minister Ian Smith, the Rhodesian Front remained in government until 1 June 1979, when the country was reconstituted as Zimbabwe.

== Declaration of independence ==
After several unsuccessful attempts to persuade Britain to grant independence, the government announced the Unilateral Declaration of Independence (UDI) on 11 November 1965. Smith had sought to retain Rhodesia's link with the British monarchy by keeping Queen Elizabeth II as nominal head of state, but she refused to accept the title of Queen of Rhodesia, and Sir Humphrey Gibbs, still internationally recognised as the only legal authority in Rhodesia, refused to recognise Smith's authority. Smith responded by ignoring Sir Humphrey and appointing the Deputy Prime Minister Dupont, as the Officer Administrating the Government (best described as an interim Governor).

Britain did not respond to the UDI with force. Instead it attempted using economic sanctions. This included ending the link between sterling and the Rhodesian currency, seizing assets and banning the import of Rhodesian tobacco. Smith's government retaliated by defaulting on its (British-guaranteed) debts, leaving the British liable while at the same time balancing its budget. The United Nations imposed economic sanctions in 1968 after having adopted Resolution 216 condemning the declaration of independence as one "made by a racist minority." The economic sanctions though were only partly successful; some strategic minerals, especially chromium, were exported to willing buyers in Europe and North America, which resulted in a strengthening of the economy.

== 1965 to 1972 ==
The Rhodesian Front held power from 1962 until 1979, forming the majority in a parliament, in which 50 of the 66 seats were reserved for the white minority of the country. It was a broadly populist party with support mainly from the working class and recent immigrants. The main white opposition was the Rhodesia Party which had support from the business elite, the professional class and from second or third generation Rhodesians. There were two areas of political life: that of race, and that of all other policies. Economically, at least, the government's policies were quite liberal. Thus, many state benefits were provided to the white minority. The black opposition conversely wanted an end to racial discrimination within the state and absolute political equality for all races. Outside of the area of race, that is, economically and socially, it was more conservative. It advocated less government interference in the economy and free trade. In May 1965, the Rhodesian Front Party again won the general election.

In 1969, the constitution was modified. The most significant 1969 modification was the formal separation of two electoral rolls by race. The A roll was reserved for Europeans and the B roll for non-Europeans. The Assembly constituencies were reformed so that there were 50 A roll, and 8 B roll seats. In addition, the tribal chiefs were able to elect another 8 members. Effectively, the result was that 270,000 whites had 50 seats and 6 million Africans had 16 seats in the Assembly. These reforms served only to reinforce black rejection of the system.

By the time of the early 1970s, the issue of race began to dominate all others and the regime started to repress its white opponents. By 1975, although officially democratic, the regime had started to lock up even peaceful opponents of white domination. Black Rhodesians regarded their legal situation as morally unjustifiable and wanted full equality. From August 1964 to December 1974, Robert Mugabe was imprisoned without trial. Although legal, it was emblematic of a regime that disregarded human rights as part of its fight against terrorism.

Both ZAPU and ZANU began campaigns of guerrilla warfare around 1966. Initially, it was rather sporadic, limited in its scope and consequences. It increased dramatically after 1972, causing destruction, economic dislocation, casualties, and a slump in white morale. In 1974, the major African nationalists groups, (ZAPU) and (ZANU), were united into the "Patriotic Front" and combined their military forces, at least nominally. These guerrilla raids led to escalation in white emigration from Rhodesia. This violent struggle became known as the Rhodesian Bush War, lasting from 1966 to 1979. The accounts of some of these guerrilla incursions into Rhodesia are described in the Peter Stiff novel, The Rain Goddess.

Atrocities were committed by both sides. The government labelled its opponents terrorists and saw itself as legitimate. ZAPU and ZANU saw themselves as freedom fighters and saw the government as tyrannical. The guerrilla movement had a communist ideology and was partially funded by the Soviet Union and China. Initially, the war was very one-sided since the Rhodesian government was able to deploy an overwhelming superiority in manpower, firepower and mobility. Containing the insurgency required little more than police action.

In April 1970, a general election was held with the Rhodesian Front easily winning. Ian Smith portrayed his government as not being racialist, and sought to postpone the question of what to do about the problems in the farming industry until after the election. Indeed, he was able to do so because more radical and more racist parties had at that time been formed and stood in the election.

== 1972 to 1979 ==
The Rhodesia general election of 30 July 1974 saw the Rhodesian Front of Ian Smith re-elected, once more winning every one of the 50 seats reserved to white voters. The Rhodesia Party, a white opposition party, had been formed by ex-Rhodesian Front MP Allan Savory in 1972. They were a moderate group which advocated more moves towards including the African population in internal politics. Early in June 1974, Savory made a speech at Hartley in which he was reported as saying that if he had been a black Rhodesian, he would be a terrorist. The uproar was such that Savory was forced from the leadership (replaced by Gibbs) and resigned from the party on 16 June. Despite the turmoil, the Rhodesia Party managed to nominate candidates in 40 out of the 50 seats. 77% of the white minority population voted for the Rhodesian Front, again demonstrating their continued strong opposition to black majority rule.

The situation changed suddenly after the end of Portuguese colonial rule in Mozambique in 1975. Rhodesia now found itself almost entirely surrounded by hostile states and even South Africa, its only real ally, was pressing for a settlement. The Rhodesian Bush War intensified during this period. There were 2,504 vehicle detonations of land mines (mainly Soviet TM46s), killing 632 people and injuring 4,410. The new Mozambican government threw its full weight behind the ZANLA cause and Rhodesia's entire border with Mozambique became a front line across which guerrillas began to operate freely. Zambia became another front which was opened when the Zambian government also gave sanctuary to the guerrillas.

In the early 1970s, informal attempts at settlement were renewed between the United Kingdom and the Rhodesian administration.

The coming of independence in Angola and Mozambique in 1975 also altered the power balance in another way. It forced South Africa and the United States to rethink their attitudes to the area, to protect their economic and political interests. Attempts were made by both countries to pressure Smith into accepting majority rule. With Kenneth Kaunda's Zambian support the nationalist groups were convinced to come together under the united front of Abel Muzorewa's United African National Council. The imprisoned nationalist leaders were released.

Rhodesia began to lose vital economic and military support from South Africa, which, while sympathetic to the white minority government, never accorded it diplomatic recognition. The South Africans placed limits on the fuel and munitions they supplied to the Rhodesian military. They also withdrew the personnel and equipment that they had previously provided to aid the war effort. In 1976 the South African and United States governments worked together to place pressure on Smith to agree to a form of majority rule. The Rhodesians now offered more concessions, but those concessions were insufficient to end the war.

At the time, some Rhodesians said the still embittered history between the British-dominated Rhodesia and the Afrikaner-dominated South Africa partly led South Africa to withdraw its aid to Rhodesia. Ian Smith said in his memoirs that even though many white South Africans supported Rhodesia, South African Prime Minister John Vorster's policy of détente with the Black African states ended up with Rhodesia being offered as the "sacrificial lamb" to buy more time for South Africa. Other observers perceive South Africa's distancing itself from Rhodesia as being an early move in the process that led to majority rule in South Africa itself.

In 1976 South Africa saw settlement of the Rhodesian question as vital on several fronts: to cauterise the wound of the psychological blow … caused by her defeat in the Angolan conflict; to pre-empt possible Cuban intervention in Rhodesia and the possibility of South Africa being sucked into another Cold War regional conflict without the support and endorsement of the western powers

By early 1978, militant victories put the Rhodesian armed forces on the defensive. The government abandoned its early strategy of trying to defend the borders in favour of trying to defend key economic areas and lines of communication with South Africa, while the rest of the countryside became a patchwork of "no-go areas." Rhodesia's front-line forces never contained more than 25,000 troops, eight tanks (Polish made T-55s) and nine old Hawker Hunter jets. Those forces could still launch raids on enemy bases, but Rhodesia faced diplomatic isolation, economic collapse and military defeat.

During the closing stages of the conflict, the Rhodesian government resorted to biological warfare. Watercourses at several sites close to the Mozambique border were deliberately contaminated with cholera and the toxin Sodium Coumadin, an anti-coagulant commonly used as the active ingredient in rat poison. Food stocks in the area were contaminated with anthrax spores. These biological attacks had little impact on the fighting capability of ZANLA, but caused considerable distress to the local population. Over 10,000 people contracted anthrax in the period 1978 to 1980, of whom 200 died. The facts about this episode became known during the hearings of the South African Truth and Reconciliation Commission during the late 1990s.

The work of journalists such as Lord Richard Cecil, son of the Marquess of Salisbury, stiffened the morale of Rhodesians and their overseas supporters. Lord Richard produced regular news reports such as the Thames TV 'Frontline Rhodesia' features. These reports typically contrasted the incompetent insurgents with the "superbly professional" government troops, both black and white. A group of ZANLA insurgents killed Lord Richard on 20 April 1978 when he parachuted into enemy territory with a Rhodesian airborne unit and landed in the middle of a group of ZANLA fighters.

The shooting down on 3 September 1978 of the civilian Vickers Viscount airliner Hunyani, Air Rhodesia Flight RH825, in the Kariba area by ZIPRA insurgents using a surface-to-air missile, and the subsequent massacre of its survivors, is widely considered to be the event that finally destroyed the Rhodesians' will to continue the war. Although militarily insignificant, the loss of this aircraft (and a second Viscount, the Umniati, in 1979) demonstrated the reach of insurgents extended to Rhodesian civil society.

The Rhodesians' means to continue the war were also eroding fast. In December 1978, a ZANLA unit penetrated the outskirts of Salisbury and fired a volley of rockets and incendiary device rounds into the main oil storage depot – the most heavily defended economic asset in the country. The storage tanks burned for five days, giving off a column of smoke that could be seen 80 miles away. Half a million barrels of petroleum product (comprising Rhodesia's strategic oil reserve) were lost. At a stroke, the country's annual budget deficit was increased by 20%.

The government's defence spending increased from R$30m, 8.5% of the national budget in 1971 to 1972, to R$400m in 1978 to 1979, 47% of the national budget. In 1980 the post-independence government of Zimbabwe inherited a US$700m national debt.

The Rhodesian army continued its "mobile counter-offensive" strategy of holding key positions ("vital asset ground") while carrying out raids into the no-go areas and into neighbouring countries. These raids became increasingly costly and unproductive. For example, in April 1979 special forces carried out a raid on Joshua Nkomo's residence in Lusaka (Zambia) with the stated intention of assassinating him. Nkomo and his family left hastily a few hours before the raid – having clearly been warned that the raid was coming. Rumours of treachery circulated within Rhodesia. It was variously suggested that the army command had been penetrated by British MI6 or that people in the Rhodesian establishment were positioning themselves for life after independence. The loyalty of the country's Central Intelligence Organisation became suspect.

In 1979, some special forces units were accused of using counter terrorist operations as cover for ivory poaching and smuggling. Colonel Reid-Daly (commander of the Selous Scouts) was court martialled and dismissed for insubordination. Meanwhile, support for ZANU-PF was growing amongst the black soldiers who made up 70% of the Rhodesian army.

By the end of 1978, the need to cut a deal was apparent to most Rhodesians, but not to all. Ian Smith had dismissed his intransigent Defence Minister, P. K. van der Byl, as early as 1976. "PK" had been a hard-line opponent of any form of compromise with domestic opposition or the international community since before UDI. Van der Byl was quoted as saying, "it is better to fight to the last man and the last cartridge and die with some honour. Because, what is being presented to us here is a degree of humiliation ..."

PK eventually retired to his country estate outside Cape Town, but there were elements in Rhodesia, mainly embittered former security force personnel, who forcibly opposed majority rule up to and well beyond independence. New white immigrants continued to arrive in Rhodesia right up to the eve of independence.

== Majority rule ==
Continuing talks failed to bring the two sides to an agreement, despite changes to the nationalist "line-up", now called the Patriotic Front (PF), a union of ZANU and ZAPU. Muzorewa had since formed a new party, the United African National Council (UANC), as had Sithole, who had formed a breakaway party from ZANU, called ZANU Ndonga. In the face of a white exodus, Ian Smith made an agreement with Muzorewa and Sithole, known as the Internal Settlement. This led to the holding of new elections in 1979, in which black Africans would be in the majority for the first time. The country was renamed Zimbabwe Rhodesia in 1979, with Muzorewa as Prime Minister.

However, the new state was not recognised by the international community, which continued to press for a settlement involving the Patriotic Front. Finally in 1979 under the Lancaster House Agreement, its legal status as the British colony of Southern Rhodesia was restored, in preparation for free elections and independence as Zimbabwe.

== Economy ==
The Rhodesian economy experienced a modest boom in the early 1970s. Real per capita earnings for blacks and whites reached record highs, although the disparity in incomes between blacks and whites remained, with blacks earning only about one-tenth as much as whites. After 1975, however, Rhodesia's economy was undermined by the cumulative effects of sanctions, declining earnings from commodity exports, worsening guerilla conflict, and increasing white emigration. When Mozambique severed economic ties, the Ian Smith regime was forced to depend on South Africa for access to the outside world. Real gross domestic product (GDP) declined between 1974 and 1979, before full independence in 1980. An increasing proportion of the national budget, an estimated 30%–40% per year, was allocated to defence, and a large budget deficit raised the public debt burden substantially.

The manufacturing sector, already well-developed before the Unilateral Declaration of Independence (UDI) in 1965, was given a major stimulus by the imposition of United Nations sanctions. The sanctions obliged Rhodesian industry to diversify and create many import-substitution undertakings to compensate for loss of traditional sources of imports. Rhodesian processing of local raw materials also grew rapidly. Major growth industries included steel and steel products, heavy equipment, transportation equipment, ferrochrome, textiles, and food processing.

== Education ==
=== African education ===
In 1966 the Ministry of Education announced they would be implementing a "New Plan" for the education of African children. This involved a reduction having four teachers for the first five grades of primary school where previously there had been five and reducing the length of primary education from eight years to seven.
