= British Army during the Victorian Era =

Military history and organisation

British Army
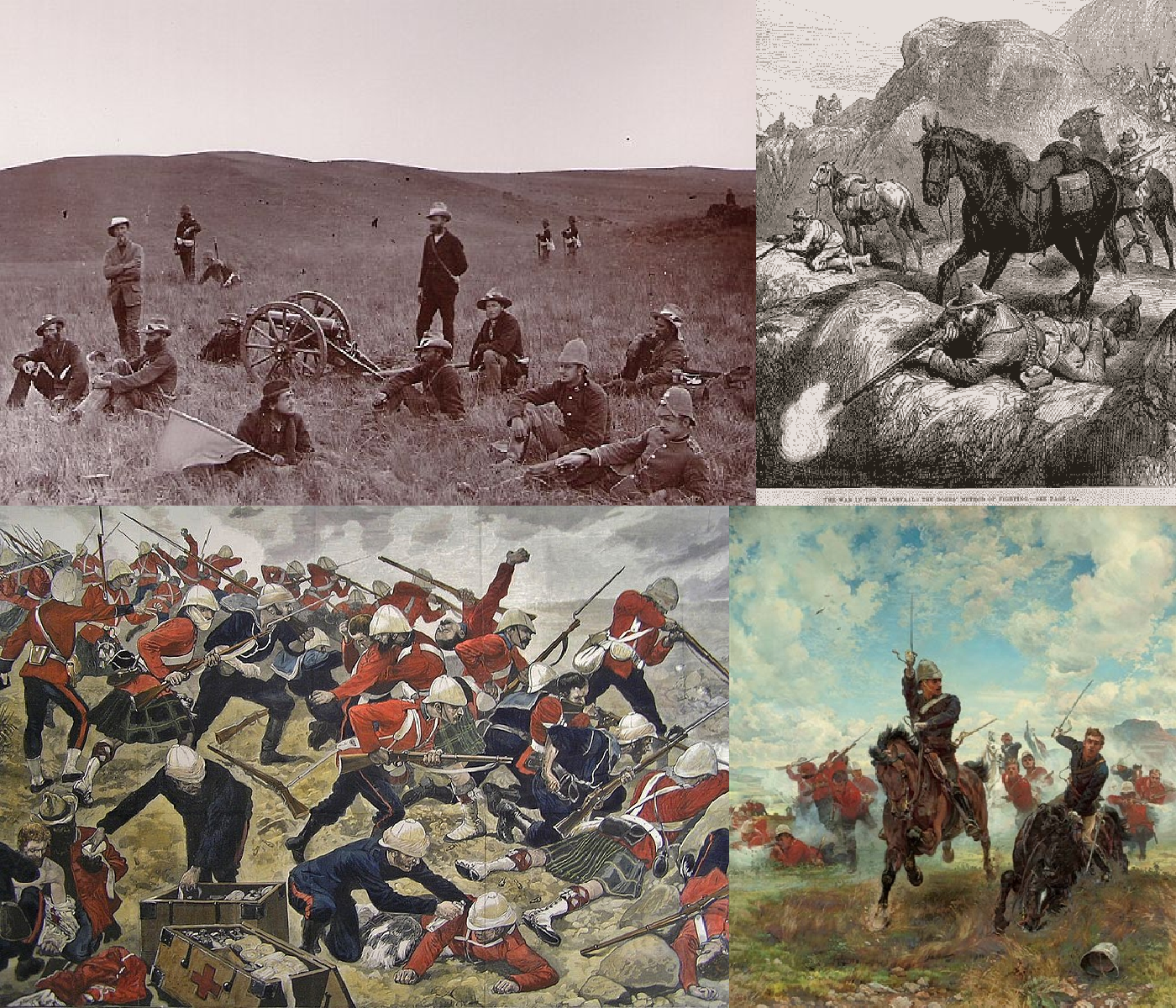
- Service branches: Royal Artillery
- Headquarters: Whitehall

Leadership
- Commander-in-Chief of the Forces: Rowland Hill; Arthur Wellesley, 1st Duke of Wellington; Henry Hardinge, 1st Viscount Hardinge; Prince George, Duke of Cambridge; Garnet Wolseley, 1st Viscount Wolseley
- Secretary of State and War: Jonathan Peel; Edward Cardwell; Gathorne Hardy; Frederick Stanley; Hugh Childers; Edward Stanhope; Henry Campbell-Bannerman et al.

Personnel
- Active personnel: 124,000 (Peak 1880-81)
- Reserve personnel: 80,000 – 107,000 (1899)

The British Army during the Victorian era served through a period of great technological and social change. Queen Victoria ascended the throne in 1837, and died in 1901. Her long reign was marked by the steady expansion and consolidation of the British Empire, rapid industrialisation and the enactment of liberal reforms by both Liberal and Conservative governments within Britain.

The British Army began the period with few differences from the British Army of the Napoleonic Wars that won at Waterloo. There were three main periods of the Army's development during the era. From the end of the Napoleonic Wars to the mid-1850s, the Duke of Wellington and his successors attempted to maintain its organisation and tactics as they had been in 1815, with only minor changes. In 1854, the Crimean War, and the Indian Rebellion of 1857 highlighted the shortcomings of the Army, but entrenched interests prevented major reforms from taking place. From 1868 to 1881, sweeping changes were made by Liberal governments, giving it the broad structure it retained until 1914.

Upon Victoria's death, the Army was still engaged in the Second Boer War, but other than expedients adopted for that war, it was recognisably the army that would enter the First World War. The Industrial Revolution had changed its weapons, transport and equipment, and social changes such as better education had prompted changes to the terms of service and outlook of many soldiers. Nevertheless, it retained many features inherited from the Duke of Wellington's army, and since its prime function was to maintain an empire which covered almost a quarter of the globe, it differed in many ways from the conscripted armies of continental Europe.

== Leadership, control and organisation ==
The supreme commander of the British Army was the Commander-in-Chief of the Forces, based in Whitehall. The Commander-in-Chief was primarily responsible for military discipline, training, personnel matters, promotions (which until 1871 were often still obtained through the purchase of commissions) and the transfer of units. He was the Crown's central point of contact for military affairs. Until 1904, the British Army did not have its own General Staff. This led to profound structural paralysis, as there was no overarching body to reconcile military requirements with strategic and financial realities. Until the reforms of 1855, the Army was administered by a large number of separate departments and committees, each of which operated with a high degree of autonomy and often reported directly to the Crown or to various Cabinet ministers.

This fragmentation resulted in troop movements frequently taking place without consultation with the departments, which led to avoidable supply shortages. These shortcomings were particularly evident in the area of logistics, as the Commissariat, which was responsible for catering and transport, had long been subordinate to the Treasury and thus operated outside the direct authority of the military command.

The catastrophic logistical and administrative shortcomings that came to light during the Crimean War led to the realisation that the system was outdated and incapable of supporting a modern army. In response, the government initiated a comprehensive administrative reform. In 1855, the office of Secretary of State for War was created, consolidating many of the tasks that had previously been distributed among various ministries. The Secretary of State for War was now responsible to Parliament for the efficiency and administration of the army. The former independent departments, including the Commissariat, the Army Medical Department, the Paymaster General’s Office and the Board of Ordnance, were dissolved and placed under the War Office.

In practice, however, this led to a cumbersome and inefficient bureaucracy, which was particularly evident in the Board of Ordnance. Instead of simplifying procedures through the merger, the established administrative structures were transferred to the new ministry virtually unchanged. As a result, the individual departments continued to operate as isolated units, which prevented efficient coordination. Furthermore, the physical separation persisted, as the War Office moved into premises on Pall Mall, whilst the military leadership remained in Whitehall. This distance prevented direct communication and thus coordination between the civil administration and military planning. Additionally, the Commander-in-Chief retained considerable powers regarding command authority, discipline, appointments and promotions, operated in parallel with the War Office, and was subordinate to the Secretary of State for War only in name.

== Recruitment and Training ==
=== Rank and file ===
Before the Cardwell reforms in the early 1870s, recruitment for the British Army was largely unregulated and often problematic. Enlistment was usually voluntary, but was encouraged by bounties, which were cash payments to recruits. This system led to widespread abuse, with recruits collecting the bounty, deserting and then repeating the process elsewhere. Recruitment took place in various ways, primarily through regimental recruiting parties, which actively sought out physically fit men in towns and villages, especially in poorer areas. Other recruitment options included pensioners, the regular personnel of militia units and direct recruitment in the individual regimental headquarters. Many recruits were driven to enlist by poverty, unemployment or the prospect of adventure, so that the quality of the new soldiers varied greatly.

The recruitment authorities were paid for every man they recruited. This naturally led recruiters to use all kinds of tricks to find new people. Even thieves, vagrants and other undesirable individuals could be recruited. False promises of high salaries and luxurious living conditions were used. Many recruitments took place in pubs, where dishonest recruiters persuaded men under the influence of alcohol to sign up (‘taking the Queen's shilling’).

The term of service was long (often 21 years), and the living conditions in the ranks, as well as the strict discipline and reputation of the army, deterred many potential volunteers. The army was also not considered a particularly prestigious profession, and the desertion rate was high. The Cardwell reforms, which began in 1870, fundamentally changed the recruitment of the British Army. The system of long service was replaced by short service and the call-up of reservists. Soldiers now typically enlisted for twelve years, spending the first six years on active duty and the remaining six years in the reserves.In 1881, short service for the infantry was increased to seven years with the colours, and five with the reserve, of the twelve-year enlistment period.

After 1870, the terms of service were formulated more clearly in recruitment advertisements, and recruitment officers were instructed to behave appropriately and to keep their offices away from public drinking establishments such as inns. Any recruit who could prove that he had been deceived during recruitment was immediately discharged, and the recruiting officer had to bear the associated costs. In 1870, recruitment bonuses that encouraged desertion and false enlistments were abolished, and measures were taken to make medical examinations more rigorous and thorough. In the following years, greater emphasis was placed on public relations and advertising. Cardwell also introduced local recruitment depots, linking regiments to specific geographical areas, which promoted local identity and made recruitment more systematic and efficient. In total, there were sixty-six brigade districts (later renamed regimental districts) spread across England, Scotland and Wales.

=== Officers ===
Between 1815 and 1914, the training and selection of officers in the British Army were largely determined by social background, with the majority of officers hailing from the nobility and the gentry. The officers’ authority rested more on their character and social status than on their professional competence or military training. Their social background enabled them to lead troops who mostly came from more modest, rural backgrounds, so that many officers regarded military service as a natural extension of their authority over the lower classes. Until the Crimean War, there were minimal requirements regarding the training or education of officers, as personal character was valued more highly than military skills. The system of purchase, which allowed officers to acquire their commissions and promotions, contributed to a further decline in the importance of professional qualifications.

Prior to 1849, there were no requirements regarding education or professional competence; most officers had received only a limited, often private, education. Whilst officer cadets in the Artillery and Engineers received their basic training at the Royal Military Academy in Woolwich, attendance at the Royal Military College in Sandhurst was optional for aspiring infantry and cavalry officers. In the 1850s, the Royal Engineers were the first branch of the armed forces to introduce systematic specialist training for newly commissioned officers at Chatham; the course, which lasted around two years, included instruction in surveying, reconnaissance and field fortifications, amongst other subjects. The Royal Artillery soon followed suit with its own course, which involved a 6- to 8-week stay at the Artillery School in Shoeburyness, with the option of further courses upon passing the examination.

In contrast, new officers in the infantry and cavalry were required only to pass a drill examination within two years of their appointment and received no further specialist training. The abolition of the purchase system in 1871 led to the introduction of standardised selection examinations for candidates for an officer’s career. The paths to becoming an officer became more varied: alongside Sandhurst, service in the militia developed into a significant alternative route to an officer’s commission; in 1874, systematic recruitment began at universities; and after 1894, university graduates could be appointed directly as officers. After restructuring and closing cadet training in the early 1870s, it was resumed in 1877, with the number of cadets fluctuating due to reforms and emergencies. From 1889, the training programme at Sandhurst comprised 360 cadets in six companies, who undertook a one-year basic course. By 1892, the training programme had been expanded to a three-semester system, with 120 cadets admitted annually. The curriculum, which was expanded to include French and German by 1897, covered various subject areas such as military engineering, tactics, law and sport, and met the need for professional military expertise within the officer corps. To meet the demand for better training of staff officers, the General Staff College in Camberley was founded in 1857, emerging from the Senior Department. By the beginning of the 20th century, the training system for British Army officers had evolved from a largely informal, socially oriented process into a more structured and professionalised system that placed greater efforts on education, selection procedures and specialised training.

=== Training ===
==== Infantry ====
Rather than focusing on strict discipline and repetitive drills to ensure soldiers responded quickly and precisely to orders on the battlefield, the priority shifted to joint training that encouraged initiative in loose formations. The aim of the training was to understand and implement the changing tactics required by advances in weaponry and technology.

In the home battalions, non-commissioned officers carried out the basic training of recruits. Individual training varied from regiment to regiment and consisted largely of drill exercises, supplemented by barracks duty, equipment maintenance and other tasks. By 1896, the training of infantry recruits had been standardised and codified by law. The twelve-week training programme focused on individual and squad drills, physical training, education and weapon use. After the Coalition Wars, the training manual Field Exercise and Evolutions of the Army (1824) served as the basis for the training of infantry units. In practice, however, a battalion practised three basic formations: the square, which served as a defence against cavalry; various column manoeuvres, which allowed for longer movements and manoeuvres; and the line formation, which was used for short attacks or skirmishes.

The introduction of the Minié rifle in 1851, which was replaced by the Enfield rifle in 1855, and the experiences of the Crimean War of 1854–1856 led to revisions in the 1859 edition of Field Exercises and Evolutions. The greater range and effectiveness of rifle fire was taken into account, so that all troops had to be trained in skirmishing techniques. All attacks, whether carried out in column or line, had to be preceded by skirmish lines. In 1877, skirmishing was replaced by ‘extended order’ in the Infantry Manual. From the late 1870s onwards, training became more flexible to take into account initiative, terrain and other variables. In 1888, training centres for mounted infantry were established at Aldershot, Curragh and Shorncliffe. Mounted infantrymen were soldiers who rode into battle on horseback but dismounted to fight. Regiments had to have one trained officer and thirty-two trained soldiers to form an ad hoc mounted infantry detachment. These soldiers completed a ten-week course that included riding, stable work, horse care, mounted infantry tactics, and marksmanship training.

Until the 1890s, when the value of large-scale manoeuvres was recognised and exercises were resumed, training above battalion level came to a standstill. Each year, the battalions drew up methodical plans for multi-stage, step-by-step training. After about twelve weeks of basic training at the regimental depot, the new soldiers were assigned to the infantry battalions. In their battalion, the new recruits received further training. In winter, the battalions conducted marching exercises and other physical training. From 1 March to 31 October, each rifle company concentrated on field and firing exercises, including combined arms exercises at brigade level in summer and battalion exercises and manoeuvres in larger camps in May. The highlight of this annual training cycle was the autumn manoeuvres at division level, which usually took place in September and October. Large-scale manoeuvres and exercises were carried out until the eve of the Second Boer War (1899–1902) and thereafter usually on an annual basis.

==== Cavalry ====
New cavalry recruits began their training either with their regiment or at a central depot if their unit was stationed abroad. The two-month basic training focused on drill on foot, handling sabres and firearms whilst on foot, physical training and stable duties. This was followed by six to eight months of specialist training, during which the recruits first received 90 to 120 hours of riding lessons, which, in addition to riding, also covered saddling, proper packing and the use of weapons on horseback. Whilst drill on foot continued in the afternoons, theoretical lessons took place in the evenings. At the end of the specialist training, there was a two-week firearms drill comparable to that of the infantry, albeit with slightly less stringent requirements.

From mid-October to mid-March, individual training took place in cross-country riding, mounted weaponry, close combat, as well as guard and field duty. During this period, training in larger formations was suspended, allowing officers to focus more on imparting theoretical and practical knowledge such as reconnaissance, map reading and patrol duty. This duty roster was supplemented by two annual squadron exercises, each lasting three weeks. For this purpose, the unit was relieved of all other duties so that, under the guidance of its officers, it could perfect its closed-formation drill on foot and horseback, as well as tactical field exercises. The spring training (mid-March to the end of May) was primarily devoted to field service and squadron training, ending with an inspection by the regimental and brigade commanders.

Markmanship for the cavalrymen ran from March into the summer, followed by regimental exercises which began in June. In addition, the cavalry regiments sent individual officers and non-commissioned officers on specialist courses: sergeants and corporals were trained as riding instructors at the Riding School in Canterbury, whilst selected officers and non-commissioned officers attended courses in firearms, engineering, signalling, veterinary medicine and farriery at various military schools.

The remounts, together with the recruits who joined at various times throughout the year, made up around 10 per cent of the regiment’s strength. They were generally four years old on joining, and their training lasted about a year. Upon arrival, following a veterinary examination, they were assigned to a designated riding instructor. The training consisted of breaking in and dressage for the first to third months, familiarisation with weapons and bridling in the fourth month, and formation training from the fifth to the twelfth month. Due to the lengthy training period, there was usually a shortage of horses actually available for deployment. The army therefore distinguished between remounts with and without training. Whilst young horses could undergo full remount training in peacetime, older horses that were already broken in and trained could be deployed immediately in the event of war. This procedure enabled the authorities to avoid the enormous costs of maintaining full war strength in the squadrons on a permanent basis, whilst efficiency was maintained through a stable core stock.

== Pay ==
The salary system for officers in the British Army was introduced in 1797 and remained largely unchanged throughout the 19th century. For most officers, their pay was not so much a wage in the true sense of the word, but rather a subsidy to enable them to perform their duties – especially as long as the purchase of ranks and promotions was common practice. In fact, officers, especially those in prestigious regiments such as the Foot Guards, Life Guards or Horse Guards, were dependent on substantial private income to cover the numerous expenses associated with their rank.

The pay of officers varied according to rank, branch of service and location. In 1815, a lieutenant colonel in the Life Guards received 31 shillings per day, in the cavalry 23 shillings, in the infantry 17 shillings and in the mounted artillery 18 shillings and one penny. The daily pay of captains ranged from 16 shillings in the Life Guards to 10 shillings 6 pence in the infantry, while lieutenants received between 11 shillings (Life Guards) and 6 shillings 6 pence (infantry). In the mid-19th century, the annual salary of officers in the Royal Horse Guards ranged from £94 for a lieutenant to £427 for a lieutenant colonel, while in the line infantry, lieutenants received £41, captains £106, majors £189 and lieutenant colonels £265 per year. Staff officers were better paid: a general received £2,920 per year, a lieutenant general £2,007, a major general £1,095, a brigadier general £912 and a colonel £730.

Despite these salaries, officers' incomes were regularly supplemented – or even offset – by various allowances. For example, there was an equipment allowance of £150 for officers in the cavalry and mounted artillery, and £100 in other branches of the armed forces, to offset the considerable initial costs of uniforms and equipment. In addition, there were allowances for servants, family allowances with fixed daily rates for wives and children (both at home and abroad), and a food allowance of 6 pence per day in lieu of rations. Officers on foreign service were entitled to a colonial allowance, and those who had horses to care for received a feed allowance – originally 1 shilling 10 pence per day, reduced to 1 shilling 2 pence from 1883. Further support was provided in the form of housing and travel allowances and compensation for fuel and lighting. Each unit also received a small annual amount for minor purchases and equipment, for example £2 5 shillings for each battery of the Royal Artillery or company of the Royal Engineers and 26 shillings for each infantry company. Officers' messes and regimental libraries benefited from additional subsidies, and a so-called ‘contingent allowance’ was provided for various minor expenses..

Another financial model for officers was the ‘half-pay’ system. Officers not on active duty could be placed on the half-pay list and thus receive a reduced income, which was intended to keep them available for possible re-employment. In practice, however, half-pay was often used as a kind of partial retirement, with at least three years of active service required after 1830. Even with all these allowances, however, the cost of being an officer was usually higher than the official salary. Officers had to pay for the officers' mess and the regimental band, uniforms and often lost allowances, as well as the capital loss incurred in acquiring their rank. Before the Crimean War, it was generally accepted that a private income of £50 to £100 per year was essential for any officer below the rank of major. Non-commissioned officers and enlisted men were hardly better off. The minimum wage for a private was about one shilling a day, cavalrymen received slightly more, as did guardsmen. However, these figures were misleading, as numerous deductions – for food, clothing, laundry, medical care, repairs and replacement of lost equipment – greatly reduced the actual remaining income. In 1890, for example, a private soldier was left with little more than £10 per year after all deductions.

== Living conditions ==
At the beginning of the 19th century, barracks in Great Britain and Ireland varied considerably in quality and size. Some were old fortresses or castles, others were the result of hasty construction work during the Napoleonic Wars, and most were small, poorly equipped, and unable to accommodate an entire regiment. Regional differences were pronounced: barracks in the south of England were generally better than those in the north, where soldiers were often housed in more difficult conditions in industrial cities. Of the 146 barracks in Great Britain, 89 did not have facilities where soldiers could wash, and 77 had no facilities for washing clothes. In Ireland, the situation was even more serious: 105 barracks had no separate washing rooms for clothes and 130 for men, with these deficiencies exacerbated by overcrowding. In Scotland, the minimum space allocated to each soldier was 5.5 m² – 0.9 m² less than what was allowed for poor people in workhouses. Even this regulation was often ignored, with many barracks providing only 3.5 m² per man. Overcrowding led to poor ventilation, resulting in unhealthy, foul-smelling air and higher rates of disease. The lack of concern for soldiers' health, coupled with financial constraints and limited medical knowledge, meant that hygiene and health care were often neglected. Conditions overseas were often even worse, as soldiers there were exposed to unknown diseases, extreme climatic conditions, and an unreliable water supply.

Marriage was subject to strict regulations; only six out of every hundred soldiers were allowed to marry “at the expense of the army,” which gave them the right to live in barracks, receive army rations, and send their children to regimental schools. However, only twenty of the 251 stations surveyed in 1857 provided separate accommodation for married couples, so most married couples were forced to share communal accommodation with other soldiers and often had to witness the birth of their children in these public conditions. Life was even more difficult for those who married “outside the force”: wives were denied access to the barracks, received no separation allowance, and were not allowed to accompany their husbands abroad, so they were often left to fend for themselves and had to work as seamstresses, maids, or, in the worst cases, on the streets.

The terrible state of the barracks and its effect on the health of soldiers could not be ignored in the mid-19th century. In 1860, 37% of ordinary soldiers were admitted to hospital because of illnesses that were directly caused by their living conditions, such as tuberculosis and fever. After the Crimean War, reports from special committees and a Royal Commission underlined the need for better conditions. They suggested that married soldiers should have their own space, with separate dining and recreation rooms, good washrooms, better ventilation, and better heating and lighting. The government then spent more money on maintaining and expanding barracks. They also made some changes, like building separate housing for married soldiers and improving the water supply, sewage system, and kitchens.

However, progress was slow and varied greatly. The sheer scale of the problem—over 250 barracks housing nearly 100,000 men—combined with high renovation costs and reluctance to invest, meant that improvements were made only gradually. Many barracks remained outdated, poorly located, and unsuitable for the growing needs of a modern army. Even as public health standards improved and civilian expectations changed, military accommodations often lagged behind, with government action typically triggered only by public scandals or urgent necessity. Comprehensive modernization of the barracks required not just maintenance and repairs, but a fundamental rethinking of their design and standards—a challenge that was not fully met even by the turn of the 20th century.

Despite these obstacles, there were clear improvements in the health of the regular army between 1856 and 1899. By the end of the century, soldiers’ health was comparable to that of the civilian population. Nevertheless, as the army remained largely a separate institution, the specific conditions of military service—its environment, diet, and clothing—differed significantly from civilian life and required ongoing review and reform. The experiences of soldiers in the Victorian era thus reflect both the hardships of military life, and the gradual, often hard-won improvements in living conditions brought about by reforms, advocacy, and a changing understanding of health and hygiene.

=== Diet ===
The official army ration, introduced in 1813 and remaining largely unchanged for half a century, consisted of one pound of bread and three-quarters of a pound of meat per man per day. Until the mid-19th century, this basic ration was sometimes supplemented at regimental level with vegetables, spices, tea, and butter, for which soldiers paid extra, deducted from their pay. Soldiers could also supplement their diet by purchasing additional meals in barracks canteens or from local merchants, but for many, bread, meat, and potatoes remained the main components of their daily diet. Meals were usually served in three portions: breakfast with bread and tea in the morning, lunch with beef and potatoes, and a light supper with tea and leftover bread. The simplicity and monotony of this diet was compounded by inadequate cooking facilities, which were usually limited to a large copper kettle, so that beef and potatoes were almost always boiled. After cooking and deboning, the meat often shrank to a tough, stringy mass that weighed barely half as much as it had originally, making it difficult to eat and hardly enough to satisfy hunger. Many soldiers, dissatisfied with the army’s rations, had their meals prepared at their own expense, bought additional food, or simply went hungry, sometimes satisfying their appetites with tobacco or beer.

In 1857, the Military Medical Commission investigated the army’s diet. It found that an unbalanced diet was leading to poor health among the troops. Although there was little scientific knowledge about nutrition and vitamins at the time, the Commission recommended a varied diet and improved cooking facilities. Based on these recommendations, reforms were gradually implemented: starting in 1858, modern kitchens were introduced in many barracks, and in 1870, a cooking school for army cooks was founded in Aldershot. However, these improvements were implemented inconsistently, with the quality and quantity of rations varying considerably from regiment to regiment, largely depending on the interest and competence of the commanding officers. It was not until 1900 that the staple foods—bread and meat—were changed, although an allowance for vegetables, spices, and other ingredients had already been introduced in 1857.

The regimental system of procuring additional food led to inequalities in nutrition, with some units enjoying rich and varied meals while others continued to suffer from bland and unimaginative food. Criticism of army catering was widespread, and many soldiers spent a large part of their pay on supplementing their rations with beer and food from outside sources. Reports and lectures in the second half of the 19th century repeatedly highlighted the inadequacies and shortcomings of the army's standard rations and frequently called for improvements.

In peacetime, the daily ration was three-quarters of a pound of meat and a pound of bread, plus a small amount of oil, groceries, and vegetables for every eighteen men. In wartime, the ration increased to one and a half pounds of bread or a pound of biscuits, sixteen ounces of fresh meat (or two ounces of salted meat as a substitute) with rice, sugar, coffee or tea, salt, spirits, and, if available, vegetables. The so-called “iron ration,” introduced towards the end of the 19th century and especially during the Second Boer War, consisted of preserved or concentrated meat (often “bully beef”), hard biscuits, cocoa or chocolate, and sometimes bouillon or meat extract. This compact, durable packaging was designed as a survival ration for 24 to 36 hours, not as a balanced, long-term diet.

While reforms in the food service system gradually led to improved standards in barracks kitchens—such as improved meat inspections, revised contracts, and smaller loaves of bread—soldiers continued to complain about the quality and quantity of their food. Many recalled the hunger they had to endure, especially at night, and the monotony of the cooked meals remained a cause for complaint. Nevertheless, the regular supply of meals, combined with physical activity and life in the fresh air, led to measurable improvements in the health of the recruits, as evidenced by a significant increase in height, chest size, and weight in the first months of their service.

Despite these advances, the basic structures of army life and nutrition remained largely unchanged during the Victorian era. Soldiers rose early, performed routine tasks and hard labor, ate at set times, and had limited leisure time, with their daily rations providing nutrition but offering little enjoyment. Improvements in rations and living conditions did not necessarily make military service more attractive, but they did contribute to better health and lower mortality rates among soldiers, especially when compared to the urban poor from whom the army was largely recruited. Nevertheless, although the diet of the Victorian army represented a significant improvement over earlier times and the lot of many civilians, it remained monotonous, repetitive, and often inadequate, so that many soldiers sought variety and satisfaction outside the barracks walls.

== Punishment ==
Discipline in the British Army during the nineteenth century was notoriously harsh, particularly before flogging was outlawed in 1881. Flogging was central to enforcing discipline in the early 1800s, and courts-martial had broad authority over punishments. Limits on the number of lashes were gradually introduced: by 1829, regimental courts could order up to 300 lashes and district or general courts up to 500. These numbers were reduced over time, and by 1836, the maximums were 100, 150, and 200 lashes, depending on the court.

Floggings, often held at dawn before assembled troops, were intended to serve as a warning to others. The condemned soldier was stripped, tied to a post, and whipped with a cat-o’-nine-tails—a whip with nine knotted cords. The spectacle often provoked anger and disgust among witnesses. While conservatives defended flogging for serious offenses like mutiny, desertion, and theft, alternative punishments such as imprisonment became more common as the century went on. By the 1840s, military prisons were built, and the use of flogging declined, becoming limited to only the gravest offenses before being abolished in 1881.

Branding, another form of corporal punishment, was also used but became increasingly controversial. Soldiers convicted of desertion or having a “bad character” were tattooed with identifying letters. This practice was justified as a way to prevent repeat offenses but was ended in 1871. Despite these punishments, crime remained a problem in the army, with thousands court-martialed each year, though both the rate and severity of punishment declined as the century progressed. Drunkenness was common and after 1868 was usually punished by fines rather than harsher measures. Desertion rates fluctuated but remained a persistent issue.

Imprisonment also became more widespread, with hundreds to thousands of soldiers in military prisons annually. The death penalty was reserved for the most serious crimes, such as treason or murder, and between 1865 and 1898, 37 soldiers were executed. By the end of the nineteenth century, army discipline remained strict but punishments were less brutal. Commanders could impose short terms of imprisonment or confinement for lesser offenses, and deductions from pay were used for infractions like drunkenness or being absent without leave. Noncommissioned officers could only be demoted by court-martial, and officers, while subject to arrest, were not directly punished by their commanders.

== Medical service ==
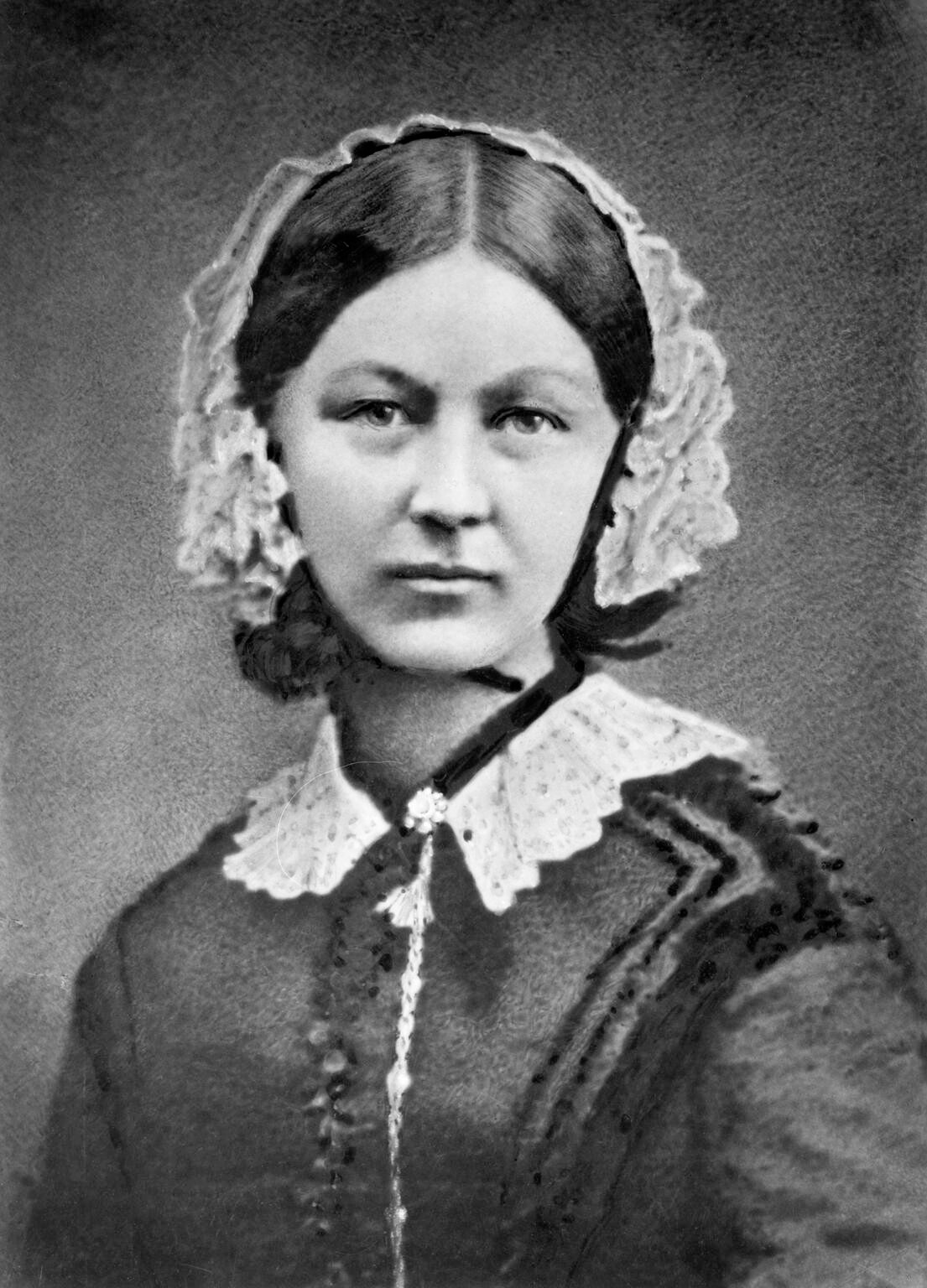
Florence Nightingale c. 1860

At the beginning of the Victorian era, the British Army's medical service was rudimentary and poorly organized. Most regiments relied almost exclusively on their own medical officer, who was often a civilian surgeon paid from regimental funds and sometimes assisted by one or two assistants. There were no formal arrangements for stretcher bearers or organized ambulance services. Musicians were expected to assist in caring for the wounded, but in practice, the evacuation of the wounded from the battlefield depended on the ad hoc hiring of civilian transport such as wagons or carts. This improvised system proved to be completely inadequate, as became clear during the Crimean War.

During the Crimean War, attempts to establish a special transport corps for hospitals made up of retired soldiers fell far short of what was needed. Transporting the wounded was often an agonizing ordeal, requiring long marches or journeys by ox cart from the front in Sevastopol to the supply base in Balaklava and then on to the main hospital in Scutari on the Bosporus, 300 miles away. Conditions in Scutari were appalling: the hospital, built for 1,000 men, was severely overcrowded and there was a chronic shortage of beds, furniture, blankets, and medical supplies. Sanitary conditions were catastrophic, with clogged latrines, overflowing urine buckets, and amputations performed in crowded wards. The result was a catastrophic mortality rate. Figures from January 1855 show that of 2,350 patients, 2,315 died – a mortality rate of almost 98.5 percent.

The arrival of Florence Nightingale and her team of 38 nurses in November 1854 marked a turning point. Despite fierce local resistance and initial restrictions to simple nursing tasks, Nightingale introduced crucial reforms in hygiene and patient care and improved food supplies (partly at her own expense). The effects were dramatic: the mortality rate fell from 44 percent when she arrived to just 2.2 percent within six months. Nightingale's work laid the foundation for later reforms, but progress in the medical field was slow and gradual. In response to the lessons learned from the situation in Crimea, the Army Medical School was founded in 1860 and, at the request of Queen Victoria, the Royal Military Hospital was established in Netley. In the 1860s, additional convalescent homes were built in Woolwich and Cambridge. The Army Hospital Corps, founded in 1857 to provide nurses and stretcher bearers, remained without its own officers for many years, as all doctors continued to be subordinate to the regiments.

It was not until 1873 that military doctors were transferred to the Army Medical Department, which represented a significant step toward a centralized and more professional medical service. In the following decades, the care of wounded and sick soldiers improved significantly. The campaigns of the 1870s and 1880s highlighted the dedication and bravery of medical personnel in the field, such as surgeon Reynolds, who worked under fire at Rorke's Drift, and Corporal J. J. Farmer, who continued to care for the wounded at Majuba even after suffering gunshot wounds to both arms. Medics were increasingly found in forward positions, and their role became more important to the operational effectiveness of the army.

After the Egyptian campaign, a parliamentary commission recommended merging the Army Medical Department and the Army Hospital Corps into a single organization. Although this reform initially met with resistance, it was finally implemented in June 1898 with the establishment of the Royal Army Medical Corps (RAMC) by royal decree. The RAMC was first deployed during Kitchener's Sudan campaign and played a central role in providing medical care during the Boer War. Despite initial staff shortages—850 officers, forty non-commissioned officers, 240 sergeants, and 2,000 other soldiers were sent to South Africa—these numbers quickly proved insufficient given the scale of the conflict. The army supplemented its resources with 700 civilian surgeons, and by the end of the war, a total of 8,500 RAMC personnel and 800 volunteer nurses had served in the field.

The RAMC's capacity grew significantly during the Boer War, mobilizing an extensive medical infrastructure: 151 staff and regimental companies, nineteen medical companies, twenty-eight field hospitals, five stationary hospitals, sixteen general hospitals, three hospital trains, two hospital ships, and five supply depots, which were further reinforced by local South African volunteer units. By the end of the Victorian era, the British Army's medical service had transformed from a loosely organized and often inadequate system into a large, professional, and increasingly effective organization capable of supporting the army's worldwide operations and meeting the demands of modern warfare.

== Organization ==
=== Cavalry ===
By the 1890s, the British cavalry was organized on a self-sufficient regimental basis, similar to how infantry regiments of a single battalion had previously been structured. Each cavalry regiment was composed of four squadrons, with no central depot or dependence on other regiments for recruits, horses, or supplies. Recruitment and remounting were handled internally, with new men and horses joining directly at regimental headquarters. The British cavalry was formally divided into three categories: heavy, medium, and light. The heavy cavalry comprised five regiments, including the 1st and 2nd Life Guards, the Royal Horse Guards, the 1st Royal Dragoons, and the 2nd Dragoons (Scots Greys). Medium cavalry included thirteen regiments, which encompassed all Dragoon Guards, Lancer regiments, and the 6th Inniskilling Dragoons. The light cavalry also consisted of thirteen regiments, all designated as hussars. Altogether, these thirty-one regiments amounted to 124 squadrons, which were distributed for service across Great Britain, India, and the colonies.

A significant development in regimental organization was the adoption of the squadron system in 1892, a structure already common among European armies. While earlier attempts in 1869 and 1870 had been short-lived, the system now divided regiments into four squadrons, each functioning as a substantial unit under a single experienced commander, usually a major or a senior captain, assisted by a junior captain and several subalterns. This replaced the former troop system, where smaller units were independently managed, often resulting in uneven experience and authority among officers. The squadron commander was responsible for discipline, equipment, and supplies, reporting directly to the regimental colonel, and supported by an administrative staff. Each squadron was further divided into three or four troops, each under its own officers and non-commissioned officers, with men and horses kept together as stable units both in barracks and in the field. The regimental staff oversaw the collective functioning of all four squadrons, while individual squadron commanders managed their own cash and stores through the regimental system.

By the late nineteenth century, the traditional distinctions in function between heavy and light cavalry had largely disappeared. The limited number of regular cavalry regiments, scattered across the Empire on various duties, meant that all regiments were expected to fulfill the full range of cavalry roles, from reconnaissance to shock action. Regulations as early as 1844 required that all cavalry regiments be capable of performing any necessary function, regardless of their designated type. Despite minor differences in the size of men and horses among the heavy, medium, and light cavalry, the practical demands of imperial service led to a convergence in their organization and duties. Attempts at significant reform, such as those by Secretaries of State for War Edward Cardwell and Hugh Childers, were met with resistance and had little lasting impact on the cavalry’s regimental structure, which remained distinct from that of the infantry and retained its traditional numbering even through periods of broader military reorganization. By 1899, efforts to reduce the weight carried by cavalry horses had achieved modest success, but the essential character and organization of the cavalry regiments remained consistent until after the First World War.

=== Infantry ===
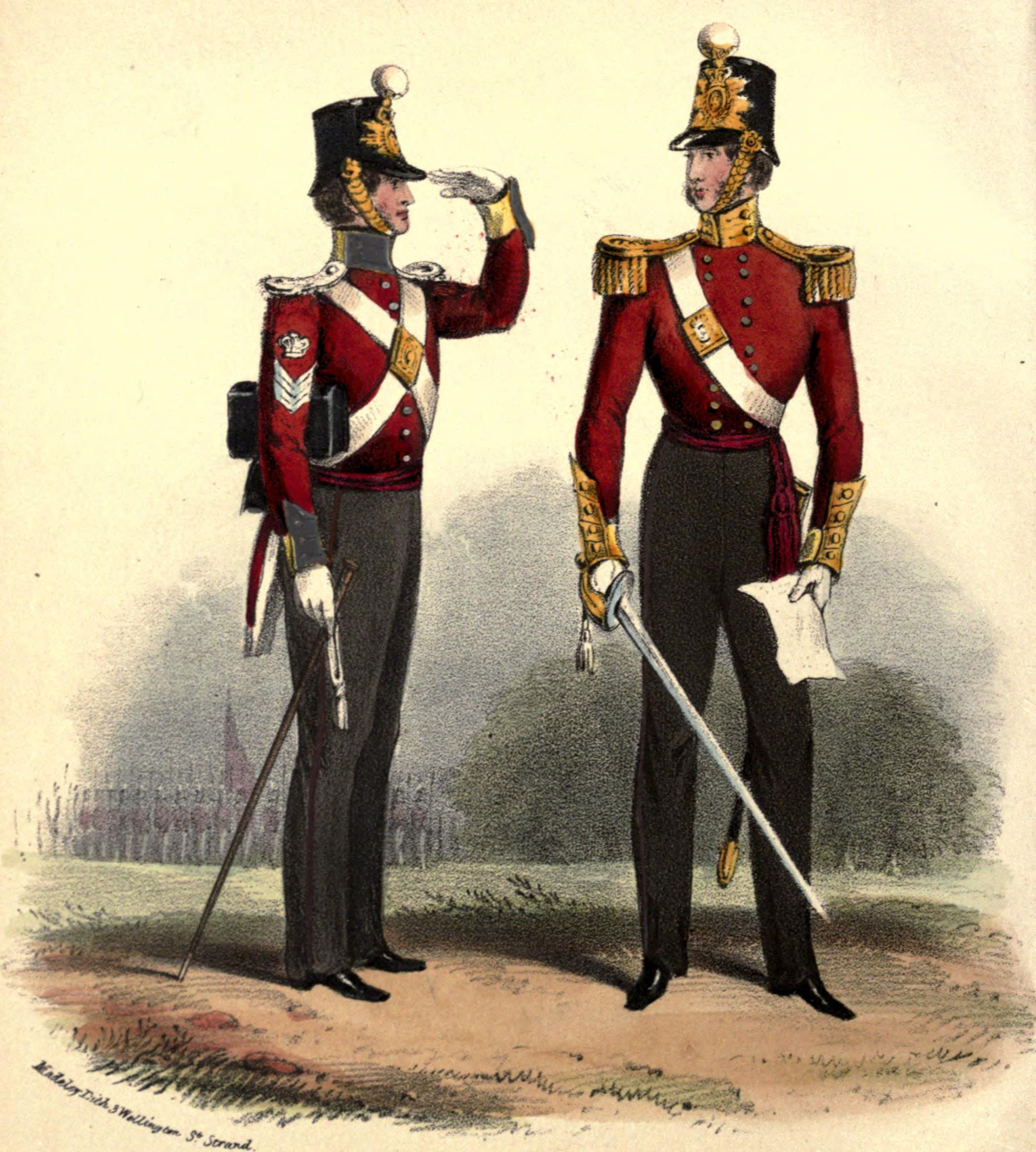
Colour Sergeant and officer of the 12th Foot (the Suffolk Regiment), 1840s Note the left handed salute. The Army did not adopt saluting with the right hand only, until 1917.

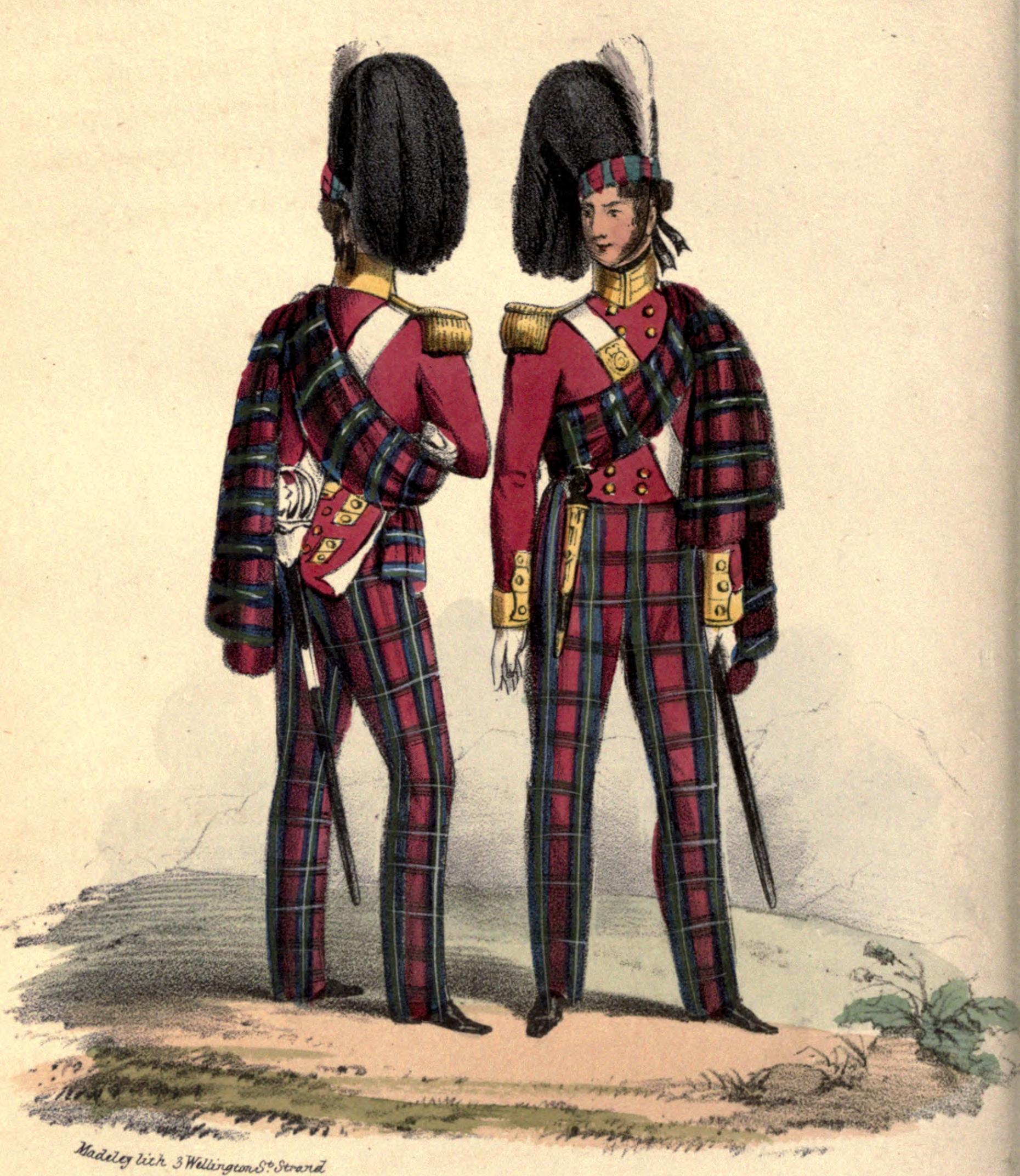
Officers of the 72nd Foot (the Duke of Albany's own Highlanders), 1840s

Although they were introduced during the Napoleonic Wars, corps and divisions were generally temporary military units that were set up specifically for the duration of a major conflict (e.g., Crimean War, Boer War). In peacetime, they were not permanent, standing units. Therefore, the regiment, which consisted of one or more battalions, was the most important autonomous tactical unit. During the 19th century, the structure and size of British infantry battalions underwent significant changes. After the Napoleonic Wars, most regiments were reduced to single-battalion formations, with most battalions reduced to 697 men, including officers. From 1822 onwards, a distinction was made between battalions in Asia and those in other parts of the Empire. The battalions deployed in Asia had a strength of 1,071 men and were divided into ten companies—nine for overseas service and one recruitment company in the United Kingdom. Battalions stationed elsewhere usually comprised 654 men divided into eight companies.

It proved difficult to maintain battalions abroad at full strength, mainly due to the lack of an effective depot system in the home country. To solve this problem, in 1825 the infantry battalions were increased to ten companies, divided into six operational companies and four depot companies. The operational contingent consisted of a lieutenant colonel, a major, six captains, eight lieutenants, four second lieutenants, a surgeon with an assistant, four sergeant majors, thirty-six sergeants, twenty-four corporals, twelve drummers, and 516 privates—a total of six companies, each with eighty-six privates and the corresponding officers and noncommissioned officers. The depot, often referred to as the depot battalion, comprised one major, four captains, four lieutenants, four second lieutenants, one surgeon, twenty-six sergeants, twenty-six corporals, eight drummers, and 224 privates, divided into four companies of fifty-six privates each.

To overcome personnel shortages, the battalions were reinforced with five privates per company in 1839–1840. In 1841, the army had seventy-eight battalions abroad, six en route to or from their destinations, and nineteen stationed in the United Kingdom. During the Crimean War in 1854, the infantry of the British expeditionary force—including three Guards battalions—was organized into four infantry divisions and one light division, with each division consisting of two brigades of three battalions each. At that time, the battalions were expanded to sixteen companies—eight operational and eight depot companies—and thus had practically double the strength of a standard battalion. However, by June of the same year, the number of depot companies had been reduced to four again.

The Indian uprising of 1857–1859 led to further adjustments: Regiments 10 to 25 were each required to establish a second battalion consisting of ten operational companies and two depot companies, comprising a total of around 1,000 men. The Cardwell Reform of 1872 brought significant changes, combining single-battalion regiments in pairs and assigning them to specific regions in the United Kingdom. Each regiment was assigned a depot, and in the case of two-battalion regiments, one battalion served at home while the other was stationed abroad. This arrangement remained essentially unchanged until the end of the 19th century.

The target strength of a battalion now depended on whether it was intended for foreign deployment. For the first eighteen battalions, the strength was set at 820 men, for the next eighteen at 620, and for all others at 520. As there were no formal reserves, these figures demonstrated the practical necessity of ensuring there were always enough soldiers available for foreign deployments. In 1881, all regiments were divided into two battalions. The first twenty-five regiments remained unchanged, while the rest were combined in pairs to form the first and second battalions of the new regiments. Each regiment also had a third and fourth battalion, which consisted of militias, as well as a volunteer battalion. Each operational battalion then consisted of a staff and eight companies, each with about one hundred soldiers. Each company, commanded by a captain, was divided into two half-companies, each commanded by a non-commissioned officer. Each half-company was further divided into two sections.

=== Artillery and Engineers ===
Since 1793, the Royal Artillery had been divided into the mounted artillery (Royal Horse Artillery) and the regular field artillery (Royal Foot Artillery). The official separation between field and fortress artillery, which gave rise to the Royal Field Artillery and the Royal Garrison Artillery, was not introduced until 1899 and remained in place until 1924. As a rule, the batteries consisted of six guns and the associated vehicles, although there were exceptions: in the 1890s, batteries were equipped with six 9-pounder muzzle-loading guns and six 12-pounder breech-loading guns, while batteries with 13-pounder muzzle-loading guns had only four guns per battery. Originally, batteries were named after their commanders, but later on, letter and number designations were used. Within sixty years, there were up to seven changes to this system, but in 1889 it was simplified: mounted batteries were given letters, while the much more numerous field batteries were given numbers. In 1862, the artillery units of the East India Company were integrated into the Royal Artillery without forming a separate branch. However, the Royal Artillery's mountain batteries were not included in the numbered sequence of field batteries, but retained their own numbering. The Royal Artillery reached its peak in 1872 with almost 35,000 men spread across twenty-nine brigades.

In 1898, the artillery consisted of 21 mounted batteries (designated with the letters A to U), 103 planned field batteries (numbered from 1 to 103, ten of which had not yet been established) and ten mountain batteries (numbered from 1 to 10), as well as depots for mounted and field artillery. Ammunition columns and parks were intended as reserves and could be mobilized in the event of war. The strength of the units varied depending on the situation. The fortress artillery was divided into eastern, southern, and western divisions according to geographical considerations, with each division consisting of several companies. Originally, 40 companies were planned for British garrisons, 37 for colonies, and 27 for India. The militia artillery, which was formed at the time of the Crimean War, ultimately comprised 32 battalions, each with four to eight companies, distributed among the three fortress artillery divisions. The volunteer artillery ultimately consisted of 65 units ranging in strength from one to seventeen companies and intended solely for homeland defense, with some specially trained as fortress artillery.

The Corps of Engineers and the Royal Regiment of Artillery became separate organizations in 1716. In 1787, the Engineers were granted the "Royal" title, and their officers became known as Royal Engineers. That same year, soldier artificers formed the Corps of Royal Military Artificers, which was renamed the Corps of Royal Sappers and Miners in 1812. After the Ordnance Department was dissolved in 1855, control of the Royal Engineers and Royal Artillery shifted to the commander in chief in 1856, and the Sappers and Miners were merged into the Royal Engineers. The inspector-general of fortifications, a high-ranking officer, led the Royal Engineers within the War Office, overseeing the corps at both national and district levels. Each military district had a senior Royal Engineer known as the Commanding Royal Engineer (C.R.E.), who managed subdistrict operations.

By 1899, the Royal Engineers included a variety of specialized units: one bridging battalion, one telegraph battalion, a mounted detachment field depot, two field parks and a training depot, one balloon section, eight field companies, eighteen fortress companies, two railway companies, twelve submarine mining companies, a coast battalion, four survey companies, and eight depot companies. Each unit had specific technical roles. During wartime, a field company supported each infantry division, and a mounted detachment assisted each cavalry division. Corps-level engineer support included a field company, pontoon company, telegraph staff and sections, a field park, a railway company, and a balloon section.

As of 1899, a Royal Engineer field company in wartime comprised 6 officers, 8 sergeants, and 197 men, while a mounted detachment had 4 officers, 7 sergeants, and 116 men. In 1861, Royal Engineers made up 2% of the British Army’s 221,604 personnel. By 1899, they accounted for 3.6% of an army of 224,609, with 905 officers (385 stationed in India). On 1 October 1899, 694 Royal Engineers were serving in South Africa. The Second Boer War required over 7,000 engineers, plus about 1,500 militia and volunteer engineers.

=== Volunteer movement ===
The fears of French invasion and concerns about the relatively small size of Britain’s regular army in 1859 led to the formation of locally organized Volunteer Rifle and Artillery Corps, made up of civilian part-time soldiers who trained in their spare time and were often responsible for providing their own equipment and uniforms. The Volunteer units were not part of the regular army and were primarily intended for home defense, with members not obligated to serve overseas. The movement attracted widespread public participation, particularly from the middle and upper classes, and promoted a spirit of national service and patriotism.

In 1862, the volunteers could muster 134,000 riflemen in 200 battalions, 24,000 artillery gunners, 2,900 engineers and a small contingent of mounted troops. The Volunteer Act 1863 (26 & 27 Vict. c. 65) formally organised the volunteers and laid down their terms of service. They were responsible to the Lord-lieutenant of the county in which they were raised. In contrast to the upper-class values of the officers of the regular army, that of the Volunteer's officers and many of the lower ranks was urban and middle-class. Rather than the Army's scarlet infantry uniforms, many volunteer infantry units wore the dark green of the rifle regiments or later adopted the grey uniforms of American volunteers. For their part, regular officers were pleased to have nothing to do with the volunteers' citizen soldiers and officers.

=== Plans ===
In the late 19th century, the British Army made several attempts to create an effective mobilization plan for its home and expeditionary forces. The 1875 plan organized the army into eight corps, each with dedicated staff and headquarters, and included assembly points for reservists and logistical centers. However, while there were enough regular and auxiliary infantry, there were not enough cavalry, artillery, or support troops to fully staff the eight corps. This limitation became clear during a disorganized partial mobilization exercise in 1876, leading to the abandonment of the scheme by 1881.

Traditionally, when an expeditionary force was needed overseas, the British Army would quickly assemble available units into provisional brigades and send them off, a system that worked only for small colonial engagements. The shortcomings of this ad hoc approach were highlighted after the 1882 expedition to Egypt, the Gordon Relief Expedition (1884–1885), and the 1885 war scare with Russia. In response, Major General Sir Henry Brackenbury, as director of military intelligence, systematically reviewed available forces and developed a more realistic mobilization plan. His proposal prioritized home defense and colonial garrisons, then organized the remaining regular troops into two army corps and a cavalry division, complete with necessary supply and support elements. This plan, although controversial for exposing the Army’s lack of readiness and the need for greater resources, gained official support and became the foundation of the 1888 Stanhope Memorandum.

The Stanhope Memorandum, authored by Secretary of State for War Edward Stanhope, set out that after providing for garrisons and India, the Army should be able to mobilize three corps for home defense—two regular and one partly militia, each with three divisions. Only after meeting these commitments could two corps be considered for overseas deployment, which is a sign of a more pragmatic and prioritized approach to British military readiness in the late Victorian era.

== Uniforms ==
During the Victorian era, the uniforms of officers and soldiers in the British Army reflected both tradition and a gradual adaptation to practical requirements and colonial service. Newly commissioned officers had to incur considerable expense, as they had to purchase their own uniforms, accessories and personal equipment. For an infantry officer, these initial costs amounted to around £200, while cavalry officers often spent between £600 and £1,000 due to the need for more elaborate uniforms, horse equipment and multiple warhorses. By the end of the 19th century, infantry officers' uniforms closely resembled those of the enlisted men, but differed in details such as gold embroidery on collars and trimmings. Less formal attire included blue serge coats and caps, similar to those worn by the enlisted men. Rank insignia were uniform: lieutenants had plain shoulder straps, first lieutenants wore one star (or ‘pip’) and captains wore two. Staff officers wore a crown, lieutenant colonels wore one star and colonels wore two. Later reforms provided for one, two and three stars for lieutenants, first lieutenants and captains respectively.

For ordinary soldiers, the red jacket, tight trousers and characteristic headgear – such as the shako – remained largely unchanged from Waterloo to the Crimean War. Uniforms and equipment were originally provided by individual regiments, which sometimes led to cost savings and poor quality. Soldiers were issued with both a ceremonial ‘parade uniform’ and a more practical ‘dress uniform’ for daily service. Equipment was expected to last for specific periods: coats and boots for one year, overcoats for three years, and other items of equipment for up to twelve years. Subsequent replacements were deducted from the soldiers' pay. The Crimean War led to major changes. The restrictive uniform jacket was replaced by a looser tunic, and trousers became more comfortable. British soldiers in India often dyed their summer uniforms khaki – derived from the Urdu word for dust – to make them more practical and better camouflaged. Campaigns in Africa and Asia led to more functional uniforms, including loose-fitting coats and lightweight pith helmets.

From the 1870s onwards, field uniforms continued to evolve: soldiers were issued with khaki jackets and trousers as well as pith helmets for overseas deployment. In 1881, national colours replaced many regimental distinctions, and khaki uniforms gradually replaced the red tunic as the field uniform. By 1897, khaki was the standard dress for overseas service and, from 1902, also at home. Service in the colonies influenced further adaptations. Uniforms were often made from lighter or unlined materials and adapted to local conditions, with regiments sometimes dyeing helmets and belts for camouflage. The impracticality of European-style clothing in tropical climates led to experimentation with new materials and colours, eventually making khaki the norm for field uniforms outside Europe. While the traditional red tunic was retained for ceremonial purposes and because of its perceived psychological effect on enemies, by the end of the Victorian era it had been almost completely replaced in the field by more practical and less conspicuous clothing.

== Equipment ==
=== Infantry ===
The flintlock musket, commonly known as the Brown Bess, was the standard weapon of the British infantry for decades. However, after comparative tests in Woolwich in 1834, in which the percussion lock—an invention of Reverend Alexander John Forsyth—proved to be clearly superior to the older flintlock mechanism, the Board of Ordnance decided to equip the entire army with percussion weapons. A devastating fire in the Tower of London in 1841 destroyed many of the muskets intended for conversion, making it necessary to develop a new weapon, the Model 1842 musket. This percussion musket was produced in several barrel lengths for infantry, artillery, and cavalry and standardized the caliber within the various branches of the armed forces for the first time, which greatly simplified the supply of ammunition.

Another innovation of that period was the Brunswick rifle, which was introduced in 1836 after testing. Despite its theoretical advantages, the rifle was difficult to load and not very accurate, which is why it was only used to a limited extent by rifle regiments. In the mid-19th century, the Minié rifle was introduced, which used a conical bullet that expanded when fired, thus making better use of the rifling in the barrel. Although it was still a muzzle-loader, it offered significant improvements in range and accuracy over the previous smoothbore muskets and was used by the majority of the British infantry during the Crimean War. However, the Minié rifle was soon replaced by the Enfield rifle model 1853. This weapon, with a caliber of 14.6 and a weight of just under 4 kilograms, became the standard infantry weapon from the late 1850s onwards. Its improved accuracy, range, and reliability were highly valued; it was effective in combat at distances of up to 1,100 meters.

Shortly thereafter, the Lancaster rifle with an oval barrel profile was introduced in limited numbers, primarily to the Royal Engineers. At the same time, the army began testing various breech-loading carbines, including models from Westley Richards, Terry, Sharps, and Greene. The British Westley Richards carbine became the standard cavalry weapon in 1861. Experience with breech-loading rifles in European conflicts, particularly with the Prussian needle rifle, demonstrated the superiority of this technology over muzzle-loading rifles. The British Army therefore began converting its Enfield rifles to the breech-loading system developed by Jacob Snider. The Snider–Enfield rifle was introduced in the 1860s and used a side-opening block lock and a centerfire cartridge, which significantly accelerated the rate of fire and reloading. However, this conversion was only a temporary solution. After extensive testing, the Martini–Henry rifle was introduced in 1871. The rifle had a drop block breech, a caliber of 11.43 millimeters, and used a black powder cartridge with a brass casing. The weapon was robust, quick to reload, and very accurate at ranges of up to 900 yards (820 m), but was known for its strong recoil and overheating during continuous use.

With technological advances in ammunition and propellants, the focus shifted to higher muzzle velocity and smaller calibers. Swiss engineer Eduard Rubin developed the concept of smaller, copper-jacketed bullets and low-smoke powder, which resulted in a flatter trajectory and increased range. The British adopted this principle in the late 1880s and reduced the caliber to 7.7 millimeters. Initially, black powder was still used, but from 1892 onwards, cordite, a smokeless propellant developed by British chemists, became the norm. The culmination of this development was the introduction of the Lee–Metford rifle in 1888. The Lee–Metford was a repeating rifle with a magazine feed for 7.7 mm cartridges; the magazine initially held eight rounds, later ten.

The Lee–Enfield rifle replaced the Lee–Metford in 1895. The Lee–Enfield combined James Paris Lee's breech mechanism with a new barrel that featured rifling, making it more suitable for use with cordite. The standard model, the Magazine Lee–Enfield Mark I, had a ten-round magazine. The Lee–Enfield was characterized by its robustness, precision, high rate of fire, and reliability even under difficult conditions, and remained in service with the British Army in various versions from 1895 until well into the second half of the 20th century.

=== Cavalry ===
Between 1815 and 1853, saddles and bridles for both light and heavy cavalry remained largely unchanged. New saddle designs were introduced in 1856 with the Universal Wood Arch Saddle. In the period that followed, various designs were developed with the aim of replacing this model, though these proved inferior to the so-called Nolan saddle. The insights gained from these developments led to the construction of a saddle with wooden pommel, steel arches and a one-piece seat. The resulting 1890 model established itself as the standard saddle. Modifications to the original design led in 1898 to the Steel Arch Universal Pattern Saddle, 1890 Pattern, Mark III, which constituted the standard equipment at the outbreak of the Boer War.

The Mark III featured an adjustable V-girth, improved stirrup suspension and padding for the flaps, and was manufactured in four sizes to fit different horse backs. It was not until 1860 that the universal standard bridle was introduced. In 1885, this was replaced by a modified design which dispensed with the toggle on the bit, replacing it with a chain fastening. The breastplate was no longer attached directly to the saddle, but was fitted like a collar, with two straps connecting it to the pommel.From then on, tail straps were no longer used. Saddle bags, horseshoe bags and carabiner shoes were the same as the models previously in use. The coat bag along with saddlecloths and similar items became obsolete.

Both of the blade weapons introduced in 1796 for light and heavy cavalry were replaced in 1821 by the Pattern Heavy and Pattern Light Cavalry Swords. In 1853, the entire cavalry was equipped with the Pattern Universal Cavalry Sword, which combined the characteristics of a cutting and thrusting weapon in a straight, single-edged blade, thereby removing the previous distinction in equipment between light and heavy cavalry. This, in turn, was superseded by the cavalry sword models of 1864 and 1885. Ultimately, there were eight different models of bladed weapons over a period of 75 years. The experience with the French lancers during the Coalition Wars prompted the army to equip its light cavalry with lances as well. The introduction of the lance led to discussions regarding the lancers’ firearms, as the butts of the carbines hindered the free use of the lance.

Consequently, pistols became the primary firearm of the lance-bearer regiments, although some carbines were retained for guard duty. When pistols fell out of favour with the rest of the cavalry in 1842, a new model of percussion pistol was introduced for the lance-bearers. This weapon became the standard sidearm for non-commissioned officers and enlisted men until the introduction of the Enfield revolver in 1880.At the same time, the gradual introduction of more efficient breech-loading carbines had resolved the problems associated with muzzle-loaders. These included the Westley-Richards percussion carbine introduced in 1861, the Snider-Enfield carbine of 1866, and the Martini-Henry carbine of 1877.

=== Artillery ===
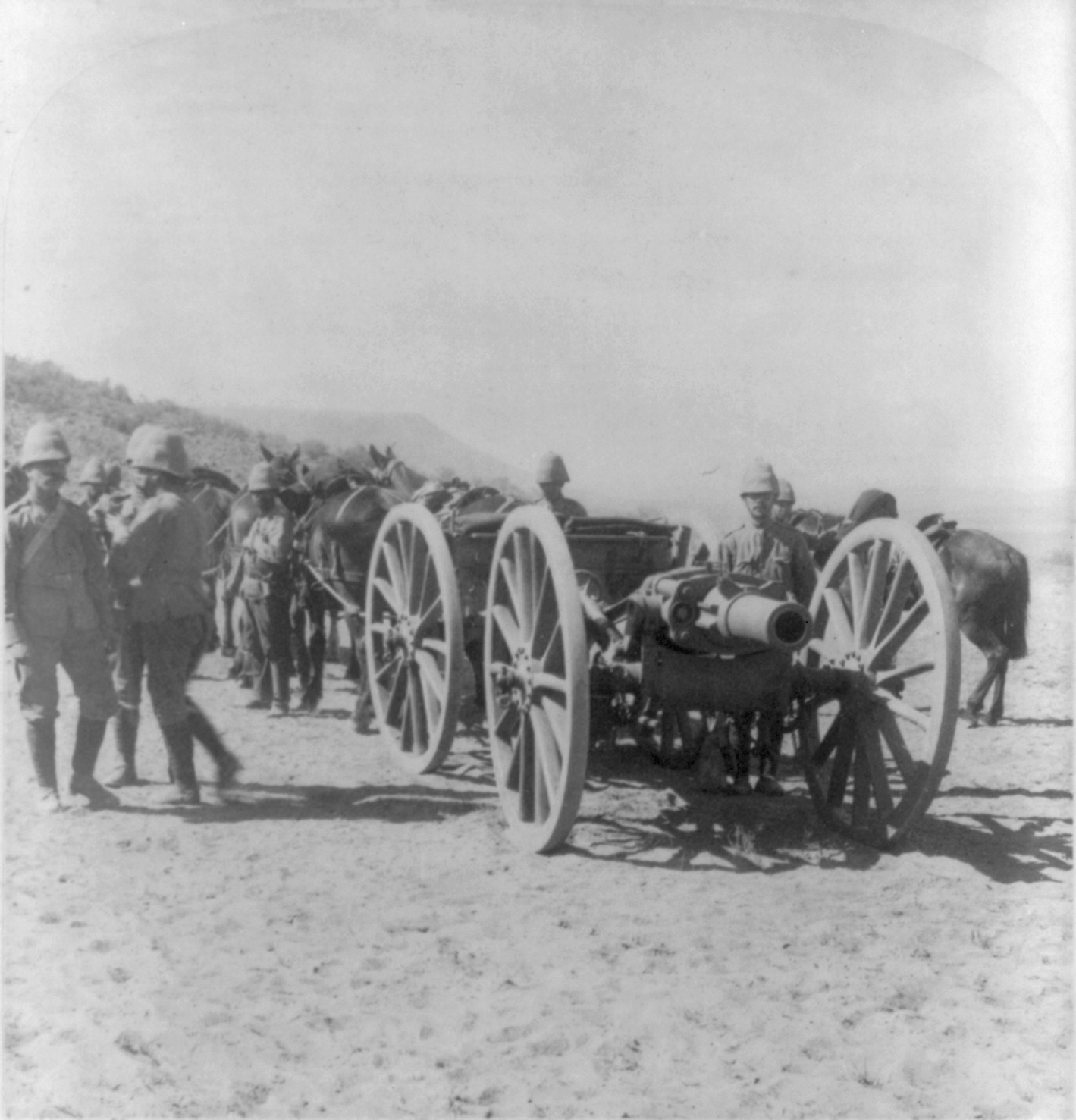
Royal Field Artillery 5-inch howitzer in the Northern Cape, in January 1900, during the Second Boer War

Until the middle of the century, institutional neglect meant that there was little development in artillery. By 1854, the army was essentially still equipped with the same muzzle-loading guns that had been used at Waterloo. Mounted artillery units usually had a mix of light 6-pounder cannons and 12-pounder howitzers, whilst field batteries mostly consisted of 9-pounder cannons and 24-pounder howitzers. The light 6-pounder cannon was the most important field gun of the time. It fired cannonballs with a range of up to 1,100 metres, used a powder charge of 14 pounds and achieved muzzle velocities of 457 to 518 metres per second. The 9-pounder cannon, with a 3-pound charge, had a slightly greater range of 1,300 metres. Heavier guns such as the 18-, 24- and 32-pounders, which were in continuous service from the early 18th century until 1860, were reserved for siege operations and were rarely used in the field. In addition, there were mortars with a calibre of 11 to 33 cm and a maximum range of up to 2,469 metres.

In the second half of the 19th century, conventional smoothbore cannons were gradually replaced by breech-loading guns. This development allowed for the use of elongated projectiles stabilised by rotation, which increased the range and accuracy of the guns. This led William Armstrong to develop a 12-pounder breech-loading cannon with a screw breech in 1858. High costs and immature technology, particularly with regard to the breech-loading system, led the army to continue using muzzle-loaders until 1881. In the late 1860s, the army standardised its artillery and introduced variants for mountain, field, siege, medium and heavy guns.

Coastal and fortress defences lagged behind field artillery in terms of modernisation and often relied on converted smoothbore guns. Nevertheless, by the late 1870s, new breech-loading guns began to replace these older guns, with the 13-pounder for mounted and field artillery and the 6.3 cm mountain gun representing significant advances in design. Artillery ammunition developed in parallel with the guns themselves. Throughout the era of smoothbore guns, round balls, and grapeshot were standard. Invented in the late 18th century by Lieutenant Henry Shrapnel and further developed in the 19th century, the Shrapnel shell became an important anti-personnel projectile that scattered balls at a predetermined point in its trajectory.

=== Engineers ===
The Royal Engineers’ most essential and adaptable units were the field company, assigned to each infantry division, and the mounted detachment, which accompanied each cavalry division. Both units were equipped to fulfill a broad range of engineering tasks on the battlefield. A typical field company included a support train consisting of four two-horse carts for entrenching tools, a one-horse medical cart, a mobile blacksmith, and two four-horse pontoon wagons. Additional carts, each drawn by two horses, carried stores, baggage, and provisions. Five packhorses and carts transported entrenching tools and related supplies, including 111 shovels, 71 pickaxes, 9 spades, 39 large axes, 26 small axes, 43 bill hooks, 20 saws, 420 lbs of gun cotton, 1,000 sandbags, and 10 crowbars. With these resources, a field company could build a 75-foot light bridge for infantry or a 45-foot bridge able to support all arms.

The smaller, more mobile mounted detachment featured six two-horse carts for baggage, provisions, and forage, plus six four-horse carts for engineering tools and technical gear. These, along with six packhorses, carried 12 shovels, 18 pickaxes, 30 spades, 18 large and 6 small axes, 24 bill hooks, 15 saws, 436 lbs of gun cotton, 600 sandbags, and 6 crowbars. Dismounted engineers were equipped similarly to infantry, bearing rifles and bayonets. Mounted engineers’ gear matched that of mounted artillerymen. Noncommissioned officers and trumpeters carried sabers and revolvers, drivers had revolvers, and mounted engineers were armed with carbines and sword bayonets.

== Warfare ==
In the early Victorian period, the tactics of the British army remained largely unchanged from those used during the Napoleonic Wars, with focusing on rigid line and column formations. However, the second half of the 19th century saw significant changes influenced by technological advances in weaponry and lessons learned from conflicts such as the Franco-Prussian War – even if these lessons were not always fully implemented. In the 1870s and 1880s, greater emphasis was placed on depth attacks and increased infantry movement speed. Traditional line and column formations were increasingly abandoned. Instead, an attacking battalion deployed two companies as vanguard, two companies in line behind them as immediate support, and the remaining four companies as further support in the rear. The tactical objective was to send reinforcements forward during the attack and, through a combination of firing and short, rapid advances, achieve fire superiority over the enemy before launching a full bayonet charge. The vanguard was encouraged to seek cover, but only to the extent that this did not compromise the cohesion of the unit.

The widespread introduction of breech-loading rifles such as the Snider and Martini-Henry made these new tactics possible. Soldiers could now load and fire from a kneeling or prone position, which was a significant departure from the previous practice of firing while standing. This allowed for more dispersed formations and made the use of open formation tactics both necessary and practical. At longer ranges, typically over 600 meters, volley fire remained the preferred method, both to conserve ammunition and to have a psychological effect on the enemy. However, the use of black powder produced dense smoke that could obscure targets and occasionally forced units to interrupt their fire to allow the smoke to clear—this was particularly a problem with defensive formations such as the square. At shorter ranges, independent aimed fire became more common as accuracy against individual targets became essential.

In defensive situations, the square formation retained its importance as a countermeasure against fast and numerically superior enemies, preferably cavalry. Since the corners of the square were particularly vulnerable, the British Army began placing artillery or machine guns at the corners to reinforce them. Artillery tactics also evolved during this period. Artillery commanders gained more autonomy from their traditional support roles for infantry or cavalry and were instead given broader objectives and the ability to use their resources at their own discretion. This increased flexibility was supported by technical improvements that offered greater range and accuracy. However, the British Army's field forces were often inadequately equipped with artillery, so batteries had to be widely dispersed. By the 1880s, the trend toward flexible and staggered infantry attack formations had become established. Attacks were carried out in three lines in open formation: the first line dominated with firepower, the second advanced through the first line to carry out a bayonet charge, and the third either pursued the defeated enemy or covered the retreat. The use of cover remained acceptable as long as it did not compromise the integrity of the formation.

Cavalry tactics underwent fewer innovations, as many officers were reluctant to abandon their traditional role. The main tasks of the cavalry were expanded to include reconnaissance, exploration, security, and outpost work, roles that became all the more important as the effectiveness of cavalry attacks declined in the face of modern firearms. British cavalry traditionally operated on the flanks of the infantry and was not usually massed in the center, preferring to attack in echelon or oblique formations to force the enemy to withdraw reserves from threatened sectors. The transition from muskets to rifles, combined with the experience gained from conflicts in continental Europe and America, gradually changed the role of cavalry on the battlefield.

In colonial wars, where the terrain and lack of regular cavalry limited the use of mounted shock attacks, ad hoc mounted infantry units were formed by placing volunteers from infantry battalions on horses or camels. These units specialized in reconnaissance and fighting on foot with firearms, a practice that was formalized in 1888 with the establishment of permanent cavalry schools in Great Britain. The Boer War underscored the necessity of mounted infantry, as the Boers themselves excelled in this form of warfare, prompting the British to establish special mounted infantry battalions and to employ similar tactics in the Yeomanry and colonial forces.

== Campaigns ==
=== British expansion in India ===
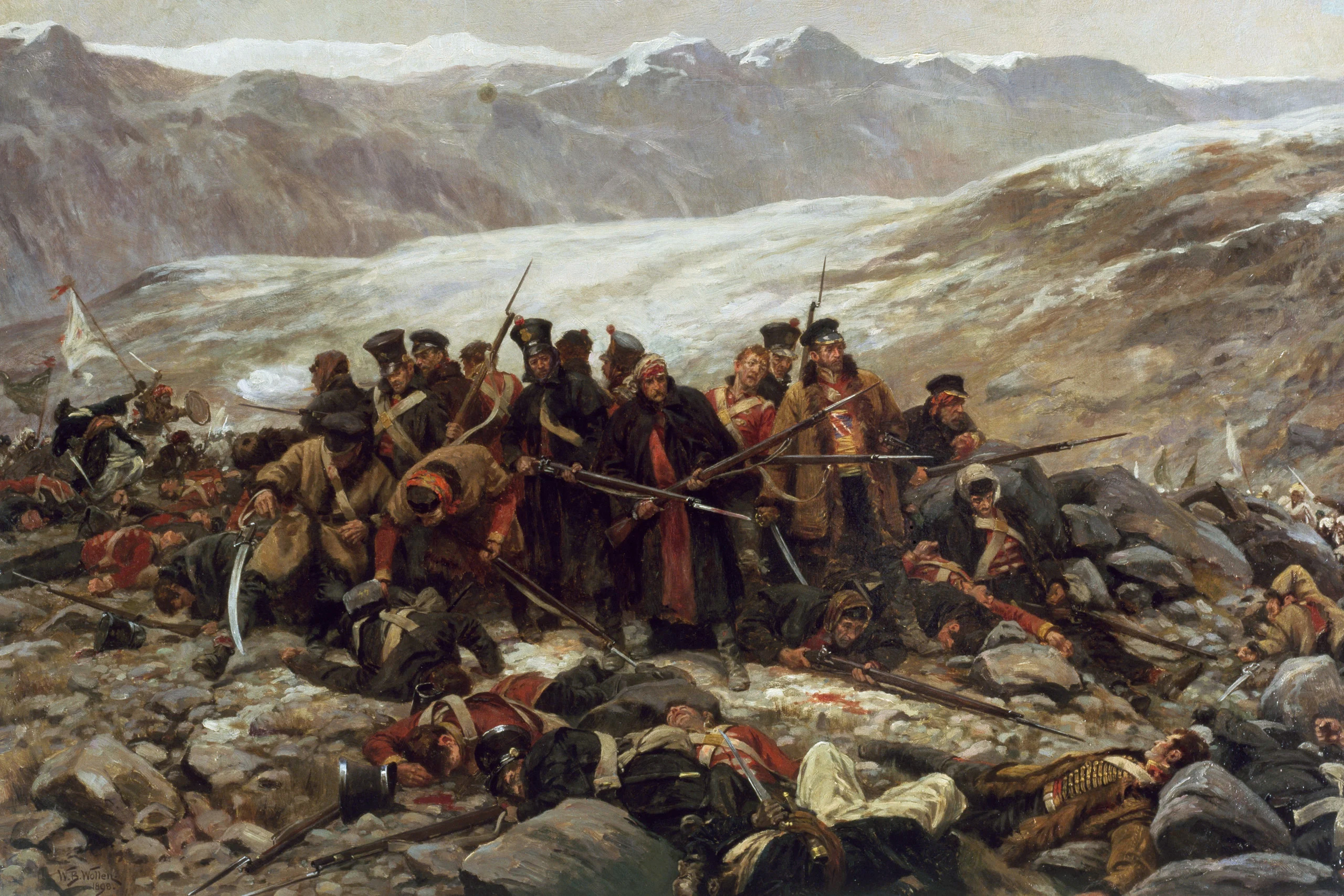
The Last Stand of the 44th Regiment at Gundamuck by William Barnes Wollen, 1898. The last stand of the 44th Foot, during the Massacre of Elphinstone's Army

During the Victorian era, the British Army was involved in several significant conflicts in Asia. After overcoming the states of Gwalior and Sindh in India, the British faced the independent Sikh Empire. Following the death of Ranjit Singh in 1839, instability led to the First Anglo-Sikh War (1845–1846), where the British defeated the Khalsa and gained control over much of the Punjab. Continued unrest among the Sikhs resulted in the Second Anglo-Sikh War (1848–1849), after which the Punjab was fully annexed, ending independent rule in the region. On the eastern frontier, the Second Anglo-Burmese War in 1852 further reduced Burmese territory under British control, with British forces suffering more from disease and climate than from battle.

=== Internal security ===
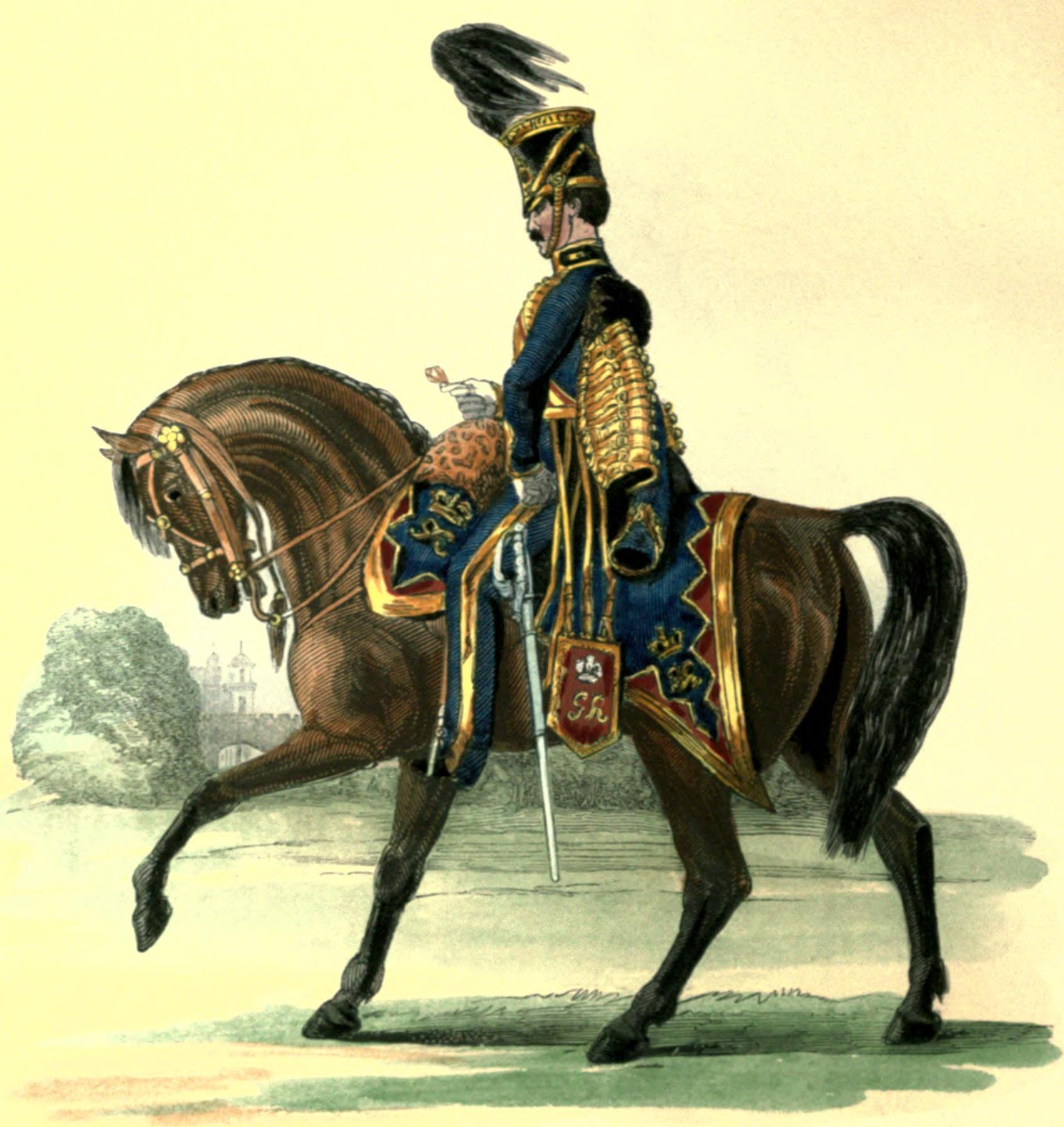
Trooper of the 7th Queen's Own Hussars, 1842

During the Victorian era, the British Army played a key role in maintaining public order and suppressing unrest within the United Kingdom. The memory of the Peterloo Massacre in 1819, where cavalry charged a peaceful protest in Manchester with deadly results, profoundly shaped how the authorities approached civil disturbances in subsequent decades. Determined to avoid a repeat of such bloodshed, the government and military developed more measured and disciplined responses to protests, riots, and strikes.

Soldiers were often deployed to trouble spots, but strict rules were put in place regarding the use of force. The army worked alongside local police, who increasingly took the lead in crowd control, with the military acting as a last resort. When called upon, officers were careful to follow clear chains of command and to use force only when absolutely necessary. Soldiers were trained to act with restraint and to disperse crowds without provoking violence. In cases such as the Chartist demonstrations and industrial strikes, the mere presence of disciplined troops was often enough to deter unrest without the need for direct confrontation.

Except in Ireland, the need for soldiers to aid the civil government and local magistrates declined with the passing of successive Reform Acts, which eventually extended the franchise to almost the whole male population of Britain, increasing industrialisation with migration to the cities and the organisation of county and metropolitan police forces. Nevertheless, troops were called out to maintain order as late as 1913, in the aftermath of the Tonypandy Riot. In the growing British dominions overseas, British troops took part in the suppression of the Rebellions of 1837 in Canada, and the defeat of the Eureka Rebellion in Australia. In Australia, between 1810 and 1870, a total of 24 British Army infantry regiments served in a garrison role defending the Australian colonies until they were able to take responsibility for their own defence.

=== Crimean War ===
The Crimean War (1853–1856) was a defining conflict for the British Army, fought mainly against Russia alongside France, the Ottoman Empire, and Piedmont-Sardinia. The British Army was involved in several major battles, beginning with the landing at Calamita Bay and the advance inland. The first significant engagement was the Battle of Alma in September 1854, where British and French forces defeated the Russians, opening the way to Sevastopol.

When the war broke out, there were nominally 70,000 soldiers stationed in Britain, but this included units at sea proceeding to or from overseas postings, some recruits not yet trained, and large numbers of soldiers too infirm to serve in the field. To furnish a field army of 25,000 for the expedition, almost the entire effective establishment in Britain was dispatched and the garrison in India was dangerously weakened. The army that took part in the Siege of Sevastopol was badly led, but won all its field engagements, sometimes at high cost. The system of sale of commissions came under scrutiny during the war, especially in connection with the Battle of Balaclava, which was notable for the ill-fated Charge of the Light Brigade.

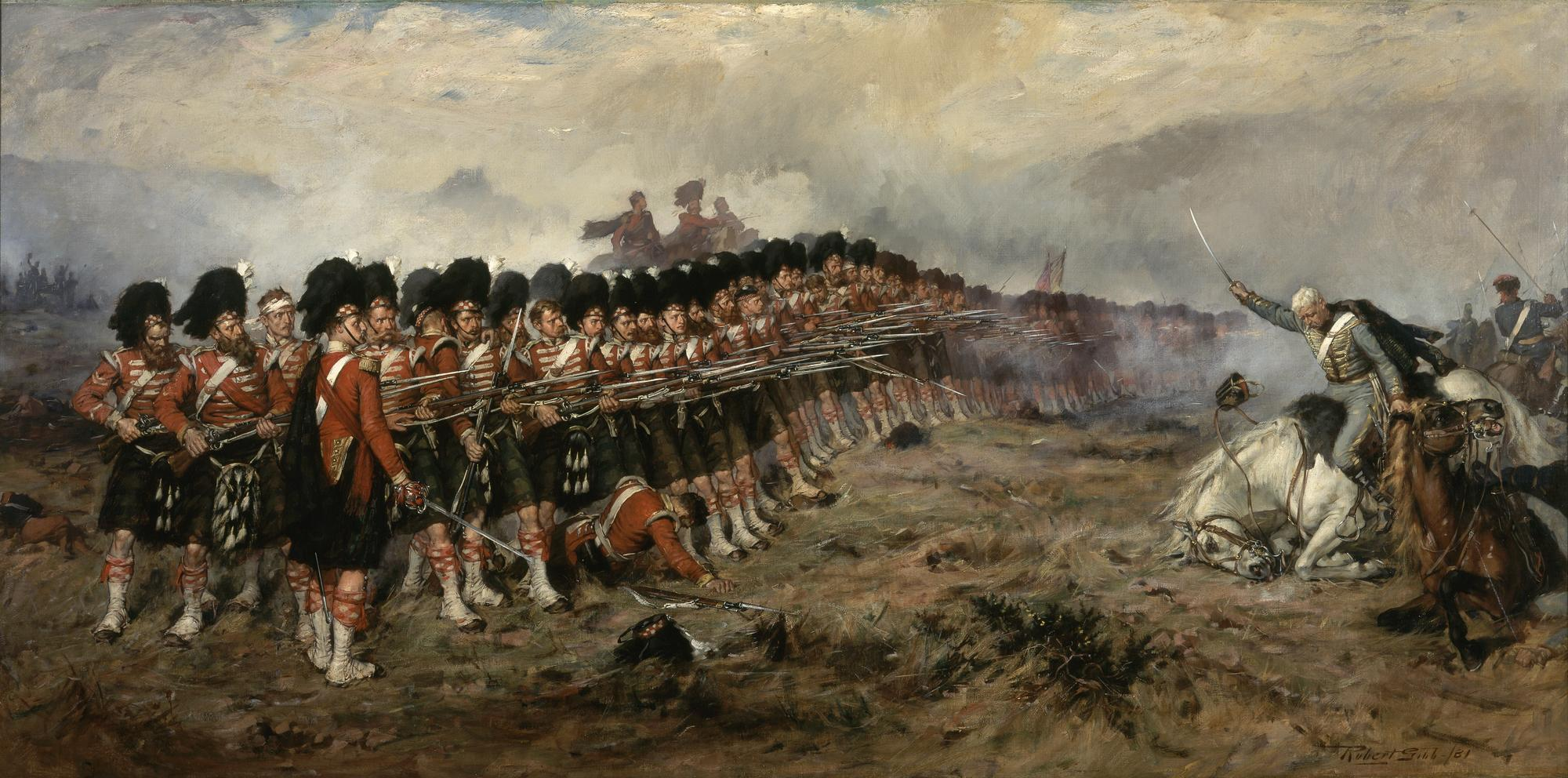
The Thin Red Line at the Battle of Balaclava, where the 93rd Sutherland Highlanders held off Russian cavalry

The Battle of Inkerman in November 1854 saw British and French troops successfully defend their positions against a much larger Russian force, thanks in part to determined infantry action. During the Crimean War, the British Army struggled with significant difficulties, especially in planning and logistics. The army’s supply system was poorly organized, leading to severe shortages of food, clothing, and equipment. Soldiers often went without proper shelter or adequate rations, even during the harsh winter, which resulted in widespread suffering and high rates of illness. Communication failures and mismanagement were common, as seen in the confusion that led to the Charge of the Light Brigade. Medical care for wounded and sick soldiers was also critically lacking, with overcrowded and unsanitary hospitals contributing to a high death rate from disease. It was not until the arrival of Florence Nightingale and her team of nurses at Scutari Hospital before conditions of the wounded changed. Nightingale introduced strict sanitation practices, better organization, and improved nutrition for patients. She insisted on cleanliness, proper ventilation, and systematic care, which dramatically lowered mortality rates and eased the suffering of the wounded.

The staff work of the Commissariat Department, responsible for supplies and transport, proved unequal to the demands of the campaign. Supplies often arrived late, and were not distributed until they rotted. Commissariat officers adhered to arbitrary peacetime regulations, for example, refusing to issue nails in quantities less than one ton. The result was the death of many soldiers through disease (exacerbated by dietary deficiencies) and exposure during the winter of 1854–1855.

=== India, Afghanistan, China and Burma ===
Once the Indian Rebellion had been crushed, the only armed opposition to British rule in India came from the Pakhtun inhabitants of the North West Frontier Province adjacent to Afghanistan. Numerous expeditions were launched to subdue rebellious tribes or regions. Although the Indian units of the Indian Army bore the brunt of campaigns on the frontier, British units formed part of most Indian Army formations.

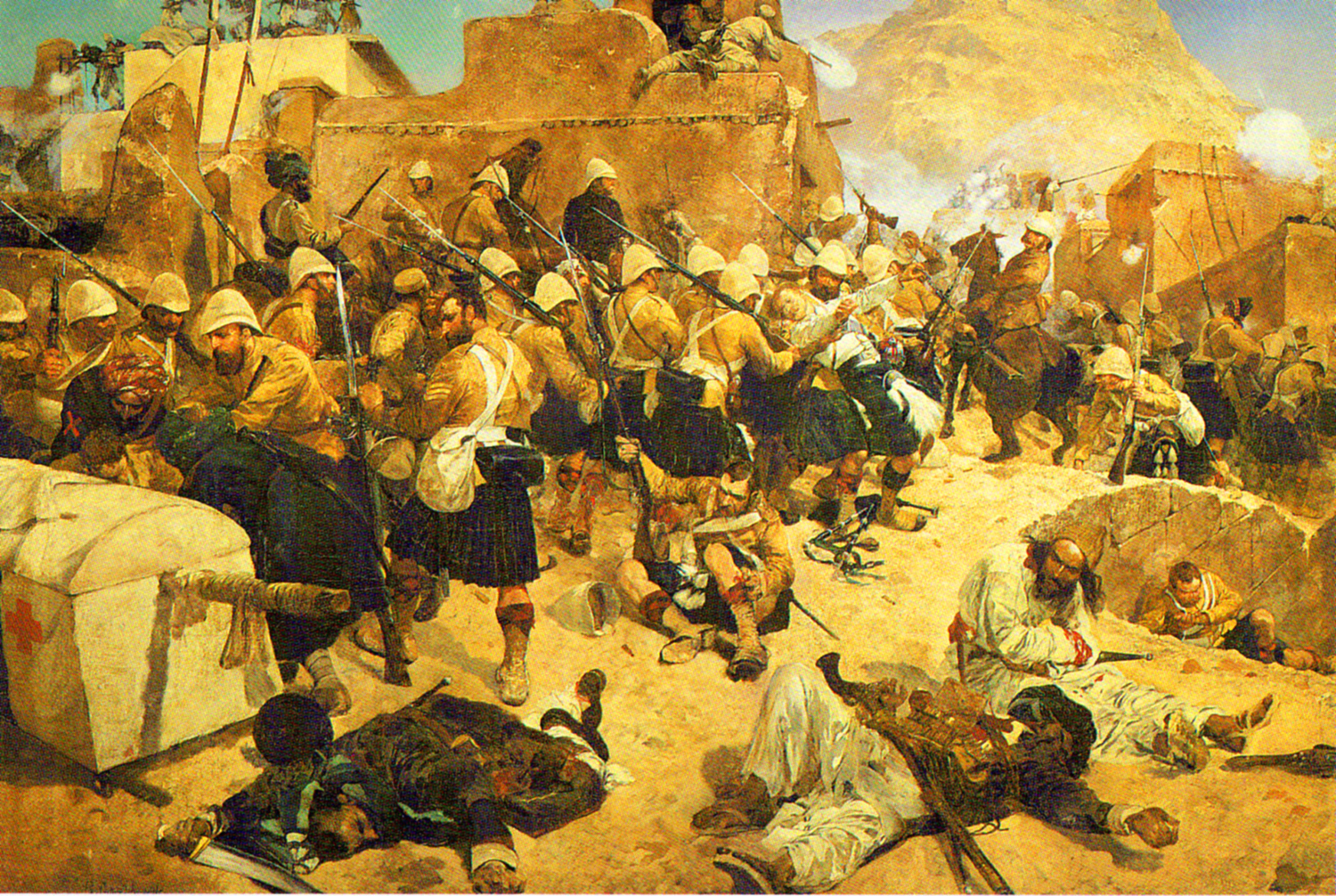
Gordon Highlanders at Kandahar, 1880

In the 19th century, the Russian Empire had extended its influence to Central Asia, thereby moving closer to the northwestern border of the British Raj.Fearing Russian influence in Afghanistan. The British invaded to remove the unreliable Emir Dost Mohammed Khan and install the more compliant Shuja Shah Durrani. The British initially captured Kabul, but after a series of strategic missteps and mounting Afghan resistance, their occupation ended in disaster. The retreat from Kabul in 1842 was catastrophic, with nearly the entire British force wiped out. Although British troops later returned to Kabul in a punitive expedition, they soon withdrew and restored Dost Mohammed, having failed to establish lasting control.

The rivalry continued to intensify as Russia advanced steadily toward the frontiers of British India. In 1856, the British intervened in the Anglo-Persian War after Persia, with Russian encouragement, besieged the Afghan city of Herat—a strategic gateway to India. The British, determined to prevent Persia from gaining a foothold in Afghanistan, launched a successful campaign, capturing the Persian port of Bushehr and winning the decisive Battle of Khushab. The war ended in 1857 with Persia withdrawing its claims over Herat, preserving Afghanistan as a buffer state between the British and Russian empires.

British anxieties over Russian ambitions in Central Asia remained, and were exacerbated by the Russo-Turkish War (1877–1878) during which Britain sent a fleet through the Dardanelles as a gesture of support for Turkey, and also deployed a division of troops in Malta. The Second Anglo-Afghan War erupted in 1878 after renewed Russian activity in Kabul. The British invaded Afghanistan again, winning key battles at Ali Masjid and capturing Kabul, but faced fierce resistance, including the massacre of their envoy in the capital. The British responded with a forceful campaign, culminating in General Frederick Roberts’s victory at the Battle of Kandahar in 1880. Following this, Afghanistan’s foreign policy came under British control, though internal matters remained in Afghan hands.

The British Army also participated in the First Opium War against China, which resulted in the occupation of Hong Kong and a blow to Chinese prestige. There were major uprisings towards the end of the nineteenth century in Malakand and Tirah.

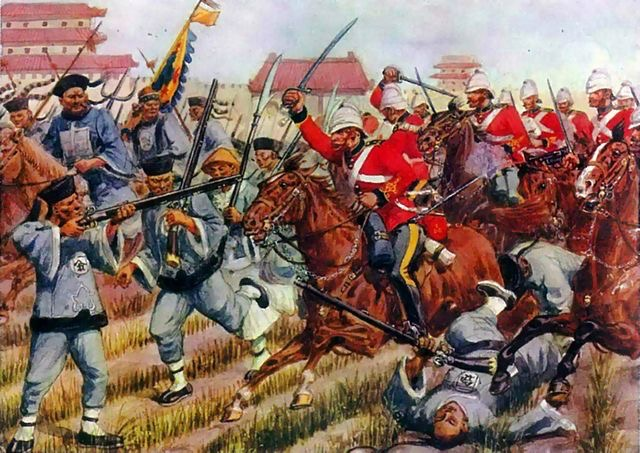
1st King's Dragoon Guards taking Beijing during the Second Opium War in 1860

Further disputes with China after the Treaty of Nanking led to the Second Opium War, which began even as the Indian Rebellion of 1857 was being suppressed. A combined British-French-American force defeated China again, with the Chinese government being forced to sign yet another unequal treaty. In 1900, British and Indian troops took part in the fighting against the Boxer Rebellion. In Burma in 1886, disputes over the treaties signed earlier in the century between Britain and Burma led to the Third Anglo-Burmese War, after which the entire country was finally annexed to Britain.

==== Indian Rebellion of 1857 ====
The steady erosion of trust between British officers and their Indian sepoys, intensified by the increasing presence of British families and decreased daily interaction between officers and soldiers, contributed to widespread discontent. British policies such as Lord Dalhousie's doctrine of lapse, which allowed for the annexation of states without a male heir, and the deposition of the king of Oudh, alienated both the sepoys—many of whom hailed from Oudh—and local rulers, who feared for the autonomy of their own domains. Economic grievances, including the abolition of the batta allowance for service in newly annexed territories and the imposition of new tax systems like Mahalwari, further fueled resentment. High-caste Hindus were especially aggrieved by the General Service Enlistment Act of 1856, which required overseas service and threatened their caste status.

Religious and cultural interference by the British, such as the abolition of practices like suttee and the legalization of widow remarriage, were perceived by many Indians as assaults on their traditions and attempts at forced conversion to Christianity. Rumors and prophecies of British rule ending a century after the Battle of Plassey circulated widely, adding to the climate of anxiety and suspicion. The immediate spark for the mutiny was the introduction of the Enfield rifle and its greased cartridges, believed to be coated in cow and pig fat—substances abhorrent to Hindu and Muslim sepoys, respectively. The refusal of sepoys to use the cartridges led to disciplinary action and unrest, culminating in the events at Meerut on 10 May 1857, when mutinous sepoys attacked British officers and their families, freed imprisoned comrades, and marched to Delhi. There, they sought to restore the Mughal emperor, signaling the start of a widespread revolt.

Militarily, the mutiny was initially concentrated in the Bengal Army, with 64 regiments mutinying or being disarmed, compared to minimal unrest in the Bombay and Madras Armies. The conflict unfolded in several major campaigns: the siege and eventual recapture of Delhi (June–September 1857); the desperate defense and relief of Lucknow (July–November 1857), followed by the final capture of the city in March 1858; the defense and battles for Cawnpore; and operations to pacify Oudh and Rohilkhand. Central India saw two phases of fighting, culminating in the Battle of Gwalior in June 1858, the last major engagement of the rebellion. Mopping-up operations continued into 1859 as British forces restored control. The mutiny officially ended on 8 July 1859 with a proclamation of peace by Lord Canning.

=== Africa ===
In southern Africa, the British were drawn into repeated conflicts with local powers and settler groups as they sought to expand their influence. The Ninth Cape Frontier War (1877–1879) was the last in a series of confrontations between British colonial forces and the Xhosa people, resulting in the annexation of Xhosa lands and the deepening of British control over the Eastern Cape. Shortly afterwards, the Anglo-Zulu War of 1879 erupted when British authorities, seeking to neutralise the military threat of the Zulu Kingdom, invaded Zululand. Although the Zulu achieved a remarkable victory at Isandlwana, the British ultimately prevailed, dismantling the Zulu state and incorporating its territory into the colony of Natal. The struggle for supremacy in southern Africa continued with the First Boer War (1880–1881), in which the Boers, descendants of Dutch settlers, resisted British attempts at annexation, winning a measure of independence for the Transvaal. However, the discovery of gold and the strategic importance of the region led to renewed conflict in the Second Boer War (1899–1902), a bitter and protracted struggle marked by guerrilla warfare and civilian suffering, which concluded with British victory and the creation of the Union of South Africa.

In West Africa, British expansion encountered fierce opposition from the Ashanti Empire, leading to a series of five Anglo-Ashanti Wars between 1823 and 1900. The Ashanti resisted British encroachment on their sovereignty and trade routes, but repeated military defeats culminated in the capture of Kumasi and the formal annexation of Ashanti territory into the Gold Coast colony. Similarly, in what is now southeastern Nigeria, the Anglo-Aro War (1901–1902) aimed to suppress the Aro Confederacy, whose powerful trading networks and religious influence were seen as obstacles to colonial rule; the British victory dismantled the confederacy and facilitated the imposition of direct administration. In Northern Africa, the British occupation of Egypt followed the suppression of the Urabi Revolt in 1882, a nationalist uprising against the Khedive and European domination. British forces intervened to protect their strategic interests, particularly the Suez Canal, and established a veiled protectorate that would endure until the mid-twentieth century. In the territories that would become Rhodesia, the First and Second Matabele Wars (1893–1894 and 1896–1897) saw the British South Africa Company, backed by imperial troops, defeat the Ndebele and Shona peoples after fierce resistance, paving the way for settler colonialism.

==== Egypt and Sudan ====
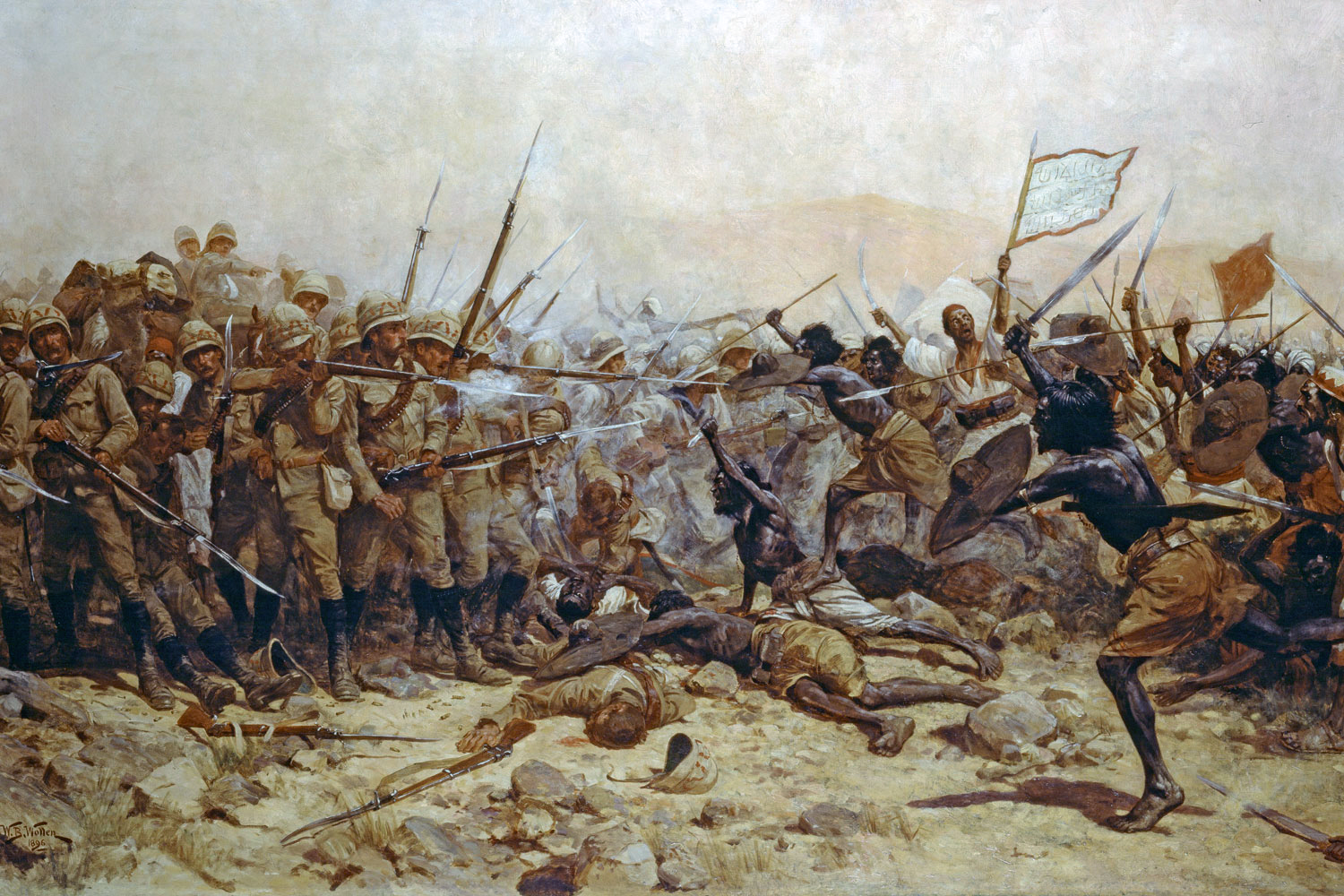
The Battle of Abu Klea, which took place during the desert expedition to bring relief to General Gordon, besieged in Khartoum, 1885

The roots of the war lay in widespread dissatisfaction with Egyptian rule in Sudan, which had been characterized by efforts to suppress the slave trade and attempts at administrative reform under figures such as Colonel Charles Gordon. In 1881, Muhammad Ahmad ibn Abd Allah proclaimed himself the Mahdi, a messianic leader, and rallied widespread support among Sudanese, particularly the Baggara tribes. Following a series of military successes, including the defeat of Egyptian forces and the capture of El Obeid in 1883, the Mahdists rapidly expanded their control, culminating in the destruction of General Hicks’s army at Kashgil and the collapse of Egyptian authority across much of Sudan.

British involvement increased reluctantly, primarily to protect evacuation routes and key positions such as Suakin. Attempts to relieve besieged garrisons, most famously at Khartoum, ended in failure when the Mahdists captured the city and killed Gordon in January 1885, after a lengthy siege and delayed British relief efforts. The death of the Mahdi from smallpox later that year saw his successor, Abdullah al-Taashi (the Khalifa), consolidate power and rule Sudan for over a decade, despite facing internal revolts and external challenges, including skirmishes with the Anglo-Egyptian frontier forces.

The Khalifa’s regime suffered military defeats at the hands of Anglo-Egyptian expeditions in the late 1880s and early 1890s, but it was not until the end of the century that a determined effort to reconquer Sudan was launched. Under the command of General Herbert Kitchener, a modern Anglo-Egyptian army advanced methodically, constructing railways and securing logistical support. Major victories, particularly at the battles of Atbara and Omdurman in 1898, decisively broke Mahdist power. The capture of Omdurman and the subsequent death of the Khalifa at Om Debreikat in 1899 ended organized Mahdist resistance. Following the war, Sudan was placed under Anglo-Egyptian rule, formally known as the Anglo-Egyptian Condominium, with effective control exercised by the British.
