= First Chimurenga =

British–Matebele conflict, 1896–1897

- Part of the Matabele Wars and Scramble for Africa
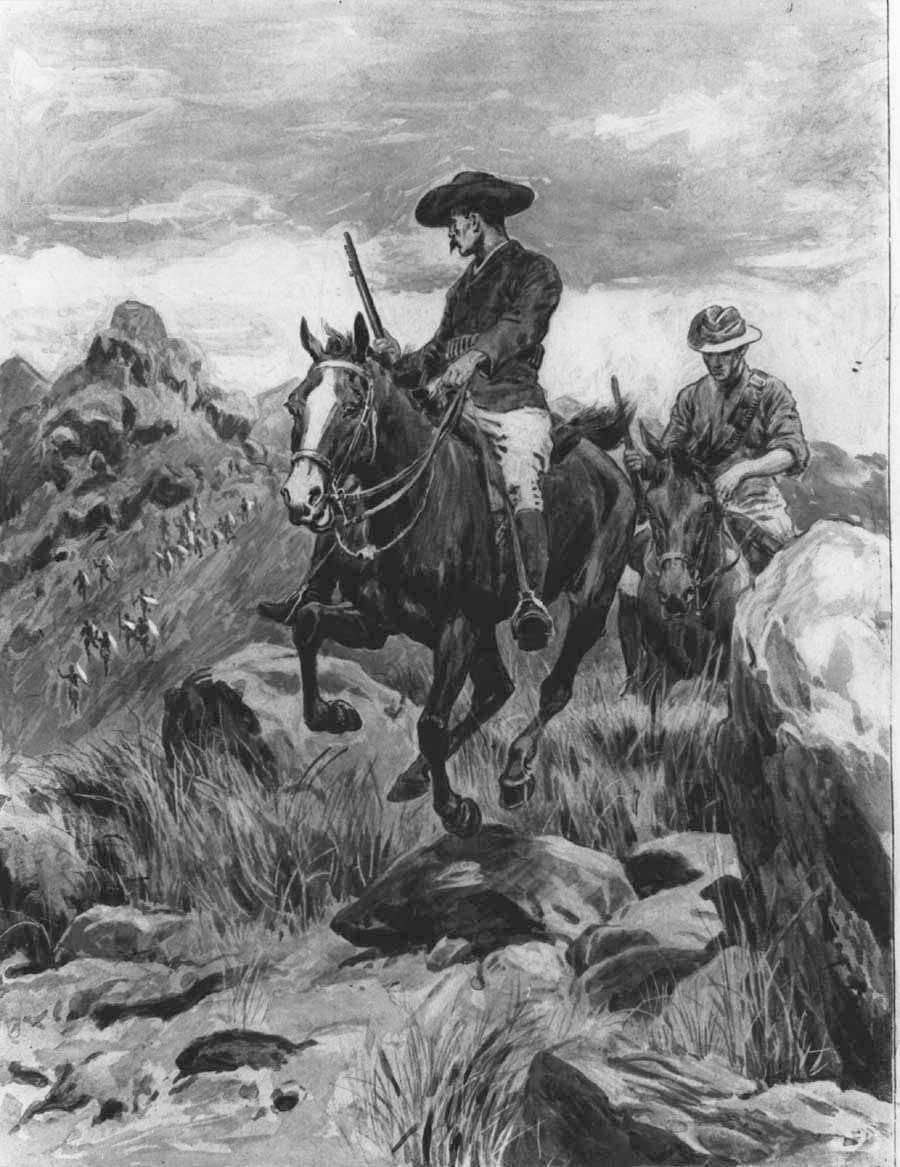
- Depiction of Burnham and Armstrong after the assassination of Mlimo. Matabele warriors in hot pursuit, drawn by Frank Dadd.
| Date | March 1896 – October 1897 |
| Location | Matabeleland and Mashonaland |
| Result | Company victory |

Belligerents
| British South Africa Company | Matabele; Mashona |

Commanders and leaders
| Robert Baden-Powell; Frederick Carrington; Cecil Rhodes; Herbert Plumer | Nehanda; Mlimo †; Sikhombo Mguni; Lozikeyi; Sekuru Kaguvi; Chinengundu Mashayamombe; Inyanda |

The First Chimurenga, also known as the Second Matabele War, was fought between 1896 and 1897 in the region that later became Southern Rhodesia (now Zimbabwe). The conflict was initially between the British South Africa Company (BSAC) and the Matabele people, later expanding to include the Shona people in the rest of Southern Rhodesia.

In March 1896, the Matabele revolted against the authority of the BSAC. The Mlimo (or M'limo, or Umlimo) the Matabele spiritual leader, was credited with fomenting much of the anger that led to this confrontation. He convinced the Matabele and the Shona that the settlers (almost 4,000 strong by then) were responsible for the drought, locust plagues and the cattle disease rinderpest ravaging the country at the time.

The Mlimo's call to battle was well-timed. Only a few months earlier, the British South Africa Company's Administrator General for Matabeleland, Leander Starr Jameson, had sent most of his troops and armaments to fight the Transvaal Republic in the ill-fated Jameson Raid. This left the country nearly defenceless. The BSAC immediately sent troops to suppress the uprising, but it cost the lives of many on both sides. Months passed before the BSAC's forces were strong enough to break the sieges and defend the major settlements, and war raged on until October of the following year.

== The War in Matabeleland ==
=== Rebellion ===
The Mlimo planned to wait until the night of 29 March, the first full moon, to take Bulawayo by surprise immediately after a ceremony called the Big Dance. He promised, through his priests, that if the Matabele went to war, the bullets of the settlers would change to water and their cannon shells would become eggs. His plan was to kill all of the settlers in Bulawayo first, but not to destroy the town itself as it would serve again as the royal kraal for the newly reincarnated King Lobengula. The Mlimo decreed that the settlers should be attacked and driven from the country through the Mangwe Pass on the Western edge of the Matobo Hills, which was to be left open and unguarded for this reason. Once the settlers were purged from Bulawayo, the Matabele and Shona warriors would head out into the countryside and continue the slaughter until all the settlers were either killed or had fled.

However, several young Matabele were overly anxious to go to war, and the rebellion started prematurely. On 20 March, Matabele rebels shot and stabbed a native policeman. Over the next few days, other outlying settlers and prospectors were killed. Frederick Selous, the famous big-game hunter, had heard rumours of settlers in the countryside being killed, but he thought it was a localised problem. When news of the policeman's murder reached Selous on 23 March, he knew the Matabele had started a massive uprising.

Nearly 2,000 Matabele warriors began the rebellion in earnest on 24 March. Many, although not all, of the young native police quickly deserted and joined the rebels. The Matabele headed into the countryside armed with a variety of weapons, including: Martini-Henry rifles, Winchester repeaters, Lee-Metfords, assegais, knobkerries and battle-axes. As news of the massive rebellion spread, the Shona joined in the fighting, and the settlers headed towards Bulawayo. Within a week, 141 settlers were slain in Matabeleland, another 103 killed in Mashonaland, and hundreds of homes, ranches and mines were burned. At the Insiza River, it has been recorded that Mrs. Fourie and her six small children were found mutilated beyond recognition on their farmstead. Two young women of the Ross family living nearby were similarly killed in their newly built home.

=== Siege of Bulawayo ===
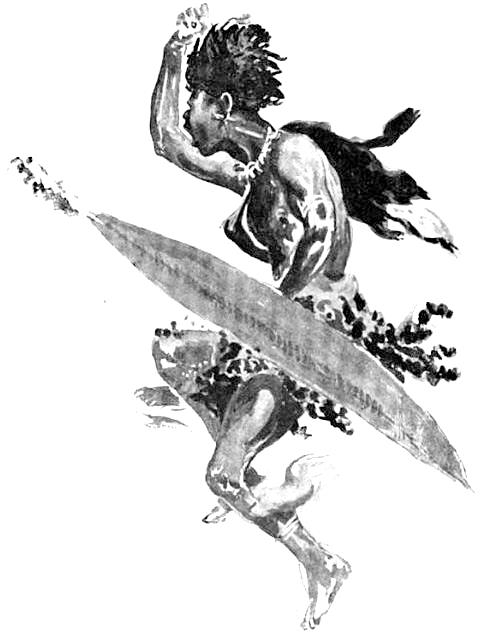
Sketch by Robert Baden-Powell of a Ndebele warrior

With few troops to support them, the settlers quickly built a laager of sandbagged wagons in the centre of Bulawayo on their own. Barbed wire was added to Bulawayo's defences. Oil-soaked fagots were arranged in strategic locations in case of attack at night. Blasting gelatin was secreted in outlying buildings that were beyond the defence perimeter, to be exploded in the event the enemy occupied them. Smashed glass bottles were spread around the front of the wagons. Except for hunting rifles, there were few weapons to be found in Bulawayo. However, the settlers did have access to a few working artillery pieces and a small assortment of machine guns.

Rather than wait passively, the settlers immediately mounted patrols, called the Bulawayo Field Force, under such figures as Selous and Frederick Russell Burnham; these rode out to rescue any surviving settlers in the countryside and went on attack against the Matabele. Selous raised a mounted troop of forty men to scout southward into the Matobo Hills. Maurice Gifford, along with 40 men, rode east along the Iniza River. Whenever settlers were found, they were quickly loaded into their wagons and closely guarded on their way to Bulawayo. Within the first week of fighting, 20 men of the Bulawayo Field Force were killed and another 50 were wounded.

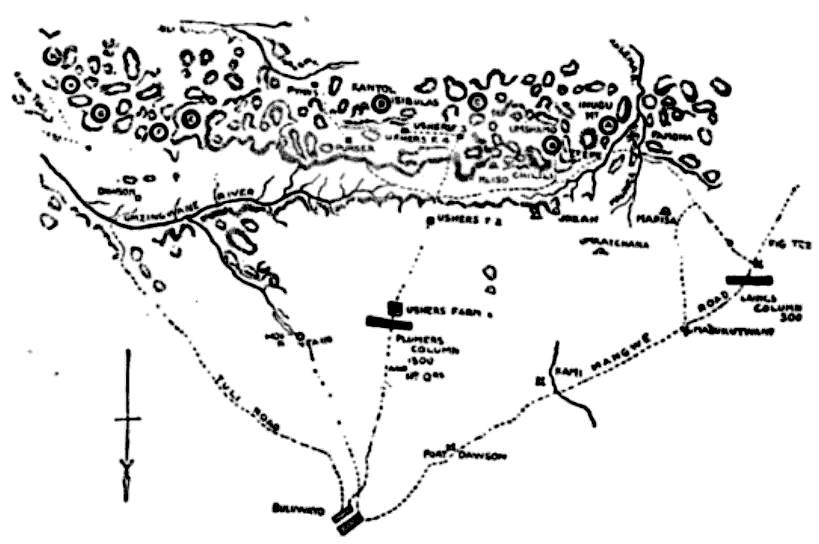
Map of Bulawayo-Matobo Hills, drawn by Baden-Powell

In the First Matabele War, the Matabele had experienced the effectiveness of the settlers' Maxim guns, so they never mounted a significant attack against Bulawayo even though more than 10,000 Matabele warriors could be seen near the town. Conditions inside Bulawayo, however, quickly became unbearable. During the day, settlers could go to homes and buildings within the town, but at night they were forced to seek shelter in the much smaller laager. Nearly 1,000 women and children were crowded into the city, and false alarms of attacks were common. Although they kept up their siege, the Matabele made one critical error: they neglected to cut the telegraph lines connecting Bulawayo to Mafeking. This gave both the relief forces and the besieged Bulawayo Field Force far more information than they would otherwise have had.

Several relief columns were organised to break the siege, but the long trek through hostile countryside took several months. Late in May, the first two relief columns appeared near Bulawayo on almost the same day but from opposite directions – Cecil Rhodes and Col. Beal arriving from Salisbury, 430 kilometres (270 mi) north-east, via Fort Victoria, 282 kilometres (175 mi) to the east, both in Mashonaland; and Lord Grey and Col. Plumer (of the York and Lancaster Regiment) from Kimberley, 970 kilometres (600 mi) to the south, via Mafeking. The southern relief forces were nearly ambushed on their approach to Bulawayo, but Selous discovered the whereabouts of the Matabele and the Maxim guns of the relief forces drove back the attackers. Not long after relief forces began arriving in Bulawayo, General Frederick Carrington arrived to take overall command along with his chief of staff, Colonel Baden-Powell.

With the siege broken, an estimated 50,000 Matabele retreated into their stronghold of the Matobo Hills near Bulawayo. This region became the scene of the fiercest fighting between the settler patrols and the Matabele. By June, the Shona kept their promise and joined the fighting on the side of the Matabele. But lacking a clear leader similar to Mlimo, the Shonas mostly stayed behind their fortifications and conducted few raids.

=== Assassination of Mlimo ===
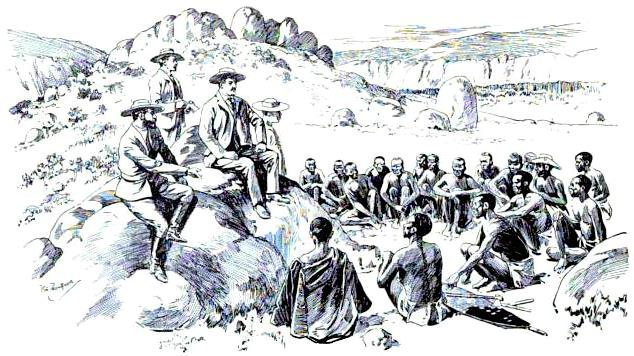
Rhodes makes peace with the Ndebele in Matobo Hills, 1896; sketch by Baden-Powell

Military intelligence at the time thought that capturing the Mlimo would be the speediest way to end the war. The location of the Mlimo's cave had been disclosed to the native commissioner at Mangwe, Bonar Armstrong, by an unnamed Zulu informant. Armstrong immediately brought this information to the Chief of Scouts, Burnham, and the two men presented it to the administrator of Southern Rhodesia, Earl Grey. The administrator instructed them to present this information to the military commander, General Carrington, who called in his chief of staff, Baden-Powell. Carrington instructed Burnham, Armstrong, and Baden-Powell to leave that very night to "Capture the Mlimo if you can. Kill him if you must. Do not let him escape." Intervening news of enemy movements near Bembezi forced Baden-Powell to go there instead, so Burnham and Armstrong proceeded on their own to the Matopos.

Burnham and Armstrong travelled by night through the Matobo Hills and approached the sacred cave. Not far from the cave was a village of about 100 huts filled with many warriors. The two scouts tethered their horses to a thicket and crawled on their bellies, screening their slow and cautious movements with branches held before them. Once inside the cave, they waited until Mlimo entered.

Once Mlimo started his dance of immunity, Burnham shot him just below the heart, killing him. The two men then leapt over the dead Mlimo and ran down a trail towards their horses. Hundreds of warriors, encamped nearby, picked up their arms and started in pursuit. Burnham set fire to the village as a distraction. The two men hurried back to Bulawayo, with warriors in pursuit

Following news of Mlimo's death, overseas press hailed Burnham and Armstrong as "heroes of the British Empire". But in Rhodesia, sections of the press were sceptical about Mlimo's assassination. The British were under the mistaken belief that Mlimo and the high priest, or prophet, in the Matopos were one and the same. Based on British intelligence reports, Carrington believed that the Mlimo was a central authority and that "his orders fly about from one end of the country to another with great rapidity". Historian Terence Ranger writes that "Carrington was almost certainly over-estimating the centralization (of the Mlimo)", and that "Baden-Powell and other reporters tended to run the various shrines in the Matopos into one". Frederick Selous believed that the head priest of the Mlimo lived in the Matopos, but that "there are other priests, or so-called Umlimos, in other parts of the country through whom they believe that the commands of the Almighty can be conveyed to them." Burnham had carried out his instructions from Carrington and, like Carrington, he relied heavily on Armstrong and military intelligence for his information. Armstrong, the instigator and active participant in the operation, "was an authority on the Native, his language, customs and mentality", according to fellow native commissioner E. C. Harley. Armstrong was also a major in the Mangwe Field Force, and Selous describes him as young, but "shrewd and capable". Selous and Harley say that Armstrong was in command at the Mangwe laager, although Baden-Powell and other sources name van Rooyen and Lee as the commanders. Some writers also describe Armstrong as young and moody and claim that he too expressed doubts about the identity of the man killed, but only after the assassination.

Initially, the company declined to review the matter and Burnham left Rhodesia on 11 July 1896, a week after the Bulawayo Field Force disbanded, to return to the United States and later joined the Klondike Gold Rush. However, at Armstrong's insistence a court of inquiry was later appointed to investigate the assassination. (Note: No date is given for the court of inquiry, presided by Judge Watermeyer. However, it must have met sometime after Burnham left Rhodesia since he does not mention it in his memoirs or his letters, historians referenced in this article do not comment on his having participated, and after he left for the Klondike Gold Rush, Burnham did not return to Africa until the Second Boer War when Lord Roberts asked him to join his headquarters staff on the recommendation of Carrington. Baden-Powell was likely in Rhodesia at the time of the Watermeyer inquiry, but he too does not mention it and historians referenced in this article do not mention his having participated.) Although several writers have commented on the outcome, the official report itself has been lost. Referring to the court's report, Harley writes, "The finding of the Judge (Watermeyer) was that the native killed was the Chief Priest of the M'limo. Whether there was another occult personage associated with the M'limo deception is problematical, for with the death of the Chief Priest, the M'limo deception also died." But historian Hugh Marshall Hole writes, "On their return they were greatly applauded for having achieved their dangerous errand, but some time later, when it was found that Mlimo was still at work, an official inquiry was held, with the result that the whole affair was exposed as an elaborate hoax." In contrast to Hole, historians Mary and Richard Bradford, Mary Clarke, Peter Emmerson, and Jack Lott all agree with Harley that the court of inquiry favoured Armstrong. Emmerson cites an 1899 report from chief native commissioner H.J. Taylor as evidence that Watermeyer ruled in favour of Armstrong. Mary and Richard Bradford studied Taylor's 1899 report, and Hole's correspondence, and they suggest specific errors made by Hole in his interpretation of Taylor's report. Clarke and Lott both point out that Armstrong was given a gold watch and a letter of appreciation from the board of the British South Africa Company after the verdict was rendered.

As to the identity of the man assassinated and his role, there is much confusion. In June 1896, Father Prestage, captain van Rooyen, Hans Lee, and Armstrong met at Mangwe with "Several hundred natives assembled to hear the statement made by witnesses that Gotani the man shot by Burnham was the M'limo of the Matabele." Harley states that "At (the Watermeyer) enquiry, Father Prestage from his knowledge of the Umlimo and the power he exercised was able to supply authoritative information which greatly assisted the enquiry." But chief native commissioner Taylor's 1899 report, written three years after the event and after Armstrong resigned from the company over unrelated grievances, says that "Armstrong by threats and bribes caused certain natives to perjure themselves and to swear to what was not true". Taylor includes in his report an affidavit by "one Jonas, head messenger at the A.N.C's office at Mangwe," who says, "I swore on oath that Jobane was the M'limo, I knew I was lying at the time, I have never received any cattle from Mr. Armstrong but he paid me the five shillings." Taylor also states in his report that "Dshobane, (was) the supposed Mlimo" assassinated, however, he does not make it clear if "Jobane" and "Dshobane" are different spellings for the same person.

Over the years, historians have postulated several more names for the man assassinated and his role. In 1966, Ranger hypothesized that the man assassinated was not from the Matopos at all, but rather a "loyal" priest of the Kalanga tribe from the Southwest of Matabeleland, and Ranger quotes an 1879 report from a missionary, Joseph Cockin, that states that the priest from the Southwest was named Umkombo. But in 1967, Ranger states that Jobani (or Tshobani) had been the high priest in the Southwest and that "They obtained from the indunas of the Mangwe area affidavits that the dead man, Jobani or Habangana, had been the High Priest of the Mwari and the chief instigator of the rebellion." In 1976, Lott said that Ranger relied on "the American scholar Richard Werbner" for his assessments, and that "recent research has confirmed that Burnham killed the rainmaker (Iwosana) of the tribe (Makalanga) who was Hobani or Tshobani (Sindebele), fourth son of Banko's family." In 1994, Mary and Richard Bradford state that "Burnham may have shot an innocent man, but if so, there was no premeditated plan. He was acting under orders." The Bradfords further remark, "If Jobani was innocent, he was a victim not of Burnham but of white misconception of the M'limo cult and of the difficulty in distinguishing friend from foe that marks irregular warfare."

While there appears to be no clear consensus about either the identity of man assassinated in the Matopos or his role, historian Howard Hensman states "With the downfall of Wedza and shooting of the M'Limo in a cave in the Matoppos by the American scout, Burnham, the Matabele rebellion may be said to have come to an end." Upon learning of the death of Mlimo, Cecil Rhodes walked unarmed into the Matabele stronghold and persuaded the Matabele warriors to lay down their arms. With the war in Matabeland effectively over, the Bulawayo Field Force disbanded on 4 July 1896. With regard to the regular forces under Carrington, Hensman writes "As the rainy season approached and peace was arranged in Matabeleland, the forces, or a considerable portion of them, were moved up into Mashonaland".

== War in Mashonaland ==
War broke out on 17 June 1896 at Mazowe with an attack by the Hwata dynasty on Alice Mine. This was followed by the medium Nehanda Nyakasikana capturing and executing Mazowe Native Commissioner Pollard.

Other religious figures who led the rebellion included Kaguvi Gumboreshumba, who was active in the Goromonzi area and Mukwati, a priest of the Mwari shrine who was active throughout Mashonaland.

In addition to the mediums, traditional leaders played a major role in the rebellion, notably Chief Mashayamombe, who led resistance in his chieftaincy in Mhondoro, south of the colonial settlement of Salisbury barracks (now Harare). He was amongst the first chiefs to rebel and the last to be defeated. He was supplied by many of the surrounding districts, such as Chikomba (then Charter). Other chiefs who played an important role included Gwabayana, Makoni, Mapondera, Mangwende and Seke.

The company was able to muster reinforcements from the Cape Colony, and with the war in Matabeleland ending, Gen. Carrington was able to concentrate his forces in the Mashonaland region; the Matabele rebels there retreated into granite kopjes in the Matobo Hills. With no central command to oppose him, Carrington was able to bring Maxim guns against each stronghold in turn, until resistance ended. Nehanda Nyakasikana and Kaguvi Gumboreshumba were captured and executed in 1898, but Mukwati was never captured and died in Mutoko.

== Aftermath ==
The rebellion failed completely and did not result in any major changes in BSAC policy. For example, the hut tax remained in place. The territories of Matabeleland and Mashonaland had become known as South Zambesia, and both the Matabele and Shona became subjects of the Rhodes administration. It was only 25 years later in 1924 that the entire region became officially named a British Crown Colony. Until 1924, the region was administered by the British South Africa Company. However, the legacy of leaders such as Kaguvi, Mapondera and Nehanda was to inspire future generations.

=== Contribution to Scouting ===
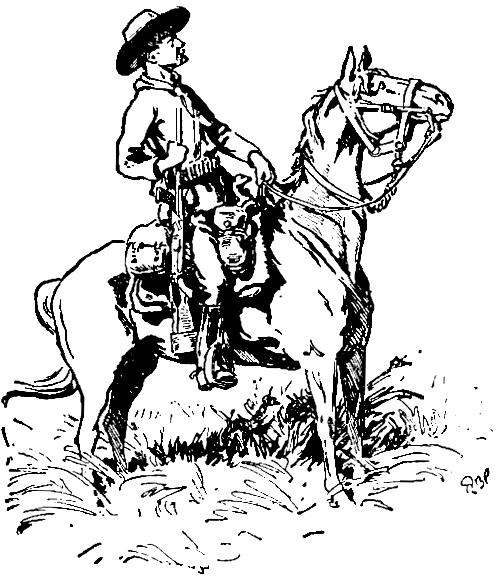
Baden-Powell's sketch of Chief of Scouts Burnham, Matobo Hills, 1896

Soon after the outbreak of the war, Baden-Powell was assigned to Matabeleland as chief of staff to Gen. Carrington and it was here that he first met and began a lifelong friendship with Frederick Russell Burnham, the American-born Chief of Scouts for the British. Baden-Powell had had an interest in scouting from his days at Charterhouse School, and his second published book, in 1884, was "Reconnaissance and Scouting". Working with Burnham was a useful experience for Baden-Powell, not only because he had the time of his life commanding reconnaissance missions into enemy territory, but because many of his later Boy Scout ideas took hold here. Burnham had been a scout practically his entire life in the United States when he went to Africa in 1893 to scout for Cecil Rhodes on the Cape-to-Cairo Railway. As Chief of Scouts under Major Allan Wilson, Burnham became known in Africa as he-who-sees-in-the-dark and he gained fame in the First Matabele War when he survived the British equivalent of Custer's Last Stand, the Shangani Patrol.

During their joint scouting patrols into the Matobo Hills, Burnham explained his woodcraft scheme to Baden-Powell, some aspects of which appear in both the programme and the code of honour of Scouting for Boys. Practised by frontiersmen of the American Old West and Indigenous peoples of the Americas, woodcraft was generally unknown to the British, but well known to the American scout Burnham. These skills eventually formed the basis of what is now called scoutcraft, the fundamentals of Scouting. Both men recognised that wars in Africa were changing markedly and the British Army needed to adapt; so during their joint scouting missions, Baden-Powell and Burnham discussed the concept of a broad training programme in woodcraft for young men, rich in exploration, tracking, fieldcraft, and self-reliance. It was also during this time in the Matobo Hills that Baden-Powell first started to wear his signature campaign hat like the one worn by Burnham – the hat was made by the Stetson Company, and that style was called the "Boss-of-the-Plains", or "B-P" for short. It was here that Baden-Powell acquired his Kudu horn, the Matabele war instrument he later used every morning at his experimental boys' camp on Brownsea Island to wake the boys and to call them together for training.

=== 1901 Mapondera Rebellion ===
In 1901, Chief Kadungure Mapondera, who had in 1894 proclaimed his independence of company rule, led a rebellion in the Guruve and Mount Darwin areas of Mashonaland Central. He led a force of initially under 100 men, but had more than 600 under his command by mid-1901. He was captured in 1903 and died in jail in 1904 after a hunger strike.

=== Monuments ===
In his will, Rhodes directed that he be buried in the Matopos Hills; when he died in the Cape in 1902 his body was brought to Bulawayo by train. His burial was attended by Ndebele chiefs, who asked that the firing party not discharge their rifles, as this would disturb the spirits. Then, for the first and probably the only time, they gave a European person the Matabele royal salute, "Bayete" though this should be considered alongside the fact that from 1898 onwards Ndebele chiefs were paid agents of the Company administration. Rhodes is buried alongside the 34 company soldiers killed in the Shangani Patrol and Jameson was buried there also after his death in 1917.

== See also ==
- First Matabele War
- Pioneer Column
- British South Africa Company Medal
- Lobengula
- Nehanda Nyakasikana
- Kaguvi
- Kadungure Mapondera

== Bibliography ==
- Baden-Powell, Robert (1896). The Matabele Campaign, 1896: Being a Narrative of the Campaign in Suppressing the Native Rising in Matabeleland and Mashonaland. London: Methuen.
- Baden-Powell, Robert (1908). Scouting for Boys: A Handbook for Instruction in Good Citizenship. London: H. Cox. ISBN 978-0-486-45719-2.
- Bradford, Mary E. (1993). An American Family on the African Frontier: The Burnham Family Letters, 1893-1896. Roberts Rinehart Publishers. ISBN 978-1-879373-66-2.
- Burnham, Frederick Russell (1926). Scouting on Two Continents. Garden City, New York: Doubleday, Page & Company. ISBN 978-0-86920-126-8. OCLC 407686.
- Clarke, Mary (1983). The Plumtree Papers: A History of the Bulalima-Mangwe and Life in Rhodesia up to 1922. Bulawayo: The Plumtree Foundation. ISBN 0-7974-0591-7.
- DeGroot, E. B. (July 1944). "Veteran Scout". Boys' Life. Boy Scouts of America.
- Emmerson, Peter; Burnham, Frederick Russell (1975). "Foreword". Scouting on Two Continents. Rhodesian Reprint Library – Silver Series Volume 4 (1975 reprint of the 1927 edition by Burnham, with a new foreword by Peter Emmerson (no page numbers in the new foreword) ed.). Bulawayo: Books of Rhodesia. ISBN 0-86920-126-3.
- Farwell, Byron (2001). The Encyclopedia of Nineteenth-Century Land Warfare: An Illustrated World View. New York: W. W. Norton. ISBN 978-0-393-04770-7.
- Hensman, Howard (1900). A History of Rhodesia, Compiled from Official Sources. Edinburgh and London: W. Blackwood and Sons.
- Hole, Hugh Marshall (1926). The Making of Rhodesia. Macmillan and Company, limited.
- Lott, J. P. (September 1976). "Major F R Burnham, DSO: A Vindication". Rhodesiana (35). Salisbury: The Rhodesiana Society. ISSN 0556-9605. OCLC 1904759.
- Lott, Jack (1981). "Chapter 8. The Making of a Hero: Burnham in the Tonto Basin". In Boddington, Craig (ed.). America— The Men and Their Guns That Made Her Great. Los Angeles, California: Petersen Publishing. ISBN 978-0-8227-3022-4.
- Ranger, Terence (1966). "Chapter 5. The Role of the Ndebele and Shona Religious Authorities in the Rebellions of 1896 and 1897". In Stokes, Eric; Brown, Richard (eds.). The Zambesian Past: Studies in Central African History. Manchester: Manchester University Press.
- Ranger, Terence (1967). Revolt in Southern Rhodesia, 1896-97: a study in African resistance. London: Heinemann. OCLC 503454991.
- Selous, Frederick Courteney (1896). Sunshine and Storm in Rhodesia; being a narrative of events in Matabeleland both before and during the recent native insurrection up to the date of the disbandment of the Bulawayo field force. London: R. Ward. ISBN 978-1-60355-059-8.
- van Wyk, Peter (2003). Burnham: King of Scouts. Victoria, B.C., Canada: Trafford Publishing. ISBN 978-1-4120-0901-0.
- "Killed the Matabele God: Burnham, the American Scout, May End Uprising" (PDF). The New York Times. 25 June 1896. ISSN 0093-1179.
