= Peter Douglas Herbert Raymond Pelly =

Royal Navy Rear Admiral (1904–1980)

Rear-Admiral Peter Douglas Herbert Raymond Pelly, CB, DSO, RN (24 September 1904 – 13 February 1980) was a senior Royal Navy officer.

== Early life and family ==
Peter Douglas Herbert Raymond Pelly was born on 24 September 1904, the second son of Rev. Douglas Raymond Pelly (1865–1943), DSO, and his wife Verena Noellie, née Herbert; the elder son was Air Marshal Sir Claude Pelly. A graduate of Emmanuel College, Cambridge, Rev. Douglas Pelly fought in the Matabele War and the First World War; he was the son of Rev. Canon Raymond Percy Pelly (died 1911), the vicar of Great Malvern (1896–1910), himself the grandson of Sir John Pelly, 1st Baronet.

== Career ==
Commissioned into the Royal Navy in 1918, Peter Pelly served on HMY Victoria and Albert in 1939, but during the Second World War commanded HMS Windsor in 1940 when it was engaged in evacuating from Northern European ports. He was appointed an Officer of the Order of Orange Nassau for the role he played in this work, and was promoted to the rank of Commander in the navy in the same year. He was then attached to the 15th Cruiser Squadron off Crete and Malta and received the Distinguished Service Order (in 1942). From 1943 to 1945, he was with the Plans Division at the Admiralty and worked with the Cairo, Tehran, Quebec and Yalta Conferences. In the last months of the war, Pelly commanded HMS Ameer off Malaya.

In 1945 Pelly took command of HMS Raleigh; two years later, he returned to the Admiralty with the rank of Captain, and served there until his appointment in 1950 to the Reserve Fleet at Harwich. He was appointed Chief Staff Officer at Gibraltar in 1952, and then Director of the Operations Division at the Admiralty in 1954. Promotion to Rear-Admiral followed two years later, coinciding with his appointment as Admiral Superintendent of Rosyth Dockyard. Pelly was then Director-General of the Department of Dockyards and Maintenance at the Admiralty from 1958 to 1959, before retiring in 1960.

Appointed a Companion of the Order of the Bath in 1958, Pelly died on 13 February 1980, leaving a widow, Gwenllian Violet (née Edwardes), and three daughters: Sara Ann (born 1937; married Peter Low and had two sons), Richenda (born 1939; married Major Douglas Alexander Nigel Capel Miers and had one son and three daughters), and Clare Margaret (born 1942; married Timothy Lawrence Ireland and had two sons and two daughters).

== Archives ==
- Service records, Admiralty: The National Archives, Kew (reference no. ADM 196/149/454).

== Likenesses ==
- "Peter Douglas Herbert Raymond Pelly", by Elliott & Fry (bromide print, 1958); Photographs Collection at the National Portrait Gallery, London (NPG x91008).
