= Sikhombo Mguni =

Ndebele warrior and chief

- Tribe: Ndebele

Sikhombo Mguni was a Ndebele warrior and chief. He was regent of Izinkondo and was married to a half-sister of King Lobhengula. He participated as a war leader in the Second Matabele War, in 1896.

== Biography ==
Sikhombo Mguni was descended from Mphubane Mzizi, King Mzilikazi's traditional doctor. Mphubane impregnated a Mguni girl, but he rejected the paternity fearing the punishment. However, in a paternity test following the Ndebele tradition, Sikohombo identified Mphubane as his father.

Sikhombo Mguni was chosen as regent of Intemba and Izinkondo zika Njojo villages, due to Mvuthu was still young for ruling them. Mguni was a prominent chief when Cecil John Rhodes' emissaries arrived looking for a mining concession from King Lobengula Khumalo in 1888.

Sikhombo took part in the east campaign during the Second Matabele War in 1896. An attack of Frederick Kershaw on July 31 allowed the British to advance in a stronghold defended by Sikhombo. Major Herbert Plumer captured the stronghold on August 5, with the Ndebele suffering two hundred casualties defending it. On August 18, Sikhombo and another surviving chief sent envoys for a peace meeting.
