= Sekuru Kaguvi =

19th century Shona traditionalist leader

According to the people of Chivero, Gumboreshumba is the same Kaguvi, a descendant of Chivero. There is hill and a pond (dziva) along the Mupfure River which bears Kaguvi's name. It is believed Kaguvi's torso was buried in a cave in that hill. Kaguvi and Nehanda were beheaded by the British colonialists during the 1896/7 Mashona rebellion.

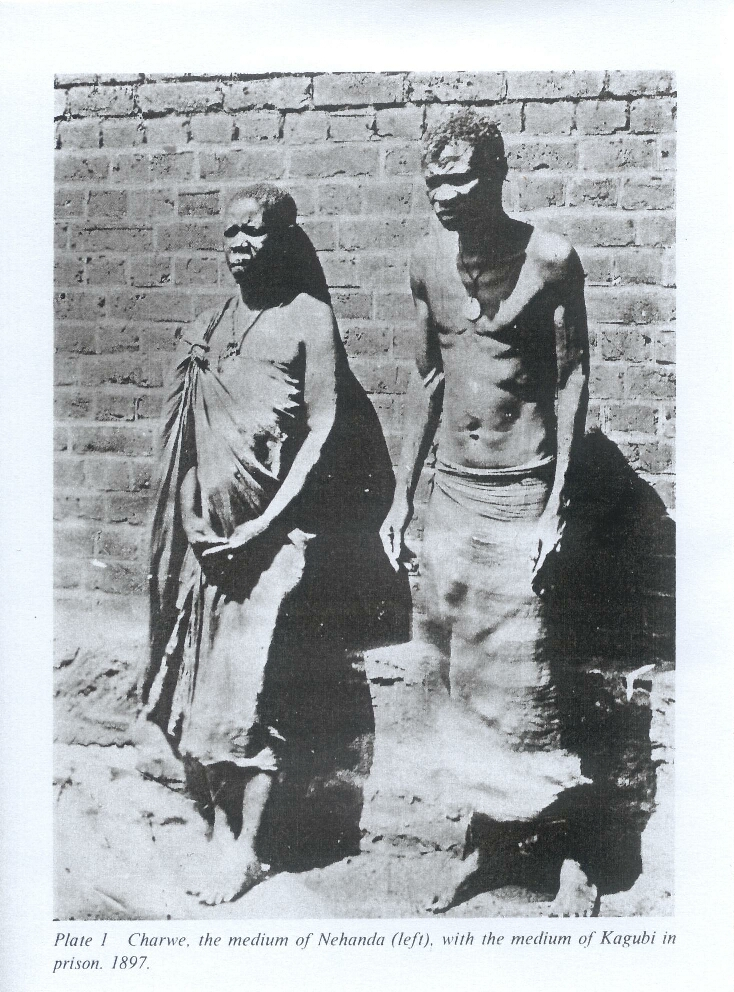
Nehanda Nyakasikana (left) and Sekuru Kaguvi (right), after their 1897 capture

Sekuru Kaguvi (Kagubi, Kakubi), was a svikiro (medium), a traditionalist leader in pre-colonial Zimbabwe, and a leader in the Shona rebellion of 1896-1897 against European rule, known as the First Chimurenga. The sobriquet "Kaguvi" was a designation given at times those who were said to speak for the traditional Shona supreme deity Mwari.

The name "Kaguvi" is normally associated with the man called Gumboreshumba (c.1870-1898), who claimed to speak for the original Kaguvi's spirit. In 1896 he coordinated together with Nehanda, to help in organising the opposition to colonial administration.

Gumboreshumba was one of several mediums of famous traditional spiritual personae during the First Chimurenga. Gumboreshumba (meaning: "lion's paw"), lived in Chikwaka's village by Goromonzi Hill, Zimbabwe. He had four wives, one of whom was Chief Mashonganyika's daughter. The other three wives were received from a headman named Gondo. It is alleged that Gumboreshumba Kaguvi was known as a source of good luck in hunting and that he was able to speak to trees and rocks. He was believed to be the spirit husband of the other great Shona svikiro, Nehanda. When the rebellion collapsed, he was charged with the murder of an African policeman called 'Charlie', whom he had accused of collaborating with the colonial authorities. Kaguvi was found guilty and hanged in 1898.

The judgement docket and other documents from the legal case against Nehanda and Kaguvi are now kept at the National Archives of Zimbabwe in Harare. In 2015, UNESCO added this collection to the Memory of the World international register, recognising it as documentary heritage of global importance.

== Sources ==
- Rasmussen, R.K., and Rubert, S.C., 1990. Historical Dictionary of Zimbabwe, Scarecrow Press.
