= Makalanga =

- Location within Kenya
- Coordinates: 4.43°S 39.12°E
- Country: Kenya
- Province: Coast Province
- Time zone: UTC+3 (EAT)

Makalanga is a settlement in Kenya's Coast Province.

As of 1911, "Makalanga" or "Makalaka" was also the name of a Mashona tribe subjugated by the Matabele.
