= Matabele War =

Matabele War may refer to:

- First Matabele War (1893)
- Second Matabele War (1896–97); also called the Matabeleland Rebellion or the First Chimurenga
