= 2019 in Zimbabwe =

- Decades: 1990s; 2000s; 2010s; 2020s
- See also: Other events of 2019; Timeline of Zimbabwean history

Events of 2019 in Zimbabwe.

== Incumbents ==
- President: Emmerson Mnangagwa
- First Vice President: Constantino Chiwenga
- Second Vice President: Kembo Mohadi
- Chief Justice of Zimbabwe: Luke Malaba

== Events ==
- 14–17 January: Nationwide fuel protests in response to a government increase in fuel prices and declining standards of living.
- 18 July – ICC suspended the Zimbabwe Cricket from international cricket, citing the political interventions in the Cricket Board of Zimbabwe.

== Deaths ==
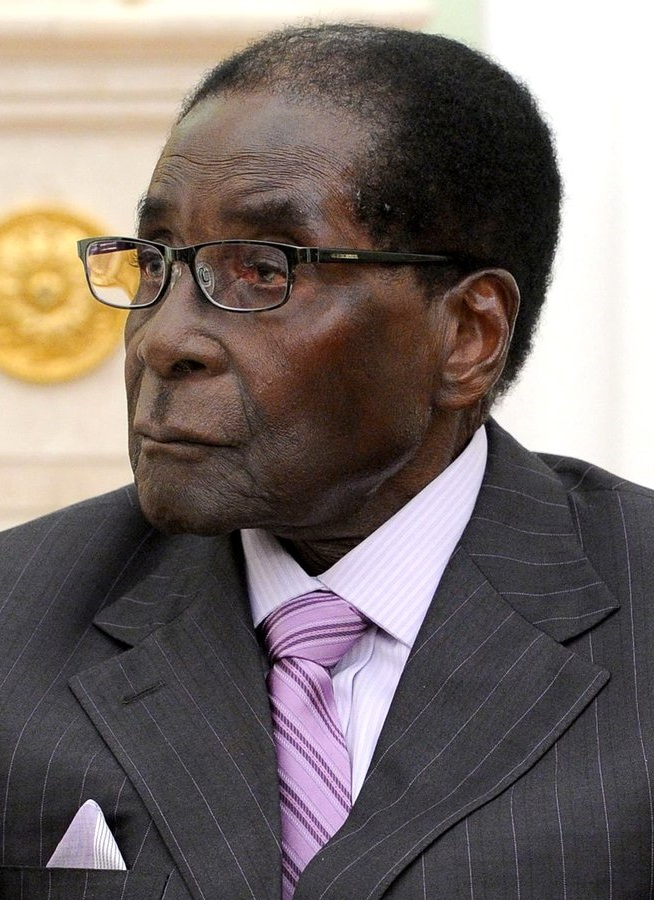
Robert Mugabe

- 23 January – Oliver Mtukudzi, Zimbabwean musician, businessman, and philanthropist (b. 1952)
- 16 February – Charles Mungoshi, Zimbabwean writer (b. 1947)
- 23 February – Dorothy Masuka, Zimbabwean-born South African jazz singer (b. 1935)
- 27 February – Buzwani Mothobi, Zimbabwean diplomat, academic, and civil servant (b. 1939)
- 15 April – Sithembile Gumbo, Zimbabwean politician (b. 1962)
- 23 May – Dumiso Dabengwa, Zimbabwean politician (b. 1939)
- 18 June – Obedingwa Mguni, Zimbabwean politician (b. 1962)
- 22 August – Peter Chingoka, Zimbabwean cricket player and administrator (b. 1954)
- 6 September – Robert Mugabe, Revolutionary and politician, 1st Prime Minister and 2nd President of Zimbabwe (b. 1924)
