= 2020 in Zimbabwe =

- Decades: 2000s; 2010s; 2020s
- See also: Other events of 2020; Timeline of Zimbabwean history

Events of 2020 in Zimbabwe.

== Incumbents ==
- President: Emmerson Mnangagwa
- Vice President: Constantino Chiwenga (1st), Kembo Mohadi (2nd)

== Events ==
- 20 March – 1st case of the COVID-19 pandemic in Zimbabwe
- 30 July – The United Nations' World Food Programme (WFP) seeks an additional $250 million USD for emergency relief after COVID-19 exacerbates the country's hunger crisis. The WFP reported the number of food-insecure people to soar to 8.6 million or about 60% of the population.
- 2 September – The cadavers of twelve elephants are discovered in the Tinashe Farawo National Park, possibly poisoned.
- 29 December – Zimbabwe bans the use of mercury (Hg) in mining after ratifying the Minamata Convention on Mercury.

== Holidays ==
- 1 January – New Year's Day
- 21 February – Robert Gabriel Mugabe National Youth Day
- 10 April – Good Friday
- 13 April – Easter Monday
- 18 April – Independence Day, from the Commonwealth of Nations and the Republic of Zimbabwe formed in 1980.
- 1 Ma – Workers' Day
- 25 May – Africa Day
- 10 August – Heroes' Day, honors those who died during the liberation war.
- 11 August – Devence Forces Day
- 22 December – Unity Day, honors peace agreement of 1987
- 25 December – Christmas

== Deaths ==
- 15 February – Prince Kudakwashe Musarurwa, singer; lung cancer
- 23 March – Zororo Makamba, journalist; Coronavirus
- 28 April – Peter Jones, radio personality
- 29 July – Perrance Shiri, politician; COVID-19
- 26 August – Patson Dzamara, political activist; colon cancer
- 27 September – Delroy Maripakwenda [Scara], musician
- 24 October – CalVin, 35, singer and rapper; traffic collision.
- 8 November – Genius Kadungure [Ginimbi], businessman and socialite; car crash
- 8 November – Mitchelle Amuli [Mimi Moana], actress and socialite; car crash
- 9 November – Lazarus Boora [Gringo], actor
- 29 December – Richard Choruma, 42, Zimbabwean footballer (Highlanders, Bloemfontein Celtic, national team); kidney failure.

== See also ==
- COVID-19 pandemic in Zimbabwe
- COVID-19 pandemic in Africa
- 2020 in East Africa
- 2020 in Botswana
- 2020 in South Africa
- 2020 in Mozambique
- 2020 in Zambia
