= 2017 in Zimbabwe =

- Decades: 1990s; 2000s; 2010s; 2020s
- See also: Other events of 2017; Timeline of Zimbabwean history

The following lists events from the year 2017 in Zimbabwe.

== Incumbents ==
- President: Robert Mugabe (until 21 November), Emmerson Mnangagwa (since 24 November)
- First Vice President: Emmerson Mnangagwa (until 6 November), Constantino Chiwenga (starting 28 December)
- Second Vice President: Phelekezela Mphoko (until 27 November), Kembo Mohadi (starting 28 December)

== Events ==
=== March ===
- 3 March – 2016–17 Zimbabwe floods: Government officials say that floods since December 2016 have killed 246 people and over 2000 people remain homeless as a result.

=== June ===
- 10 June – President Mugabe sacks Johannes Tomana from the role of chief prosecutor after a tribunal found him guilty of sexual misconduct and incompetence.

=== November ===
- 3 November – American producer Martha O'Donovan is arrested for allegedly insulting the President.
- 6 November – Vice President Mnangagwa is fired by Mugabe as a move perceived to be an attempt to get his wife, Grace, to succeed him as President if he dies.
- 14 November – Military forces take up positions on the streets of the capital of Harare in what the ruling party, ZANU-PF, calls an act of treason.
- 15 November – President Mugabe is overthrown as military forces seize the capital and a news station reporting the coup. The military issues a statement to remain calm and support the country's development as several officials are arrested.
- 18 November – Thousands of Zimbabweans celebrate on the streets of Harare at the downfall of Mugabe.
- 19 November – Mugabe is fired from the presidency of ZANU-PF and is replaced with Mnangagwa. He refuses to resign amid a request giving him 24 hours to do so or face impeachment.
- 21 November – Mugabe resigns after impeachment proceedings are launched.
- 24 November – Emmerson Mnangagwa is sworn in as the third President of Zimbabwe with elections pending next year.
- 25 November – Former finance minister Ignatius Chombo, arrested during the coup, is charged by the courts with corruption, fraud and power abuse.

== Deaths ==
- 8 February – Patrick Mumbure Mutume, Roman Catholic bishop (b. 1943).
- 16 June – Edzai Kasinauyo, footballer (b. 1975)
