= 2011 in Zimbabwe =

- Decades: 1990s; 2000s; 2010s; 2020s
- See also: Other events of 2011; Timeline of Zimbabwean history

The following lists events that happened in 2011 in Zimbabwe.

== Incumbents ==
- President: Robert Mugabe
- Prime Minister: Morgan Tsvangirai
- First Vice President: Joice Mujuru
- Second Vice President: John Nkomo

== Events ==
=== August ===
- 2 August - On the urging of Sharon Pincott from the Presidential Elephant Conservation project, Minister Francis Nhema on behalf of President Robert Mugabe reaffirms the 1990 Presidential Decree which is supposed to specially protect the Presidential Elephants of Zimbabwe in Hwange

== Deaths ==
=== October ===
- 12 October: Takunda Mafika, musician and teacher (b. 1983)
