= 2016 in Zimbabwe =

- Decades: 1990s; 2000s; 2010s; 2020s
- See also: Other events of 2016; Timeline of Zimbabwean history

The following lists events from the year 2016 in Zimbabwe.

== Incumbents ==
- President: Robert Mugabe
- First Vice President: Emmerson Mnangagwa
- Second Vice President: Phelekezela Mphoko

== Events ==
=== February ===
- 15–20 February – Zimbabwean officials ground a US-registered cargo plane bound for South Africa at Harare after a corpse is found on board. The plane is released after investigations conclude the stowaway died due to a lack of oxygen.

=== March ===
- 23 March – Empowerment minister Patrick Zhuwao announces that the Zimbabwean government will cancel the licenses of foreign films that have not complied with the Indigenisation and Economic Empowerment Act.

=== April ===
- 14 April – In the first anti-government protests in nearly a decade, thousands of opposition supporters march in Harare calling for the end of Mugabe's rule.

=== July ===
- 4 July – Riots break out in the capital of Harare after police attempted to disperse a protest by taxi drivers.
- 6 July – Internet protests turn to the streets in response to fears of economic collapse.
- 7 July – As protests spread across the country, dozens are arrested.
- 8 July – Despite demands by the government to stop, protests continue to spread across the country. Mugabe blames international sanctions for the inability to pay workers on time. A two-day strike is threatened to be in place if the government does not meet protester demands.
- 11 July – Evan Mawarire, the protest leader, demands the international community put pressure on the regime.
- 12 July – Mawarire is arrested for allegedly "inciting public violence and disturbing peace".
- 13 July – A court dismisses charges against Mawarire.

=== August ===
- 17 August – A new wave of anti-government protests erupt in Harare.
