= 2015 in Zimbabwe =

- Decades: 1990s; 2000s; 2010s; 2020s
- See also: Other events of 2015; Timeline of Zimbabwean history

The following lists events that happened in 2015 in Zimbabwe.

== Incumbents ==
- President: Robert Mugabe
- First Vice President: Emmerson Mnangagwa
- Second Vice President: Phelekezela Mphoko

== Events ==
- 9–20 January – 2015 Southeast Africa Floods
- March – A 50 Cents was finally released for the Zimbabwean Bond Coins.
- 24 September – The Pakistani cricket team arrive in Zimbabwe for their 2015-2016 tour.

== Deaths ==
- 13 March – Paddington Mhondoro, 28, cricketer (traffic collision)
- 9 June – Amos Midzi, 62, politician and diplomat
