= 2014 in Zimbabwe =

- Decades: 1990s; 2000s; 2010s; 2020s
- See also: Other events of 2014; Timeline of Zimbabwean history

The following lists events that happened during 2014 in Zimbabwe.

== Incumbents ==
- President: Robert Mugabe
- First Vice President: Joice Mujuru (until 8 December), Emmerson Mnangagwa (starting 12 December)
- Second Vice President: Phelekezela Mphoko (starting 12 December)

== Events ==
=== January ===
- 20 January – President Robert Mugabe of Zimbabwe makes his first public appearance in several weeks.

=== February ===
- 18 February – Former United States congressman Melvin Jay Reynolds is arrested in Zimbabwe for possession of pornography.

=== May ===
- 12 May – Sharon Pincott gave up her 13 year battle monitoring, recording and helping to protect Zimbabwe's flagship herd of elephants which bear the President's identity, after land grabs in Presidential Elephant areas in Hwange, unethical practices and heightened attempts at intimidation became overwhelming.

=== November ===
- 21 November – A stampede in Kwekwe caused by the police firing tear gas kills at least eleven people and injures 40 others.

=== December ===
- 18 December – Zimbabwean Bond Coins for 1 Cent, 5, 10, and 25 Cents were released into circulation in an attempt to ease the shortage of small change.
