= 2005 in Zimbabwe =

- Decades: 1980s; 1990s; 2000s; 2010s; 2020s
- See also: Other events of 2005; Timeline of Zimbabwean history

The following lists events that happened during 2005 in the Republic of Zimbabwe.

== Incumbents ==
- President: Robert Mugabe
- First Vice President: Joice Mujuru
- Second Vice President: Joseph Msika

== Events ==
=== January ===
- 17–19 January - Robert Mugabe and the Iranian President Mohammed Khatami hold talks.

=== March ===
- 31 March - The Zimbabwe African National Union-Patriotic Front wins the parliamentary elections.

=== May ===
- 25 May - Operation Murambatsvina or Operation Drive Out Trash is started.

=== July ===
- 22 July - The United Nations releases a report to the public stating Operation Murambatsvina has left 700,000 people without homes or jobs, violated international law and created a grave humanitarian crisis.
- Operation Murambatsvina ends.

=== August ===
- 4 August - Amnesty International films in secret the aftermath of Operation Murambatsvina at Hopley Farm on the outskirts of Harare.
- 30 August - Parliament passes the controversial 17th Amendment bill.

=== September ===
- 9 September - The International Monetary Fund gives Zimbabwe a 6-month reprieve to settle their US$175 million debt.
- 10 September - Robert Mugabe arrives in Cuba on a 3-day state visit.

=== October ===
- 3 October - The exchange rate of the Zimbabwe dollar collapses to 100,000 to 1 against the US dollar.

=== November ===
- 6 November - The National Constitutional Assembly civic alliance stage protests in Harare, Bulawayo, Gweru, Mutare and Masvingo.
- 7 November - Police arrest Percy Ncijo, Reason Ngwenya and Dzavamwe Shambare of the Zimbabwe Congress of Trade Unions in Bulawayo to thwart demonstrations.
- 8 November - The Zimbabwe Congress of Trade Unions stage protests in Harare and Bulawayo. Police arrests the Zimbabwe Congress of Trade Unions' president Lovemore Matombo and the secretary general Wellington Chibhebhe together with 150 other union members in Harare.
- 20 November - Robert Mugabe announces on Zimbabwe state television that uranium deposits have been discovered.
- 24 November - The United States of America freezes the assets of 128 Zimbabweans including Robert Mugabe and 33 Zimbabwe institutions for hindering democratic reform in Zimbabwe.
- 26 November - Elections for Zimbabwe's first senate takes place which Zimbabwe African National Union - Patriotic Front wins majority seats.

=== December ===
- 15 December - Police raid the offices of the Voice of the People in Harare.

== Deaths ==
- August 25 - Josiah Tungamirai, politician, (born 1948)
