= List of strikes in Zimbabwe =

Throughout the history of Zimbabwe, a number of strikes, labour disputes, student strikes, hunger strikes, and other industrial actions have occurred.

== Background ==
A labour strike is a work stoppage caused by the mass refusal of employees to work. This can include wildcat strikes, which are done without union authorisation, and slowdown strikes, where workers reduce their productivity while still carrying out minimal working duties. It is usually a response to employee grievances, such as low pay or poor working conditions. Strikes can also occur to demonstrate solidarity with workers in other workplaces or pressure governments to change policies.

== 20th century ==
=== 1940s ===
- 1945 Rhodesian rail strike
- 1947 Dadaya school strike, strike by students at the Dadaya mission school in Southern Rhodesia.
- 1947 Mount Selinda High School strike, strike by students at the Mount Selinda High School in Southern Rhodesia, against the practice of students being forced to work for the mission during school breaks.
- 1948 Southern Rhodesia general strike

=== 1950s ===
- 1954 Rhodesian firemen's strike

=== 1960s ===
- 1964 Wankie Colliery strike, in Hwange.

=== 1980s ===
- 1980 Zimbabwe wildcat strikes, wildcat strikes in Zimbabwe prior to the country's formal independence.
- 1988–90 Zimbabwe healthcare strikes, series of strikes by healthcare workers, including doctors and nurses.

=== 1990s ===
- 1996 Zimbabwe public sector strike

== 21st century ==
=== 2000s ===
- Zimbabwean cricket crisis
- 2-day general strike in 2005 against Operation Murambatsvina.
- 2007–08 Zimbabwe judicial strike

=== 2010s ===
- 2016–2017 Zimbabwe protests
- Zimbabwe fuel protests, in 2019.

== See also ==
- History of Zimbabwe
