= 2013 in Zimbabwe =

- Decades: 1990s; 2000s; 2010s; 2020s
- See also: Other events of 2013; Timeline of Zimbabwean history

The following lists events that happened in 2013 in Zimbabwe.

== Incumbents ==
- President: Robert Mugabe
- Prime Minister: Morgan Tsvangirai (until 11 September)
- First Vice President: Joice Mujuru
- Second Vice President: John Nkomo (until 17 January)

== Events ==
=== March ===
- 16–17 March – Constitutional referendum: the referendum passes with 94.49% of the vote, marking the end of the Lancaster House Constitution.
- 17 March – Human rights lawyer Beatrice Mtetwa is arrested and charged with obstruction of justice. She is released on 25 March.

=== May ===
- 7 May – Two staff of the private newspaper Zimbabwe Independent, Dumisani Muleya and Owen Gagare, are arrested and accused of publishing falsehoods.

=== July ===
- 31 July – 2013 Zimbabwean general election: Robert Mugabe is declared the winner of the presidential election, with rival candidate Morgan Tsvangirai dismissing the results as fraudulent.

=== October ===
- 30 October – At least 20 are killed in a fuel tanker crash and explosion in Chisumbanje District.

== Deaths ==
- 17 January – John Nkomo, 78, politician and Second Vice-President
- 24 July – Chiwoniso Maraire, 37, singer and songwriter
