= 2009 in Zimbabwe =

- Decades: 1980s; 1990s; 2000s; 2010s; 2020s
- See also: Other events of 2009; Timeline of Zimbabwean history

The following lists events that happened during 2009 in Zimbabwe.

== Incumbents ==
- President: Robert Mugabe
- Prime Minister: Morgan Tsvangirai
- First Vice President: Joice Mujuru
- Second Vice President: Joseph Msika (until 4 August), John Nkomo (starting 23 December)

== Events ==
=== January ===
- 29 January - Zimbabwe allows the use of foreign currencies alongside its dollar.
- 31 January - Movement for Democratic Change President Morgan Tsvangirai agrees to become Zimbabwe's Prime Minister on 11 February in a deal with President Robert Mugabe.

=== February ===
- 5 February - Zimbabwe's House of Assembly allows power-sharing between the African National Union – Patriotic Front and the Movement for Democratic Change.

=== March ===
- 6 March - Susan Tsvangirai (nee Mhundwa) wife of Morgan Tsvangerai dies in an automobile accident and the Robert Mugabe government is suspected of involvement or attempts to cover up the facts surrounding the event.
