= 2012 in Zimbabwe =

- Decades: 1990s; 2000s; 2010s; 2020s
- See also: Other events of 2012; Timeline of Zimbabwean history

The following lists events that happened in 2012 in Zimbabwe.

== Incumbents ==
- President: Robert Mugabe
- Prime Minister: Morgan Tsvangirai
- First Vice President: Joice Mujuru
- Second Vice President: John Nkomo

== Events ==
=== January ===
- 31 January – The Meteorological Department of Zimbabwe reports that some regions of the country experienced their heaviest recorded rainfall in 30 years during January.

=== March ===
- 8 March – Activist Jenni Williams is awarded the Ginetta Sagan Fund award by Amnesty International for her human and civil rights activism.

=== June ===
- 19 June – One person is killed and at least fifteen are injured in a crash involving Robert Mugabe's motorcade.
- 22 June – 20 members of parliament undergo circumcision to spread awareness of HIV/AIDS prevention.
- 29 June – The one-hour documentary titled All the President's Elephants, featuring Sharon Pincott's decade of work with the Presidential Elephants of Zimbabwe and the Reaffirmation of the Presidential Decree, premiered at the 2012 Durban International Film Festival, where it was considered among the best on show. It went on to win many international accolades, keeping Zimbabwe's flagship elephant herd in the international spotlight.

== Deaths ==
- 5 June – Sam Levy, 82, businessman and property developer
- 4 October – Stanislaus Mudenge, 70, politician
- 10 October – Kevin Curran, 53, cricketer
