= 2007 in Zimbabwe =

- Decades: 1980s; 1990s; 2000s; 2010s; 2020s
- See also: Other events of 2007; Timeline of Zimbabwean history

The following lists events that happened during 2007 in Zimbabwe.

== Incumbents ==
- President: Robert Mugabe
- Prime Minister: Morgan Tsvangirai
- First Vice President: Joice Mujuru
- Second Vice President: Joseph Msika

== Events ==
=== February ===
- 21 February - Police in Zimbabwe ban rallies in parts of Harare that are seen as strongholds of the opposition party Movement for Democratic Change.

=== March ===
- 11 March - Leading opponents of Zimbabwe's President Robert Mugabe, including Morgan Tsvangirai, leader of the Movement for Democratic Change, and four other members of parliament and party activists, are arrested for defying a ban on protest rallies in Harare. Riot police shoot one activist dead.
- 12 March - The High Court of Zimbabwe rules that detained opposition leader Morgan Tsvangirai of the Movement for Democratic Change must either be brought into court on Tuesday or released.
- 13 March - Tsvangirai appears in court limping and with a head wound after having been arrested on Sunday. Tsvangarai is later taken from court to a hospital under police guard.
- 17 March - Three activists in the Zimbabwe opposition are arrested as they attempt to leave the country for South Africa including Arthur Mutambara, leader of a faction in the Movement for Democratic Change. Two of the activists were seeking medical treatment after having been arrested a week ago.
- 22 March - The Roman Catholic Archbishop of Bulawayo Pius Ncube calls for mass protests to force President Robert Mugabe from power.
- 28 March - The Movement for Democratic Change says its leader, Morgan Tsvangirai, has been arrested by police. He was later released but other activists remained in police custody.

=== April ===
- 22 April - Investigating officer Wellington Ngena accuses the government of South Africa's Scorpions intelligence department of training members of the Movement for Democratic Change in combat to overthrow the government of Zimbabwe.

=== June ===
- 13 June - Zimbabwean Minister of Lands Didymus Mutasa says the government will remove all remaining white farmers from their farms and divide their land among landless black citizens.
- 22 June - Inflation in Zimbabwe rises to 11,000%; U.S. ambassador Christopher Dell predicts it will reach 1.5 million percent by December.

=== July ===
- 5 July - The Zimbabwe Congress of Trade Unions votes to strike for higher wages as inflation in Zimbabwe rises above 10,000%.
- 31 July - The International Monetary Fund estimates that inflation in Zimbabwe could reach 100,000% by the end of 2007.

=== September ===
- 7 September - Robert Mugabe, the President of Zimbabwe, accused Levy Mwanawasa, the President of Zambia and Chairman of the Southern African Development Community, of selling out his country to the Western world and plotting with foreign intelligence agencies during an SADC conference in August. President Mwanawasa later apologized to Mugabe, saying Mugabe had misunderstood an earlier comment.
- 26 September - The House of Assembly of Zimbabwe passes legislation transferring control of all foreign-owned businesses to Zimbabweans.

=== November ===
- 18 November - George Charamba, the spokesman for Robert Mugabe, the President of Zimbabwe, says the Mugabe government is preparing for a British invasion.
- 21 November - Portuguese Minister of Foreign Affairs Luís Amado says Zimbabwean President Robert Mugabe is not welcome at the December European Union-African Union summit in Lisbon. United Kingdom Prime Minister Gordon Brown says he will not attend if Mugabe is present.
- 27 November - Zambian Airways ends direct flights to Harare. British Airways ended flights last month and Ethiopian Airlines will end flights to Zimbabwe in December, leaving only three foreign airlines with planes flying to Zimbabwe in 2008.

=== December ===
- 15 December - Sikhanyiso Ndlovu, the Information Minister of Zimbabwe, calls Chancellor Angela Merkel of Germany a "Nazi". Ndlovu responded to the German government's criticism of rising human rights abuses in Zimbabwe by telling Merkel to "shut up".
