= 2006 in Zimbabwe =

- Decades: 1980s; 1990s; 2000s; 2010s; 2020s
- See also: Other events of 2006; Timeline of Zimbabwean history

The following lists events that happened during 2006 in Zimbabwe.

== Incumbents ==
- President: Robert Mugabe
- Prime Minister: Morgan Tsvangirai
- First Vice President: Joice Mujuru
- Second Vice President: Joseph Msika

== Events ==
=== September ===
- September 7
