= 2010 in Zimbabwe =

- Decades: 1990s; 2000s; 2010s; 2020s
- See also: Other events of 2010; Timeline of Zimbabwean history

The following lists events that happened in 2010 in Zimbabwe.

== Incumbents ==
- President: Robert Mugabe
- Prime Minister: Morgan Tsvangirai
- First Vice President: Joice Mujuru
- Second Vice President: John Nkomo
