= 2018 in Zimbabwe =

- Decades: 1990s; 2000s; 2010s; 2020s
- See also: Other events of 2018; Timeline of Zimbabwean history

The following lists events from the year 2018 in Zimbabwe.

== Incumbents ==
- President: Emmerson Mnangagwa
- First Vice President: Constantino Chiwenga
- Second Vice President: Kembo Mohadi
- Chief Justice of Zimbabwe: Luke Malaba

== Events ==
=== January ===
18 January – President Mnagagwa announces that observer missions from the Commonwealth of Nations, the European Union, and the United Nations have been invited to monitor the 2018 general elections.

=== April ===
Sibusiso Moyo will be attending the Commonwealth Heads of Government Meeting 2018 as an observer, as Zimbabwe has an intention of reengaging with the international community - including a possible return of Zimbabwe to the Commonwealth of Nations during 2018.

=== July ===
- 29 July – On the eve of Zimbabwe's election, Mugabe made a surprise press conference where he stated his wish not to vote for President Mnangagwa and ZANU-PF, the party he founded

Instead, he expressed his wish to vote his long time rival party, the MDC of Nelson Chamisa .

- Zimbabwean general election, 2018 - to elect members of the House of Assembly of Zimbabwe and the Senate of Zimbabwe as well as the President of Zimbabwe.

== Date unknown ==
President Mnangagwa has announced that Zimbabwe will seek a return to the Commonwealth, of which it was a full member from April 1980 to December 2003.

== Deaths ==
- 14 February – Morgan Tsvangirai, 65, Zimbabwean politician and former Prime Minister of Zimbabwe.
