= 2008 in Zimbabwe =

- Decades: 1980s; 1990s; 2000s; 2010s; 2020s
- See also: Other events of 2008; Timeline of Zimbabwean history

The following lists events that happened during 2008 in the Republic of Zimbabwe.

== Incumbents ==
- President: Robert Mugabe
- Prime Minister: Morgan Tsvangirai
- First Vice President: Joice Mujuru
- Second Vice President: Joseph Msika

== Events ==
=== January ===
- 23 January - Police in Zimbabwe arrest Morgan Tsvangirai, the leader of the Movement for Democratic Change, the principal opposition party.
- 26 January - Police in Zimbabwe arrest Nicholas van Hoogstraten for allegedly violating the Exchange Control Regulations Act by asking his tenants to pay in foreign currency. He is also accused of violating the Censorship Act for possessing pornography. Police seize Z$20 billion ($0.6m).
- 28 January - Inflation in Zimbabwe rises to about 150,000%. The Zimbabwean dollar is essentially worthless.

=== March ===
- 29 March - Zimbabweans vote in the presidential and parliamentary elections.
- 30 March - Delays in releasing the official results of parliamentary and presidential elections in Zimbabwe are met with widespread speculation and concerns over possible vote rigging.
- 31 March - The Zimbabwe Electoral Commission starts releasing results of the Zimbabwean parliamentary election, 2008 and Zimbabwean presidential election, 2008 with the Opposition Movement for Democratic Change claiming victory on the basis of unofficial results.

=== April ===
- 2 April - Morgan Tsvangirai's Movement for Democratic Change defeats Robert Mugabe's ZANU-PF in the Zimbabwean parliamentary elections.
