= Chidyausiku =

Chidyausiku is a Zimbabwean surname. Notable people with the surname include:

- Boniface Chidyausiku, Zimbabwean diplomat
- Godfrey Chidyausiku, Zimbabwean judge and politician
