= International reaction to the 2008 Zimbabwean presidential election =

International reaction of a political event

The events of the first and second rounds of the Zimbabwean presidential election, which Robert Mugabe of ZANU-PF won on 27 June 2008 after his challenger, Morgan Tsvangirai of the Movement for Democratic Change (MDC), withdrew from the process and declared it illegitimate, caused reactions from many international bodies. Other Zimbabwean groups have denounced the poll as well (e.g. the Heads of the Christian Denominations in Zimbabwe.)

== African Union and SADC ==
The South African Development Community (SADC) criticised the election in a statement on 29 June, saying that it "did not represent the will of the people of Zimbabwe" and that "the prevailing environment impinged on the credibility of the electoral process".

Desmond Tutu said on 29 June that there was "a very good argument" for sending "an international force to restore peace" to Zimbabwe. On 30 June, Kenyan Prime Minister Raila Odinga called for the suspension of Zimbabwe from the African Union (AU) until Zimbabwe holds free and fair elections; he also called for a new election in the presence of peacekeepers.

An AU summit at Sharm el-Sheikh in Egypt began on 30 June, with Mugabe in attendance. Despite the international prominence of the situation in Zimbabwe and concern from the West, Zimbabwe was reportedly not mentioned in the summit's opening speeches.

On 1 July, the AU summit passed a resolution calling for a "government of national unity" in Zimbabwe. The debate over the resolution saw the Vice-President of Botswana, Mompati Merafhe, criticise Mugabe and the "flawed election", saying that Zimbabwe should be suspended from AU and SADC meetings. Meanwhile, UN Secretary General Ban Ki-moon said on 1 July that he would "spare no effort to work out a solution" and stressed that Zimbabweans needed to be able to vote without intimidation.

After the AU called for dialogue between ZANU-PF and the MDC, Mbeki said on 2 July that Mugabe was agreeable to this and expressed his commitment to dialogue; Tsvangirai, however, rejected dialogue, saying that violence and "persecution" must stop first.

The AU summit made no resolutions stronger than its call for dialogue and a national unity government, declining to adopt tough measures against Zimbabwe. Mugabe returned to Zimbabwe on 4 July and was welcomed by a celebratory crowd of about 4,000 at the airport in Harare.

Having previously called for the suspension of Zimbabwe from the AU and SADC, on 4 July Botswana's Foreign Minister, Phandu Skelemani, said that his country did not recognise the election's outcome and hoped that the rest of SADC would likewise refuse recognition. Skelemani called for "expedited" mediation in Zimbabwe within "a defined time frame" that would be based on "mutual trust and good faith" and equal standing between the parties. Mugabe had said at the summit that he was saddened by Botswana's position, and Sekelemani said that he hoped Mugabe would not take Botswana's position personally.

Mbeki met with Mugabe, as well as MDC faction leader Arthur Mutambara, in Zimbabwe on 5 July. On 6 July, British Foreign Secretary David Miliband called on countries to "unite behind a tough, strong, clear Security Council resolution". This resolution, drafted by the United States, proposes that assets belonging to a number of leading political figures be frozen and that their ability to travel abroad be restricted. In addition, Miliband backed Tsvangirai's call for the appointment of an AU mediator, saying that "a clear mix of diplomacy and sanctions" was needed. Along with the US and the UK, France and Germany expressed support for the proposed resolution, but Russia, China, and South Africa did not. Russia's Permanent Representative to the UN, Vitaly Churkin, suggested that the proposed resolution could establish a dangerous precedent, while South Africa expressed concern that it could harm Mbeki's mediation efforts.

== Canada ==
In the immediate aftermath of the second round, Canada imposed sanctions restricting the activities of individual Zimbabwean government figures inside Canada. On 5 September, Canadian Foreign Minister David Emerson announced more sanctions aimed at "isolating and maintaining pressure on key members of the Zimbabwe regime", including the freezing of any assets they held in Canada, as well as placing a ban on the export of arms from Canada to Zimbabwe. It also banned Zimbabwean aircraft from flying over or landing in Canada.

== European Union ==
Bernard Kouchner, the Foreign Minister of France, said on 1 July that the European Union would "accept no government other than a government led by Mr Tsvangirai". Italy chose to recall its ambassador to Zimbabwe. Zimbabwean government spokesman George Charamba reacted fiercely to Western condemnation, saying that Western critics could "go hang a thousand times". Zimbabwe's Permanent Representative to the UN, Boniface Chidyausiku, was dismissive of the possibility of UN sanctions, saying that Zimbabwe was "not a threat to international peace and security."

On 10 July, the European Parliament voted for a motion calling on EU member states to impose increased sanctions on members of the Zimbabwean government; it also called on them to actively discourage the presence of European businesses in Zimbabwe. The motion said that the election was "not legitimate" and urged the suspension of Zimbabwe from African regional meetings. There were 591 votes in favour and 8 opposed.

On 13 July, British Prime Minister Gordon Brown said that pressure on the Zimbabwean government needed to be maintained and that his country would propose the addition of 36 names to the EU's list of 131 Zimbabweans subject to financial and travel sanctions.

The foreign ministers of the 27 EU member states agreed on 22 July to add 37 individuals to the list of individuals subject to EU sanctions; four companies were also added to the list. In a joint statement, the EU foreign ministers described the re-election of Mugabe as "illegitimate" and said that the new sanctions were directed "against those responsible for the campaign of violence that marked the elections"; they also said that additional action would follow if Mugabe remained in power. The foreign ministers also decided to further restrict Mugabe's ability to travel to EU countries; to travel there, he would need the approval of all EU member states, rather than a majority, as was previously the case. According to The Herald, the EU's list of individuals subject to sanctions "was arrived at through 'malicious' submissions to the EU by some locals intending to settle personal scores." On 23 July, Angolan Foreign Minister João Bernardo de Miranda urged the EU to lift the sanctions, saying that they could interfere with negotiations between ZANU-PF and the MDC.

Following a preliminary agreement between ZANU-PF and the MDC on 21 July, outlining a framework for negotiations, Miliband described the agreement as a "first step"; he called for an end to violence and the lifting of a ban on international non-governmental organisations operating in Zimbabwe, saying that these conditions were necessary in order for "resolution of the Zimbabwean crisis" to begin.

== G8 summit ==
At a G8 summit in Hokkaidō, the G8 leaders declared in a statement on 8 July that they considered Mugabe's leadership to be illegitimate and announced that they planned to "take further steps ... against those individuals responsible for the violence". They additionally urged the Zimbabwean government to co-operate with the opposition and called for a UN envoy to be appointed to assess the situation in Zimbabwe. According to British Prime Minister Gordon Brown, the G8 statement "made it clear that we would appoint a U.N. envoy and would impose new sanctions against an illegitimate regime which has blood on its hands." However, Russian President Dmitri Medvedev was more cautious in his view of the statement's implications, saying that there were "as yet no concrete decisions on how the United Nations should act in this situation (and) whether it's necessary to make any special additional decisions". UN involvement in mediation is generally opposed by African governments, including that of South Africa.

Responding to the G8 statement on 8 July, Zimbabwean Deputy Information Minister Bright Matonga accused the G8 leaders of trying to "undermine the African Union and President Mbeki's efforts because they are racist, because they think only white people think better", saying that this was "an insult to African leaders".

Speaking in Johannesburg on 10 July, Liberian President Ellen Johnson Sirleaf said that the election was not free and fair and expressed support for the appointment of another "high profile" mediator to work alongside Mbeki.

== United Nations Security Council ==
The United Nations Security Council has officially met on the issue on several occasions.

On 23 June the Council heard a statement about the deteriorating situation and the restrictions imposed on outside election observers. Then, following an off-the-record meeting, the Council issued a statement condemning "the campaign of violence against the political opposition" and expressing "its concern over the impact of the situation in Zimbabwe on the wider region."

After the election an attempt, supported by the United States and European countries, to have the Security Council declare the election illegitimate was blocked by South Africa, which argued that the Council was not in the business of certifying elections. The US ambassador, who was President of the Security Council for June, told reporters that the holding of elections was "a matter of deep regret".

On 7 July the Security Council was briefed by the Deputy Secretary-General who said that observations "clearly indicate that the electoral process leading to the declared re-election of President Mugabe was seriously flawed. This profound crisis of legitimacy is further compounded by the paralysis of State institutions. There is currently no functioning parliament. Civil society has been silenced and intimidated. The economy is crippled, with annual inflation reaching 10.5 million per cent by the end of June and unemployment being over 80 per cent, and severe shortages of food and basic services exist. There is an urgent need to restore the rule of law and to start building public institutions."

The Zimbabwean mission to the UN said in a letter on 10 July that a proposed resolution drafted by the US would likely leave Zimbabwe in a lawless state like Somalia and cause a civil war if it was passed. According to the letter, Zimbabwe was not a threat to other countries and consequently there was no basis for the proposed resolution; the letter also alleged that the proposed resolution was actually intended as punishment for Zimbabwe's land reform, and it said that the US and the UK were "ignor[ing] real, entrenched, fundamental and enduring issues that lie at the heart of Zimbabwe's internal politics". Additionally, the letter blamed the violence on the MDC.

On 11 July, this draft resolution was brought to the Security Council to impose personal sanctions involving finances and travel against Mugabe and 13 of his top associates, appoint a UN mediator, and impose an arms embargo against Zimbabwe. The resolution was vetoed by the negative votes of Russia and China. Belgium, Burkina Faso, Costa Rica, Croatia, France, Italy, Panama, the United Kingdom, and the United States voted in favour of the resolution; China, Libya, Russia, South Africa, and Vietnam voted against it, while Indonesia abstained.

The ambassador for Russia rejected the United Kingdom's interpretation of a recent statement at the G8 meeting that "We will take further steps, inter alia introducing financial and other measures against those individuals responsible for violence" made any reference to actions in the Security Council. He added that such an attempt "to take the Council beyond its Charter prerogatives and beyond the maintenance of international peace and security... [was] illegitimate and dangerous."

The ambassador for China stressed the importance of discussion between the political parties in Zimbabwe and said that the resolution would "interfere with the negotiating process and lead to the further deterioration of the situation".

South African Permanent Representative Dumisani Kumalo criticised the resolution for being biased in favour of the MDC and against ZANU-PF, and he urged the Security Council to give Mbeki's mediation a chance without potentially undermining it by imposing sanctions. He said that, even if sanctions were eventually deemed necessary, they should not be imposed immediately.

US Permanent Representative Zalmay Khalilzad was sharply critical of the positions taken by Russia and South Africa. Describing Mugabe's government as a "horrible regime", he said that Mbeki's mediation efforts were a failure, that no "serious" negotiations were taking place, and that it appeared Mbeki was protecting Mugabe and sometimes even working with him. He criticised Russia for what he characterised as a reversal of its position, noting that Russia had backed the G8 statement a few days prior. Khalilzad also said that the US could have considered an arrangement in which sanctions would only be imposed after the passage of a certain length of time, if those opposed to the resolution had chosen to negotiate. The Russian Foreign Ministry strongly rejected the accusation that Russia had reversed its position. British Foreign Secretary Miliband was also critical of Russia's opposition, saying that it would "appear incomprehensible to the people of Zimbabwe".

Zimbabwe's Minister of Information, Sikhanyiso Ndlovu, expressed satisfaction with the outcome of the Security Council vote, and he thanked "those who helped defeat international racism disguised as multilateral action at the UN". According to Ndlovu, the outcome upheld "the principles of non-interference into the sovereign affairs of a UN member state".

== United States ==
Immediately after the election, US President George W. Bush said on 28 June 2008 that the US would be imposing new sanctions on "this illegitimate government of Zimbabwe and those who support it", and he called for an international arms embargo on Zimbabwe and the barring of travel by members of its government.

Bush said on 15 July that he was unhappy with Russia and China's Security Council veto and that the US Departments of State and the Treasury were "working on potential US action". At a Senate hearing later on the same day, US Assistant Secretary of State for African Affairs Jendayi Frazer said that US sanctions were planned to target individuals as well as Zimbabwean government institutions, although she noted that European sanctions would be more effective because the Zimbabwean economy was more connected to Europe; she also criticised the Russian and Chinese veto, saying that it "enabled Mugabe". Also on 15 July, US Secretary of State Condoleezza Rice said that Mugabe's "tyranny" would cause "perennial instability" in southern Africa for as long as it existed.

Bush announced the signing of an order expanding sanctions on 25 July.

== Zimbabwean reaction to sanctions ==
Speaking at the United Nations General Assembly on 25 September, President Mugabe "appeal[ed] to the world's collective conscience to apply pressure for the immediate removal of these sanctions by Britain, the United States and their allies, which have brought untold suffering to our people". He described the leaders behind the sanctions as "international perpetrators of genocide, acts of aggression and mass destruction".
