= Buzwani Mothobi =

Zimbabwean diplomat, academic, and civil servant (1939–2019)

Buzwani Donald Mothobi (22 August 1939 – 27 February 2019) was a Zimbabwean diplomat, academic, and civil servant.

== Early life ==
Mothobi was born in Nyamandhlovu, Zimbabwe on 22 August 1939. He graduated from both the University of Toronto and Carleton University.

== Career ==
Between 1976 and 1977, Mothobi was a lecturer in the department of political science at the University of Rhodesia (now University of Zimbabwe).

From 1994 to 1998, Mothobi served as the Zimbabwean ambassador to Japan and South Korea. From 1998 to 2001, Mothobi served as High Commissioner to Kenya and Uganda. While in Kenya, Mothobi also served as a representative to the United Nations Environment Programme. Within Zimbabwe, Mothobi also served as the Permanent Secretary for National Supplies (1985–1987), Permanent Secretary for Labour, Manpower Planning and Social Welfare (1984–1985), Permanent Secretary for Transport (1982–1984), Deputy Secretary for Vocational and Technical Training, Ministry of Manpower Planning and Development (1980–1982), and Director, Research and Planning, Ministry of Manpower Planning and Development (1980).

From 2002 to 2004, Mothobi was chairman of the Zimbabwe Parks and Wildlife Management Authority. Mothobi was also chairman of the Zimre Property Investments board from 2007 to 2016 and chairman of the SFG Insurance board from 2009 to 2012. Mothobi was on the board of the University of Zimbabwe from 2012 to 2015 and later served as its council chairman. Mothobi served on the State Procurement Board from 2006 to 2015, and was executive chairman of the board from November 2015 to December 2017.

Mothobi served as deputy chairman of the Procurement Authority of Zimbabwe in 2018, until his resignation in September 2018 due to poor health.

== Death ==
Mothobi died on 27 February 2019 in Harare, Zimbabwe, aged 79. He died from cancer and was survived by a wife and three children.

President of Zimbabwe Emmerson Mnangagwa mourned the death of Mothobi, praising him for his service to his country.
