= Takunda Mafika =

Takunda Mafika (31 October 1983 – 12 October 2011) was a Zimbabwean musician and teacher living in Harare, Zimbabwe.

== Career as a musician and teacher ==
Takunda Mafika played the Mbira, an African music instrument, famous among the Shona people of Zimbabwe. He taught the mbira to individuals, local schools and colleges and held numerous workshops and performances in Zimbabwe, Germany, Switzerland, Austria, Italy, Poland and Namibia. He also taught to the internet public through the Easy Languages website on YouTube.

With his band he founded, called Tru Bantu, he recorded the album Dzimwe Nguva, that has sold both locally and internationally. He had been working with many well known Zimbabwean artists like Willom Tight, Chiwoniso, Alexio, Mafriq, Sebede, Sam & Selmor Mtukudzi, among others. Takunda Mafika was also the co-founder and manager of the Mbira Society Zimbabwe. Takunda ( nicknamed TK) was a former Junior Governor in the year 2000's Children's Parliament. He had a degree in Music and Musicology earned from the Midlands State University in Zimbabwe. Since 2009 Taku worked as a UNESCO Schools coordinator within the framework of education for sustainable development. In 2010 Taku was invited to join an international music tour organized by the Jesuit Mission Nuremberg, Germany, along with musicians from Europe, Asia, South America and Africa.

== Social activism ==
Through his music and activities Taku often addressed social issues in Zimbabwe as well as subjects of democracy and freedom. He was a known advocate for a peaceful and sustainable development in Zimbabwe. Apart from his commitment as a UNESCO teacher he was the country coordinator for The Global Experience, an international NGO based in Münster, Germany. He was invited on numerous occasions to Germany to participate in conferences and trainings in matters of youth participation, intercultural learning and media competency.

== Death ==
Taku was taken to hospital after suffering from a stroke on 1 October 2011. He initially showed signs of recovering from a brain operation on 7 October, but his condition rapidly declined during the night of 11 October. Taku died during the early hours of 12 October 2011. Taku is survived by a daughter who stays in Chivhu, his home town.
