= Richard Choruma =

Zimbabwean footballer (1978–2020)

Personal information
- Date of birth: 23 November 1978
- Date of death: 29 December 2020 (aged 42)
- Place of death: Thembisa, South Africa
- Height: 1.75 m (5 ft 9 in)
- Position: Winger

Senior career*
Years	Team	Apps	(Gls)
1999–2002	Air Zimbabwe Jets F.C.		
2002–2006	Dynamos F.C.	45	(1)
2003–2004	Highlanders F.C.	31	(2)
2004–2006	Bloemfontein Celtic F.C.	9	(0)
2006	Air Zimbabwe Jets F.C.		
2007–2011	Highlanders F.C.		

International career
2001–2004	Zimbabwe	8	(0)
- * Club domestic league appearances and goals

Richard Choruma (23 November 1978 – 29 December 2020) was a Zimbabwean football winger.

Choruma died on 29 December 2020 from kidney failure.
