= Hunger in Zimbabwe =

Hunger in Zimbabwe was first recorded by the United Nations in 2004. It has, however, a longer history that dates back to early 2000. Since the country's independence, Zimbabwe has experienced a variety of obstacles that have contributed to the country's extreme famine issue. These obstacles include but are not limited to: inflation, dependency ratios, high unemployment rates, and SAP failures. In addition to this, the Zimbabwean government, NGOs within Zimbabwe and international actors have numerous different strategies they want to implement within the nation in order to increase economic growth. However, these conflicts add little to no change within the nation.

== The beginning of urbanization ==
=== Colonial period ===
Before independence, urbanization was slow and poverty within urban areas was infrequent. Laws imposed by colonial powers were implemented in order to keep unemployed Zimbabweans out of urban areas which resulted in less food insecurity amongst these areas. However, this changed in the 1970s during Zimbabwe's liberation period. Rural areas within Zimbabwe were extremely dangerous during the fight for liberation, this resulted in refugees from these areas migrating to urban ones such as Harare, the capital of Zimbabwe. With the arrival of new citizens, jobs were hard to acquire and there was an insufficient amount being made. This ultimately resulted in the rise of poverty rates within urban areas.

During the last years of the Rhodesian Bush War the white minority government restricted the supply of food in rural districts in an attempt to deny food to nationalist forces in what was designated Operation Turkey. This exasperated food shortages that had resulted from a policy forcing much of the rural population into protected villages, an anthrax outbreak, a drought and the breakdown in government services as a result of the war. In late 1979 the International Red Cross estimated that between 13 and 29 percent of Rhodesians were malnourished.

=== Independence and postindependence ===
In 1980, Zimbabwe obtained liberation but their economic situation continued to suffer. Restrictive laws implemented by former powers were removed and this allowed all Zimbabwean citizens to move into urban areas.

The government sustained independence by improving expenditures on healthcare, education and infrastructure. However, other economic issues such as income distribution remained a problem within Zimbabwe and in an attempt to fix their economic failure, these redistribution policies were prioritized and the idea of growing the economy was stunted. This resulted in 50% of GDP consisting of government expenditures by 1990 and a sharp increased of unemployment that skyrocketed from 8% in 1980 to 26% in 1990. This made it difficult for citizens to purchase their basic needs.

== Environmental issues ==
=== Agriculture and drought ===
Zimbabwe has experienced its fair share of agricultural and trade issues. Drought is a huge contributing factor to Zimbabwe's national famine and it occurs often, it results in the decrease of food-stocks & cash flow coming into the country. This shed light on the nation's dependency problems and essentially forced the nation to adopt government SAPs from the World Bank and International Monetary Fund in 1991.

=== Water cuts and shortages ===
1.7 million people, 408,000 of those being women and 935,000 of those being children, lack the access to safe and clean water. Within rural areas, only 50% of water pumps are functional.

== Structural adjustment programs ==
These structural adjustment programs were implemented in order to promote economic growth, mediate their debt and facilitate trade, liberalization, domestic deregulation/investment promotion and reduce government expenditures. However, little progress was made and analysts actually suggest this was Zimbabwe's downfall. The measures implemented resulted in the closure of numerous factories, unemployment and increased consumer prices. This decreased the standard of living within urban areas because of "their dependence on the cash economy."

== Economic meltdown ==
Zimbabwe has experienced a severe economic decline since 2000. During 2003, the largest poverty rate was recorded in urban areas, with a massive 65% increased since 1995 and a 45% increase in rural areas. With poverty rates being at the highest it as ever been, in 2008, life expectancy within the nation reached an all time low of 37 years old, as opposed to age 61 at independence in 1990.

=== Fast track land redistribution ===
In 2000, a program was implemented by the regime in order to redistribute land to indigenous black farmers. With this program, white farmers were stripped of their land and 1.2 million black farmers benefitted. However, at the end of 2002 productivity took a turn for the worse. Production levels were extremely low because the new farmers lacked financial resources, equipment and practice. Production levels increased in 2004 but they did not make up for the loss had a few years earlier. Ultimately, this resulted in the dependency Zimbabwe has on food imports and urban areas suffered the most because of reliance on food imports. Unfortunately, importation is slow due to the lack of foreign currency Zimbabwe acquires.

=== Operation Murambatsvina ===
In 2005, the Zimbabwe regime imposed Operation Murambatsvina. This operation essentially shutdown all smaller, unofficial businesses such as flea markets, backyard houses, vending stalls and other "informal businesses." The government stated they had done this in order to eliminate "illegal" activity.

==== Impacts ====
This operation imposed by the government resulted in several unfortunate outcomes. Former works lost their homes, jobs income and livelihood. In addition to this, many people also lost great sources of basic needs.

==== Criticism ====
Despite what the government had stated about shutting down these businesses, critics speculate the government implemented this operation because it "provided a breeding ground for revolution against the government." After this, civil society struggled to remain visible and present.

== Hyperinflation ==
Zimbabwe's path toward hyperinflation began at the beginning of its independence in the 1970s. In 2000, inflation within Zimbabwe hit its peak at the time, being at 230 percent. In 2019, Zimbabwe has an inflation rate of about 300% which is the world's highest. Recently, inflation has exceptionally high some citizens refer to the currency as valueless and actually turn down money from the WFP, longing for food instead.

== Government and conflict ==
In May 2004, the government ordered 3 UN "crop assessment teams" to halt their services within rural areas. Robert Mugabe, former President of Zimbabwe, reiterated, in his General Assembly Speech, that "Zimbabwe would be self sufficient in food this year." However, most Zimbabweans and other observers do not trust these claims. The Food & Agriculture Organization believed the opposite of Mugabe's claims and suggested that Zimbabwe would most likely face an "overall food deficit of 1 million tons." James Morris, the head of the World Food Programme (WFP), stated he was "personally overwhelmed," about the hunger crisis when visiting Zimbabwe in June, 2004. Lastly, the Opposition Movement for Democratic Change is convinced the government plans to use food as a political tool in order to sway voters.

With an evident pattern, in November, 2008, Morgan Tsvangirai, the leader of Zimbabwe's Movement of Democratic Change, stated that "a million Zimbabweans could starve to death in a year." It is also stated that the government placed the country in a "state induced famine," in order to exploit and control citizens for voting purposes.

== Future accommodations ==
As of 2019, Zimbabwe citizens fear returning to the inflation problem they experienced last decade. In addition to the government offering affordable, subsidized meals to the community, the government has made promises to distribute monthly rations and spend 180 million Zimbabwe dollars a month on subsidies in order to keep foods such as maize meal at a stable price by January 2020.

== Outcomes ==
The UNICEF stated there has been a "widespread of chronic malnutrition" and about 600,000 children need "therapeutic feeding," as of 2004. Citizens have also resorted to dangerous techniques of survival such as, poaching, prostitution and theft.

As of 2019, according to Hilal Elver an independent UN human rights expert, 60% of the nation's population is "food insecure, living in a household that is unable to obtain enough food to meet basic needs."
