= Boniface Chidyausiku =

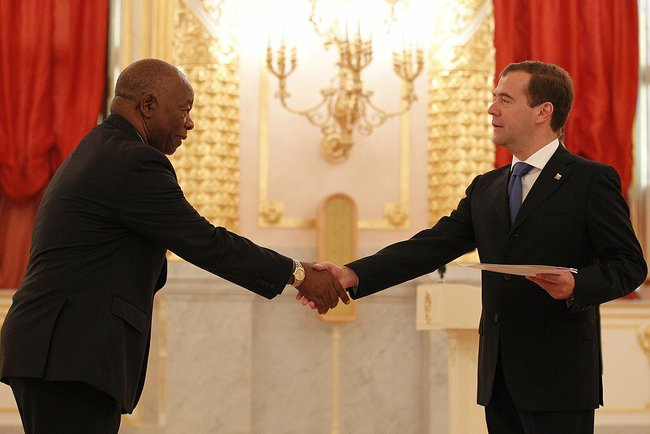
Chidyausiku presents his letters of credence to Russian president Dmitry Medvedev on 14 July 2011.

Boniface Guwa Chidyausiku (born 1950 in Goromonzi District) is a Zimbabwean diplomat who served as Zimbabwe's ambassador to Russia from 2011 to 2015. Chidyausiku participated in the Zimbabwe Liberation War as a member of ZANLA from 1975 to 1980, which led to the attainment of national independence and multiracial democracy. He was attested and commissioned with the rank of lieutenant colonel in the Zimbabwe National Army. He went back to college in 1982 and obtained a BA in history [honours], and a Master of Science degree in international relations from the University of Zimbabwe.

== Diplomatic and public service career timeline ==
- Ambassador to the Russian Federation (2011–2015) at the Embassy of Zimbabwe, Moscow
- Ambassador and Permanent Representative to the United Nations in New York (2003 to 2010)
- Ambassador and Permanent Representative to the United Nations and World Trade Organization (1999 to 2002)
- Ambassador to Angola (1996 to July 1999)
- Ambassador to the People's Republic of China and Democratic People's Republic of Korea; High Commissioner to Pakistan (1990 to 1996)
- Deputy secretary in the Ministry of Foreign Affairs (1990)
- Deputy secretary in the Ministry of Defence (1988 to 1990)
- Zimbabwe's Defence Attache in Washington, D.C., with multiple accreditation to Canada (1986 to 1988)

== International diplomatic activities ==
1. 2010 Vice President of UNICEF Executive Board
2. 2009 Chairman of the 3rd NPT Preparatory Committee for the 2010 NPT Review Conference
3. 2003-2005 President of the UNDP's High Level Committee on Technical Cooperation Among Developing Countries [TCDC]
4. 2002 Chairman of the Committee on Regional Trade Agreements in the World Trade Organization, Geneve, Switzerland
5. 2002 Vice President of the 49th Session of the Trade and Development Board of the United Nations Conference on Trade and Development (UNCTAD)
6. 2002 Head of Delegation to UNCTAD Mid Term Review conference in Bangkok, Thailand
7. 2001 Deputy Head of the Zimbabwe Delegation to the 4th WTO Ministerial Conference in Doha, Qatar
8. 2001-2002 Member of the Organization of African Unity [OAU] Panel of Experts on International Trade Matters
9. 2001 Member of the Selection Committee on the Appointment of Members of the Appellate Body of the Dispute Settlement Body of the WTO
10. 2001 Chairman of the Trips Council of the WTO
11. 2001-2002 Coordinator of the African Group in the WTO, Geneve, Switzerland
12. 2001 President of the Commission on Trade in Goods and Services and Commodities, 59th Session of UNCTAD
13. 2000 Head of Zimbabwe Delegation to UNCTAD 10, Bangkok, Thailand
14. 1999 Delegate to the WTO Ministerial Conference in Seattle, US

== Publications ==
1. A Reconciliation Process as a Component of Conflict Resolution in Zimbabwe in Issues Third World Conflict Resolution. Ed by Gordon Lindgren, Peter Wallenstein, and Kjell-ake Mordquist. 1990
2. Effective Participation of Developing Countries in the World Trade Organization [WTO] Process: Published by Third World Network. 2001
3. African Prospects on Par 6 of the Declaration on the TRIPS Agreement and Public Health, 2003
4. Plant Variety Protection and Life Patents on Life Forms 9 Article 27.3b of the TRIPS Agreement: The Review Process and Developments at the National and Regional Level. in Trading in Knowledge Ed by Christphe Bellmaun, Graham Dutfield, and Ricardo Melendez Ortiz, 2003
