= Zimbabwe fuel protests =

2019 protests in Zimbabwe

- Date: 14 January 2019 – 17 January 2019 (3 days)
- Location: Zimbabwe
- Caused by: 130% increase in fuel prices
- Goals: Elimination of the fuel price increase.
- Methods: Civil resistance, demonstrations, protest marches, rioting, picketing

Parties
MDC-T; Zimbabwe Congress of Trade Unions	ZANU-PF-led government

Casualties and losses
Arrests: 600+; Injuries: 172; Deaths: 12	

Protests began in Zimbabwe on 14 January 2019 following a 130% increase in the price of fuel imposed by the government of Emmerson Mnangagwa. Thousands of Zimbabweans protested against the price increase, along with increasing levels of poverty, the poor state of the economy, and declining standards of living. The government responded with a coordinated crackdown that resulted in hundreds of arrests and multiple deaths. The protests stopped after three days; by 17 January, businesses started reopening as the protests ended.

== Background ==
In an effort to improve the financial and fiscal situation of the country following the establishment of the Mnangagwa government in 2017, the government initiated a number of austerity policies in an effort to kick-start the moribund economy. By October 2018, foreign currency shortages led to large scale business closures and shortages of imported commodities, including fuel. This led to persistent fuel shortages, strikes by government workers, and a worsening economic environment.

On 12 January 2019, the government of Emmerson Mnangagwa announced that the Zimbabwe Energy Regulatory Agency would more than double fuel prices as of midnight that night. The price of diesel rose from US$1.38 to US$3.11 per litre (equivalent to $11.77 per US gallon or €2.73 per litre) and that of petrol from $1.43 to $3.31 per litre ($12.53 per US gallon or €2.91 per litre), for an increase of almost 130% overnight, making Zimbabwe's fuel the most expensive in the world at the time. Mnangagwa stated that the price increases were needed to reduce fuel shortages and illegal trading. The Zimbabwe Congress of Trade Unions called for a three-day strike in protest at the price increases.

== Protests ==
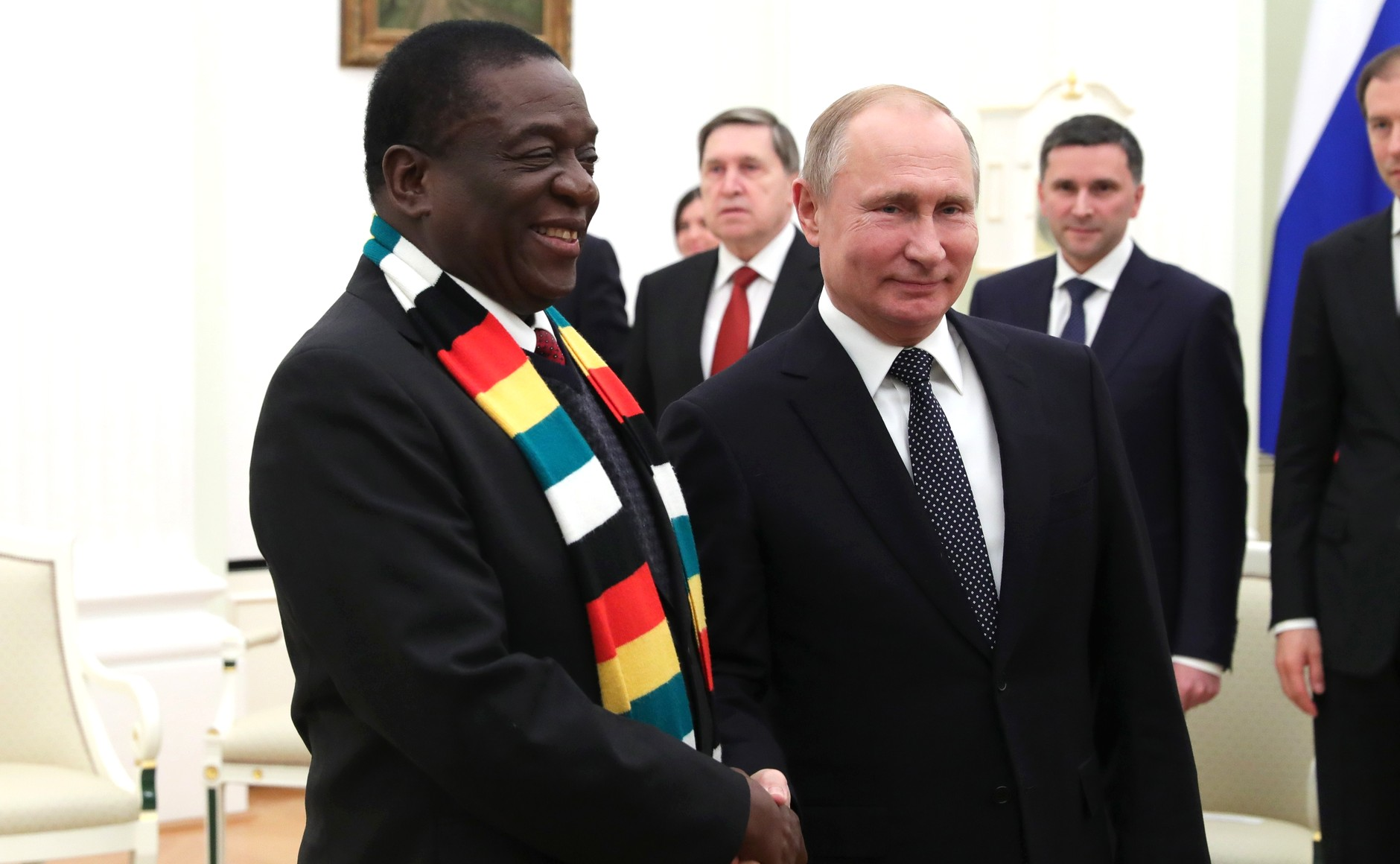
Presidents Vladimir Putin and Emmerson Mnangagwa. President Mnangagwa was in Russia during the protests.

=== During the protests ===
Protests began in Harare on 14 January 2019. In response, the police and military launched a coordinated response that involved raiding the homes of some residents. Beyond the capital, disturbances were also reported in the cities of Mutare and Bulawayo. By the end of the day, the government reported that three people, including one policeman, had died in the protests. Non-government sources reported that around 200 people had been arrested and that eight had been killed in the protests by police by the end of the first day of protests.

The Zimbabwe Association of Doctors for Human Rights (ZADHR) stated that 172 people had been injured, of which 68 were treated for gunshot wounds. Indiscriminate acts of violence by the police on both protesters and bystanders were also reported, along with acts of looting by some protesters in Harare, Bulawayo and Kadoma. By 18 January, the ZADHR had recorded 844 human rights violations that included 78 gunshot injuries, 466 arbitrary arrests and detentions, as well as 242 cases of assault and degrading treatment.

On 15 January, internet monitoring group NetBlocks reported the blocking of over a dozen social media and messaging platforms in Zimbabwe including WhatsApp, Facebook, Twitter and Instagram followed by total internet blackouts. The first three days of the disruption cost the Zimbabwe's economy an estimated $17 million as the government extended its disruption to a full shutdown to prevent the use of VPN circumvention tools by demonstrators. The country's largest cellular provider, Econet, confirmed that the government issued a directive blocking all internet access during the protests. After the protests ended the Zimbabwean High Court ruled that the internet shutdown was illegal and ordered it to be restored.

On the third day of the protests, civil society activist and pastor Evan Mawarire was arrested. Mawarire's lawyer stated that the government alleged that his inciting of violent protests on Twitter as the reason for the arrest. The Movement for Democratic Change – Tsvangirai (MDC-T) stated that its party leadership had been detained by security forces during the protests. An unknown number of abductions by security personnel were reported during the crackdown on the protests.

The government blamed the MDC-T for the protests. MDC-T offices were attacked and torched during the protests with the MDC-T alleging that ZANU-PF supporters were responsible. The government stated that government property and property owned by the ruling ZANU-PF party was damaged in the attacks and blamed MDC-T supporters. The government also stated that the protests were coordinated by opposition parties and compared the protests to terrorism. The MDC-T denied government accusations that they were responsible for violence committed by protesters and highlighted acts of violence committed by government forces against protesters and civilians. A large number of the police raids took place in opposition electoral strong holds in urban areas around Harare.

On 17 January in Harare, the fourth and final day of fixtures in round three of the 2018–19 Logan Cup cricket tournament were both called off due to the protests.

=== After the protests ===
By Saturday the 20 January the security services set up a number of roadblocks throughout the country in an effort to arrest protesters and other individuals wanted by the government. A large number of people who disappeared during the government crackdown during the protests remain unaccounted for.

On 21 January, human rights organizations in Zimbabwe claimed that a total of 12 protesters were killed by security forces and many more had been beaten.

== Response ==
=== Regional response ===
The MDC-T called on South Africa to intervene and criticise the government's violent response. Human Rights Watch stated that the use of unlawful lethal force by the government should be investigated and those responsible prosecuted. Zimbabweans in South Africa demonstrated to encourage South Africa to put pressure on the government to release arrested opposition leaders, restore internet access, and respect human rights. Protests by Zimbabweans against the Zimbabwean government response were also reported in Botswana and Namibia.

South Africa's official opposition party, the Democratic Alliance, stated that the situation within Zimbabwe was so severe that the South African government should abandon its Mbeki-era quiet diplomacy policy and intervene. The Economic Freedom Fighters, a South African political party, issued a statement condemning the Zimbabwean government's violent response to the protests. The South African government said it was monitoring the situation in Zimbabwe and stated with confidence that "measures being taken by the Zimbabwean government will resolve the situation."

The South African Federation of Trade Unions condemned both the fuel price increase and the government's use of lethal force against the protesters. The National Union of Namibian Workers stated that they were "saddened and disturbed by the blatant disregard for trade unions and human rights in Zimbabwe" and criticised the silence of the Southern African Development Community (SADC).

Human Rights Watch criticised the SADC and the African Union for remaining silent on the violations of human rights by the Zimbabwean government during the protests.

=== International response ===
- United States embassy in Zimbabwe stated that it was "alarmed by credible reports that security forces are targeting and beating political activists and labor leaders". The embassy also urged the government to restore access to social media and for peaceful protests.
- United Kingdom summoned the Zimbabwean ambassador to express its concern over the unrest and called on Zimbabwe to "ensure its security forces act professionally, proportionately and at all times with respect for human life".
- European Union criticised the disproportionate use of "force by security personnel" and stated that it expected "the Government of Zimbabwe to uphold human rights and the rule of law, as enshrined in the constitution, and ensure due legal process for those detained."
- UN High Commissioner for Human Rights urged the government to "stop the crackdown" and stated its concern over the security forces' "excessive use of force".

== See also ==
- 2017 Zimbabwean coup d'état
- Economy of Zimbabwe
- List of fuel protests
