= Phelekezela Mphoko =

Zimbabwean diplomat (1940–2024)

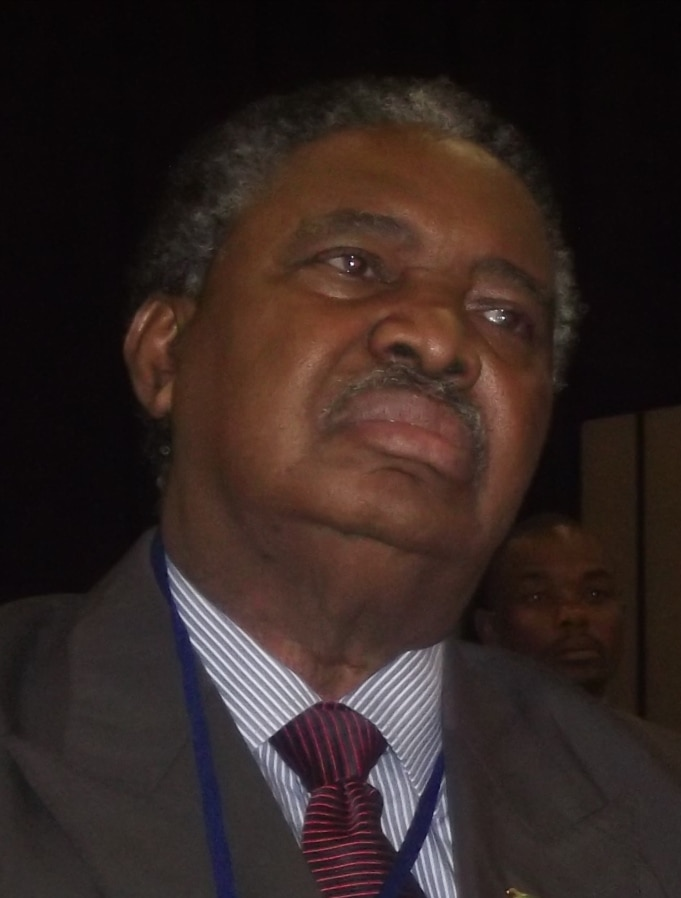
- Mphoko c. 2014

Acting President of Zimbabwe
- In office 21 November 2017 – 24 November 2017
- Preceded by: Robert Mugabe
- Succeeded by: Emmerson Mnangagwa

Second Vice-President of Zimbabwe
- In office 12 December 2014 – 27 November 2017
- President: Robert Mugabe
- Preceded by: John Nkomo
- Succeeded by: Kembo Mohadi

Ambassador of Zimbabwe
- In office 1987–2014

Personal details
- Born: 11 June 1940 Gwizane, Southern Rhodesia (now Zimbabwe)
- Died: 6 December 2024 (aged 84) India
- Party: ZANU–PF (until 2017); Independent (2017–2022); ZANU–PF (2023–2024)
- Spouse: Laurinda Mphoko
- Children: Siqokoqela (son); Sikhumbuzo (daughter); Siduduzo (daughter)
- Parent(s): Mahlwempu Mphoko; Muntu-omubi Mphoko

Phelekezela Mphoko (11 June 1940 – 6 December 2024) was a Zimbabwean politician, diplomat, businessman and military commander who served as Second Vice-President of Zimbabwe from 2014 until 2017, as well as Zimbabwe's ambassador to Russia, Botswana and South Africa. Legally, Mphoko was the acting President of Zimbabwe from 21 to 24 November 2017, however, as he was not in the country at the time, his official standing on this is unclear. Mphoko's term as vice-president was ended by President Emmerson Mnangagwa following the dissolution of the cabinet on 27 November 2017.

== Life and career ==
Cde Mphoko attended David Livingstone Memorial School and Mzilikazi High School, before studying at the Tshototsho Agricultural Breeding and Experimental School. His involvement in political activism began at a young age, leading to his arrest in 1963 for participation in political violence. Subsequently, he received military training in the Soviet Union, where he became an influential figure in the Zimbabwean liberation struggle.

Mphoko served as Zimbabwe's Ambassador to Botswana and Russia before being transferred to Pretoria as Ambassador to South Africa.

On 10 December 2014, President Mugabe finally appointed Mphoko as Vice-President, alongside Emmerson Mnangagwa (who represented the ZANU wing of the party). Mugabe also assigned Mphoko the ministerial portfolio of National Healing, Peace and Reconciliation. He was sworn in as Vice-President on 12 December 2014. On 6 July 2015, Mugabe assigned Mphoko responsibility for coordination and implementation of policy.

=== Death ===
Mphoko died in India on 6 December 2024, at the age of 84. He was the country's oldest surviving former Vice President at the time of his death.
