= History of Zimbabwe =

Until roughly 2,000 years ago, what would become Zimbabwe was populated by ancestors of the San people. Bantu inhabitants of the region arrived and developed ceramic production in the area. A series of trading empires emerged, including the Kingdom of Mapungubwe and Kingdom of Zimbabwe. In the 1880s, the British South Africa Company began its activities in the region, leading to the colonial era in Southern Rhodesia.

In 1965, the colonial government declared itself independent as Rhodesia, but largely failed to secure international recognition and faced sustained internal opposition in the Rhodesian Bush War.

After fifteen years of war, following the Lancaster House Agreement of 1979 there was a transition to internationally recognised majority rule in 1980. The United Kingdom, which had never recognised Rhodesian independence, briefly imposed direct rule in order to grant independence on 18 April that year as the new country of Zimbabwe. In the 2000s Zimbabwe's economy began to deteriorate due to various factors, including the imposition of economic sanctions by Western countries led by the United Kingdom and widespread corruption in government. Economic instability caused many Zimbabweans to emigrate. Prior to its recognized independence as Zimbabwe in 1980, the nation had been known by several names: Rhodesia, Southern Rhodesia, and Zimbabwe Rhodesia.

== Pre-Colonial era (150,000 BCE – 1852 CE) ==
=== Prehistory ===
By 150,000 BC, Homo sapiens had migrated to the region now known as Zimbabwe from East Africa (South of the Zambezi River). Prior to the arrival of Bantu speakers in present-day Zimbabwe the region was populated by ancestors of the San people. The first Bantu-speaking farmers arrived during the Bantu expansion around 2000 years ago.

These Bantu speakers were the makers of early Iron Age pottery belonging to the Silver Leaves or Matola tradition, of the third to fifth centuries A.D., found in southeast Zimbabwe. This tradition was part of the eastern stream of Bantu expansion (sometimes called Kwale) which originated west of the Great Lakes, spreading to the coastal regions of southeastern Kenya and north eastern Tanzania, and then southwards to Mozambique, south eastern Zimbabwe and Natal. More substantial in numbers in Zimbabwe were the makers of the Ziwa and Gokomere ceramic wares, of the fourth century A.D. Their early Iron Age ceramic tradition belonged to the highlands facies of the eastern stream, which moved inland to Malawi and Zimbabwe. Imports of beads have been found at Gokomere and Ziwa sites, possibly in return for gold exported to the coast.

A later phase of the Gokomere culture was the Zhizo in southern Zimbabwe. Zhizo communities settled in the Shashe-Limpopo area in the tenth century. Their capital there was Schroda (just across the Limpopo River from Zimbabwe). Many fragments of ceramic figurines have been recovered from there, including figures of animals and birds, and also fertility dolls. The inhabitants produced ivory bracelets and other ivory goods. Imported beads found there and at other Zhizo sites, are evidence of trade, probably of ivory and skins, with traders on the Indian Ocean coast.

Pottery belonging to a western stream of Bantu expansion (sometimes called Kalundu) has been found at sites in northeastern Zimbabwe, dating back to the seventh century. (The western stream originated in the same area as the eastern stream: both belong to the same style system, called by Phillipson the Chifumbadze system, which has general acceptance by archaeologists.) The terms eastern and western streams represent the expansion of the Bantu-speaking peoples in terms of their culture. Another question is about the branches of the Bantu languages which they spoke. It seems that the makers of the Ziwa/Gokomere wares were not the ancestral speakers of the Shona languages of today's Zimbabwe, who did not arrive in there until around the tenth century, from south of the Limpopo river, and whose ceramic culture belonged to the western stream. The linguist and historian Ehret believes that in view of the similarity of the Ziwa/Gokomere pottery to the Nkope of the ancestral Nyasa language speakers, the Ziwa/Gokomere people spoke a language closely related to the Nyasa group. Their language, whatever it was, was superseded by the ancestral Shona languages, although Ehret says that a set of Nyasa words occur in central Shungalunka dialects today.

The evidence that the ancestral Shona speakers came from South Africa is that the ceramic styles associated with Shona speakers in Zimbabwe from the thirteenth to the seventeenth centuries can be traced back to western stream (Kalunndu) pottery styles in South Africa. The Ziwa /Gokomere and Zhizo traditions were superseded by Leopards Kopje and Gumanye wares of the Kalundu tradition from the tenth century.

Although the western stream Kalundu tradition was ancestral to Shona ceramic wares, the closest relationships of the ancestral Shona language according to many linguists were with a southern division of eastern Bantu – such languages as the southeastern languages (Nguni, Sotho-Tswana, Tsonga), Nyasa and Makwa. While it may well be the case that the people of the western stream spoke a language belonging to a wider Eastern Bantu division, it is a puzzle which remains to be resolved that they spoke a language most closely related to the languages just mentioned, all of which are today spoken in southeastern Africa.

After the Shona speaking people moved into the present day Zimbabwe many different dialects developed over time in the different parts of the country. Among these was Kalanga.

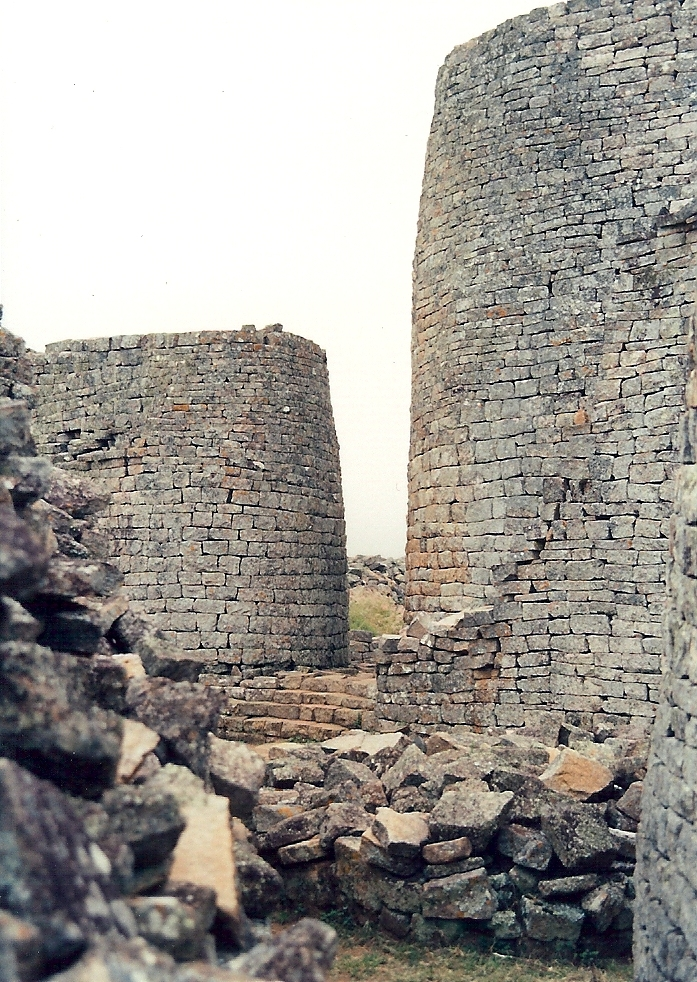
Towers of Great Zimbabwe.

It is believed that Kalanga speaking societies first emerged in the middle Limpopo valley in the early 12th century before moving on to the Zimbabwean highlands. The Zimbabwean plateau eventually became the centre of subsequent Kalanga states. The Kingdom of Mapungubwe was the first in a series of sophisticated trade states developed in Zimbabwe by the time of the first European explorers from Portugal. They traded in gold, ivory and copper for cloth and glass. From about 1250 until 1450, Mapungubwe was eclipsed by the Kingdom of Zimbabwe. This Kalanga state further refined and expanded upon Mapungubwe's stone architecture, which survives to this day at the ruins of the kingdom's capital of Great Zimbabwe. From c. 1450–1760, Zimbabwe gave way to the Kingdom of Mutapa. This Kalanga state ruled much of the area that is known as Zimbabwe today, and parts of central Mozambique. It is known by many names including the Mutapa Empire, also known as Mwenemutapa was known for its gold trade routes with Arabs and the Portuguese. António Fernandes, a Portuguese explorer, first entered the area in 1511 from Sofala and encountered the Manyika people. He returned in 1513 and explored the northern region of the territory, coming into contact with Chikuyo Chisamarengu, the ruler of Mutapa. In the early 17th century, Portuguese settlers destroyed the trade and began a series of wars which left the empire in near collapse. As a direct response to Portuguese aggression in the interior, a new Kalanga state emerged called the Rozvi Empire. Relying on centuries of military, political and religious development, the Rozvi (which means "destroyers") removed the Portuguese from the Zimbabwe plateau by force of arms. The Rozvi continued the stone building traditions of the Zimbabwe and Mapungubwe kingdoms while adding guns to its arsenal and developing a professional army to protect its trade routes and conquests. Around 1821, the Zulu general Mzilikazi of the Khumalo clan successfully rebelled from King Shaka and created his own clan, the Ndebele. The Ndebele fought their way northwards into the Transvaal, leaving a trail of destruction in their wake and beginning an era of widespread devastation known as the Mfecane. When Boer trekkers converged on the Transvaal in 1836, they drove the tribe even further northward.

After losing their remaining South African lands in 1840, Mzilikazi and his tribe permanently settled the southwest of present-day Zimbabwe in what became known as Matabeleland, establishing Bulawayo as their capital. Mzilikazi then organised his society into a military system with regimental kraals, similar to those of Shaka, which was stable enough to repel further Boer incursions. During the pre-colonial period, the Ndebele social structure was stratified. It was composed mainly of three social groups, abeZansi, Enhla and Amahole. The Zansi were the ruling class of the original Khumalo people who migrated from south of Limpopo with Mzilikazi. The Enhla and Amahole groups were made up of other tribes and ethnics who had been incorporated into the empire during the migration. However, with the passage of time, this stratification has slowly disappeared The Ndebele people have for long ascribed to the worship of Unkunkulu as their supreme being. Their religious life in general, rituals, ceremonies, practices, devotion and loyalty revolves around the worship of this Supreme Being. However, with the popularisation of Christianity and other religions, Ndebele traditional religion is now uncommon.

Mzilikazi died in 1868 and, following a violent power struggle, was succeeded by his son, Lobengula. King Mzilikazi had established the Ndebele Kingdom, with Shona subjects paying tribute to him. The nascent kingdom encountered European powers for the first time and Lobengula signed various treaties with the various nations jostling for power in the region, playing them off one another in order to preserve the sovereignty of his kingdom and gain the aid of the Europeans should the kingdom become involved in a war.

== Colonial era (1890–1980) ==
In the 1880s, British diamond magnate Cecil Rhodes' British South Africa Company (BSAC) started to make inroads into the region. In 1898, the name Southern Rhodesia was adopted. In 1888, Rhodes obtained a concession for mining rights from King Lobengula of the Ndebele peoples. Cecil Rhodes presented this concession to persuade the British government to grant a royal charter to his British South Africa Company over Matabeleland, and its subject states such as Mashonaland. Rhodes sought permission to negotiate similar concessions covering all territory between the Limpopo River and Lake Tanganyika, then known as 'Zambesia'. In accordance with the terms of aforementioned concessions and treaties, Cecil Rhodes promoted the immigration of white settlers into the region, as well as the establishment of mines, primarily to extract the diamond ores present. In 1895 the BSAC adopted the name 'Rhodesia' for the territory of Zambesia, in honour of Cecil Rhodes. In 1898, 'Southern Rhodesia' became the official denotation for the region south of the Zambezi, which later became Zimbabwe. The region to the north was administered separately by the BSAC and later named Northern Rhodesia (now Zambia).

The Shona waged unsuccessful wars (known as Chimurenga) against encroachment upon their lands by clients of BSAC and Cecil Rhodes in 1896 and 1897. Following the failed insurrections of 1896–97 the Ndebele and Shona groups became subject to Rhodes's administration thus precipitating European settlement en masse in the new colony.

The colony's first formal constitution was drafted in 1899, and copied various pieces of legislation directly from that of the Union of South Africa; Rhodesia was meant to be, in many ways, a shadow colony of the Cape. Many within the administrative framework of the BSAC assumed that Southern Rhodesia, when its "development" was "suitably advanced", would "take its rightful place as a member of" the Union of South Africa after the Second Boer War (1898–1902), when the four South African colonies joined under the auspices of one flag and began to work towards the creation of a unified administrative structure. The territory was made open to white settlement, and these settlers were then in turn given considerable administrative powers, including a franchise that, while on the surface non-racial, ensured "a predominantly European electorate" which "operated to preclude Great Britain from modifying her policy in Southern Rhodesia and subsequently treating it as a territory inhabited mainly by Africans whose interests should be paramount and to whom British power should be transferred".

=== World War I ===
As a British territory, Southern Rhodesia immediately joined World War I after the UK declared war on the Central Powers, in August 1914. Rhodesia was noted for its patriotic zeal in joining the war. The main priority of British forces in Southern Africa was the capture of the German colony of South-West Africa, modern-day Namibia. A Rhodesian unit was sent to guard Victoria Falls from a possible German invasion via the Caprivi Strip. Meanwhile, a force was sent to assist British forces in South Africa suppressing the pro-German Maritz Rebellion. Afterwards, Rhodesians participated in the invasion of German South-West Africa.

Following the British victory over German forces in Southern Africa, many Rhodesian units, mostly white, were sent to the Western Front in Europe, where they took part in major battles of the war. A small number of Rhodesian soldiers saw action in the Salonika Front in Macedonia, and some even joined the Royal Flying Corps. Other Rhodesian regiments were sent to participate in the invasion of German East Africa, now Tanzania, in early 1915. A guerrilla war in the German colony began, and the fierce fighting and disease devastated the 2nd Rhodesian Regiment, leading to more regiments of native Africans being raised. By November 1918, the Central Powers surrendered to the Allies, ending World War I.

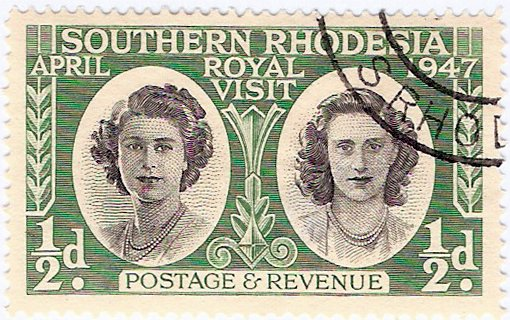
Southern Rhodesia stamp: princesses Elizabeth and Margaret on the 1947 royal tour of South Africa

Southern Rhodesia became a self-governing British colony in October 1923, subsequent to a referendum held the previous year. The British government took full command of the British South Africa Company's holdings, including both Northern and Southern Rhodesia. Northern Rhodesia retained its status as a colonial protectorate; Southern Rhodesia was given responsible self-government – with limitations and still annexed to the crown as a colony. Many studies of the country see it as a state that operated independently within the Commonwealth; nominally under the rule of the Crown, but technically able to do as it pleased. And in theory, Southern Rhodesia was able to govern itself, draft its own legislation, and elect its own parliamentary leaders. But in reality, this was self-government subject to supervision. Until the white minority settler government's declaration of unilateral independence in 1965, London remained in control of the colony's external affairs, and all legislation was subject to approval from the United Kingdom Government and the Queen.

In 1930, the Land Apportionment Act divided rural land along racial lines, creating four types of land: white-owned land that could not be acquired by Africans; purchase areas for those Africans who could afford to purchase land; Tribal Trust Lands designated as the African reserves; and Crown lands owned by the state, reserved for future use and public parks. Fifty one percent of the land was given to approximately 50,000 white inhabitants, with 29.8 percent left for over a million Africans.

Many Rhodesians served on behalf of the United Kingdom during World War II, mainly in the East African Campaign against Axis forces in Italian East Africa.

In 1953, the British government consolidated the two colonies of Rhodesia with Nyasaland (now Malawi) in the ill-fated Federation of Rhodesia and Nyasaland which was dominated by Southern Rhodesia. This move was heavily opposed by the residents of Nyasaland, who feared coming under the domination of white Rhodesians. In 1962, however, with growing African nationalism and general dissent, the British government declared that Nyasaland had the right to secede from the Federation; soon afterwards, they said the same for Northern Rhodesia.

After African-majority governments had assumed control in neighbouring Northern Rhodesia and in Nyasaland, the white-minority Southern Rhodesian government led by Ian Smith made a Unilateral Declaration of Independence (UDI) from the United Kingdom on 11 November 1965. The United Kingdom deemed this an act of rebellion, but did not re-establish control by force. The white minority government declared itself a republic in 1970. A civil war ensued, with Joshua Nkomo's ZAPU and Robert Mugabe's ZANU using assistance from the governments of Zambia and Mozambique. Although Smith's declaration was not recognised by the United Kingdom nor any other foreign power, Southern Rhodesia dropped the designation "Southern", and claimed nation status as the Republic of Rhodesia in 1970 although this was not recognised internationally.

== Independence and the 1980s ==
The country gained official independence as Zimbabwe on 18 April 1980. The government held independence celebrations in Rufaro stadium in Salisbury, the capital. Lord Christopher Soames, the last Governor of Southern Rhodesia, watched as Charles, Prince of Wales, gave a farewell salute and the Rhodesian Signal Corps played "God Save the Queen". Many foreign dignitaries also attended, including Prime Minister Indira Gandhi of India, President Shehu Shagari of Nigeria, President Kenneth Kaunda of Zambia, President Seretse Khama of Botswana, and Prime Minister Malcolm Fraser of Australia, representing the Commonwealth of Nations. Bob Marley sang 'Zimbabwe', a song he wrote, at the government's invitation in a concert at the country's independence festivities.

President Shagari pledged $15 million at the celebration to train Zimbabweans in Zimbabwe and expatriates in Nigeria. Mugabe's government used part of the money to buy newspaper companies owned by South Africans, increasing the government's control over the media. The rest went to training students in Nigerian universities, government workers in the Administrative Staff College of Nigeria in Badagry, and soldiers in the Nigerian Defence Academy in Kaduna. Later that year Mugabe commissioned a report by the BBC on press freedom in Zimbabwe. The BBC issued its report on 26 June, recommending the privatisation of the Zimbabwe Broadcasting Corporation and its independence from political interests.

Mugabe's government changed the capital's name from Salisbury to Harare on 18 April 1982 in celebration of the second anniversary of independence. The government renamed the main street in the capital, Jameson Avenue, in honour of Samora Machel, President of Mozambique.

In 1992, a World Bank study indicated that more than 500 health centres had been built since 1980. The percentage of children vaccinated increased from 25% in 1980 to 67% in 1988 and life expectancy increased from 55 to 59 years. Enrollment increased by 232 per cent one year after primary education was made free and secondary school enrolment increased by 33 per cent in two years. These social policies lead to an increase in the debt ratio. Several laws were passed in the 1980s in an attempt to reduce wage gaps. However, the gaps remained considerable. In 1988, the law gave women, at least in theory, the same rights as men. Previously, they could only take a few personal initiatives without the consent of their father or husband.

The new Constitution provided for an executive President as Head of State with a Prime Minister as Head of Government. Reverend Canaan Banana served as the first President. In government amended the Constitution in 1987 to provide for an Executive President and abolished the office of Prime Minister. The constitutional changes came into effect on 1 January 1988 with Robert Mugabe as president. The bicameral Parliament of Zimbabwe had a directly elected House of Assembly and an indirectly elected Senate, partly made up of tribal chiefs. The Constitution established two separate voters rolls, one for the black majority, who had 80% of the seats in Parliament, and the other for whites and other ethnic minorities, such as Coloureds, people of mixed race, and Asians, who held 20%. The government amended the Constitution in 1986, eliminating the voter rolls and replacing the white seats with seats filled by nominated members. Many white MPs joined ZANU which then reappointed them. In 1990 the government abolished the Senate and increased the House of Assembly's membership to include members nominated by the President.

Prime Minister Mugabe kept Peter Walls, the head of the army, in his government and put him in charge of integrating the Zimbabwe People's Revolutionary Army (ZIPRA), Zimbabwe African National Liberation Army (ZANLA), and the Rhodesian Army. While Western media outlets praised Mugabe's efforts at reconciliation with the white minority, tension soon developed. On 17 March 1980, after several unsuccessful assassination attempts Mugabe asked Walls, "Why are your men trying to kill me?" Walls replied, "If they were my men you would be dead." BBC News interviewed Walls on 11 August 1980. He told the BBC that he had asked British Prime Minister Margaret Thatcher to annul the 1980 election prior to the official announcement of the result on the grounds that Mugabe used intimidation to win the election. Walls said Thatcher had not replied to his request. On 12 August British government officials denied that they had not responded, saying Antony Duff, Deputy Governor of Salisbury, told Walls on 3 March that Thatcher would not annul the election.

Minister of Information Nathan Shamuyarira said the government would not be "held ransom by racial misfits" and told "all those Europeans who do not accept the new order to pack their bags." He also said the government continued to consider taking "legal or administrative action" against Walls. Mugabe, returning from a visit with United States President Jimmy Carter in New York City, said, "One thing is quite clear—we are not going to have disloyal characters in our society." Walls returned to Zimbabwe after the interview, telling Peter Hawthorne of Time magazine, "To stay away at this time would have appeared like an admission of guilt." Mugabe drafted legislation that would exile Walls from Zimbabwe for life and Walls moved to South Africa.

Ethnic divisions soon came back to the forefront of national politics. Tension between ZAPU and ZANU erupted with guerrilla activity starting again in Matabeleland in south-western Zimbabwe. Nkomo (ZAPU) left for exile in Britain and did not return until Mugabe guaranteed his safety. In 1982 government security officials discovered large caches of arms and ammunition on properties owned by ZAPU, accusing Nkomo and his followers of plotting to overthrow the government. Mugabe fired Nkomo and his closest aides from the cabinet. Seven MPs, members of the Rhodesian Front, left Smith's party to sit as "independents" on 4 March 1982, signifying their dissatisfaction with his policies. As a result of what they saw as persecution of Nkomo and his party, PF-ZAPU supporters, army deserters began a campaign of dissidence against the government. Centring primarily in Matabeleland, home of the Ndebeles who were at the time PF-ZAPU's main followers, this dissidence continued through 1987. It involved attacks on government personnel and installations, armed banditry aimed at disrupting security and economic life in the rural areas, and harassment of ZANU-PF members.

Because of the unsettled security situation immediately after independence and democratic sentiments, the government kept in force a "state of emergency". This gave the government widespread powers under the "Law and Order Maintenance Act," including the right to detain persons without charge which it used quite widely. In 1983 to 1984 the government declared a curfew in areas of Matabeleland and sent in the army in an attempt to suppress members of the Ndebele tribe. The pacification campaign, known as the Gukuruhundi, or strong wind, resulted in at least 20,000 civilian deaths perpetrated by an elite, North Korean-trained brigade, known in Zimbabwe as the Gukurahundi.

ZANU-PF increased its majority in the 1985 elections, winning 67 of the 100 seats. The majority gave Mugabe the opportunity to start making changes to the constitution, including those with regard to land restoration. Fighting did not cease until Mugabe and Nkomo reached an agreement in December 1987 whereby ZAPU became part of ZANU-PF and the government changed the constitution to make Mugabe the country's first executive president and Nkomo one of two vice-presidents.

== 1990s ==
Elections in March 1990 resulted in another overwhelming victory for Mugabe and his party, which won 117 of the 120 election seats. Election observers estimated voter turnout at only 54% and found the campaign neither free nor fair, though balloting met international standards. Unsatisfied with a de facto one-party state, Mugabe called on the ZANU-PF Central Committee to support the creation of a de jure one-party state in September 1990 and lost. The government began further amending the constitution. The judiciary and human rights advocates fiercely criticised the first amendments enacted in April 1991 because they restored corporal and capital punishment and denied recourse to the courts in cases of compulsory purchase of land by the government. The general health of the civilian population also began to significantly flounder and by 1997 25% of the population of Zimbabwe had been infected by HIV, the AIDS virus.

During the 1990s students, trade unionists, and workers often demonstrated to express their discontent with the government. Students protested in 1990 against proposals for an increase in government control of universities and again in 1991 and 1992 when they clashed with police. Trade unionists and workers also criticised the government during this time. In 1992 police prevented trade unionists from holding anti-government demonstrations. In 1994 widespread industrial unrest weakened the economy. In 1996 civil servants, nurses, and junior doctors went on strike over salary issues.

On 9 December 1997 a national strike paralysed the country. Mugabe was panicked by demonstrations by ZANLA ex-combatants, war veterans, who had been the heart of incursions 20 years earlier in the Bush War. He agreed to pay them large gratuities and pensions, which proved to be a wholly unproductive and unbudgeted financial commitment. The discontent with the government spawned draconian government crackdowns which in turn started to destroy both the fabric of the state and of society. This in turn brought with it further discontent within the population. Thus a vicious downward spiral commenced.

Although many whites had left Zimbabwe after independence, mainly for neighbouring South Africa, those who remained continued to wield disproportionate control of some sectors of the economy, especially agriculture. In the late-1990s whites accounted for less than 1% of the population but owned 70% of arable land. Mugabe raised this issue of land ownership by white farmers. In a calculated move, he began forcible land redistribution, which brought the government into headlong conflict with the International Monetary Fund. Amid a severe drought in the region, the police and military were instructed not to stop the invasion of white-owned farms by the so-called 'war veterans' and youth militia. This led to a mass migration of White Zimbabweans out of Zimbabwe. At present almost no arable land is in the possession of white farmers.

=== The economy during the 1980s and 1990s ===
The economy was run along corporatist lines with strict governmental controls on all aspects of the economy. Controls were placed on wages, prices and massive increases in government spending resulting in significant budget deficits. This experiment met with very mixed results and Zimbabwe fell further behind the first world and unemployment. Some market reforms in the 1990s were attempted. A 40 per cent devaluation of the Zimbabwean dollar was allowed to occur and price and wage controls were removed. These policies also failed at that time. Growth, employment, wages, and social service spending contracted sharply, inflation did not improve, the deficit remained well above target, and many industrial firms, notably in textiles and footwear, closed in response to increased competition and high real interest rates. The incidence of poverty in the country increased during this time.

== 1999 to 2000 ==
However, Zimbabwe began experiencing a period of considerable political and economic upheaval in 1999. Opposition to President Mugabe and the ZANU-PF government grew considerably after the mid-1990s in part due to worsening economic and human rights conditions brought about by the seizure of farmland owned by white farmers and economic sanctions imposed by Western countries in response. The Movement for Democratic Change (MDC) was established in September 1999 as an opposition party founded by trade unionist Morgan Tsvangirai.

The MDC's first opportunity to test opposition to the Mugabe government came in February 2000, when a referendum was held on a draft constitution proposed by the government. Among its elements, the new constitution would have permitted President Mugabe to seek two additional terms in office, granted government officials immunity from prosecution, and authorised government seizure of white-owned land. The referendum was handily defeated. Shortly thereafter, the government, through a loosely organised group of war veterans, some of the so-called war veterans judging from their age were not war veterans as they were too young to have fought in the chimurenga, sanctioned an aggressive land redistribution program often characterised by forced expulsion of white farmers and violence against both farmers and farm employees.

Parliamentary elections held in June 2000 were marred by localised violence, electoral irregularities, and government intimidation of opposition supporters. Nonetheless, the MDC succeeded in capturing 57 of 120 seats in the National Assembly.

== 2002 ==
Presidential elections were held in March 2002. In the months leading up to the poll, ZANU-PF, with the support of the army, security services, and especially the so-called 'war veterans', – very few of whom actually fought in the Second Chimurenga against the Smith regime in the 1970s – set about wholesale intimidation and suppression of the MDC-led opposition. Despite strong international criticism, these measures, together with organised subversion of the electoral process, ensured a Mugabe victory . The government's behaviour drew strong criticism from the EU and the US, which imposed limited sanctions against the leading members of the Mugabe regime. Since the 2002 election, Zimbabwe has suffered further economic difficulty and growing political chaos.

== 2003–2005 ==
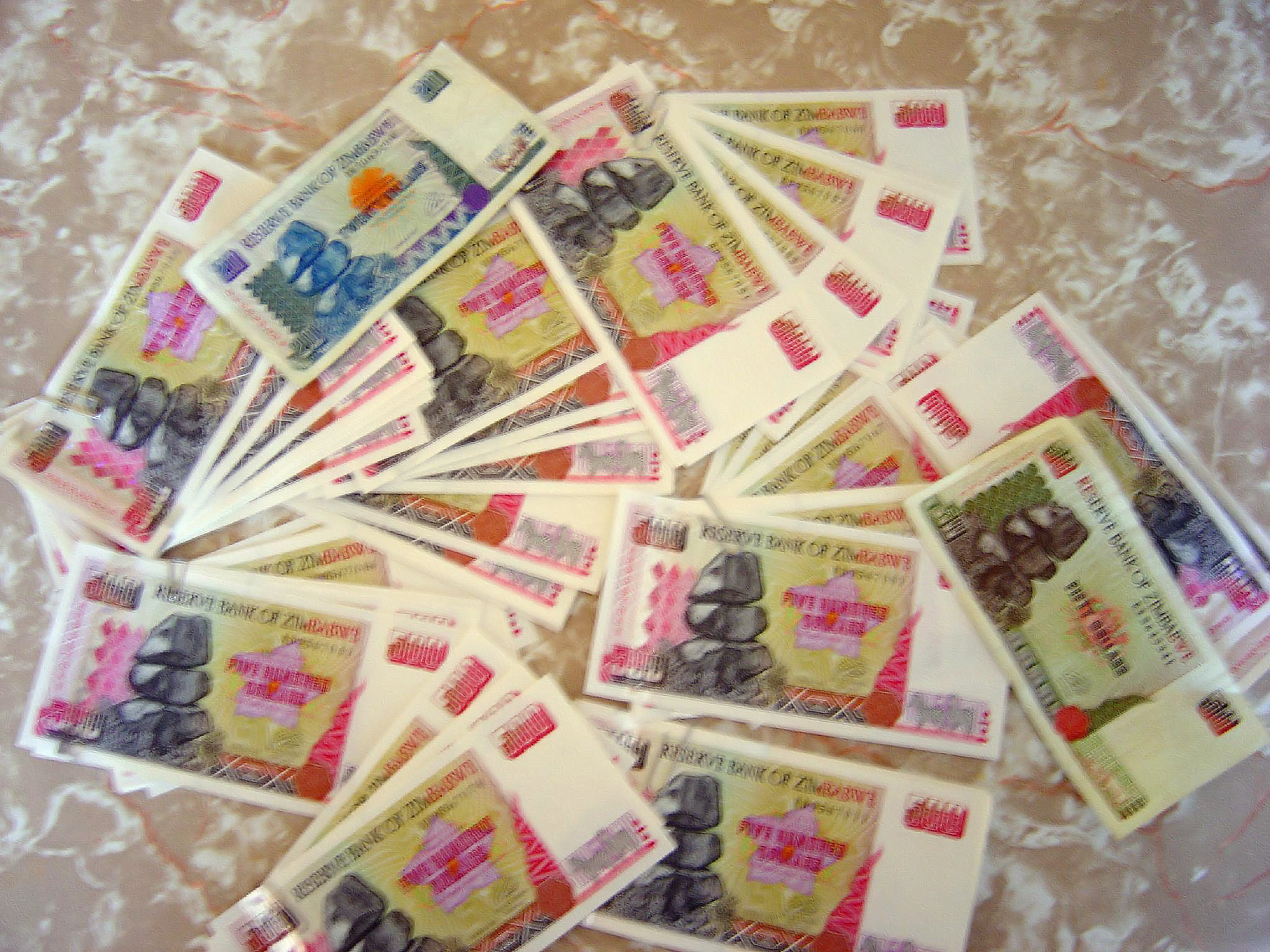
GBP 8 worth of Zimbabwean dollars in 2003

Divisions within the opposition MDC had begun to fester early in the decade, after Morgan Tsvangirai (the president of the MDC) was lured into a government sting operation that videotaped him talking of Mr. Mugabe's removal from power. He was subsequently arrested and put on trial on treason charges. This crippled his control of party affairs and raised questions about his competence. It also catalysed a major split within the party. In 2004 he was acquitted, but not until after suffering serious abuse and mistreatment in prison. The opposing faction was led by Welshman Ncube who was the general secretary of the party. In mid-2004, vigilantes loyal to Mr. Tsvangirai began attacking members who were mostly loyal to Ncube, climaxing in a September raid on the party's Harare headquarters in which the security director was nearly thrown to his death.

An internal party inquiry later established that aides to Tsvangirai had tolerated, if not endorsed, the violence. Divisive as the violence was, it was a debate over the rule of law that set off the party's final break-up in November 2005. These division severely weakened the opposition. In addition the government employed its own operatives to both spy on each side and to undermine each side via acts of espionage. Zimbabwean parliamentary election, 2005 were held in March 2005 in which ZANU-PF won a two-thirds majority, were again criticised by international observers as being flawed. Mugabe's political operatives were thus able to weaken the opposition internally and the security apparatus of the state was able to destabilise it externally by using violence in anti-Mugabe strongholds to prevent citizens from voting. Some voters were 'turned away' from polling station despite having proper identification, further guaranteeing that the government could control the results. Additionally Mugabe had started to appoint judges sympathetic to the government, making any judicial appeal futile. Mugabe was also able to appoint 30 of the members of parliament.

As Senate elections approached further opposition splits occurred. Ncube's supporters argued that the M.D.C. should field a slate of candidates; Tsvangirai's argued for a boycott. When party leaders voted on the issue, Ncube's side narrowly won, but Mr. Tsvangirai declared that as president of the party he was not bound by the majority's decision. Again the opposition was weakened. As a result, the elections for a new Senate in November 2005 were largely boycotted by the opposition. Mugabe's party won 24 of the 31 constituencies where elections were held amid low voter turnout. Again, evidence surfaced of voter intimidation and fraud.

In May 2005 the government began Operation Murambatsvina. It was officially billed to rid urban areas of illegal structures, illegal business enterprises, and criminal activities. In practice its purpose was to punish political opponents. The UN estimates 700,000 people have been left without jobs or homes as a result. Families and traders, especially at the beginning of the operation, were often given no notice before police destroyed their homes and businesses. Others were able to salvage some possessions and building materials but often had nowhere to go, despite the government's statement that people should be returning to their rural homes. Thousands of families were left unprotected in the open in the middle of Zimbabwe's winter., . The government interfered with non-governmental organisation (NGO) efforts to provide emergency assistance to the displaced in many instances. Some families were removed to transit camps, where they had no shelter or cooking facilities and minimal food, supplies, and sanitary facilities. The operation continued into July 2005, when the government began a program to provide housing for the newly displaced.

Human Rights Watch said the evictions had disrupted treatment for people with HIV/AIDS in a country where 3,000 die from the disease each week and about 1.3 million children have been orphaned. The operation was "the latest manifestation of a massive human rights problem that has been going on for years", said Amnesty International. As of September 2006, housing construction fell far short of demand, and there were reports that beneficiaries were mostly civil servants and ruling party loyalists, not those displaced. The government campaign of forced evictions continued in 2006, albeit on a lesser scale.

In September 2005 Mugabe signed constitutional amendments that reinstituted a national senate (abolished in 1987) and that nationalised all land. This converted all ownership rights into leases. The amendments also ended the right of landowners to challenge government expropriation of land in the courts and marked the end of any hope of returning any land that had been hitherto grabbed by armed land invasions. Elections for the senate in November resulted in a victory for the government. The MDC split over whether to field candidates and partially boycotted the vote. In addition to low turnout there was widespread government intimidation. The split in the MDC hardened into factions, each of which claimed control of the party. The early months of 2006 were marked by food shortages and mass hunger. The sheer extremity of the siltation was revealed by the fact that in the courts, state witnesses said they were too weak from hunger to testify.

== 2006 to 2007 ==
In August 2006 runaway inflation forced the government to replace its existing currency with a revalued one. In December 2006, ZANU-PF proposed the "harmonisation" of the parliamentary and presidential election schedules in 2010; the move was seen by the opposition as an excuse to extend Mugabe's term as president until 2010.

Morgan Tsvangirai was badly beaten on 12 March 2007 after being arrested and held at Machipisa Police Station in the Highfield suburb of Harare. The event garnered an international outcry and was considered particularly brutal and extreme, even considering the reputation of Mugabe's government. Kolawole Olaniyan, Director of Amnesty International's Africa Programme said "We are very concerned by reports of continuing brutal attacks on opposition activists in Zimbabwe and call on the government to stop all acts of violence and intimidation against opposition activists".

The economy has shrunk by 50% from 2000 to 2007. In September 2007 the inflation rate was put at almost 8,000%, the world's highest. There are frequent power and water outages. Harare's drinking water became unreliable in 2006 and as a consequence dysentery and cholera swept the city in December 2006 and January 2007. Unemployment in formal jobs is running at a record 80%. There was widespread hunger, manipulated by the government so that opposition strongholds suffer the most. Availability of bread was severely constrained after a poor wheat harvest and the closure of all bakeries.

The country, which used to be one of Africa's richest, became one of its poorest. Many observers now view the country as a 'failed state'. The settlement of the Second Congo War brought back Zimbabwe's substantial military commitment, although some troops remain to secure the mining assets under their control. The government lacks the resources or machinery to deal with the ravages of the HIV/AIDS pandemic, which affects 25% of the population. With all this and the forced and violent removal of white farmers in a brutal land redistribution program, Mugabe has earned himself widespread scorn from the international arena.

The regime has managed to cling to power by creating wealthy enclaves for government ministers, and senior party members. For example, Borrowdale Brook, a suburb of Harare is an oasis of wealth and privilege. It features mansions, manicured lawns, full shops with fully stocked shelves containing an abundance of fruit and vegetables, big cars and a golf club give is the home to President Mugabe's out-of-town retreat.

Zimbabwe's bakeries shut down in October 2007 and supermarkets warned that they would have no bread for the foreseeable future due to collapse in wheat production after the seizure of white-owned farms. The ministry of agriculture has also blamed power shortages for the wheat shortfall, saying that electricity cuts have affected irrigation and halved crop yields per acre. The power shortages are because Zimbabwe relies on Mozambique for some of its electricity and that due to an unpaid bill of $35 million Mozambique had reduced the amount of electrical power it supplies. On 4 December 2007, The United States imposed travel sanctions against 38 people with ties to President Mugabe because they "played a central role in the regime's escalated human rights abuses."

On 8 December 2007, Mugabe attended a meeting of EU and African leaders in Lisbon, prompting UK Prime Minister Gordon Brown to decline to attend. While German chancellor Angela Merkel criticised Mugabe with her public comments, the leaders of other African countries offered him statements of support.

=== Deterioration of the educational system ===
The educational system in Zimbabwe, which was once regarded as among the best in Africa, went into crisis in 2007 because of the country's economic meltdown. One foreign reporter witnessed hundreds of children at Hatcliffe Extension Primary School in Epworth, 19 kilometres (12 miles) west of Harare, writing in the dust on the floor because they had no exercise books or pencils. The high school exam system unravelled in 2007. Examiners refused to mark examination papers when they were offered just Z$79 a paper, enough to buy three small candies. Corruption has crept into the system and may explain why in January 2007 thousands of pupils received no marks for subjects they had entered, while others were deemed "excellent" in subjects they had not sat. However, as of late the education system has recovered and is still considered the best in Southern Africa.

== 2008 ==
=== 2008 elections ===
Zimbabwe held a presidential election along with a 2008 parliamentary election of 29 March. The three major candidates were incumbent President Robert Mugabe of the Zimbabwe African National Union – Patriotic Front (ZANU-PF), Morgan Tsvangirai of the Movement for Democratic Change – Tsvangirai (MDC-T), and Simba Makoni, an independent. As no candidate received an outright majority in the first round, a second round was held on 27 June 2008 between Tsvangirai (with 47.9% of the first round vote) and Mugabe (43.2%). Tsvangirai withdrew from the second round a week before it was scheduled to take place, citing violence against his party's supporters. The second round went ahead, despite widespread criticism, and led to victory for Mugabe.

Because of Zimbabwe's dire economic situation the election was expected to provide President Mugabe with his toughest electoral challenge to date. Mugabe's opponents were critical of the handling of the electoral process, and the government was accused of planning to rig the election; Human Rights Watch said that the election was likely to be "deeply flawed". After the first round, but before the counting was completed, Jose Marcos Barrica, the head of the Southern African Development Community observer mission, described the election as "a peaceful and credible expression of the will of the people of Zimbabwe."

No official results were announced for more than a month after the first round. The failure to release results was strongly criticised by the MDC, which unsuccessfully sought an order from the High Court to force their release. An independent projection placed Tsvangirai in the lead, but without the majority needed to avoid a second round. The MDC declared that Tsvangirai won a narrow majority in the first round and initially refused to participate in any second round. ZANU-PF has said that Mugabe will participate in a second round; the party alleged that some electoral officials, in connection with the MDC, fraudulently reduced Mugabe's score, and as a result a recount was conducted.

After the recount and the verification of the results, the Zimbabwe Electoral Commission (ZEC) announced on 2 May that Tsvangirai won 47.9% and Mugabe won 43.2%, thereby necessitating a run-off, which was to be held on 27 June 2008. Despite Tsvangirai's continuing claims to have won a first round majority, he refused to participate in the second round. The period following the first round was marked by serious political violence caused by ZANU-PF. ZANU-PF blamed the MDC supporters for perpetrating this violence; Western governments and prominent Western organisations have blamed ZANU-PF for the violence which seems very likely to be true. On 22 June 2008, Tsvangirai announced that he was withdrawing from the run-off, describing it as a "violent sham" and saying that his supporters risked being killed if they voted for him. The second round nevertheless went ahead as planned with Mugabe as the only actively participating candidate, although Tsvangirai's name remained on the ballot. Mugabe won the second round by an overwhelming margin and was sworn in for another term as president on 29 June.

The international reaction to the second round have varied. The United States and states of the European Union have called for increased sanctions. On 11 July, the United Nations Security Council voted to impose sanctions on the Zimbabwe; Russia and China vetoed. The African Union has called for a "government of national unity."

Preliminary talks to set up conditions for official negotiations began between leading negotiators from both parties on 10 July, and on 22 July, the three party leaders met for the first time in Harare to express their support for a negotiated settlement of disputes arising out of the presidential and parliamentary elections. Negotiations between the parties officially began on 25 July and are currently proceeding with very few details released from the negotiation teams in Pretoria, as coverage by the media is barred from the premises where the negotiations are taking place. The talks were mediated by South African President Thabo Mbeki.

On 15 September 2008, the leaders of the 14-member Southern African Development Community witnessed the signing of the power-sharing agreement, brokered by South African leader Thabo Mbeki. With symbolic handshake and warm smiles at the Rainbow Towers hotel, in Harare, Mugabe and Tsvangirai signed the deal to end the violent political crisis. As provided, Robert Mugabe will remain president, Morgan Tsvangirai will become prime minister, ZANU-PF and the MDC will share control of the police, Mugabe's Zanu (PF) will command the Army, and Arthur Mutambara becomes deputy prime minister.

=== Marange diamond fields massacre ===
In November 2008 the Air Force of Zimbabwe was sent, after some police officers began refusing orders to shoot the illegal miners at Marange diamond fields. Up to 150 of the estimated 30,000 illegal miners were shot from helicopter gunships. In 2008 some Zimbabwean lawyers and opposition politicians from Mutare claimed that Shiri was the prime mover behind the military assaults on illegal diggers in the diamond mines in the east of Zimbabwe. Estimates of the death toll by mid-December range from 83 reported by the Mutare City Council, based on a request for burial ground, to 140 estimated by the (then) opposition Movement for Democratic Change - Tsvangirai party.

== 2009 to present ==
=== 2009–2025 ===
In January 2009, Morgan Tsvangirai announced that he would do as the leaders across Africa had insisted and join a coalition government as prime minister with his nemesis, President Robert Mugabe . On 11 February 2009 Tsvangirai was sworn in as the Prime Minister of Zimbabwe. By 2009 inflation had peaked at 500 billion % per year under the Mugabe government and the Zimbabwe currency was worthless. The opposition shared power with the Mugabe regime between 2009 and 2013, Zimbabwe switched to using the US dollar as currency and the economy improved reaching a growth rate of 10% per year.

In 2013 the Mugabe government won an election which The Economist described as "rigged," doubled the size of the civil service and embarked on "...misrule and dazzling corruption." However, the United Nations, African Union and SADC endorsed the elections as free and fair.

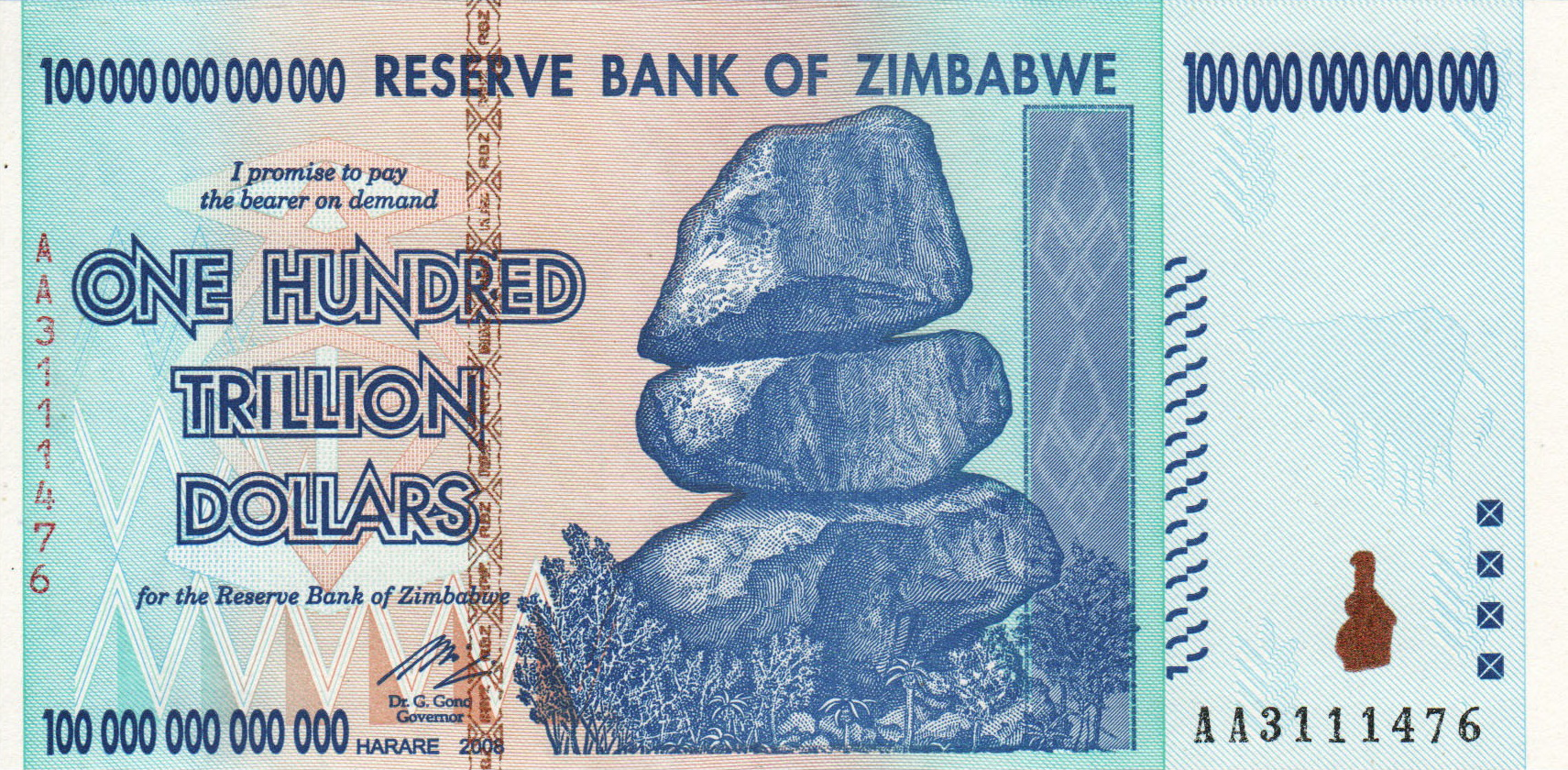
2009 Zimbabwe $100 trillion banknote

By 2016 the economy had collapsed, nationwide protests took place throughout the country and the finance minister admitted "Right now we literally have nothing." There was the introduction of bond notes to literally fight the biting cash crisis and liquidity crunch. Special Historical bonds was created to help the economy but never seen the light and was kept by the then President Robert Mugabe. Cash became scarce on the market in the year 2017.

On Wednesday 15 November 2017 the military placed President Mugabe under house arrest and removed him from power. The military stated that the president was safe. The military placed tanks around government buildings in Harare and blocked the main road to the airport. Public opinion in the capital favored the dictators removal although they were uncertain about his replacement with another dictatorship. The Times reported that Emmerson Mnangagwa helped to orchestrate the coup. He had recently been sacked by Mugabe so that the path could be smoothed for Grace Mugabe to replace her husband. A Zimbabwean army officer, Major General Sibusiso Moyo, went on television to say the military was targeting "criminals" around President Mugabe but not actively removing the president from power. However the head of the African Union described it as such.

Ugandan writer Charles Onyango-Obbo stated on Twitter "If it looks like a coup, walks like a coup and quacks like a coup, then it's a coup". Naunihal Singh, an assistant professor at the U.S. Naval War College and author of a book on military coups, described the situation in Zimbabwe as a coup. He tweeted that "'The President is safe' is a classic coup catch-phrase" of such an event.

Robert Mugabe resigned 21 November 2017. Second Vice-president Phelekezela Mphoko became the Acting President. Former Vice-president and new ZANU-PF -leader, Emmerson Mnangagwa, was sworn in as president on 24 November 2017.

=== 2018–2019 ===
General elections were held on 30 July 2018 to elect the president and members of both houses of parliament. Ruling party ZANU-PF won the majority of seats in parliament, incumbent President Emmerson Mnangagwa was declared the winner after receiving 50.8% of votes. The opposition accused the government of rigging the vote. In subsequent riots by MDC supporters, the army opened fire and killed three people, while three others died of their injuries the following day.

In January 2019 following a 130% increase in the price of fuel thousands of Zimbabweans protested and the government responded with a coordinated crackdown that resulted in hundreds of arrests and multiple deaths.

In September 2019, former president Robert Mugabe died in Singapore, aged 95.

In September 2023, Zimbabwe signed control over almost 20% of the country's land to the carbon offset company Blue Carbon.

Economic statistics 2021

GDP growth in Zimbabwe is projected to reach 3.9% in 2021, a significant improvement after a two-year recession, according to the World Bank Zimbabwe Economic Update.

=== 2023 Zimbabwean general election ===
In August 2025, President Emmerson Mnangagwa won a second term in an outcome of the election rejected by the opposition and questioned by observers.

== See also ==
- History of Africa
- Zimbabwe:
  - Land reform in Zimbabwe
  - Economic history of Zimbabwe
  - Education in Zimbabwe
  - Foreign relations of Zimbabwe
  - List of presidents of Zimbabwe
  - Politics of Zimbabwe
  - Prime Minister of Zimbabwe
  - Bulawayo history and timeline
  - Harare history and timeline
  - Years in Zimbabwe
- Rhodesia:
  - President of Rhodesia
  - Prime Minister of Rhodesia
  - Governor of Southern Rhodesia
