= Vice-president of Zimbabwe =

Deputy head of state and of government

Vice-Presidents of the Republic of Zimbabwe
- Coat of arms of Zimbabwe

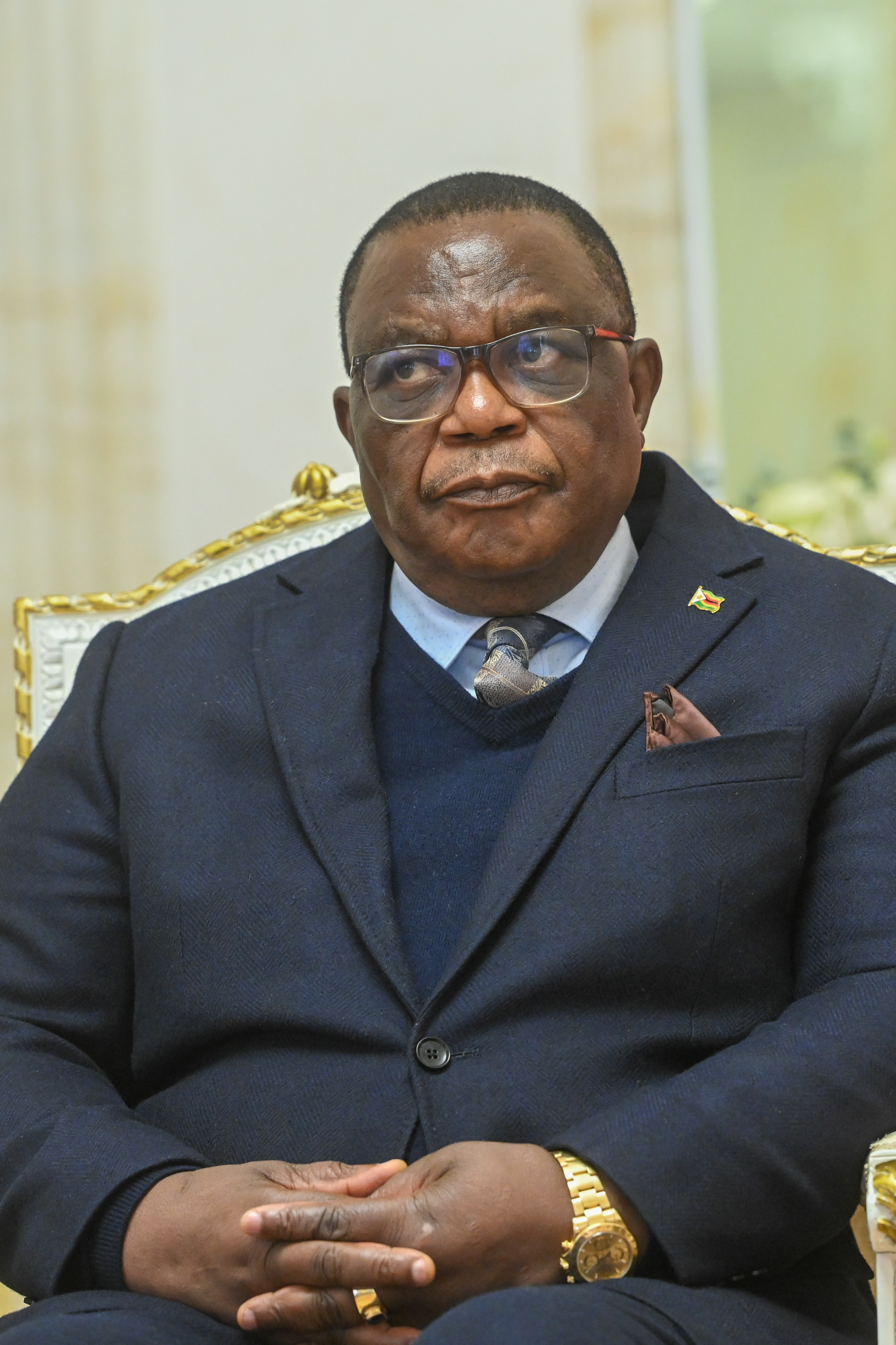
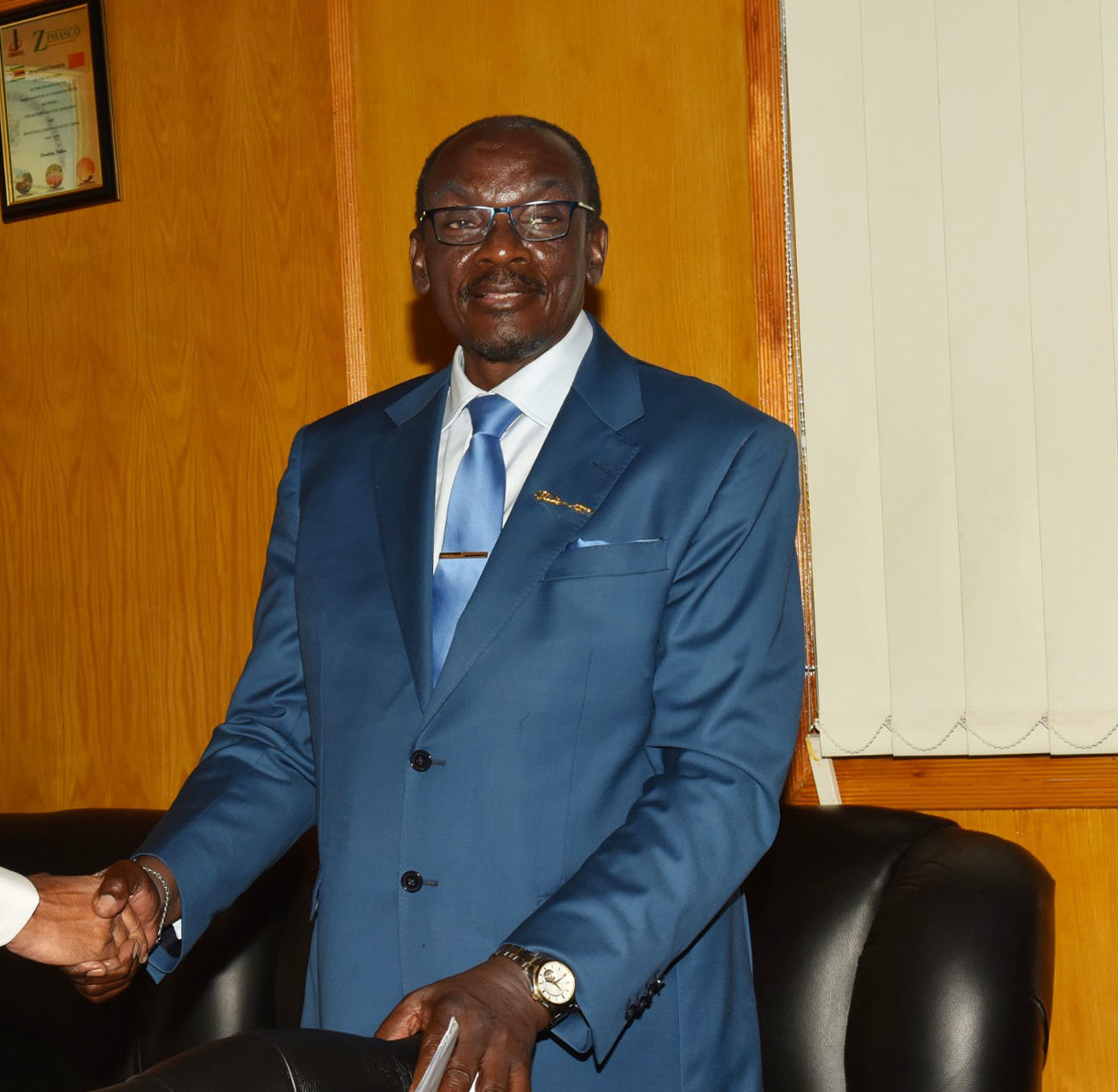
- Incumbent Constantino Chiwenga (First) Kembo Mohadi (Second) since 28 December 2017 (First) since 8 September 2023 (Second)
- Office of the President and Cabinet
- Style: His Excellency (diplomatic); The Honourable (formal); Mr Vice President (informal)
- Status: Second highest executive branch office
- Member of: Cabinet
- Seat: Harare
- Appointer: President of Zimbabwe
- Term length: Seven years, renewable once
- Constituting instrument: Constitution of Zimbabwe (2013)
- Inaugural holder: Simon Muzenda (First); Joshua Nkomo (Second)
- Formation: 31 December 1987 (38 years ago)
- Salary: Undisclosed
- Website: www.theopc.gov.zw

The vice-president of Zimbabwe is the second-highest political office in Zimbabwe. The Constitution provides for two vice-presidents, designated as the first vice-president and the second vice-president. The designations reflect their position in the presidential order of succession. The vice-presidents are appointed by the president of Zimbabwe and serve at the president's pleasure.

Under the ruling ZANU–PF party, the office of first vice-president has traditionally been reserved for a senior member of the party's historical ZANU wing (primarily associated with the Shona majority), while the second vice-president has been reserved for a senior member of the historical ZAPU wing (primarily associated with the Ndebele). This informal arrangement has been a key feature of post-independence power-sharing within the ruling party.

== History ==
=== Lancaster House Constitution (1980–2013) ===
The 1980 Lancaster House Constitution initially established a parliamentary system with a ceremonial president and an executive prime minister. Following the 1987 constitutional amendments that created an executive presidency, the office of vice-president was introduced. Joshua Nkomo, leader of the former ZAPU, was appointed as one of the first vice-presidents in 1987 as part of the unity accord between ZANU and ZAPU.

Between 1987 and 1990, the Constitution provided for only one vice-president. In 1990, it was amended to allow for two vice-presidents, formalising the practice of having one from each of the former liberation movements within ZANU–PF.

=== 2013 Constitution and subsequent amendments ===
The 2013 Constitution initially retained a running-mate system, under which vice-presidents were elected on the same ticket as the president. The Constitution of Zimbabwe Amendment (No. 2) Act, 2021, removed this system. Under the current framework, the president is elected directly and subsequently appoints up to two vice-presidents. The vice-presidents are no longer directly elected by the people.

== Constitutional role and powers ==
The vice-presidents have limited independent constitutional powers. Their primary roles include:

- Acting as president in the event of the president's death, resignation, removal from office, or incapacity (in order of designation).
- Assisting the president in the execution of executive functions as may be delegated by the president.
- Presiding over meetings of the Cabinet in the absence of the president.
- Representing the president at official functions, both domestically and internationally.

The vice-presidents are members of the Cabinet and the National Security Council. They do not possess independent powers to dismiss ministers or make major unilateral policy decisions.

== Selection and tenure ==
Since the 2021 constitutional amendment, vice-presidents are appointed by the president rather than elected. There is no requirement for parliamentary approval of these appointments. The president may appoint and remove vice-presidents at will. The Constitution does not impose specific qualifications for the office beyond those required for the president (Zimbabwean citizenship by birth or descent, minimum age of forty, and registration as a voter).

== Comparison with other systems ==
Unlike the vice president of the United States, who is elected on the same ticket as the president and serves as president of the Senate, Zimbabwean vice-presidents have no legislative role in Parliament and are not elected by popular vote. Their position is closer to that of appointed deputies in many other African presidential systems, where the office primarily ensures executive continuity and manages internal party balances.

== List of officeholders ==
Political parties

ZANU–PF
Independent

Symbols

^{†} Died in office

=== First vice-presidents ===
No.	Picture	Name (Birth–Death)	Term of office			Political party	President
No.	Picture	Name (Birth–Death)	Took office	Left office	Time in office	Political party	President
1		Simon Muzenda (1922–2003)	31 December 1987; Sole vice-president until 6 August 1990	20 September 2003^{[†]}	15 years, 263 days	ZANU–PF	Robert Mugabe (1987–2017)
2		Joice Mujuru (born 1955)	6 December 2004	8 December 2014	10 years, 2 days	ZANU–PF	Robert Mugabe (1987–2017)
3		Emmerson Mnangagwa (born 1942)	12 December 2014	6 November 2017	2 years, 329 days	ZANU–PF (Note: Until 2017, expelled and later reinstated into the party after the coup d'état.)	Robert Mugabe (1987–2017)
Post vacant (6 November – 28 December 2017)							Robert Mugabe (1987–2017)
Post vacant (6 November – 28 December 2017)							Emmerson Mnangagwa (since 2017)
4		Constantino Chiwenga (born 1956)	28 December 2017	Incumbent	8 years, 254 days	ZANU–PF	Emmerson Mnangagwa (since 2017)

=== Second vice-presidents ===
No.	Picture	Name (Birth–Death)	Term of office			Political party	President
No.	Picture	Name (Birth–Death)	Took office	Left office	Time in office	Political party	President
1		Joshua Nkomo (1917–1999)	6 August 1990	1 July 1999^{[†]}	8 years, 329 days	ZANU–PF	Robert Mugabe (1987–2017)
2		Joseph Msika (1923–2009)	23 December 1999	4 August 2009^{[†]}	9 years, 224 days	ZANU–PF	Robert Mugabe (1987–2017)
3		John Nkomo (1934–2013)	14 December 2009	17 January 2013^{[†]}	3 years, 34 days	ZANU–PF	Robert Mugabe (1987–2017)
4		Phelekezela Mphoko (1940–2024)	12 December 2014	27 November 2017	2 years, 350 days	ZANU–PF (Note: Until 2017, expelled from the party after the coup d'état.)	Robert Mugabe (1987–2017)
(4)		Phelekezela Mphoko (1940–2024)	12 December 2014	27 November 2017	2 years, 350 days	Independent	Emmerson Mnangagwa (since 2017)
Post vacant (27 November – 28 December 2017)							Emmerson Mnangagwa (since 2017)
5		Kembo Mohadi (born 1949)	28 December 2017	1 March 2021	3 years, 63 days	ZANU–PF	Emmerson Mnangagwa (since 2017)
Post vacant (1 March 2021 – 8 September 2023)							Emmerson Mnangagwa (since 2017)
(6)		Kembo Mohadi (born 1949)	8 September 2023	Incumbent	3 years, 0 days	ZANU–PF	Emmerson Mnangagwa (since 2017)

== Rank by time in office ==
=== First vice-presidents ===
Rank	Vice president	Time in office
1	Simon Muzenda	15 years, 263 days
2	Joice Mujuru	10 years, 2 days
3	Constantino Chiwenga	8 years, 254 days
4	Emmerson Mnangagwa	2 years, 329 days

=== Second vice-presidents ===
Rank	Vice president	Time in office
1	Joseph Msika	9 years, 224 days
2	Joshua Nkomo	8 years, 329 days
3	Kembo Mohadi	3 years, 63 days
4	John Nkomo	3 years, 34 days
5	Phelekezela Mphoko	2 years, 350 days

== See also ==
- President of Zimbabwe
- Prime Minister of Zimbabwe
- List of current vice presidents
