= Zimbabwe Catholic Bishops' Conference =

Assembly of Catholic bishops

The Zimbabwe Catholic Bishops' Conference (ZCBC), established by the Holy See on October 1, 1969, is the episcopal conference of the Catholic Church in Zimbabwe. The statutes of the Conference were approved on March 25, 1981.

The ZCBC is a member of the Inter-Regional Meeting of Bishops of Southern Africa (IMBISA) and Symposium of Episcopal Conferences of Africa and Madagascar (SECAM).

The primary objective of the ZCBC is to promote solidarity among the bishops of Zimbabwe, and promotion of self-sufficiency among each of the dioceses.

== Presidents ==
1. Donal Lamont, Bishop of Umtali (1970–1972)
2. Aloysius Haene, Bishop of Gwelo (1972–1974)
3. Ignacio Prieto Vega, Bishop of Wankie (1974–1975)
4. Ernst Heinrich Karlen, Archbishop of Bulawayo (1975–1977)
5. Patrick Fani Chakaipa, Archbishop of Harare (1977–1984)
6. Tobias Wunganayi Chiginya, Bishop of Gweru (1984–1987)
7. Alexio Churu Muchabaiwa, Bishop of Mutare (1987–1990)
8. Helmut Reckter, Bishop of Chinhoyi (1990–1994)
9. Francis Xavier Mugadzi, Bishop of Gweru (1994–1998)
10. Alexio Churu Muchabaiwa, Bishop of Mutare (1998–2002)
11. Michael Dixon Bhasera, Bishop of Masvingo (2002–2006)
12. Robert Ndlovu, Archbishop of Harare (2006–2011)
13. Ángel Floro Martínez, Bishop of Gokwe (2011–2014)
14. Michael Dixon Bhasera, Bishop of Masvingo (2014–present)
