= List of Catholic dioceses in Zimbabwe =

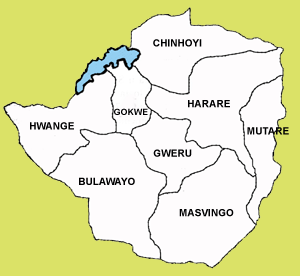
Map of the eight Roman Catholic dioceses in Zimbabwe

The Catholic Church in Zimbabwe (in southern Africa; formerly (Southern) Rhodesia) is composed only of a Latin hierarchy, joint in the national Episcopal Conference of Zimbabwe, comprising two ecclesiastical provinces, each headed by a Metropolitan with three suffragan dioceses each.

There are no Eastern Catholic, pre-diocesan or other exempt jurisdictions.

All defunct jurisdictions have current Latin successor sees.

There is an Apostolic Nunciature to Zimbabwe as papal diplomatic representation (embassy-level) in the national capital Harare (formerly Salisbury, Rhodesia)).

== Current Latin sees ==
=== Ecclesiastical Province of Bulawayo ===
- Metropolitan Archdiocese of Bulawayo
  - Diocese of Gweru
  - Diocese of Hwange
  - Diocese of Masvingo

=== Ecclesiastical Province of Harare ===
- Metropolitan Archdiocese of Harare
  - Diocese of Chinhoyi
  - Diocese of Gokwe
  - Diocese of Mutare

== See also ==
- Catholic Church in Zimbabwe
- List of Catholic dioceses (structured view)
