= Eusebius Jelous Nyathi =

Zimbabwean Roman Catholic prelate (born 1974)

The Most Reverend Eusebius Jelous Nyathi
- Bishop of Gokwe, Zimbabwe
- Church: Catholic Church
- Archdiocese: Roman Catholic Archdiocese of Harare
- See: Gokwe
- Appointed: 23 June 2023
- Installed: 23 September 2023
- Predecessor: Rudolf Nyandoro
- Successor: Incumbent

Orders
- Ordination: 17 June 2004
- Consecration: 23 September 2023 by Robert Christopher Ndlovu
- Rank: Bishop

Personal details
- Born: Eusebius Jelous Nyathi; 2 August 1974 (age 51) Hwange, Matabeleland North, Diocese of Hwange, Zimbabwe

Styles of Eusebius Jelous Nyathi
- Reference style: Your Lordship; The Most Reverend
- Spoken style: His Lordship
- Religious style: Bishop

Eusebius Jelous Nyathi (born 2 August 1974) is a Zimbabwean Roman Catholic prelate who is the Bishop of the Roman Catholic Diocese of Gokwe, Zimbabwe since 2023. He was appointed bishop by Pope Francis on 23 June 2023. He was consecrated and installed there on 23 September 2023.

== Background and education ==
He was born on 2 August 1974, at Hwange, Matabeleland North, Diocese of Hwange, Zimbabwe. He attended the Dete Minor Seminary at Dete and then entered the Mazowe Preparatory Seminary at Mazowe. He studied at the Chishawasha National Major Seminary, graduating from there with a Diploma in philosophy and a Bachelor of Arts degree in Theology.

Later from 2011 until 2013 he studied at Diocesan Seminary of Tenerife in Spain, specializing in Theology.

== Priest ==
On 17 June 2004, he was ordained a priest of the Roman Catholic Diocese of Hwange. He served in that capacity until 23 June 2023.

As a priest, he served in various roles in different locations including:

- Vice-Rector of the Diocesan Minor Seminary in Hwange Diocese from 2004 until 2005.
- Vice-promoter of vocations in Hwange Diocese from 2004 until 2005.
- Parish priest of St. Mary's Parish from 2005 until 2008.
- Head of the mission of the Chimuniko Pastoral Center from 2005 until 2008.
- Director of the mission of the Chimuniko Pastoral Center from 2005 until 2008.
- Rector of the Diocesan Minor Seminary from 2008 until 2011.
- Diocesan promoter of vocations in Hwange Diocese from 2008 until 2011.
- Lecturer and formator at St. John Fisher and St. Thomas More National Major Seminary at Chishawasha near Harare from 2014 until 2022.
- Vice-Rector for the Theology section of St. John Fisher and St. Thomas More National Major Seminary at Chishawasha from 2015 until 2022.
- Diocesan delegate for the permanent formation of the clergy, since 2016.
- Rector of St. John Fisher and St. Thomas More National Major Seminary at Chishawasha from 2022 until 2023.

== As bishop ==
On 23 June 2023, Pope Francis appointed Reverend Father Eusebius Jelous Nyathi as Bishop of the Roman Catholic Diocese of Gokwe in Zimbabwe. He was consecrated and installed in front of Saint Paul's Primary School, Gokwe, in the Diocese of Gokwe on 23 September 2023. The Principal Consecrator was Archbishop Robert Christopher Ndlovu, Archbishop of Harare assisted by Bishop Rudolf Nyandoro, Bishop of Gweru and Bishop Raphael Macebo Mabuza Ncube, Bishop of Hwange.

== See also ==
- Catholic Church in Zimbabwe

== Succession table ==
Catholic Church titles
Preceded by Rudolf Nyandoro (28 January 2017 - 11 September 2020)	Bishop of Gokwe (since 23 June 2023)	Succeeded by Incumbent
