= Mike Auret =

Zimbabwean Catholic activist and politician

Member of the House of Assembly of Zimbabwe for Harare Central
- In office 2000 – 27 February 2003
- Preceded by: Florence Chitauro
- Succeeded by: Murisi Zwizwai

Personal details
- Born: 14 December 1936 Umtali, Southern Rhodesia (now Mutare, Zimbabwe)
- Died: 10 April 2020 (aged 83) Cloghan, County Offaly, Ireland
- Party: Movement for Democratic Change
- Occupation: Farmer, politician

Military service
- Allegiance: Federation of Rhodesia and Nyasaland
- Branch/service: Federal Army; Southern Rhodesian Army
- Years of service: 1956–1966
- Rank: Captain

Michael Theodore Hayes Auret (14 December 1936 – 10 April 2020) was a Zimbabwean farmer, politician, and activist. A devout Catholic, he served as chairman and later director of the Catholic Commission for Justice and Peace in Zimbabwe (CCJP) from 1978 until 1999. He also served as a member of Parliament for Harare Central from 2000 to 2003, when he resigned and emigrated to Ireland.

Born in Mutare, Southern Rhodesia, and raised in the Mberengwa area, Auret came from a family of farmers. After leaving St. George's College in 1955, he served in the armies of the Federation of Rhodesia and Nyasaland and Southern Rhodesia for ten years. He took up cattle farming in Mberengwa from 1966 to 1978, after which he joined the Catholic Commission for Justice and Peace. Soon after, he received a conscription notice from the Rhodesian Security Forces and rather than enlisting, fled with his family to the United Kingdom. He returned to the independent Zimbabwe in 1980 and resumed work with the CCJP. During the 1980s, he led the organization's efforts to document and put an end to the Gukurahundi massacres, perpetrated in Matabeleland by forces directed by Prime Minister Robert Mugabe's government.

Auret left the commission in 1999 and became involved in the political opposition to Mugabe and his ruling ZANU–PF party. In 2000, he was elected to Parliament for the newly formed Movement for Democratic Change. Amid escalating political violence and reportedly due to ill health, he resigned in 2003 and emigrated, first to Cape Town, South Africa, and then to County Offaly, Ireland, where he remained until his death in 2020.

== Early life and military service ==
Michael Theodore Hayes Auret was born on 14 December 1936 in Umtali, Southern Rhodesia. The descendant of Huguenot settlers in South Africa, he came from a family of farmers who had settled in eastern Southern Rhodesia. His father, Smiley Auret, farmed in Belingwe District, where Auret would later also farm. Auret began his education at a Dominican convent school in Umtali, and then studied from 1947 to 1955 at the Jesuit-run St. George's College in the capital, Salisbury, where he father had been one of the first students in 1898.

He initially planned to become a Catholic priest until he met and married his wife, Diana Doherty, in 1958. In 1956, he joined the army of the Federation of Rhodesia and Nyasaland and was stationed in Ndola, Northern Rhodesia. When the Federation dissolved in 1963, he returned home and joined the Southern Rhodesian Army. He resigned as a captain in 1966, shortly after Rhodesia's Unilateral Declaration of Independence.

== Career and activism ==
=== Rhodesia ===
After leaving the army in 1966, Auret went on to manage a 27,000-acre cattle farm in Belingwe, about 200 kilometres (120 mi) from Bulawayo. In the leadup to the 1969 constitutional referendum, Auret campaigned against the adoption of a republican form of government that would end Rhodesia's ties to the British monarchy. The proposed constitution was supported overwhelming by the country's white voters, and Rhodesia became a republic in 1970. In 1974, Auret unsuccessfully ran for Parliament for the Bulawayo District constituency. Representing the moderate Rhodesia Party, he lost with 22.5 percent of the vote to the incumbent MP, Alec Moseley of the Rhodesian Front, who received 77.5 percent of the 1,613 votes cast. In early 1977, during the Rhodesian Bush War, black guerrillas burned down the house of Auret's assistant farm manager, but spared Auret's home and his farm equipment. The guerrillas left two notes, one of which said, "We don't hate whites. We left your property because you are a friend of the people."

In 1978, Auret abandoned farming and began working for the Catholic Commission for Justice and Peace in Rhodesia (CCJP), a human rights organization putting him at odds with the government. He was motivated by a desire to expose war atrocities by Rhodesian forces, who had tortured some of his farm workers. Not long after, he received a conscription notice from the Rhodesian Security Forces. Auret was in Rome with two Rhodesian bishops on a CCJP trip to meet Pope John Paul II, and was advised not to return to Rhodesia. His wife and children discreetly packed their things and left the country. After reuniting in Rome, the family went to Switzerland and then the United Kingdom, where they were eventually granted refugee status. There, Auret worked Part-time jobs to support his family. In 1979, while still in exile, he was part of a delegation of Rhodesians to the United States seeking assistance in facilitating the start of peace talks. Later that year, negotiations did occur, resulting in the Lancaster House Agreement, which ended the war and set the stage for Rhodesia's reconstitution as the internationally recognized, independent Zimbabwe.

=== Catholic Commission for Justice and Peace and Gukurahundi ===
Auret returned to Zimbabwe soon after the 1980 general election that determined the country's first government and Parliament. He started work training small-scale black farmers. He became chairman of the renamed Catholic Commission for Justice and Peace in Zimbabwe, and began documenting atrocities committed by Zimbabwean forces during the Gukurahundi massacres in the Matabeleland region. Auret arranged a 16 March 1983 meeting at State House in Harare between himself, a delegation of Catholic bishops, and Prime Minister Robert Mugabe, in an effort to stop the killings. The bishops present included the Archbishop of Bulawayo, Heinrich Karlen, Mutare auxiliary bishop Patrick Mutume, and the Bishop of Chinhoyi, Helmut Reckter. As a result of the meeting, Mugabe lifted the curfew that had been in place and named a commission of inquiry to investigate the violence. Karlen provided a large amount of evidence he had collected, but when the commission concluded its work in 1984, Mugabe prevented its findings from being released. The Legal Resources Foundation, a non-governmental organization, sought a court order for their release, but its application was denied.

Under Auret's direction, the CCJP to start its own investigations to ensure the violence would be publicly documented. The report, published jointly by the CCJP and Legal Resources Foundation and presented by Auret to Mugabe, was entitled "Breaking the Silence: Building True Peace." It estimated that roughly 20,000 people were killed or disappeared over the course of the Gukurahundi, which lasted from 1983 to 1987. The report was ignored by the Archbishop of Harare, Patrick Chakaipa, a Mugabe ally, and was only endorsed by Archbishop Karlen and one other influential Catholic. It did not make much of an impact in Zimbabwe at the time, but was sent to South Africa's Mail & Guardian newspaper, which reported on it and published a copy online.

On 5 June 1986, Auret was detained by police, along with CCJP director Nicholas Ndebele. They were released later that day after Auret's wife, Diana, phoned Prime Minister Mugabe. Mugabe said he had already ordered their release. At a press conference in Harare the next day, Auret thanked the prime minister and said he believed he and Ndebele had been detained because the home affairs minister, Enos Nkala, suspected the CCJP of providing information about human rights in Zimbabwe to Amnesty International, a London-based watchdog organization. Auret added that the CCJP had met with Nkala in December 1985 to deny the allegations, but that he did not think Nkala believed them.

Auret served as chairman of the CCJP until 1990, after which he became the organization's director. In February 1999, President Mugabe made a veiled threat against Auret during a televised address. Auret retired from the CCJP in 1999.

=== Opposition politics and election to Parliament ===
Auret joined the National Constituent Assembly (NCA) when it was established in 1997, and served as its first vice chairman under Morgan Tsvangirai. He joined the newly formed Movement for Democratic Change (MDC) in 1999, and successfully stood as the party's candidate in the June 2000 parliamentary election for Harare Central. He had been selected in April of that year to stand as the MDC candidate in that constituency over Learnmore Jongwe, the party's secretary for information and publicity, and Paurina Gwanyanya, the secretary for labour. He won overwhelmingly with 14,207 votes, defeating former deputy mayor of Harare, Winston Dzawo of ZANU–PF, who received 3,620 votes, as well as two minor candidates.

In February 2001, Auret was warned by a colleague with connections to ZANU–PF that leaders within the ruling party were planning to "take out" a prominent white MDC member by the end of the month. The MDC had three white parliamentarians at the time, Auret, David Coltart, and Trudy Stevenson. Stevenson excluded herself and said she thought the target would be either Auret or Coltart, who were both frequently singled out for criticism by Mugabe in speeches. Coltart confirmed Stevenson's statements to a US State Department contact. Coltart said he had been received information from three sources, including Clive Puzey, an MDC colleague with a contact in the Central Intelligence Organisation, that he—not Auret—was the target.

== Later life and death ==
Amid escalating political violence and reportedly due to ill health, Auret resigned his seat in Parliament on 27 February 2003. He emigrated to Cape Town, South Africa, and then Ireland, where he settled in County Offaly and worked for the Catholic Church. He wrote a book, From Liberator to Dictator: An Insider's Account of Robert Mugabe's Descent into Tyranny, published in 2009, in which he described how he misjudged Mugabe's intentions at independence in 1980. He stated at an event in London in 2007 that he "didn't take in that [Mugabe] was a committed Marxist and that he wanted a one-party state."

Auret died at his home in Cloghan, County Offaly, Ireland, on 10 April 2020. Due to Health Service Executive directives against public gatherings due to the COVID-19 pandemic, his funeral was held privately. In a statement posted on its official Facebook page, the Movement for Democratic Change called Auret a "hero and a patriot," and gave its condolences to his family. Senator David Coltart, who had worked with Auret on the CCJP's Gukurahundi investigations, stated, "If there ever was a true Zimbabwean hero, it was Mike." MDC president Nelson Chamisa, who knew Auret from the NCA and MDC, described him as a "consistent gallant fighter, an indefatigable defender of human rights... our HERO!" A statement by Zimbabwe Catholic Bishops' Conference read, "The Catholic Church in Zimbabwe learned with sadness of the death of Mr Michael Auret... he excelled in promoting human rights, justice and peace in Zimbabwe."

== Family and personal life ==
Auret was married to his wife, Diana, for 63 years. Together, they had four children, Peter, Margaret, Stephen, and Michael Jr. His brothers and sisters lived in Australia. Auret was a lifelong and devout Catholic. His inspirations included Pope John Paul II, Pope Francis, and Fr. Patrick Galvin, an Irish priest in South Africa.

After leaving his farm in Belingwe, Auret lived in Harare in a house on an acre of land with a swimming pool. He also owned a vacation property near Nyanga. After emigrating to Ireland, he lived in the town of Cloghan, County Offaly, until his death.
