= Alexio Churu Muchabaiwa =

Zimbabwean Roman Catholic prelate (1939–2024)

The Most Reverend Alexio Churu Muchabaiwa
- Bishop Emeritus of Mutare, Zimbabwe (Deceased)
- Church: Catholic Church
- Archdiocese: Roman Catholic Archdiocese of Harare
- See: Roman Catholic Diocese of Mutare
- Appointed: 5 November 1981
- Installed: 21 February 1982
- Term ended: 28 May 2016
- Predecessor: Donal Raymond Lamont
- Successor: Paul Horan
- Other posts: Priest of Salisbury, Rhodesia (24 August 1968 - 5 November 1981)

Orders
- Ordination: 24 August 1968 by Archbishop Francis William Markall
- Consecration: 21 February 1982 by Donal Raymond Lamont
- Rank: Bishop

Personal details
- Born: Alexio Churu Muchabaiwa; June 21, 1939 Wedza, Apostolic Vicariate of Salisbury, Southern Rhodesia (now Zimbabwe)
- Died: January 8, 2024 (aged 84) Murambi Gardens Clinic, Mutare, Zimbabwe

Styles of Alexio Churu Muchabaiwa
- Reference style: Your Lordship; The Most Reverend
- Spoken style: His Lordship
- Religious style: Bishop

Alexio Churu Muchabaiwa (21 June 1939 – 8 January 2024) was a Zimbabwean Catholic prelate who was bishop of the Roman Catholic Diocese of Mutare from November 1981 until his retirement in May 2016. He was ordained a priest by Archbishop Markaal on 24 August 1968 at Mount St. Mary's Mission in Wedza in the Archdiocese of Harare. He was appointed bishop of Umtali (now Mutare) in 1981 and was ordained as a bishop of Umtali in 1982. He retired as bishop on 28 May 2016. Bishop Muchabaiwa died on 8 January 2024, at the age of 92.

== Early life and education ==
He was born on 21 June 1939 in Wedza District, Mashonaland East, in the Apostolic Vicariate of Salisbury in Southern Rhodesia. He attended Kutama Mission School, for his early education. He entered seminary in 1957, after overcoming initial parental resistance. Later in 1973 he graduated with a Diploma in Pastoral Theology from the Ggaba National Major Seminary in Ggaba, Kampala, Uganda. "He was ordained a priest in 1968, eleven years after joining the Seminary."

== Priest ==
On 24 August 1968 he was ordained a priest of Salisbury, Southern Rhodesia (now Zimbabwe) at the Mount St. Mary's Mission, Wedza, in the Archdiocese of Salisbury. The ceremony was led by Archbishop Francis William Markall, Archbishop of Salisbury. He served in that capacity until 5 November 1981.

As a priest, he worked in various roles in different locations including:

- Priest at Makumbe Mission from 1969 until 1972.
- Priest at St. Mary's Parish, Highfield, Harare, Zimbabwe.
- Spiritual Director of seminarians at Chishawasha Major Seminary near Harare.
- Rector of Chishawasha Major Seminary. While there, he instructed Archbishop Robert Christopher Ndlovu, Bishop Michael Dixon Bhasera, Bishop Martin Munyanyi and Bishop Xavier Munyongani among others.
- Vicar General of the Archdiocese of Harare and a chaplain to the first African Mayor of Harare, Tizirai Gwata.

== Bishop ==
On 5 November 1981 Pope John Paul II appointed him the Bishop of Mutare. He was ordained as the Bishop of Mutare and installed at the Holy Trinity Cathedral, Mutare, in the Diocese of Mutare on 21 February 1982. The Principal Consecrator was Bishop Donal Raymond Lamont, Bishop Emeritus of Umtali assisted by Archbishop Patrick Fani Chakaipa, Archbishop of Salisbury and Bishop Tobias Wunganayi Chiginya, Bishop of Gwelo. He succeeded Bishop Donal Raymond Lamont, who resigned. Bishop Alexio Churu Muchabaiwa retired on 28 May 2016, three weeks shy of his 77th birthday.

On Monday, 8 January 2024, the Right Reverend Bishop Alexio Churu Muchabaiwa, the Bishop Emeritus of Mutare, Zimbabwe died at the Murambi Gardens Clinic, Mutare. He was 92 years old.

He was buried on Thursday 11 January 2024 at Trashill Mission in Mutasa District in Manicaland Province, Zimbabwe, as he willed.

== See also ==
- Roman Catholicism in Zimbabwe

== Succession table ==
Catholic Church titles
| Preceded by Donal Raymond Lamont (15 February 1957 - 5 November 1981) | Bishop of Mutare (5 November 1981 - 28 May 2016) | Succeeded by Paul Horan (since 28 May 2016) |
