= Evangelista Weber =

Swiss missionary and superior general (1926–1991)

- Born: Gertrud Weber; 26 June 1926; Wohlen
- Died: 11 August 1991 (aged 65); Fribourg
- Occupations: Missionary, typographer, religious superior
- Known for: Press apostolate in Southern Rhodesia; superior general of the Canisius Sisters

Evangelista Weber (born Gertrud Weber; 26 June 1926 – 11 August 1991) was a Swiss Catholic missionary in the press apostolate in Southern Rhodesia (present-day Zimbabwe) and superior general of the congregation of the Sisters of Saint Peter Canisius.

== Life ==
After completing training as a typographer, Gertrud Weber entered the Sisters of Saint Petrus Canisius in Fribourg in 1953, taking the name in religion M. Evangelista. Founded in 1898 by Maria Wellauer and Jean Evangelist Kleiser, this Roman Catholic congregation had as its mission the proclamation of the Gospel through the dissemination of printed matter (press apostolate). At the request of the Bethlehem Mission Society, Sister Evangelista left for the semi-autonomous British colony of Southern Rhodesia in the spring of 1958, together with two other Canisius Sisters. In the diocese of Gwelo (Gweru), placed under the auspices of the Bethlehem Mission Society, she helped to set up a printing press. For eleven years, Weber worked in Gwelo as a typographer and was the superior of the six sisters devoted to the press apostolate there.

== Mambo Press and the press apostolate ==
Evangelization through the mass media, by means of the creation of a Catholic press, was an essential component of the mission of the Bethlehem Mission Society. In the colonial period, and then in Rhodesia, ruled from 1965 by a racist regime, the missionary publishing house Mambo Press supported African authors, trained journalists, and published the first—and for a long time only—newspaper in the Shona language (Moto). Until its ban in 1974, Moto was an important voice against the oppression of the Black population in the region. As a typographer, Sister Evangelista was not responsible for editorial decisions, but took part in the technical production of the publications and trained local staff in the work of the printing press.

== Return to Switzerland ==
Returning to Switzerland in 1969, Weber was elected superior general of the Sisters of Saint Peter Canisius in Fribourg. After leaving that office in 1974, she remained as an ordinary religious in Fribourg until her death.

== Bibliography ==
- Missionnaires de Bethléem, ed., Bethléem, 1965–1975.
- I. Linden, The Catholic Church and the Struggle for Zimbabwe, 1980.
- J. McLaughlin, On the Frontline. Catholic Missions in Zimbabwe's Liberation War, 1996.
- J. Elsener and B. Soliva, Freud und Leid des Volkes teilen. Vom Umgang mit dem Unabhängigkeitskrieg in Rhodesien/Simbabwe und der Apartheid in Südafrika, 2017.
- B. Miller, Entwicklung glauben. Katholische Mission in der Schweiz und in Simbabwes Dekolonisation, 2026.

=== Archives ===
- Archives de l'Evêché de Lausanne, Genève et Fribourg (LGF), Fribourg, Kanisius-Schwestern.
- Staatsarchiv Luzern, Lucerne, Missionsgesellschaft Bethlehem Immensee SMB.
