= Rudolf Nyandoro =

Zimbabwean Roman Catholic prelate (born 1968)

The Most Reverend Rudolf Nyandoro
- Bishop of Gweru, Zimbabwe
- Church: Catholic Church
- Archdiocese: Roman Catholic Archdiocese of Harare
- See: Gweru
- Appointed: 11 September 2020
- Installed: 24 October 2020
- Predecessor: Xavier Johnsai Munyongani
- Successor: Incumbent
- Other posts: Bishop of Gwoke (28 January 2017 - 11 September 2020); Apostolic Administrator of Gwoke (11 September 2020 - 23 September 2023)

Orders
- Ordination: 19 December 1998
- Consecration: 24 April 2017 by Michael Dixon Bhasera
- Rank: Bishop

Personal details
- Born: Rudolf Nyandoro; 11 October 1968 Gweru, Zimbabwe

Styles of Rudolf Nyandoro
- Reference style: Your Lordship; The Most Reverend
- Spoken style: His Lordship
- Religious style: Bishop

Rudolf Nyandoro (born 11 October 1968) is a Zimbabwean Roman Catholic prelate is the Bishop of Gweru, Zimbabwe since September 2020. Before that from January 2017 until September 2020, he was the bishop of the Roman Catholic Diocese of Gokwe, Zimbabwe. He was appointed Bishop of Gokwe on 28 January 2017 by Pope Francis. He was installed there on 29 April 2017. The Holy Father transferred him to Gweru, his home area, on 11 September 2020. He was installed at Gweru on 24 October 2020. Between 11 September 2020 and 23 September 2023 he concurrently served as Apostolic Administrator of Gokwe Catholic Diocese.

== Early life and education ==
Nyandoro was born on 11 October 1968 in Gwelo, Rhodesia (today Gweru, Zimbabwe). After primary school, he attended the Minory Seminary of Chikwingwizha. From 1991 to 1994, he studied philosophy at St. Charles Lwanga Major Seminary in Chimanimani in the Diocese of Mutare. He then completed his theological studies at Chishawasha Major Seminary in the Archdiocese of Harare. He holds a BS and MS in Counseling from Zimbabwe Open University. In 2015, he earned his PhD in Pastoral Counseling from the University of South Africa.

== Priesthood ==
Nyandoro was ordained a priest of the Diocese of Masvingo on 19 December 1998. In 1999, he worked as an assistant priest at the Mukaro Mission, before serving from 2000 to 2006 as the rector of Sts. Peter and Paul Cathedral in Masvingo. From 2007 to 2009, he was rector of the diocesan minor seminary. He served as rector of Bondolfi Teachers' College from 2010 to 2015. From 2015 to 2017, he was the Chancellor of the Diocese of Masvingo and a professor at Bondolfi Teachers' College.

== Episcopate ==
On 28 January 2017, Nyandoro was appointed Bishop of Gokwe by Pope Francis. He was appointed to succeed Bishop Ángel Floro Martínez, who resigned on the same day. His episcopal ordination was held on 29 April 2017, on the ground of St. Paul's Primary School in Gokwe. Bishop Michael Dixon Bhasera, President of the Zimbabwe Catholic Bishops' Conference and Bishop of Masvingo, was the principal consecrator. Archbishop Marek Zalewski, Apostolic Nuncio to Zimbabwe, and Angel Floro Martínez, Bishop Emeritus of Gokwe, served as co-consecrators. In addition to bishops and clergy, the ordination ceremony was attended by thousands of laity. Congratulatory remarks were delivered by Archbishop Zalewski and Robert Ndlovu, Archbishop of Harare.

== Episcopal lineage ==
The following is Nyandoro's episcopal lineage:

- Cardinal Scipione Rebiba
- Cardinal Giulio Antonio Santorio (1566)
- Cardinal Girolamo Bernerio, OP (1586)
- Archbishop Galeazzo Sanvitale (1604)
- Cardinal Ludovico Ludovisi (1621)
- Cardinal Luigi Caetani (1622)
- Cardinal Ulderico Carpegna (1630)
- Cardinal Paluzzo Paluzzi Altieri Degli Albertoni (1666)
- Pope Benedict XIII (1675)
- Pope Benedict XIV (1724)
- Pope Clement XIII (1743)
- Cardinal Marcantonio Colonna (1762)
- Cardinal Hyacinthe Sigismond Gerdil, CRSP (1777)
- Cardinal Giulio Maria della Somaglia (1788)
- Cardinal Carlo Odescalchi, SJ (1823)
- Cardinal Costantino Patrizi Naro (1828)
- Cardinal Lucido Parocchi (1871)
- Pope Pius X (1884)
- Pope Benedict XV (1907)
- Cardinal Willem Marinus van Rossum, CSsR (1918)
- Archbishop Bernhard Gijlswijk, OP (1922)
- Bishop Aston Chichester, SJ (1931)
- Bishop Aloysius Haene, SMB (1950)
- Bishop Francis Xavier Mugadzi (1989)
- Bishop Michael Dixon Bhasera (1991)
- Bishop Rudolf Nyandoro (2017)
