= Gertrud Scheu =

Swiss lay missionary in Zimbabwe (1933–2013)

- Born: 28 February 1933; Frauenfeld
- Died: 23 March 2013 (aged 80); Driefontein, Zimbabwe
- Occupations: Kindergarten teacher, speech therapist, lay missionary
- Known for: Development programs in Southern Rhodesia and Zimbabwe

Gertrud Scheu (28 February 1933 – 23 March 2013) was a Swiss kindergarten teacher, speech therapist, adult educator, lay missionary, and director of development aid programs in Southern Rhodesia (present-day Zimbabwe).

== Early life and training ==
Scheu was the daughter of Hans Scheu, owner of a painting business, and Ida, née Frei. An only child, she grew up in Frauenfeld. After secondary school, she entered the kindergarten teachers' training college in Frauenfeld and undertook further training as a speech therapist. She never married and had no children.

== Mission in Southern Rhodesia and Zimbabwe ==
In 1961, following a meeting with Bishop Alois Häne, Scheu responded to the call of the Bethlehem Mission Society and traveled to the semi-autonomous British colony of Southern Rhodesia. As a lay collaborator in the diocese of Gwelo (Gweru), she directed the social-work programs for women and young people, which included courses in sewing and cooking, lectures on childcare, and the creation of youth centers and savings cooperatives. The aim was to pass on leadership and organizational skills to the women and young people from the local populations taking part, so that they could in turn share their new knowledge.

Scheu assumed major responsibilities in the Bethlehem Mission Society's development aid projects in the colony of Southern Rhodesia and then in Rhodesia, playing a leading role in particular in social work and youth activities. She moved between aid to the local populations and advocacy on their behalf, while collaborating with the institutions and representatives of the white minority government. In 1979, she obtained a bachelor's degree in adult education at the University College of Rhodesia and Nyasaland. She was a member of the commission for social service and development of the Rhodesian Bishops' Conference, founded in 1972 and later renamed Caritas Zimbabwe. During the war of liberation in the late 1970s, she worked closely with the International Red Cross. With the support of Swiss parishes, she co-founded an orphanage. She remained in Zimbabwe for the rest of her life.

== Lay women in Catholic missions ==
The influential position Scheu held as a laywoman within Catholic organizations can be explained by two factors. On the one hand, the redefinition of the Catholic conception of mission after the Second Vatican Council, marked by an increased emphasis on development aid projects, led to a reorganization of tasks. On the other, from the late 1960s, Catholic missions were increasingly confronted with a problem of recruitment, as the number of new entries into religious orders and communities dropped sharply. By integrating additional personnel and expanding into new fields, the missions opened up new horizons for lay women, enabling them to take on positions of responsibility.

== Bibliography ==
- Missionnaires de Bethléem, ed., Bethléem, 1961–2005.
- I. Linden, The Catholic Church and the Struggle for Zimbabwe, 1980.
- J. McLaughlin, On the Frontline. Catholic Missions in Zimbabwe's Liberation War, 1996.
- Mission Bethléem Immense, ed., Wendekreis, 2005–2013.
- J. Elsener and B. Soliva, Freud und Leid des Volkes teilen. Vom Umgang mit dem Unabhängigkeitskrieg in Rhodesien/Simbabwe und der Apartheid in Südafrika, 2017.
- B. Miller, Entwicklung glauben. Katholische Mission in der Schweiz und in Simbabwes Dekolonisation, 2026.

=== Archives ===
- Staatsarchiv Luzern, Lucerne, Missionsgesellschaft Bethlehem Immensee SMB.
