= Bertha Hardegger =

Swiss missionary doctor in Basutoland (1903–1979)

- Born: 6 June 1903; Oberegg
- Died: 3 November 1979 (aged 76); Thalwil
- Occupation: Missionary doctor
- Awards: Member of the Order of the British Empire (1950); Pro Ecclesia et Pontifice (1951); For Dedicated Service to Africa medal, Royal African Society (1962)

Bertha Hardegger (6 June 1903 – 3 November 1979) was a Swiss missionary doctor and the founder of several hospitals in Basutoland (present-day Lesotho).

== Early life and education ==
The eldest of eight siblings, Hardegger was the daughter of the doctor Jakob Hardegger and Katarina Bertha, née Locher, and grew up in Bütschwil. After attending the secondary school of the Dominican convent of Saint Catherine in Wil, she obtained her matura in 1923 at the cantonal girls' lycée in Fribourg. She studied medicine at the universities of Montpellier, Vienna, and Basel, where she took her doctorate in 1930. She then briefly took over her father's practice before pursuing further training at the Institute of Missionary Medicine in Würzburg from 1933 to 1935, the year she also passed the state medical examination in Dublin. She never married and had no children.

== Mission in Basutoland ==
In 1936, together with Maria Kunz, Hardegger was one of the first Swiss Catholic women doctors to leave for a mission outside Europe. Assigned to the mountainous region of Paray, in the center of the British colony of Basutoland, she opened a hospital in Thaba-Tseka in 1938. She later founded two further hospitals, at Seboche in 1957 and at Lejone in 1963.

Despite the patriarchal structure of the Christian missionary societies and the control they exercised, Hardegger, as a highly qualified European, benefited in the colonial context—far from the conservative gender norms that prevailed in Switzerland, including in medicine and the medical profession—from power relations based on racism. To defend her interests, she maintained close and strategic relations with other women missionary doctors and with influential supporters, such as the Swiss Alois Häne, bishop of Gwelo (Gweru, Zimbabwe). She was reluctant about decolonization and, when Lesotho gained its independence in 1966, criticized the new political order.

== Return to Switzerland and reception ==
In 1970, Hardegger returned to Switzerland for health reasons. Running a practice in Thalwil, she raised funds to support the medical mission in Lesotho through film screenings, lectures, and press articles. Highly regarded in medical and missionary circles, she passed objects from indigenous populations of Lesotho on to museums in eastern Switzerland. In 1950 she was appointed a Member of the Order of the British Empire by King George VI. The following year she received the Pro Ecclesia et Pontifice cross from the hands of Pope Pius XII, and in 1962 she was decorated with the bronze For Dedicated Service to Africa medal of the Royal African Society.

A major actor in the diffusion and consolidation of colonial knowledge in Switzerland through her promotional campaigns, Hardegger placed herself in a position of superiority vis-à-vis the local populations of Lesotho. In Swiss public opinion she was presented as the "mother of the Basuto" and her achievements were compared to those of Albert Schweitzer. Her figure crystallized a specific representation of woman, shaped by colonialism: piety, a spirit of sacrifice, vitality, and a femininity centered on "spiritual motherhood", combined with bravery and a racialized sense of superiority.

== Works ==
- Verbreitung des Kropfes bei den Schulkindern von Basel und Riehen im Jahre 1930, 1930.

== Bibliography ==
- J. P. Specker, ed., Bertha Hardegger, Mutter der Basuto. Als weisse Ärztin in Schwarzafrika, 1987.
- V. Niedermann, "Bertha Hardegger. Der weisse 'doctor' ist eine Frau!", in M. Widmer and H. Witzig, eds., Blütenweiss bis rabenschwarz. St. Galler Frauen – 200 Porträts, 2003, p. 170.
- R. Charumbira, "Becoming imperial: A Swiss woman's shifting identity in British Southern Africa", in P. Purtschert and H. Fischer-Tiné, eds., Colonial Switzerland. Rethinking Colonialism from the Margins, 2015, pp. 157–178.
- P. Holenstein Weidmann, "Die grosse Unbekannte aus Bütschwil: Missionsärztin Bertha Hardegger", in Toggenburger Jahrbuch, 2024, pp. 117–140.
- S. Rees, Missionary Architectures of Difference. Negotiating "Race", Gender, and Sexuality between Switzerland and Colonial Zimbabwe (1938–1965), doctoral thesis, University of Fribourg, 2024.

=== Archives ===
- Kooperative Speicherbibliothek, Büron, Tagebuch Bertha Hardegger, Romero Mc 377 (extract 1966–1970, photocopy of a transcription).
- Kulturmuseum St. Gallen, St. Gallen, archives.
