= Patrick Ngwenya =

Zimbabwean Catholic prelate (born 1967)

The Most Reverend Patrick Ngwenya
- Bishop of Chinhoyi, Zimbabwe
- Church: Catholic Church
- Archdiocese: Roman Catholic Archdiocese of Harare
- See: Diocese of Chinhoyi
- Appointed: 11 April 2026
- Predecessor: Raymond Tapiwa Mupandasekwa (30 December 2017 - 15 September 2023)
- Successor: Incumbent

Orders
- Ordination: 25 August 2007
- Consecration: 4 July 2026 by Robert Christopher Ndlovu

Personal details
- Born: Patrick Ngwenya; 1 February 1967 (age 59) Mutare, Diocese of Mutare, Manicaland, Zimbabwe
- Motto: Ministrare et non ministrari (Not to be served, but to serve)

Styles of Patrick Ngwenya
- Reference style: His Grace; The Most Reverend
- Spoken style: Your Grace
- Religious style: Bishop

Patrick Ngwenya (born 1 February 1967) is a Zimbabwean Catholic prelate who was appointed Bishop of the Roman Catholic Diocese of Chinhoyi, Zimbabwe on 11 April 2026. Before that, from 25 August 2007 until 11 April 2026, he served as a priest of the Roman Catholic Archdiocese of Harare, Zimbabwe. He was appointed bishop by Pope Leo XIV. His episcopal consecration took place in Chinhoyi on 4 July 2026.

== Background and education ==
He was born on 1 February 1967, in Mutare, in the Diocese of Mutare, Manicaland Province, Zimbabwe. He studied at the University of Zimbabwe, graduating with a degree in education. He also holds a diploma in Marketing from the Business Career Development College of the London Chamber of Commerce and Industry. Later, he studied at the Sacred Heart Regional Preparatory Seminary in Mazowe, in the Archdiocese of Harare. He studied philosophy at the Saint Augustine Philosophical Seminary in the Diocese of Bulawayo. He then completed his studies in theology at the Pontifical University of Saint Thomas Aquinas, in Rome, Italy.

== Priest ==
He was ordained a priest for the Archdiocese of Harare, on 25 August 2007. He served as a priest until 11 April 2026. While a priest, he served in various roles and locations including:

- Vicar of Saint Francis of Assisi Parish in Chegutu, Harare from 2007 until 2008.
- Parish priest and Superior of All Souls Mission in Mutoko, Harare from 2008 until 2012.
- Vicar for the Eastern Deanery from 2010 until 2012.
- Member of the College of Consultors from 2010 until 2022.
- Vicar of Saint Matia Kalemba Parish in Norton, Harare from 2012 until 2013.
- Studies leading to the award of a Diploma in Executive Secretarial Studies, from the London Chamber of Commerce and Industry from 2013 until 2014.
- Studies leading to the award of a Diploma in Executive Secretarial Studies from Speciss College, Harare from 2013 until 2014.
- Vicar and Pastoral Assistant at Saint Peter Canisius Parish in Marlborough, Harare from 2013 until 2014.
- Secretary to the Archbishop of Harare from 2013 until 2022.
- President of the Ruvarashe Trust, Catholic Center for Disabled People in the Makumbi Mission from 2013 until 2022.
- Studies at the John Paul II Pontifical Theological Institute for Marriage and Family Sciences, in Kerala, India leading to the award of a licentiate in Marriage and Family Life from 2022 until 2024.
- Director of the marriage office of the Archdiocese of Harare from 2008 until 2026.
- Assistant secretary to the Archbishop of Harare from 2012 until 2026.
- Coordinator of the family apostolate of the Archdiocese of Harare from 2024 until 2026.
- Parish priest of Saint Francis Xavier Church, Braeside, Harare from 2025 until 2026.

== Bishop ==
On 11 April 2026, Pope Leo XIV appointed him bishop of the Diocese of Chinhoyi, Zimbabwe. He succeeded Bishop Raymond Tapiwa Mupandasekwa, who served as the local ordinary at Chinhoyi from 30 December 2017 until 15 September 2023. Bishop Patrick Ngwenya received his episcopal consecration at Chinhoyi on 4 July 2026. The Principal Consecrator was Robert Christopher Ndlovu, Archbishop of Harare who was assisted by Raymond Tapiwa Mupandasekwa, Bishop of Masvingo and Janusz Stanisław Urbańczyk, Titular Archbishop of Voli.

== See also ==
- Roman Catholicism in Zimbabwe

== Succession table ==
Catholic Church titles
Preceded by Raymond Tapiwa Mupandasekwa (30 December 2017 - 15 September 2023)	Bishop of Chinhoyi (since 11 April 2026)	Succeeded by (Incumbent)
