= Xavier Johnsai Munyongani =

Zimbabwean Roman Catholic prelate (1950-2017)

The Most Reverend Xavier Johnsai Munyongani
- Bishop of Gweru, Zimbabwe (Deceased)
- Church: Catholic Church
- Archdiocese: Roman Catholic Archdiocese of Harare
- See: Gweru
- Appointed: 15 June 2013
- Installed: 14 September 2013
- Term ended: 15 October 2017
- Predecessor: Martin Munyanyi
- Successor: Rudolf Nyandoro

Orders
- Ordination: 20 August 1977 by Tobias Wunganayi Chiginya
- Consecration: 14 September 2013 by Michael Dixon Bhasera
- Rank: Bishop

Personal details
- Born: Xavier Johnsai Munyongani; January 1, 1950; Mutero Mission, Gutu District, Diocese of Masvingo, Masvingo Province, Zimbabwe
- Died: 15 October 2017 (aged 67)

Styles of Xavier Johnsai Munyongani
- Reference style: Your Lordship; The Most Reverend
- Spoken style: His Lordship
- Religious style: Bishop

Xavier Johnsai Munyongani (1 January 1950 - 15 October 2017) was a Zimbabwean Roman Catholic prelate who served as Bishop of the Roman Catholic Diocese of Gweru in Zimbabwe from June 2013 until his death in October 2017. He was appointed bishop on 15 June 2013 by Pope Francis. He was installed at Gweru in the Diocese of Gweru on 14 September 2013. He died in office on 15 October 2017 at the age of 67 years.

== Early life and education ==
He was born on 1 January 1950 at Mutero Mission in Gutu District in the Diocese of Masvingo, Masvingo Province in the southern part of Zimbabwe. He was the 8th born out of the 10 children in his family. He attended primary schools in Gutu District. He then entered the Chikwingwizha Minor Seminary in Gweru Catholic Diocese where he attended secondary school between 1967 and 1970. He was then admitted to Chishawasha Major Seminary near Harare, where he studied both Philosophy and Theology from 1971 until 1977.

== Priest ==
On 20 August 1977 he was ordained a priest for the diocese of Gweru, by Bishop Tobias Wunganayi Chiginya, Bishop of Gweru. He was incardinated a priest of Masvingo Diocese, Zimbabwe on 9 February 1999. In 2007 he was appointed as the Chaplain of the Zimbabwean Catholics in England and Wales, by the Zimbabwe Catholic Bishops' Conference (ZCBC). He took up that post in June 2008. In 2010, Pope Benedict XVI conferred upon him the title of Monsignor.

== Bishop ==
Pope Francis appointed him Bishop of the Roman Catholic Diocese of Gweru on 15 June 2013. He was consecrated and installed at Gweru Mkoba Stadium, in Gweru, in the Diocese of Gweru on 14 September 2013. The Principal Consecrator was Bishop Michael Dixon Bhasera, Bishop of Masvingo assisted by Archbishop Robert Christopher Ndlovu, Archbishop of Harare and Bishop Martin Munyanyi, Bishop Emeritus of Gweru. In 2015 Bishop Munyongani represented the ZCBC at the Synod of Bishops held at the Vatican from the 4th to the 25th October 2015 and presided by Pope Francis.

In 2017 Bishop Xavier Johnsai Munyongani was diagnosed with cancer. On 15 October 2017 that cancer killed him while hospitalized at the Avenues Clinic, in the city of Harare, Zimbabwe. He died three months shy of his 68th birthday.

== See also ==
- Catholic Church in Zimbabwe

== Succession table ==
Catholic Church titles
Preceded by Martin Munyanyi (11 May 2006 - 28 April 2012)	Bishop of Gweru (15 June 2013 - 15 October 2017)	Succeeded by Rudolf Nyandoro (since 11 September 2020)
