= Dieter Bernd Scholz =

German Roman Catholic prelate (born 1939)

The Most Reverend Dieter Bernd Scholz
- Bishop Emeritus of Chinhoyi, Zimbabwe
- Church: Catholic Church
- Archdiocese: Roman Catholic Archdiocese of Harare
- See: Roman Catholic Diocese of Chinhoyi
- Appointed: 6 April 2006
- Installed: 2 September 2006
- Term ended: 17 February 2016
- Predecessor: Helmut Reckter
- Successor: Raymond Tapiwa Mupandasekwa

Orders
- Ordination: 13 July 1969
- Consecration: 2 September 2006 by Robert Christopher Ndlovu
- Rank: Bishop

Personal details
- Born: Dieter Bernd Scholz; 2 June 1938 (age 88) Berlin, Germany

Styles of Dieter Bernd Scholz
- Reference style: Your Lordship; The Most Reverend
- Spoken style: His Lordship
- Religious style: Bishop

Dieter Bernd Scholz S.J. (born 2 June 1938) is a German Roman Catholic prelate who was the Bishop of the Roman Catholic Diocese of Chinhoyi, Zimbabwe from 2006 until 2016. He was appointed bishop by Pope Benedict XVI on 6 April 2006. He was consecrated and installed there on 2 September 2006. He retired as bishop on 17 February 2016. He lives on as Bishop Emeritus of Chinhoyi, Zimbabwe.

== Background and priesthood ==
He was born on 2 June 1938 in Berlin, Germany. He professed to be a member of the Order of the Society of Jesus on 15 April 1958. He was ordained a priest of the same society on 13 July 1969 at the age of 31 years.

== As bishop ==
On 6 April 2006, Pope Benedict XVI appointed Reverend Father Dieter Bernd Scholz S.J. as Bishop of the Roman Catholic Diocese of Chinhoyi in Zimbabwe. He was consecrated and installed at Chinhoyi, in the Diocese of Chinhoyi on 2 September 2006. The Principal Consecrator was Archbishop Robert Christopher Ndlovu, Archbishop of Harare assisted by Archbishop Edward Joseph Adams, Titular Archbishop of Scala and Archbishop Pius Alick Mvundla Ncube, Archbishop of Bulawayo.

On 17 February 2016 Pope Francis accepted the resignation from the pastoral care of the Roman Catholic Diocese of Chinhoyi, Zimbabwe, presented by His Excellency Monsignor Dieter Bernd Scholz S.J. The Holy Father appointed His Excellency Monsignor Robert Christopher Ndlovu, Archbishop of Harare as Apostolic Administrator, to oversee the diocese until a suitable bishop was appointed.

== See also ==
- Catholic Church in Zimbabwe

== Succession table ==
Catholic Church titles
Preceded by Helmut Reckter (22 February 1974 - 10 March 2004)	Bishop of Chinhoyi (6 April 2006 - 17 February 2016)	Succeeded by Raymond Tapiwa Mupandasekwa (30 December 2017 - 15 September 2023)
