= Janice McLaughlin =

American Catholic nun and anti-apartheid activist (1942–2021)

Janice McLaughlin M.M.
- Born: February 13, 1942; Pittsburgh, Pennsylvania, U.S.
- Died: March 7, 2021 (aged 79); Ossining, New York, U.S.
- Education: College of Saint Mary of the Springs; Marquette University; University of Zimbabwe
- Occupations: Maryknoll Missionary Sister, activist, missionary

Janice McLaughlin MM (February 13, 1942 – March 7, 2021) was an American Catholic nun, missionary, and human rights activist. While working as the press secretary for the Catholic Commission for Justice and Peace in the 1970s, she was imprisoned by the white minority government in Rhodesia for exposing atrocities and human rights violations committed against the country's black citizens. She was placed in solitary confinement and, after intervention from the Vatican and the United States federal government, she was deported to the United States. She returned two years later to the newly established country of Zimbabwe to create an educational system, at the request of Prime Minister Robert Mugabe. In her later years she served as the president of the Maryknoll Sisters of St. Dominic in New York and worked as an anti-human trafficking activist.

== Early life ==
McLaughlin was born on February 13, 1942, in Pittsburgh, Pennsylvania, to Paul McLaughlin and Mary Schaub. She graduated from St. Lawrence High School in 1960 and attended the College of Saint Mary of the Springs in Columbus, Ohio for one year before entering religious life with the Maryknoll Sisters of St. Dominic in Ossining, New York. The order, founded in 1912, was the first American congregation of Roman Catholic nuns dedicated to overseas missions. She made her first progression of vows on June 24, 1964, in New York and her final profession on June 24, 1972, in Kitale, Kenya.

In 1969 she graduated magna cum laude from Marquette University with a Bachelor of Arts degree in theology, anthropology, and sociology.

== Religious career and mission work ==
McLaughlin worked as a missionary in Africa for almost forty years, mainly in Rhodesia, where she arrived in 1977. She arrived during the Rhodesian Bush War, when black nationalists were attempting to overthrow the white minority apartheid government led by Prime Minister Ian Smith. McLaughlin worked as a communications coordinator for the Catholic Church in Kenya, where she trained journalists and broadcasters, established diocesan newspapers, produced radio and television programs, and drafted public statements for bishops. She was later appointed the press secretary for the Catholic Commission for Justice and Peace in Zimbabwe, a non-governmental organization made up of lay people and clergy that opposed the apartheid government. As press secretary, she helped expose human rights abuses and atrocities committed across the country including systemic torture of black people in rural areas, the assassinations of Catholic clergy, and the murders of innocent civilians. She wrote about the forced resettlement of nearly 600,000 black citizens who had been held in guarded, overcrowded camps lacking proper sanitation and food. Three months after her arrival in Rhodesia, she was arrested by the government and charged with being a Marxist and a terrorist sympathizer. She was locked in solitary confinement for eighteen days and faced a penalty of seven years in prison, but was deported after the United States intervened on her behalf. McLaughlin's writings about human rights violations committed by the white government of Rhodesia were published in obscure journals and papers, but her imprisonment led to international media attention. The United States State Department, the United Nations, and the Vatican spoke out on her behalf. On the day of her deportation, she was greeted by 50 black and white Rhodesians, many of them Catholic priests and religious sisters, at the airport. They reportedly cheered for her and sang the black nationalist anthem Ishe Komborera Africa. Upon her return to the United States, McLaughlin told a reporter from The New York Times that she was not a Marxist but she did support the Zimbabwe People's Revolutionary Army and the Zimbabwe African National Liberation Army, stating, "I think it's come to the point where it's impossible to bring about change without the war, and I support change."

After her deportation, she worked with the Washington Office on Africa. In 1979 she became the projects officer for the Zimbabwe Project, an initiative set up by Catholic donors to assist refugees from the civil war in Rhodesia. Two years after her deportation, McLaughlin returned to Africa, where she helped Rhodesian exiles and refugees in Mozambique. After the white Rhodesian government ceded power to black Zimbabweans in 1980, she returned to Harare to celebrate the installation of Robert Mugabe as the first Prime Minister of Zimbabwe. Mugabe asked for McLaughlin's help rebuilding the nation's educational system, to which she agreed. Along with education reform, she established nine schools for former refugees and war veterans. She co-wrote a book about the educational experiment called Education with Production in Zimbabwe: the Story of ZIMFEP. When Mugabe was removed from power, she criticized his leadership, stating "A man who had raised such high hopes for peace, reconciliation, and development in 1980 had instead left a legacy of violence, poverty, corruption, hunger, and hopelessness."

In 1991, McLaughlin returned to the Maryknoll community in New York to work as the communications coordinator. Six years later, she returned to Zimbabwe and worked as a training coordinator for Silveira House, a Jesuit-run training and development education center for the poor. She continued to live in Zimbabwe until 2009, where she served as the chairwoman of the African Forum for Catholic Social Teaching and as the chairwoman of the Counseling Service Unit. She co-authored an advocacy training manual used throughout Zimbabwe to train local communities to lobby for policy changes in government and, in 2009, published the book Ostriches, Dung Beetles, and other Spiritual Master: A Book of Wisdom from the Wild.

She was elected as president of the Maryknoll Sisters in 2009 and served in that capacity for six years. After her term as president ended, she returned to Zimbabwe and worked in community development and in efforts to stop human trafficking. She also worked with the Catholic University of Zimbabwe as a research advisor and conference coordinator.

== Personal life and death ==
In 1992 McLaughlin earned a master's degree and a doctorate in religious studies from the University of Zimbabwe. Her thesis, titled On the Frontline, Rural Catholic Missions and Zimbabwe's Liberation War, was published in 1995.

She was conferred an Honorary Doctor of Religious Studies degree by Marquette University on May 23, 2010. On May 18, 2014, she was conferred with an Honorary Doctor of Humane Letters by Albertus Magnus College in New Haven, Connecticut.

McLaughlin died on March 7, 2021, at the motherhouse of the Maryknoll Sisters of St. Dominic in Ossining, New York. A funeral mass was livestreamed, due to the COVID-19 pandemic in the United States, on March 12, 2021, from the Annunciation Chapel at the Maryknoll Sisters Center. McLaughlin donated her body to scientific research.

Zimbabwean President Emmerson Mnangagwa eulogized her after her death, stating that she "helped give the liberation struggle an enhanced international voice and reach." The Zimbabwe National Liberation War Veterans Association announced it would urge President Mnangagwa to declare McLaughlin a "national heroine".
