= Alexio =

Alexio may refer to:

- Dennis Alexio, American kickboxer and actor
- Alexio Churu Muchabaiwa, Zimbabwean Catholic prelate
- Alexio Young, American long distance runner
