= Paul Horan =

Irish Roman Catholic prelate (born 1962)

The Most Reverend Paul Horan
- Bishop of Mutare, Zimbabwe
- Church: Catholic Church
- Archdiocese: Roman Catholic Archdiocese of Harare
- See: Mutare
- Appointed: 28 May 2016
- Installed: 27 August 2016
- Predecessor: Alexio Churu Muchabaiwa
- Successor: Incumbent

Orders
- Ordination: 7 June 1997
- Consecration: 27 August 2016 by Robert Christopher Ndlovu
- Rank: Bishop

Personal details
- Born: Paul Horan; 17 October 1962 (age 63) Drangan, County Tipperary, Ireland

Styles of Paul Horan
- Reference style: Your Lordship; The Most Reverend
- Spoken style: His Lordship
- Religious style: Bishop

Paul Horan, O. Carm. (born 17 October 1962) is an Irish Roman Catholic prelate who is the Bishop of the Roman Catholic Diocese of Mutare, Zimbabwe since 2016. He was appointed bishop by Pope Francis on 28 May 2016. He was consecrated and installed there on 28 August 2016.

== Background and education ==
He was born on 17 October 1962, at Drangan, County Tipperary, in Ireland. He attended the Convent of Mercy Primary School in Drangan. For his secondary school education, he attended the Presentation Sisters Secondary School in Ballingarry.

He qualified as an accountant and is a member of the Association of Chartered Certified Accountants (ACCA) and "worked in Ireland and London". He studied at and graduated from the Milltown Institute of Theology and Philosophy with a Bachelor's degree in Philosophy and a Bachelor of Divinity degree. He also holds a Master of Arts degree in Theology obtained from the Washington Theological Union in the United States, awarded in May 2001.

== Priest ==
In 1989, Father Paul Horan was received into the Order of the Brothers of the Blessed Virgin Mary of Mount Carmel (Carmelites) while a seminarian at the Novitiate Seminary at Kinsale. He took his preliminary vows as a Carmelite on 1 September 1990. He then took his perpetual vows as a Carmelite on 15 October 1995. He was ordained a priest of the Carmelite Order on 7 June 1997.

As a priest, he served in various roles in different locations including:

- Teacher at both primary and secondary levels at Terenure College, Ireland.
- Head chaplain and head of the Province's Vocations Team.
- Director of Pre-Novices, Director of Novices, School Manager at Kriste Mambo High School, Zimbabwe since September 2001.
- Pastoral caretaker at St. Kilian's Mission, Makoni, Zimbabwe.
- Elected in 2009 and 2012 as a member of the Zimbabwean Carmelite Commissary Council.
- Appointed by the Carmelite General Council to the International Commission for Carmelite Schools and Youth.
- Prior of the new Carmelite Community in Prophet Elijah Priory, Nyazura, Rusape
- Father Paul Horan "was highly instrumental in getting the first Carmelite Nuns to Zimbabwe who arrived there from the Monastery of Our Lady of Mount Carmel, in Machakos, Kenya in February 2015".

== As bishop ==
On 28 May 2016, Pope Francis appointed Reverend Father Paul Horan, O. Carm. as Bishop of the Roman Catholic Diocese of Mutare in Zimbabwe. He was consecrated and installed at Marymount Teachers' College, Mutare, in the Diocese of Mutare on 27 August 2016. The Principal Consecrator was Archbishop Robert Christopher Ndlovu, Archbishop of Harare assisted by Bishop Alexio Churu Muchabaiwa, Bishop Emeritus of Mutare and Archbishop Marek Zalewski, Titular Archbishop of Africa.

== See also ==
- Catholic Church in Zimbabwe

== Succession table ==
Catholic Church titles
Preceded by Alexio Churu Muchabaiwa (5 November 1981 - 28 May 2016)	Bishop of Mutare (since 28 May 2016)	Succeeded by Incumbent
