= Harare Central =

- National Assembly constituency for the Parliament of Zimbabwe
- District: Harare
- Province: Harare
- Electorate: 39,127 (2023)

Current constituency
- Number of members: 1
- Party: Citizens Coalition for Change
- Member: Lovemore Jimu

Harare Central is a constituency represented in the National Assembly of the Parliament of Zimbabwe. It is located in the central area of Harare, the capital of Zimbabwe. Like all Zimbabwean constituencies, Harare Central elects one Member of Parliament (MP) by the first-past-the-post electoral system. The seat has been represented by MP Lovemore Jimu since the 2023 general election.

== History ==
On 23 June 2020, Murisi Zwizwai was recalled as MP for Harare Central amid factional disputes within the Movement for Democratic Change Alliance. He was reelected to his seat in a 26 March 2022 by-election, this time representing the newly-formed Citizens Coalition for Change. Murisi Zwizwai died in Harare in June 2024, leaving his position vacant.

== Members ==
Election	Member	Election
1995	Florence Chitauro	ZANU–PF
2000	Mike Auret	MDC
2003 by-election	Murisi Zwizwai	MDC
2005	Murisi Zwizwai	MDC
2008	Murisi Zwizwai	MDC–T
2013	Murisi Zwizwai	MDC–T
2018	Murisi Zwizwai	MDC Alliance
2022 by-election	Murisi Zwizwai	CCC
2023	Lovemore Jimu	CCC

== Election results ==
2022 by-election: Harare Central
Candidate	Party	Votes	%	+/–
Murisi Zwizwai	CCC	3,332	69.49	New
Loice Magweba	ZANU–PF	1,375	28.68	-0.18
Marara Norest Chiureki	MDC Alliance	65	1.36	-54.37
Linda Masarira	Labour, Economists and African Democrats	20	0.42	New
Rukanda Henry Gwinyai	MA'AT Zimbabwe	3	0.06	New
Total		4,795	100.00	–
Majority		1,957	40.81	+13.94
CCC gain from MDC Alliance				

== See also ==
- List of Zimbabwean parliamentary constituencies
