= Catholic Commission for Justice and Peace in Zimbabwe =

The Catholic Commission for Justice and Peace in Zimbabwe (CCJPZ) is a non-governmental organization whose aim is to highlight the plight of the Zimbabwean people and assist in cases of human rights abuse.

The CCJPZ was established in 1972 as the Catholic Commission for Justice and Peace in Rhodesia. The commission changed its name when Rhodesia became Zimbabwe after independence in 1980 and has offices in Harare, Bulawayo, Binga village, and Mutare, along with the presence of a "Justice and Peace committee in each diocese". Its stated duties are: to inform people's consciences; to make people aware of their rights and duties as citizens; to encourage love, understanding and harmony through the promotion of the Church's social teaching; to investigate allegations of injustice which it considers to merit attention, and to take appropriate action; to keep in contact with other organisations with similar aims and objectives and; to advise the Bishop's Conference on the human rights situation pertaining from time to time.

== The Commission in Rhodesia, 1972-1980 ==
=== Overview ===
The Catholic Commission for Justice and Peace in Rhodesia (CCJPR) during the Second Chimurenga was the primary organisation enacting justice and defending human rights. For the organisation, injustice in Rhodesia was the social, economic, and political discrimination that black Zimbabweans faced.

The Rhodesian Catholic Bishop’s Conference (RCBC) set up the CCJPR in response to Pope Paul VI’s call, ‘if you want peace, work for justice’. The Commission were officially approved by the Rhodesia Catholic Bishops’ Conference (RCBC) on the third of March 1972. Set out in a pamphlet called 20 Questions and Answers on the Commission of Justice and Peace in Rhodesia, the aim of the Commission was to be a working body against racial injustice and violence in Rhodesia. The CCJPR rejected violence of all forms – physical, psychological, and institutional – either to maintain the status quo (the Rhodesian Front and Security Forces) or to bring about change (ZANLA/ZIPRA and freedom fighters).

=== Aims ===
The Commission aimed to:

- Raise awareness of the social teachings of the Church.
- Highlight the contradictions between these social teachings and inequality and discrimination in Rhodesia.
- Publicise information on current social issues and concerns, including injust legislation.
- Take allegations of injustice seriously, and to research and investigate them.
- Protect human rights by acting on these allegations, as much as was within the power of the Commission.
- Protect people, both lay and religious, Christian or not.

=== Publications, 1973-1978 ===
The unique standing of the Catholic Church allowed the CCJPR to remain informed of the actions of freedom fighters and Security Forces in Rhodesia during the Second Chimurenga. Catholic missionaries were on the frontlines and so were well positioned to investigate and inform the CCJPR of human rights abuses committed by the Security Forces. In turn, the CCJPR published these cases in a series of dossiers.

==== Legal Guides ====
===== The Rights and Duties of a Citizen when Arrested (1973) =====
A booklet published in English, Shona, and Sindebele. It explained the laws around arrests in easily understandable terms. Covered procedures of arrest, investigation, statement making, police searches, appearing as witnesses, and blood tests. Initially, the CCJPR printed 30,000 copies, distributed to schools and police stations for educational purposes.

===== The Rights and Duties of a Citizen when on Trial (1974) =====
A follow up booklet to The Rights and Duties of a Citizen when Arrested. Published in English, Shona, and Sindebele, this booklet explained the procedures of trial and the rights of citizens’ when facing trial. It also outlined the powers of judges and prosecutors in the court of law.

==== Documentation of Colonial Atrocities ====
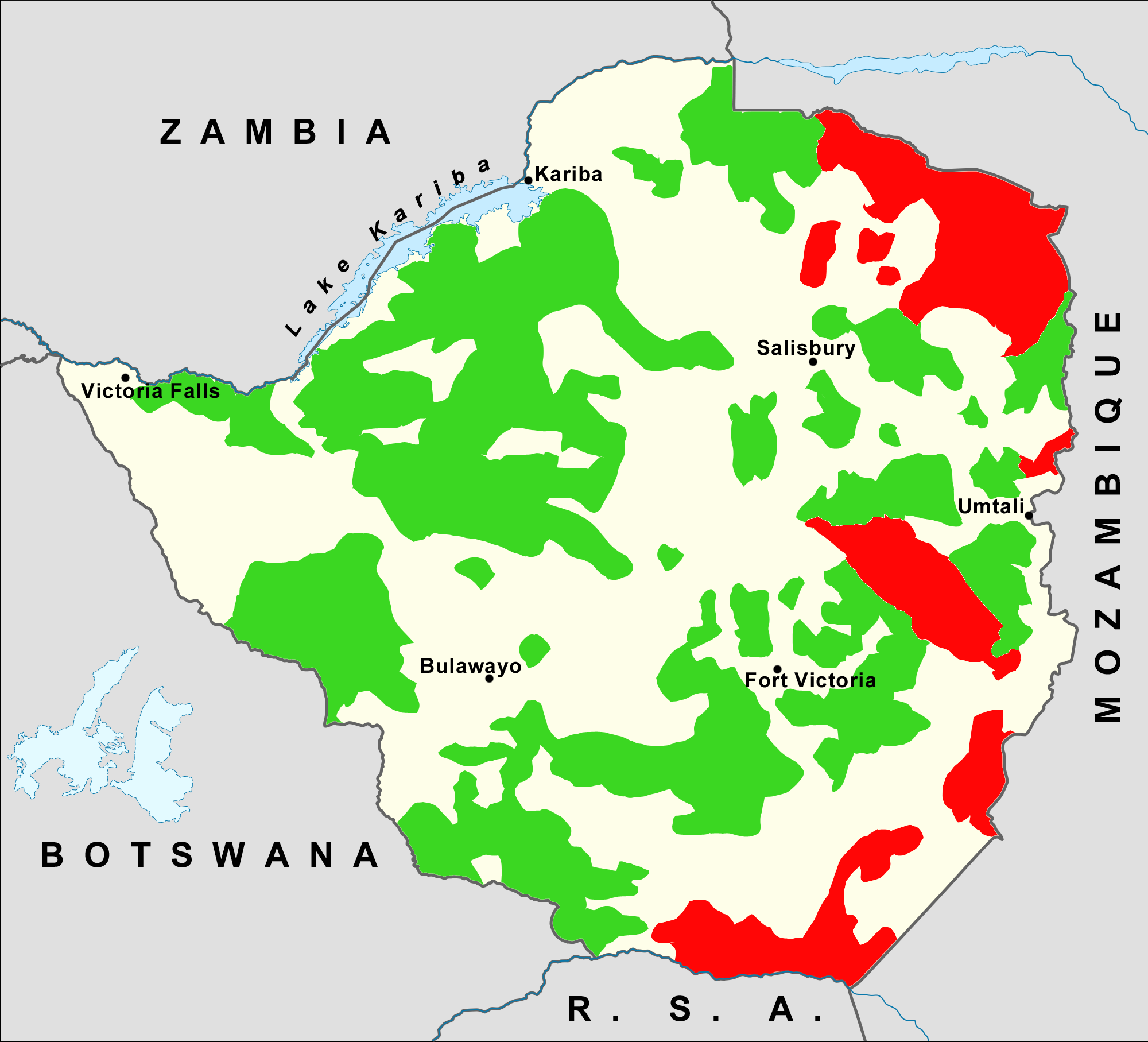
Protected Villages in Rhodesia, both existing and planned by 1978. Green represents areas where local populations were in Protected Villages, and red where they were not.

In 1975, the Rhodesian Front passed the Indemnity and Compensation Act which effectively prevented the hearing and judgement of cases against anyone who was believed to have acted in ‘good faith’ with the intent of suppressing terrorism. As there was no longer a legal precedent for bringing cases of colonial violence to court, the CCJPR instead turned to publishing dossiers. These dossiers, published in association with the Catholic Institute for International Relations (CIIR), were incredibly important sources documenting the violence inflicted on black Zimbabweans. Including specific cases, photographs, and detailed reports, the CCJPR disseminated well-substantiated cases to Rhodesian and international audiences, breaking the silence around human rights violations.

===== The Man in the Middle (1975) =====
In December 1972, ZANLA began its military struggle, and local black Zimbabweans were viewed by the Security Forces as accessories to these attacks. From March 1973, the Commission received reports of security force brutality towards villagers, especially as the Security Forces increasingly viewed all black Zimbabweans as the enemy. The CCJPR investigated and documented over thirty-seven allegations, some of which were published in a dossier entitled The Man in the Middle. Effectively a “going public” of research into colonial violence, it focused on rural African citizens caught in-between freedom fighters and Security Forces. The dossier also contained a detailed account of ‘protected villages’, which involved the forcible removal of Africans into camps where they faced inhumane conditions.

===== Civil War in Rhodesia (1976) =====
Published in October 1976, both in Rhodesia and in London, Civil War in Rhodesia documented further cases of torture, abduction and death in the Security Forces’ counter-insurgency campaign. Although acting as a voice for black Zimbabweans, the Commission stated in this dossier that its intention was to inform, not to accuse. Over 2500 copies of Civil War in Rhodesia were distributed globally.

===== Rhodesia: the Propaganda War (1977) =====
Published independently by the CIIR, it compiled “Fact Papers” produced by the CCJP. These “Fact Papers”, not intended for publication, included detailed accounts of civilian deaths, government propaganda, rural collapse, villagisation projects, torture, and secret hangings. The information in these reports was collected from Commission accounts, governmental departments, and sometimes the army itself. In the face of limited and controlled media coverage from Rhodesia, the CIIR published the dossier as a further attempt to broadcast the truth of the war in Rhodesia. Aimed at international audiences, it discussed the use of propaganda by the Rhodesian Front. The dossier included reproductions of Rhodesian Front propaganda, alongside images of black Zimbabweans, injured and brutalised at the hands of the Security Forces.

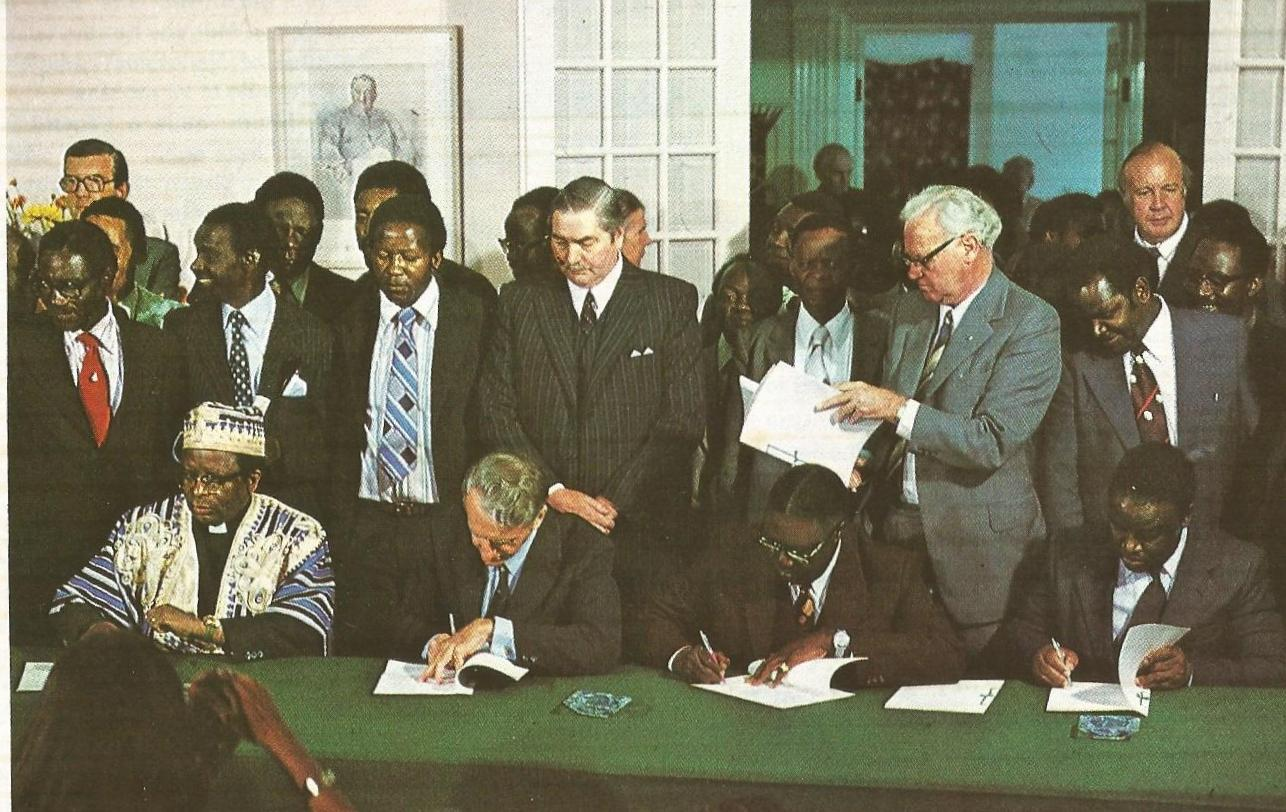
Signing of the Internal Settlement agreement by Ian Smith, Bishop Abel Muzorewa, Ndabaningi Sithole and Senator Chief Jeremiah Chirau in 1978.

===== An Analysis of the Salisbury Agreement (1978) =====
The Commission wrote a dossier that analysed the Salisbury Agreement (signed by all four internal political parties, it outlined the political future of the country). It aimed to provide an understanding of the agreement and make the implications digestible for the public. The CCJPR also included an analysis of the agreement, including critiques. The Commission published 5000 copies, and the CIIR published an international booklet, Rhodesia after the Internal Settlement, in conjunction with the CCJPR.

== Outreach ==
In March 1997, the Catholic Commission for Justice and Peace in Zimbabwe compiled the report on the situation in Matabeleland and the Midlands during the period of 1980-1988 titled Breaking the Silence, Building True Peace. The report was based on the human rights abuses orchestrated by Prime Minister Robert Mugabe's North Korean-trained Zimbabwean Fifth Brigade, which was known within the nation as the Gukurahundi.The publication of the report was possible because Zimbabwe had been enjoying a period of stability and national unity since the Unity Accord of 1987.

As one of the few human rights organisations in Zimbabwe, CCJPZ has made significant contributions to the documentation of the injustices and suffering of the Zimbabwean people during the Rhodesian Bush War and Gukurahundi. In the late nineties the Commission distributed impartial literature on the right to vote which led to a high voter turnout for the 2000 parliamentary elections.

== Recording History ==
The CCJPZ has recorded crucial chapters of Zimbabwe's history in reports and publications since before independence in 1980. These records encompass the Rhodesian Bush War, Gukurahundi, pre-election and post election violence since independence.

== Key Members ==
=== Presidents ===
- Bishop Aloysius Haene SMB (1972-1974)
- Bishop Donal Lamont O.Carm. (1974-1977)
- Bishop Helmut Reckter SJ (1977-1981)

=== Directors ===
- Mr C. Mhondoro (1981-1982)
- Ms Dorita Field (1983-1984)
- Mr C. Maveneka (1984-1986)
- Nicholas Ndebele (1986-1991)
- Mike Auret (1992-1999)
- A.M. Chaumba

=== Chairpersons ===
- Alexander Graham (1972-1974)
- Patrick Doherty 91972-1977)
- Sylvester Maruza (1972-1978)
- Etherton Mpisaugna (1974-1977)
- Br Fidelis Mukonori SJ (1974-1981)
- John Deary (1972-1981)
- Mike Auret (1981-1990)
- Peter Peel (1990-1992)
- Charles Dube (1992-2000)
- Aliyeli Lungu (-2016)
- Yvonne Winfildah Takawira-Matwaya (2016–Present)

=== Vice-Chairpersons ===
- Chris Bishop (1972-1976)
- Timothy McLoughlin (1972-1976)
- Michael Leslie Leach (1972-1975)
- Fr Dieter Scholtz SJ (1974-1979)
- Stan Made (1979-1981)

== Affiliations ==
CCJPZ is a Commission of the Zimbabwe Catholic Bishops' Conference with an affiliation to the Pontifical Council for Justice and Peace in Rome and has active contact with Commissions in other countries.

== Archival Information ==
- Reaching for Justice, a history of the CCJP (Mambo Press, 1992)
- Caught in The Crossfire (Video detailing the plight of the Zimbabwean people in the Liberation War of the 1970s)
- Catholic Institute for International Relations, Catholic Commission for Justice and Peace in Rhodesia. Rhodesia After the Internal Settlement, 1978
