= Raymond Tapiwa Mupandasekwa =

Zimbabwean Catholic prelate (born 1970)

The Most Reverend Raymond Tapiwa Mupandasekwa
- Bishop of Masvingo, Zimbabwe
- Archdiocese: Roman Catholic Archdiocese of Bulawayo
- Province: Roman Catholic Diocese of Masvingo
- Metropolis: Bulawayo
- Diocese: Masvingo
- Appointed: 15 September 2023
- Installed: 9 December 2023
- Predecessor: Michael Dixon Bhasera
- Successor: Incumbent
- Other posts: Bishop of Chinoyi (30 December 2017 - 15 September 2023); Apostolic Administrator of Chinhoyi (since 15 September 2023)

Orders
- Ordination: 4 August 2001
- Consecration: 7 April 2018 by Robert Christopher Ndlovu

Personal details
- Born: Raymond Tapiwa Mupandasekwa; 28 April 1970 (age 56) Masvingo, Zimbabwe
- Denomination: Roman Catholic
- Parents: Roswitta Madzima (mother) Fabian Mupandasekwa (father)
- Coat of arms

Raymond Tapiwa Mupandasekwa (born 28 April 1970) is a Zimbabwean Roman Catholic prelate who is the Bishop of the Roman Catholic Diocese of Masvingo, Zimbabwe since September 2023. Before that, from December 2017 until September 2023, he was the bishop of the Roman Catholic Diocese of Chinhoyi. He was appointed bishop on 30 December 2017 by Pope Francis. The bishop is a member of the Order of the Congregation of the Most Holy Redeemer.

== Early years and education ==
He was born on 28 April 1970 in Masvingo, Zimbabwe.

His parents (both deceased) were Catholics and were married in Mukaro Mission Parish in the Diocese of Masvingo. He studied as the Chishawasha National Major Seminary near Harare from 1991, graduating in 1993 with a Diploma in Philosophy. He again studied there from 1995 and graduated in 2000 with a Bachelor's degree in Religious Studies. He went on to obtain a Master's degree in Canon Law from St Augustine College of South Africa in 2003, having studied there since 2001. He also holds a Master of Arts in Moral Theology awarded by the Alphonsian Academy in Rome, Italy in 2010, having studied there since 2007.

== Priest ==
He entered the Order of the Congregation of the Most Holy Redeemer (Redemptorists) in 1996. In 2001 he took his perpetual vows as a member of that order. On 4 Aug 2001 he was ordained a priest of the order of the Redemptorists.

As a priest he served in various roles in different places including as:

- Curate of St. Fidelis Parish, in Mabvuku, Harare from 2001 until 2005.
- Parish priest of St. Gerards Parish Borrowdale, Harare from 2005 until 2007.
- Parish priest of St. Fidelis Parish in Mabvuku, Harare from 2010 until 2015.
- Lecturer in Moral Theology at Chishawasha Major Seminary from 2010 until 2014.
- Lecturer in Moral Theology at Holy Trinity College, Harare from 2010 until 2015.
- Lecturer in Canon Law at Holy Trinity College, Harare from 2012 until 2015.
- Redemptorist student formator from 2010 until 2015
- Dean of the "Outer City Deanary" for the Archdiocese of Harare from 2013 until 2015.
- Vice Rector of Holy Trinity College, Harare in 2014.
- Redemptorist Regional Superior in 2015.
- Member of the board of Governors of Holy Trinity College.

== Bishop ==
On 30 December 2017 Pope Francis appointed him bishop of the diocese of Chinhoyi, a Suffragan of the Metropolitan Province of Harare. He was consecrated and installed at the Chinhoyi University of Technology, in Chinhoyi, Diocese of Chinhoyi 7 April 2018.

On 15 September 2023 The Holy Father transferred him to be bishop of the Roman Catholic Diocese of Masvingo to succeed Bishop Michael Dixon Bhasera who retired in July 2022. Bishop Mupandasekwa was installed at Masvingo on 9 December 2023.

== See also ==
- Catholic Church in Zimbabwe

== Succession table ==
Catholic Church titles
Preceded by Dieter Bernd Scholz (6 April 2006 - 17 February 2016)	Bishop of Chinhoyi (30 December 2017 - 15 September 2023)	Succeeded by Patrick Ngwenya (since 11 April 2026)
Preceded by Michael Dixon Bhasera (9 Feb 1999 - 19 July 2022)	Bishop of Masvingo (since 15 September 2023)	Succeeded by Incumbent
