= Maria Kunz =

Swiss missionary doctor in South Africa (1899–1985)

- Born: 3 February 1899; Sissach
- Died: 5 June 1985 (aged 86); Queenstown, South Africa
- Other names: Nokunzi, Nonkunzi
- Occupation: Missionary doctor
- Known for: Founder of the Glen Grey Mission Hospital
- Awards: Pro Ecclesia et Pontifice (1956); Lateran Cross (1975)

Maria Kunz (3 February 1899 – 5 June 1985), known to her patients as Nokunzi, was a Swiss missionary doctor and the founder of a hospital and a school in the eastern Cape Province of South Africa.

== Early life and education ==
The daughter of Niklaus Kunz, owner of a department store, and Mina Emma, née Meier, the fourth of eight siblings, Kunz grew up in Sissach. She attended the secondary school of the institute of Menzingen, where she trained as a primary and secondary teacher. In 1926 she obtained her matura at the cantonal girls' lycée in Fribourg and from 1930 studied medicine at the universities of Basel and Fribourg, taking her doctorate in 1932. After obtaining the British medical diploma at the University of Dublin in 1934, she took courses in tropical medicine in London and Würzburg and worked as a surgical assistant in Zurich. She never married and had no children.

== Mission in South Africa ==
In 1936, Kunz left for South Africa with Bertha Hardegger, among the first Catholic women missionary doctors. From then on she worked for the Swiss Catholic Association for Missionary Medical Assistance. She devoted herself chiefly to the isiXhosa-speaking population in a rural region of 1,600 km^{2}, where poverty and disease were widespread due to the neglect of South Africa, whose policy rested on economic exploitation and racism.

In 1941, with the support of a German missionary society, Kunz—also known as Nokunzi by her patients—founded the Glen Grey Mission Hospital in Queenstown, which she directed until 1980. Around the same time she opened the Nokunzi School, named after her nickname. Mostly on the move, unlike many missionary doctors in Africa who practiced in clinics or hospitals, she worked outdoors and in improvised settings, treating some 10,000 people a year in her itinerant clinic and covering around 64,000 kilometers.

== Reception and legacy ==
In order to overcome the socio-professional barriers tied to gender and to act in innovative ways, Kunz seized the opportunities offered by a South Africa marked by colonialism. Her medical activity was always tied to the evangelizing aims of her missionary work. During apartheid in South Africa and decolonization on the rest of the continent, she continued to draw on negative stereotypes of indigenous populations, perpetuating the paternalism and racism that prevailed in European and missionary discourses on Africa.

For her work, Kunz was decorated by the Vatican with the Pro Ecclesia et Pontifice cross in 1956 and the Lateran Cross in 1975. In 2017, the exhibition Nokunzi was held in Sissach. In 2021, a play devoted to her life and work was performed in the former Cheesmeyer department store in Sissach, founded by Joseph Meyer-Kunz, an ancestor of the missionary doctor.

== Bibliography ==
- K. Birkhäuser, "Maria Kunz", in Personenlexikon des Kantons Basel-Landschaft, 1997.
- V. Noble, "On the roadside: Maria Kunz and the practice of itinerant missionary doctoring in rural South Africa, 1930s to 1970s", in Social History of Medicine, 33/1, 2020, pp. 309–329.
- S. Rees, Missionary Architectures of Difference. Negotiating "Race", Gender, and Sexuality between Switzerland and Colonial Zimbabwe (1938–1965), doctoral thesis, University of Fribourg, 2024.
