= Martin Munyanyi =

Bishop of Gweru (1956–2022)

His Excellency Martin Munyanyi
- Bishop of Gweru
- Diocese: Gweru
- Appointed: 11 May 2006
- Term ended: 28 April 2012
- Predecessor: Francis Xavier Mugadzi
- Successor: Xavier Johnsai Munyongani

Orders
- Ordination: 3 September 1983
- Consecration: 26 August 2006 by Michael Dixon Bhasera

Personal details
- Born: 3 January 1956 Bikita, Southern Rhodesia
- Died: 15 May 2022 (aged 66) Shurugwi, Zimbabwe

Martin Munyanyi (3 January 1956 – 15 May 2022) was a Zimbabwean clergyman and bishop for the Roman Catholic Diocese of Gweru. He became ordained in 1983. He was appointed bishop in 2006. He resigned in 2012.

Catholic Church titles
| Preceded by Francis Xavier Mugadzi | Bishop of Gweru; 2006–2012 | Succeeded by Xavier Johnsai Munyongani |
