= Raphael Macebo Mabuza Ncube =

Zimbabwean Roman Catholic prelate (born 1949)

The Most Reverend Raphael Macebo Mabuza Ncube
- Bishop of Hwange, Zimbabwe
- Church: Catholic Church
- Archdiocese: Roman Catholic Archdiocese of Bulawayo
- See: Hwange
- Appointed: 5 July 2021
- Installed: 30 October 2021
- Predecessor: José Alberto Serrano Antón
- Successor: Incumbent

Orders
- Ordination: 3 February 2001
- Consecration: 30 October 2021 by Alex Thomas Kaliyanil
- Rank: Bishop

Personal details
- Born: Raphael Macebo Mabuza Ncube; 4 October 1973 (age 52) Nkayi, Matabeleland North, Diocese of Bulawayo, Zimbabwe

Styles of Raphael Macebo Mabuza Ncube
- Reference style: Your Lordship; The Most Reverend
- Spoken style: His Lordship
- Religious style: Bishop

Raphael Macebo Mabuza Ncube (born 4 October 1973) is a Zimbabwean Roman Catholic prelate who is the Bishop of the Roman Catholic Diocese of Hwange, Zimbabwe since 2021. He was appointed bishop by Pope Francis on 5 July 2021. He was consecrated and installed there on 30 October 2021.

== Background and education ==
He was born on 4 October 1973, at Nkayi, Matabeleland North, Archdiocese of Bulawayo, Zimbabwe.

He attended Mathetshaneni Primary School in Nkayi District. For his secondary school education, he attended Nkayi High School, graduating in 1992. In 1993 he entered the Mazowe Minor Seminary at Mazowe. He then transferred to the St. Charles Lwanga Major Seminary at Chimanimani, in Manicaland Province. At Chimanimani, he studied philosophy. In 1995 he transferred to the Chishawasha Major Seminary, about 25 kilometres (16 mi) east of Harare, where he completed his philosophy course in 1996. He continued with his study of theology at Chishawasha from 1997.

Later, in 2008, he graduated with a Licentiate in Spiritual Theology from the Teresianum in Rome, Italy. Still later, he obtained a Doctorate in Spiritual Theology from the same university.

== Priest ==
He was ordained a deacon on 9 July 2000 at Holy Spirit Parish in Nkulumane, in the Archdiocese of Bulawayo. On 3 February 2001 he was ordained a priest of the Roman Catholic Archdiocese of Bulawayo on 3 February 2001 at St. Pius Parish in Njube. He served in that capacity until 5 July 2021.

As a priest, Monsignor Raphael Macebo Mabuza Ncube served in different roles in various locations including:

- Assistant priest of Embakwe Mission in 2001.
- Parish priest of Embakwe Mission Parish in 2001.
- Spiritual Director for the Youth in the Archdiocese of Bulawayo from 2001 until 2003.
- Spiritual Director for the Minor Seminary in the Archdiocese of Bulawayo from 2001 until 2003.
- Rector of the Minor Seminary in Bulawayo from 2003 until 2005.
- Parish priest of St. Adolf Parish from 2003 until 2005.
- Parish priest of St. Bernard's Parish in 2005.
- Spiritual Director at St. Augustine Seminary in Bulawayo (closed in 2016)
- Spiritual Director at Chishawasha Major Seminary in Harare.

== As bishop ==
On 5 July 2021, Pope Francis appointed Reverend Father Raphael Macebo Mabuza Ncube as Bishop of the Roman Catholic Diocese of Hwange in Zimbabwe. He was consecrated and installed at the Hwange Colliery Stadium, in Hwange, Diocese of Hwange on 30 October 2021. The Principal Consecrator was Archbishop Alex Thomas Kaliyanil, Archbishop of Bulawayo assisted by Archbishop Paolo Rudelli, Titular Archbishop of Mesembria and Bishop José Alberto Serrano Antón, Bishop Emeritus of Hwange.

== See also ==
- Catholic Church in Zimbabwe

== Succession table ==
Catholic Church titles
| Preceded by José Alberto Serrano Antón (5 December 2006 - 5 July 2021) | Bishop of Hwange (since 5 July 2021) | Succeeded by Incumbent |
