= Ángel Floro Martínez =

Spanish bishop (1940–2023)

His Excellency Ángel Floro Martínez
- Bishop Emeritus of Gokwe
- Metropolis: Harare
- Appointed: 15 October 1999
- Term ended: 28 January 2017
- Predecessor: Michael Dixon Bhasera
- Successor: Rudolf Nyandoro

Orders
- Ordination: 28 June 1965
- Consecration: 19 February 2000 by Michael Dixon Bhasera

Personal details
- Born: 24 February 1940 Aýna, Albacete, Spain
- Died: 14 March 2023 (aged 83) Gweru, Zimbabwe

Ángel Floro Martínez (24 February 1940 – 14 March 2023) was a Spanish Roman Catholic prelate. He was bishop of Gokwe from 2000 to 2017. Floro died on 14 March 2023, at the age of 83.

Catholic Church titles
Preceded by Michael Dixon Bhasera	Bishop of Gokwe; 1999–2017	Succeeded by Rudolf Nyandoro
