= Patrick Mumbure Mutume =

Rhodesian Roman Catholic bishop

Patrick Mumbure Mutume (October 31, 1943 – February 8, 2017) was a Roman Catholic bishop.

Ordained to the priesthood in 1972, Mutume served as auxiliary bishop of the Roman Catholic Diocese of Mutare, Zimbabwe, from 1979 until his death.
