= Donal Lamont =

The Right Reverend Donald Lamont OCarm
- Bishop of Umtali
- Church: Catholic Church
- Diocese: Umtali (today Mutare)
- Appointed: 15 February 1957 by Pope Pius XII
- Term ended: 5 November 1981
- Successor: Alexio Churu Muchabaiwa

Orders
- Ordination: 11 July 1937
- Consecration: 16 June 1957 by Celestine Damiano

Personal details
- Born: 27 July 1911 Ballycastle, County Antrim, Ulster, Ireland (now Northern Ireland)
- Died: 14 August 2003 (aged 92) Dublin, County Dublin, Ireland
- Education: University College, Dublin
- Motto: Ut placeam Deo "In the presence of God"

Ordination history of Donal Lamont
History
Priestly ordination
- Date: 11 July 1937
- Place: Rome, Italy
Episcopal consecration
- Principal consecrator: Celestine Damiano
- Co-consecrators: Francis William Markall; Aloysius Haene
- Date: 16 June 1957
- Place: Southern Rhodesia
Episcopal succession
Bishops consecrated by Donal Lamont as principal consecrator
- Patrick Mumbure Mutume: 17 June 1979
- Alexio Churu Muchabaiwa: 21 February 1982

Donal Raymond Lamont OCarm (27 July 1911 – 14 August 2003), was an Irish-Rhodesian Roman Catholic bishop and missionary who was best known for his fight against white minority rule in Rhodesia (now Zimbabwe).

== Early years ==
Donal Raymond Lamont was born on 27 July 1911 at Ballycastle, County Antrim, in Ulster, the northern province in Ireland. He was a pupil at the Carmelite school Terenure College, in Dublin. In 1929 he entered the Carmelite Order, doing his novitiate in Kinsale, County Cork.

After studies at University College Dublin, he studied theology at St Albert's College, Rome and was ordained as a priest in Rome during July 1937. On returning to Ireland, he taught English literature at Terenure. In 1946, he volunteered to go to the new Carmelite mission in Southern Rhodesia (now Zimbabwe), and went with two companions to Umtali (now known as Mutare), in the east of the country, and close to the border with Mozambique. In August 1953, Southern Rhodesia joined with Northern Rhodesia and Nyasaland to form the Federation of Rhodesia and Nyasaland, a form of 'federal colony' within the British Empire. In 1957, Umtali was given the status of a diocese, and Lamont appointed its first bishop.

== Purchased People ==
In 1959, Bishop Lamont wrote his first pastoral letter as a bishop, entitled Purchased People. This dealt with matters relating to racial prejudice and segregation, and was highly critical of the policies of the Government of the Federation of Rhodesia and Nyasaland. The letter contained a strong denunciation of those who treated members of other races as inferior. He explicitly based this on the Catholic teaching on the dignity of the human person: "Should not reason and justice and every noble instinct of civilised man, and particularly of every Christian man, rebel at the thought of despising or branding with a stigma of inferiority, our neighbour with whom we share so much in common?". Throughout the letter, he repeatedly contrasted the attitudes and actions of the Government of the Federation of Rhodesia and Nyasaland and the white minority with those that he regarded as authentically Christian.

The specific problems that he concentrated on were those of the confiscation of land, and governmental control of education. In particular he condemned the difference in educational opportunity available to children of the two racial groups, and accused the government of obstructing efforts by Christian missionaries to improve educational provision for black children: "Missionaries have been waiting, quite literally for years, for permission from the State to open the most elementary kind of village schools which the African people require and demand and are willing to erect at their own expense; and the applications, detailed and in writing, are still ungranted."

== UDI ==
The Federation of Rhodesia and Nyasaland was broken up at the end of December 1963. Southern Rhodesia reverted to being a self-governing Crown colony in its own right when the Federation ended. When Ian Smith came to power in Salisbury and declared Southern Rhodesia's independence as Rhodesia in November 1965, Bishop Lamont was horrified. He had been a long-time critic of the policies of both the Government of the Federation of Rhodesia and Nyasaland and the Government of Southern Rhodesia, claiming they were racist. Amongst his criticism, Lamont wrote an open letter to Ian Smith, then Prime Minister of Rhodesia, saying: "Far from your policies defending Christianity and Western civilization, as you claim, they mock the law of Christ and make communism attractive to the African people." In other writings he declared Rhodesia's constitution and land apportionment laws to be segregationist, unfair and "a direct contradiction of the New Testament's teaching". He denounced the white people in power in the country as a colonial-style clique while praising black leaders and their guerrillas as freedom fighters.

He continued to be highly critical of the Rhodesian Government, speaking out against their segregationist policies and also accusing them of responsibility for atrocities carried out by the armed forces. He had no criticism to make of the guerillas' activities.

== Trial and deportation ==
Bishop Lamont was tried in 1976, accused of permitting nuns within his diocese to give medical aid to black guerrillas and advising the nuns not to report this to the authorities, for their own safety. He pleaded guilty and was sentenced to ten years imprisonment with hard labour, which was reduced to four years on appeal. He was detained in Salisbury Hospital, where he received treatment for injuries caused in a car accident, while the Rhodesian Government quietly made arrangements to just have him deported. His Rhodesian citizenship was revoked and he was deported to Ireland in 1977. He was nominated for the Nobel Peace Prize in 1978.

After the fall of the Smith government, he returned to his diocese, but later resigned and his place was taken by an African bishop, Alexio Muchabaiwa. Lamont then retired to the Carmelite community at Terenure College in Dublin, where he died on 14 August 2003.
