= Diocese of Masvingo =

Latin Catholic diocese in Zimbabwe

Diocese of Masvingo Dioecesis Masvingensis

Location
- Country: Zimbabwe
- Territory: Civil districts of Beitbridge, Chiredzi, Chivi, Gutu, Bikita, Masvingo, Mwenezi, Zaka
- Ecclesiastical province: Bulawayo
- Metropolitan: Bulawayo

Statistics
- Area: 70,000 km^{2} (27,000 sq mi)
- Population: Total; Catholics: (as of 2006); 1,312,484; 181,234 (13.8%)
- Parishes: 19
- Schools: 23

Information
- Denomination: Catholic Church
- Sui iuris church: Latin Church
- Rite: Roman Rite
- Established: 9 February 1999
- Cathedral: Cathedral of Sts. Peter and Paul
- Patron saint: Mary Queen of Peace
- Secular priests: 28

Current leadership
- Pope: Leo XIV
- Bishop: Raymond Tapiwa Mupandasekwa
- Metropolitan Archbishop: Alex Kaliyanil
- Apostolic Administrator: Robert Christopher Ndlovu
- Vicar General: Walter Nyatsanza
- Bishops emeritus: Michael Dixon Bhasera

Map
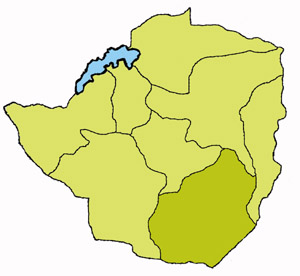
- Map showing Diocese of Masvingo

There is also a Diocese of Masvingo (and a Bishop of Masvingo) in the Anglican Church of the Province of Central Africa.

The Diocese of Masvingo (Latin: Masvingen(sis)) is a Latin Catholic suffragan diocese in the city of Masvingo in the ecclesiastical province of Bulawayo in Zimbabwe.

== History ==
- February 9, 1999: Established as the Diocese of Masvingo from the Diocese of Gweru

== Bishops ==
- Michael Dixon Bhasera (9 February 1999 – 19 July 2022)

Other priests of this diocese who became bishops

- Xavier Johnsai Munyongani, appointed Bishop of Gweru in 2013
- Rudolf Nyandoro, appointed Bishop of Gokwe in 2017

== See also ==
- Catholic Church in Zimbabwe

== Sources ==
- GCatholic.org
- "Diocese of Masvingo". Catholic-Hierarchy.org. David M. Cheney.
