= Johannes Evangelist Kleiser =

German Catholic priest active in Switzerland (1845–1919)

- Born: 30 October 1845; Schollach, Black Forest
- Died: 17 September 1919 (aged 73); Fribourg
- Other name: Jean Evangelist Kleiser
- Occupation: Catholic priest
- Known for: Co-founder of the Saint Peter Canisius Work

Johannes Evangelist Kleiser (also Jean Evangelist Kleiser; 30 October 1845 – 17 September 1919) was a German Catholic priest active in Switzerland and co-founder, with Maria Wellauer, of the Saint Peter Canisius Work in Fribourg.

== Life and career ==
Kleiser was the son of Alois Kleiser, a watchmaker, and Theresia, née Schwörer. He attended the gymnasium in Freiburg im Breisgau and entered the seminary there in 1867. Ordained a priest in 1871, he served as a curate in Bühl in Baden. During the German Kulturkampf, Kleiser fled to Switzerland to avoid a judicial conviction for having delivered political sermons from the pulpit in breach of the Kanzelparagraf.

In 1873 he became the assistant of Joseph Schorderet at the Saint Paul Work in Fribourg, and in 1875 a curate in Fribourg. Strictly ultramontane in outlook, Kleiser parted ways with the Saint Paul Work in 1898 and, together with Maria Wellauer, founded the Saint Peter Canisius Work, whose community of sisters was recruited largely from domestic servants. He was made an apostolic protonotary in 1897.

== Bibliography ==
- E. Camenzind, Der Frohbotschaft verpflichtet: Die Kanisiusschwestern und ihr Gründer Johannes Evangelist Kleiser, 1998.
- G. Schelbert, Geschichte des Kanisiuswerks und der Kanisiusschwestern in Freiburg in der Schweiz, 3 vols., 1998.
