= Diocese of Gokwe =

Roman Catholic diocese in Zimbabwe

Coordinates: 18.2146°S 28.9519°E

Diocese of Gokwe Dioecesis Gokvensis

Location
- Country: Zimbabwe
- Territory: Districts of Gokwe North, Gokwe South, the area of Omay between the Sengwa and Sanyati rivers in the Kariba District, Nkayi District north of the Shangani river.
- Ecclesiastical province: Harare

Statistics
- Area: 26,000 km^{2} (10,000 sq mi)
- Population: Total; Catholics: (as of 2016); 648,000; 79,800 (12.3%)
- Parishes: 17
- Schools: 11

Information
- Denomination: Roman Catholic
- Rite: Latin Rite
- Established: June 17, 1991
- Patron saint: St. Paul
- Secular priests: 26

Current leadership
- Pope: Leo XIV
- Bishop: Eusebius Jelous Nyathi
- Metropolitan Archbishop: Archbishop Robert Ndlovu
- Vicar General: Father Joseph Mugara

Map
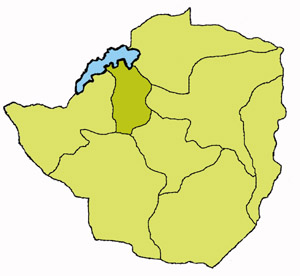

The Roman Catholic Diocese of Gokwe (Latin: Gokven(sis)) is a suffragan diocese in the city of Gokwe in the ecclesiastical province of Harare in Zimbabwe.

== History ==
- June 17, 1991: Established as Diocese of Gokwe from Diocese of Hwange

== Bishops ==
1. Michael Dixon Bhasera (17 June 1991 – 9 February 1999)
2. Ángel Floro Martínez, IEME (15 October 1999 – 28 April 2017)
3. Rudolf Nyandoro (29 April 2017 – 11 September 2020)
4. Eusebius Jelous Nyathi (23 June 2023 – )

== See also ==
- Catholic Church in Zimbabwe

== Sources ==
- GCatholic.org
- "Diocese of Gokwe". Catholic-Hierarchy.org. David M. Cheney.
