= Francis Xavier Mugadzi =

Zimbabwean clergyman and bishop

- Bishop of Gweru
- Church: Catholic Church
- Diocese: Diocese of Gweru
- In office: 25 October 1988 – 6 February 2004
- Predecessor: Tobias Wunganayi Chiginya
- Successor: Martin Munyanyi

Orders
- Ordination: 12 December 1964
- Consecration: 14 January 1989 by Alois Häne

Personal details
- Born: 20 February 1931 Gokomere (northwest of Masvingo), Southern Rhodesia, British Empire
- Died: 6 February 2004 (aged 72)

Francis Xavier Mugadzi (20 February 1931 in Gokomere – 6 February 2004) was a Zimbabwean clergyman and bishop for the Roman Catholic Diocese of Gweru. He became ordained in 1964. He was appointed bishop in 1988. He died on 6 February 2004.
