= Tobias Wunganayi Chiginya =

Roman-catholic bishop

- Bishop of Gweru
- Church: Catholic Church
- Diocese: Diocese of Gweru
- In office: 3 February 1977 – 14 January 1987
- Predecessor: Alois Häne
- Successor: Francis Xavier Mugadzi

Orders
- Ordination: 28 August 1966
- Consecration: 30 April 1977 by Alois Häne

Personal details
- Born: 5 March 1935 Hama (in present-day Chirumhanzu District), Southern Rhodesia, British Empire
- Died: 14 January 1987 (aged 51)

Tobias Wunganayi Chiginya (born 5 March 1935 in Hama, Zimbabwe – 14 January 1987) was a Zimbabwean clergyman and bishop for the Roman Catholic Diocese of Gweru.

Chiginya was born in Chirumanzu. He became ordained in 1966.

He was appointed as the second bishop of Gweru on 3 February 1977. During his time there, he was instrumental in the founding of the African Brothers of St Paul, allowing the new congregation to use his house for training. He died in 1987 in a car crash.

== Publications ==
"Deathbed reflections of Bishop Chiginya"
