= Zimbabwe National Statistics Agency =

Zimbabwean government agency

Agency overview
- Preceding agency: Central Statistical Office
- Jurisdiction: Government of Zimbabwe
- Headquarters: 20th Floor Kaguvi Building; Cnr Fourth St./Central Ave, 183; Harare
- Employees: 1000+
- Website: www.zimstat.co.zw

Zimbabwe National Statistics Agency (ZIMSTAT) is the statistics agency of Zimbabwe. It is headquartered in the Kaguvi Building in Harare.

Census and Statistics Act of 2007 created the agency. It replaced the Central Statistical Office (CSO). It was headquartered in the Kaguvi Building in Harare.
