= Alois Häne =

Swiss Catholic missionary bishop (1910–1999)

- Church: Catholic Church
- Diocese: Gwelo
- Installed: 1955
- Term ended: 1977
- Previous posts: Apostolic prefect (1947); Apostolic vicar and titular bishop of Nepte (1950)

Orders
- Ordination: 1939
- Consecration: 1950

Personal details
- Born: 6 August 1910 Kirchberg
- Died: 19 February 1999 (aged 88) Driefontein, Zimbabwe

Alois Häne (6 August 1910 – 19 February 1999) was a Swiss Catholic missionary and bishop of Gwelo (Gweru, present-day Zimbabwe) from 1955 to 1977.

== Life and career ==
Häne was the son of Alois Häne, a farmer, and Berta, née Huber. He attended primary and secondary school in Kirchberg and the gymnasium in Immensee from 1925 to 1932. He studied philosophy and theology at the missionary seminary of Schöneck in Emmetten, where he became a member of the Bethlehem Mission Society. After his ordination in 1939, he was a missionary in Southern Rhodesia (present-day Zimbabwe). He was appointed apostolic prefect in 1947, apostolic vicar in 1950 (as titular bishop of Nepte), and bishop of Gwelo in 1955. He served as president of the Rhodesian Bishops' Conference in 1967.

A pioneer in the fields of education, hygiene, social welfare, and the press, Häne founded the African community of the Little Sisters of Jesus and remained their adviser after his resignation in 1977.

== Bibliography ==
- W. Heim, "Alois Häne", in Schweizerische Kirchenzeitung, 143, 1975, 607.
