= Michael Dixon Bhasera =

Zimbabwean Roman Catholic prelate (born 1949)

The Most Reverend Michael Dixon Bhasera
- Bishop Emeritus of Masvingo, Zimbabwe
- Church: Catholic Church
- Archdiocese: Roman Catholic Archdiocese of Bulawayo
- See: Masvingo
- Appointed: 9 February 1999
- Installed: 9 February 1999
- Term ended: 19 July 2022
- Successor: Raymond Tapiwa Mupandasekwa
- Other posts: Apostolic Administrator of Gweru, Zimbabwe (28 April 2012 - 15 June 2013) and (24 October 2017 - 24 October 2020)

Orders
- Ordination: 19 August 1978
- Consecration: 19 October 1991 by Francis Xavier Mugadzi
- Rank: Bishop

Personal details
- Born: Michael Dixon Bhasera; 11 November 1949 (age 76) Gutu, Masvingo Province, Zimbabwe

Styles of Michael Dixon Bhasera
- Reference style: Your Lordship; The Most Reverend
- Spoken style: His Lordship
- Religious style: Bishop

Michael Dixon Bhasera (born 11 November 1949) is a Zimbabwean Roman Catholic prelate who served as the Bishop of the Roman Catholic Diocese of Masvingo, Zimbabwe from 1999 until his resignation in 2022. Before that, from June 1991 until February 1999 he was Bishop of the Roman Catholic Diocese of Gokwe, Zimbabwe. He served as Apostolic Administrator of the diocese of Gweru from April 2012 until June 2013 and from October 2017 until October 2020. He was appointed bishop by Pope John Paul II in 1991. He resigned from pastoral service on 19 July 2022 at the age of 72 years and 7 months of age. He lives on as Archbishop Emeritus of Masvingo, Zimbabwe.

== Background and priesthood ==
He was born on 11 November 1949, at Gutu, Masvingo Province, Zimbabwe. He studied both philosophy and theology before he was ordained a priest in August 1978.

== Priest ==
He was ordained a priest on 19 August 1978. He served in that capacity until 17 June 1991.

== As bishop ==
On 17 June 1991, Pope John Paul II appointed Reverend Father Michael Dixon Bhasera as Bishop of the Roman Catholic Diocese of Gokwe in Zimbabwe. He was consecrated and installed at the Uganda Martyrs Church, Gokwe, in the Diocese of Gokwe on 19 October 1991. The Principal Consecrator was Bishop Francis Xavier Mugadzi, Bishop of Gweru assisted by Archbishop Giacinto Berloco, Titular Archbishop of Fidenae and Bishop Ignacio Prieto Vega, Bishop of Hwange. He served there in that capacity until 9 February 1999.

On 9 February 1999 the Holy Father created the Roman Catholic Diocese of Masvingo. The Pope appointed him as the pioneer bishop of the new Ordinary See. He served there in that capacity until 19 July 2022, when he resigned. While bishop at Masvingo, he served as Apostolic Administrator of the diocese of Gweru from April 2012 until June 2013 and from October 2017 until October 2020.

== See also ==
- Catholic Church in Zimbabwe

== Succession table ==
Catholic Church titles
Preceded by None (Diocese created)	Bishop of Gokwe (17 June 1991 - 9 February 1999)	Succeeded by Angel Floro Martínez (15 October 1999 - 28 January 2017)
Preceded by None (Diocese created)	Bishop of Masvingo (9 February 1999 - 19 July 2022)	Succeeded by Raymond Tapiwa Mupandasekwa (since 15 September 2023)
