= Bethlehem Mission Society =

Missionary society of apostolic life

The Bethlehem Mission Society (Latin: Societas Missionum Exterarum de Bethlehem in Helvetia; abbreviation: SMB) is a Society of Apostolic Life consisting of priests and brothers who have joined for missionary service. As a Society of Apostolic Life, the Bethlehem Mission Society is not a religious order and is directly subordinate to the Dicastery for Evangelization in Rome. The members of the Mission Society lead a life according to the evangelical counsels, i.e. poverty, obedience, and celibacy. In May 2021, the Society marked the 100th anniversary of the papal decree. The origins of the Society date back to 1895.

== History ==
=== Origins ===
The origins of the Bethlehem Mission Society go back to the French priest Pierre-Marie Barral. In 1895, he founded the "Ecole apostolique de Bethléem" (Apostolic School of Bethlehem) in Meggen, Switzerland, which was moved to Immensee in 1896. It became the Gymnasium Bethlehem, Immensee (Bethlehem grammar school/high school). In the same year, the first issue of the multilingual monthly magazine "Bethlehem" appeared, which was published under the name "Wendekreis" from 1972 until 2017.

While the institute originally aimed to train the sons of poor families for missionary service in Europe's abandoned parishes, missionary activities in Asia, Africa and Latin America were developed over time. Circles of friends were formed in Austria, Italy, France, Great Britain, Portugal, and the USA. Difficulties in the work, which was financed through stamp trading, dishonest fundraising, and loans, led to a reorganization as the Bethlehem Mission House in 1907 by the later first Superior General Pietro Bondolfi.

On 30 May 1921, the papal decree establishing the "Swiss Seminary for Foreign Missions" was issued in Rome. Pietro Bondolfi was the first Superior General. From 1934, the association was called the "Society for Foreign Missions of Bethlehem in Switzerland" (Societas Missionaria de Bethlehem in Helvetia). It is known as the Bethlehem Mission Society (SMB).

Most of the new members of the Society were recruited from the Gymnasium Bethlehem (Bethlehem grammar school) run for this purpose in Immensee. This included the "Progymnasium" (lower Forms) in Rebstein (1926–73) and Fribourg (1938–72). In 1995, the grammar school/high school was transferred to a private foundation under the name "Gymnasium Immensee".

The training of candidates for the priesthood began in 1922 at the seminary in Wolhusen, and was later transferred to the "Bruder-Klausen-Seminar" (Seminary of St. Nicholas of Flüe) in Schöneck (Emmetten) in 1932, and has taken place at the Faculty of Theology in Lucerne since 1969.

In 1925, the first brother missionaries were admitted into the SMB to work in administration, schools, businesses, and agriculture. The Brothers, as well as the candidates for the priesthood and the priests, pledge to live according to the principles of the SMB.

Research into missions and religious studies became a focal point in 1945 with the founding of the "Neue Zeitschrift für Missionswissenschaft" (NZM – New Journal for Missiology). From mission territories to missionary assignments

=== Before the Second Vatican Council ===
In 1924, the first three missionaries traveled to China, where they first learned the Chinese language and culture from the Steyler missionaries in Yanzhou, South Shandong. In June 1925, the Apostolic Delegate Celso Costantini granted them their own mission territory, the prefecture of Qiqihar in the far north of China.

On 19 March 1926, Paul Hugentobler and Eugen Imhof arrived in Qiqihar, while Gustav Schnetzler took over the village of Changfatun. The SMB dedicated itself to building up local Christian communities and, together with the Ingenbohl Sisters, the development of medical care and school education. In 1940, 42 SMB priests were working there. Most of them were expelled in 1953 and the last one left China in 1954.

In 1938, the SMB began its work in what was then Southern Rhodesia, now Zimbabwe. At times, well over 100 members worked there in building up the local church, in education and healthcare, in the media and in training craftsmen.

In 1948, the SMB sent the first missionaries to Iwate-ken in northern Japan. In the same year, the SMB started its first assignments with lay people in what was then Fort Victoria, now Masvingo, in Southern Rhodesia. Following the expulsion of the last missionaries from China, the SMB began its work in Taiwan and Colombia in 1953.

=== After the Second Vatican Council ===
As a result of the Second Vatican Council's revaluation of lay people in missionary and church service and a new understanding of mission, more and more lay people became involved in SMB projects. The first mixed assignments of lay people and priests (teams) were formed. The SMB General Chapter in 1967 enshrined the "work with a view to replacement" in its documents. It no longer took over assigned areas (territorial principle) but began with temporary project assignments. The first such assignment was started in Zambia in 1969.

The 1974 General Chapter confirmed project work as the new form of missionary work. The following main motives were formative: the essential connection between missionary work and development cooperation; the partnership with the local churches; the basic ecumenical orientation. In 1975, team assignments began in Peru, 1977 in Ecuador, 1978 in Kenya, 1985 in the Philippines, and 1992 in Bolivia.

At the 1981 General Chapter, "integral liberation" was formulated with the following three options:

- Option for and with the poor
- Commitment to human rights
- Building up grassroots communities

The 1988 General Chapter made it possible for women and men to join the SMB in the "Association". The Association was transformed into the "Partner Association Bethlehem" (PaV) in 2000. On 17 November 2000, the association "Bethlehem Mission Immensee" (BMI) was founded in accordance with Art. 60ff of the Swiss Civil Code. This enabled the missionary mandate of the SMB to be based on a broader sponsorship with the aim that PaV and SMB members would decide on the planning and implementation of the missionary mandate on an equal footing and in partnership. In the summer of 2013, the "Bethlehem Mission Immensee" went its own way and moved its headquarters to the Romero House in Lucerne, which it purchased from the SMB. The development work of BMI was taken over by "Comundo".

== Activity ==
The Bethlehem Mission Society (SMB) has its traditional headquarters in Immensee. With its management and administration, it accompanies its missionary assignments in Africa (Zimbabwe, Kenya), Asia (Taiwan), Latin America (Colombia), and Europe (Switzerland)

The 2023 General Chapter of the Bethlehem Mission Society elected Ludovic Nobel as Superior General, Emilio Näf as Vicar General, and Josef Meili as Councillor General. The focal points of the 14th ordinary General Chapter 2023 included the future of the Immensee House, the management structure of the Mission Society, the regulations for individual assignments, the second construction phase of "Living in Bethlehem", and the future of the SMB (including the admission of new candidates).

=== In Switzerland ===
The largest group of members of the Bethlehem Mission Society live and work in Switzerland today. In addition to the two locations in Immensee and Fribourg, there are several outposts. Most of the members working there were previously active on other continents.

=== The Torry House in Fribourg ===
A small community of missionaries lives together with students from the University of Fribourg in the Torry House in Fribourg. These students come mainly from Africa and Asia. The local confreres carry out pastoral work in the French-speaking parishes. The confrere Ludovic Nobel teaches New Testament at the University of Fribourg.

=== Africa ===
Four members of the Society currently live in Zimbabwe, two of them in the SMB house in Driefontein and two as spiritual directors with the Sisters and Brothers of Jesus of Nazareth (SBJN) (as of 2023). One member currently lives in Nairobi, Kenya (as of 2023).

=== Taiwan ===
Two confreres currently live in Taiwan (as of 2023), one in the SMB house in Taitung, which is a centre for retreats and reflection days for parishes and religious groups of the diocese and the whole country, the other is active in pastoral care and supervises the foot reflexology massage school which he founded.

=== Colombia ===
Two confreres from the Bethlehem Mission Society are currently living in the SMB house in Popayán, from where they provide pastoral care in the parishes. Father Josef Schönenberger received the recognition award from the Alois and Jeanne Jurt Foundation for his human rights work in Colombia.

=== The SMB Friendship Circle ===
The SMB Friendship Circle connects friends of the Bethlehem Mission Society, organizes encounters with the SMB community and its members, and brings the Mission Society's ideas to the public. The SMB Friendship Circle has existed since August 2016. It was founded following a suggestion by Bethlehem missionary Pablo Meier.

=== Housing settlement in Bethlehem ===
The SMB owns several buildings and properties, most of which were donated to the Mission Society by private individuals.

In 2013, the SMB decided to build a multi-generational settlement on its property near the motherhouse in Immensee. "Living in Bethlehem" is being realized by the Bethlehem Mission House Association in four stages, presumably until 2037 [20]. After eight years of planning and implementation, tenants were able to move into the 51 apartments of the first stage in 2021.

=== Bethlehem Mission House Association ===
As a church community, the Bethlehem Mission Society can only exercise civil and secular rights and obligations to a limited extent. For this purpose, the Bethlehem Mission House Association was founded in 1907.

=== SMB archives ===
The archives of SMB contain extensive documents relating to the Mission Society, including the SMB missions in Africa, Asia, and Latin America, and a range of audiovisual media documenting the worldwide work of the SMB missionaries. The archives also contain holdings from the schools and training centres of the Mission Society, such as the Immensee grammar school/high school, the two "Progymnasium" (lower Forms) Rebstein and Torry as well as the Wolhusen and Schöneck mission seminaries. Since 2014, the Mission Society's archives have been located in the Lucerne State Archives, where they are open to interested parties for research purposes.

== List of Superiors General ==
- 1921–1943: Pietro Bondolfi
- 1947–1957: Eduard Blatter
- 1957–1967: Max Blöchliger
- 1967–1981: Josef Amstutz
- 1981–1993: Josef Elsener
- 1993–2003: Josef Meili
- 2003–2008: Emil Näf
- 2008-2013: Josef Meili
- 2013–2018: Ernst Wildi
- 2018-2023: Josef Meili
- 2023–present: Ludovic Nobel

== Notable members ==
- Pierre-Marie Barral, founder of the Apostolic School of Bethlehem (1855–1929) (not a member of the SMB)
- Pietro Bondolfi, founder and first Superior General of the SMB (1872–1943)
- Johannes Beckmann, Prof. Dr., expert in missiology (1901–1971)
- Josef Maria Camenzind (1904–1984), writer
- Josef Eugster (* 1940), missionary in Taiwan and foot reflexology therapist
- Julius Felder, architect
- Thomas Immoos (1918–2001), sinologist and university professor in Tokyo
- Oskar Stoffel (1932–1997), professor of canon law
- Hansjörg Auf der Maur (1933–1999), liturgical scholar
- Al Imfeld (1935–2017), publicist and writer
- Karl Freuler (1912–2000), theologian and architect
- Josef Schmidlin (1923–2015), Japan missionary and photographer
- John Groeber (1903–1973), missionary in Southern Rhodesia (now Zimbabwe) and architect of St. Mary's Church on the site of the Serima Mission in Zimbabwe
- Georg Schelbert (1922–2015), Swiss theologian and exegete
- Michael Traber (1929–2006), missionary in Southern Rhodesia and media scientist
