= Diocese of Chinhoyi =

Roman Catholic diocese in Zimbabwe

Coordinates: 17.3734°S 30.1788°E

Diocese of Chinhoyi Dioecesis Chinhoyiensis

Location
- Country: Zimbabwe
- Territory: Districts of Makonde, Hurungwe, Kariba (East of Sanyati River), Guruve, Centenary, Mount Darwin, Rushinga (North of Mazowe River)
- Ecclesiastical province: Harare

Statistics
- Area: 56,000 km^{2} (22,000 sq mi)
- Population: Total; Catholics: (as of 2016); 3,000,540; 214,400 (7.1%)
- Parishes: 19
- Schools: 10

Information
- Denomination: Roman Catholic
- Rite: Latin Rite
- Patron saint: Kizito Francis Xavier
- Secular priests: 36

Current leadership
- Pope: Leo XIV
- Bishop: Patrick Ngwenya
- Metropolitan Archbishop: Robert Christopher Ndlovu
- Apostolic Administrator: Raymond Tapiwa Mupandasekwa, C.Ss.R.
- Vicar General: Father Keneth Mapanda
- Bishops emeritus: Dieter Bernd Scholz, S.J.

Map
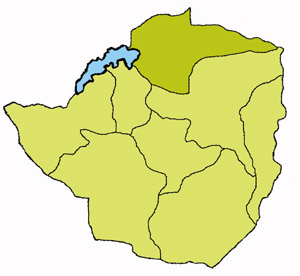

The Roman Catholic Diocese of Chinhoyi (Latin: Chinhoyien(sis)) is a suffragan diocese in the city of Chinhoyi in the ecclesiastical province of Harare in Zimbabwe. The bishop is based in the city of Chinhoyi.

== History ==
- A mission was established in 1958 staffed by German Jesuits.
- December 17, 1973: Established as the Apostolic Prefecture of Sinoia from Metropolitan Archdiocese of Salisbury
- June 25, 1982: Renamed as the Apostolic Prefecture of Chinhoyi
- October 28, 1985: Established as the Diocese of Chinhoyi

== Leadership ==
- Prefect Apostolic of Chinhoyi (Roman rite)
  - Bishop Helmut Reckter, S.J. (22 Feb 1974 – 28 Oct 1985); see below
- Bishops of Chinhoyi (Roman rite)
  - Bishop Helmut Reckter, S.J. (28 Oct 1985 – 10 Mar 2004); see above
  - Bishop Dieter Bernd Scholz S.J. (6 April 2006 – 17 Feb 2016), retired
    - Apostolic Administrator Robert Ndlovu (17 Feb 2016 – 7 April 2018)
  - Bishop Raymond Tapiwa Mupandasekwa C.Ss.R. (30 Dec 2017 – 15 Sep 2023), appointed Bishop of Masvingo
    - Apostolic Administrator Raymond Tapiwa Mupandasekwa, C.Ss.R. (15 Sep 2023 – Present)
  - Bishop Patrick Ngwenya (11 Apr 2026 – Present)

== See also ==
- Roman Catholicism in Zimbabwe

== Sources ==
- GCatholic.org
- "Diocese of Chinhoyi". Catholic-Hierarchy.org. David M. Cheney.
