= Diocese of Mutare =

Roman Catholic diocese in Zimbabwe

Diocese of Mutare Dioecesis Mutarensis
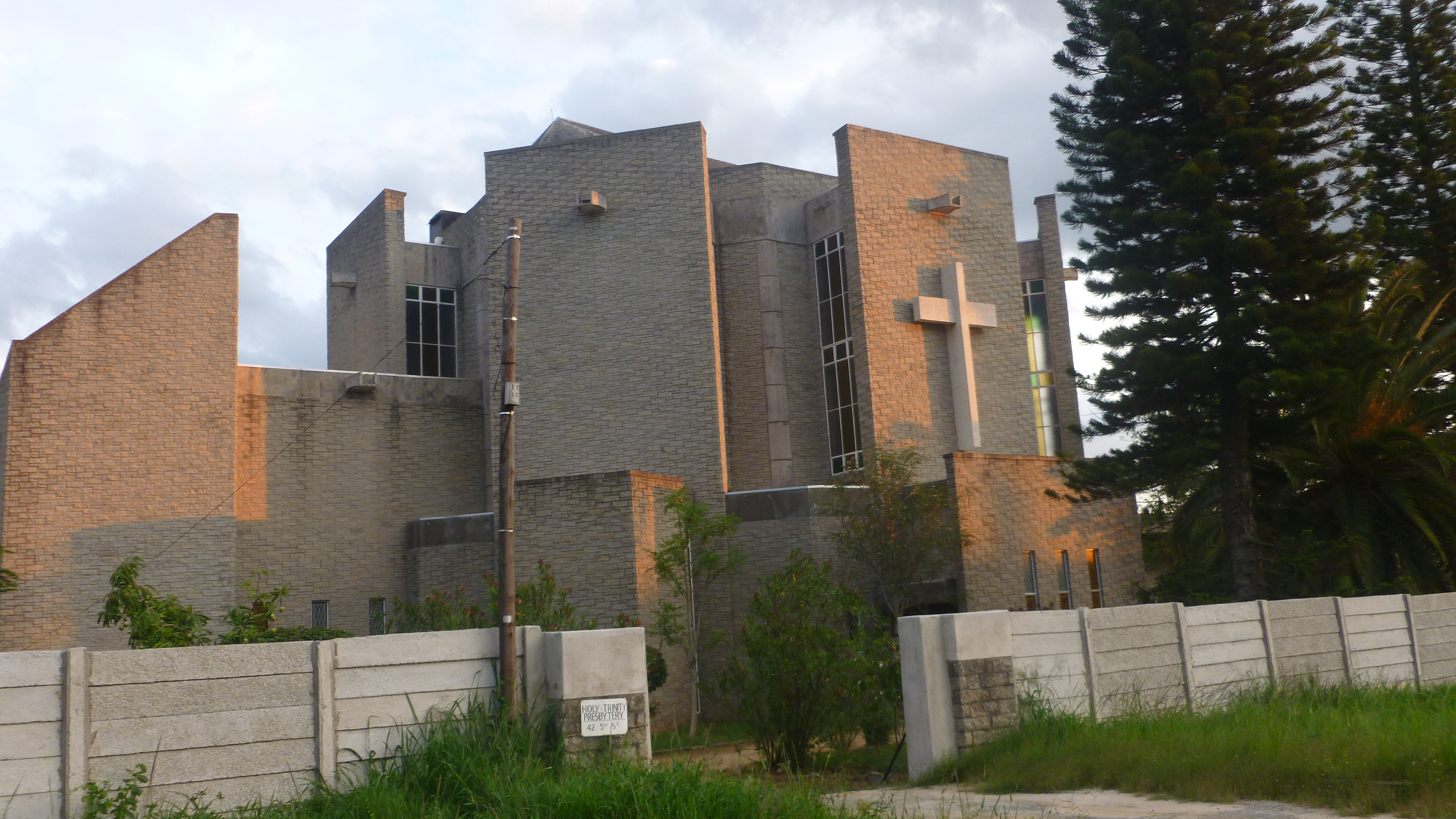
- Holy Trinity Cathedral

Location
- Country: Zimbabwe
- Territory: Districts of Maungwe, Mutasa, Mutare, Nyanga, Chimanimani, Chipinge
- Ecclesiastical province: Harare
- Deaneries: Mutasa, Rusape, Nyanga
- Headquarters: Mutare
- Coordinates: 18°58′32″S 32°41′35″E

Statistics
- Area: 32,202 km^{2} (12,433 sq mi)
- Population: Total; Catholics: (as of 2016); 2,321,000; 231,500 (10%)
- Parishes: 30
- Schools: 42

Information
- Denomination: Roman Catholic
- Rite: Latin Rite
- Established: February 15, 1957
- Cathedral: Holy Trinity
- Patron saint: Our Lady of Mount Carmel

Current leadership
- Pope: Leo XIV
- Bishop: Paul Horan O. Carm.
- Metropolitan Archbishop: Robert Christopher Ndlovu
- Vicar General: Father Ambrose Chagongonyeka Vinyu

Map
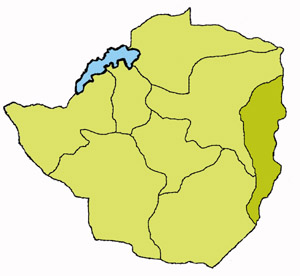

Website
- www.mutarediocese.co.zw

The Roman Catholic Diocese of Mutare (Latin: Mutaren(sis)) is a suffragan diocese in eastern Zimbabwe. It includes the city of Mutare and is part of the ecclesiastical province of Harare.

== History ==
- February 2, 1953: Established as Apostolic Prefecture of Umtali from the Apostolic Vicariate of Fort Victoria and Apostolic Vicariate of Salisbury
- February 15, 1957: Promoted as Diocese of Umtali
- June 25, 1982: Renamed as Diocese of Mutare

== Bishops ==
=== Prefect Apostolic of Umtali ===
1. Donal Lamont, OCarm (6 February 1953 – 15 February 1957)

=== Bishops of Umtali ===
1. Donal Lamont, OCarm (15 February 1957 – 5 November 1981)
2. Alexio Churu Muchabaiwa (5 November 1981 – 25 June 1982)

=== Bishops of Mutare ===
1. Alexio Churu Muchabaiwa (25 June 1982 – 27 August 2016)
2. Paul Horan, O.Carm. (27 August 2016 – )

=== Auxiliary bishop ===
- Patrick Mumbure Mutume (17 June 1979 – 8 February 2017)

== See also ==
- Catholic Church in Zimbabwe
- List of Catholic dioceses in Zimbabwe
