= Diocese of Hwange =

Latin Catholic diocese in Zimbabwe

Coordinates: 18.3667°S 26.5056°E

Diocese of Hwange Dioecesis Huangensis

Location
- Country: Zimbabwe
- Territory: Civil districts of Hwange, Binga, and the part of Lupane north of the Shabula river
- Ecclesiastical province: Bulawayo

Statistics
- Area: 43,427 km^{2} (16,767 sq mi)
- Population: Total; Catholics: (as of 2016); 406,500; 38,234 (9.4%)
- Parishes: 24
- Schools: 7

Information
- Denomination: Catholic Church
- Sui iuris church: Latin Church
- Rite: Roman Rite
- Established: March 1, 1963
- Secular priests: 21

Current leadership
- Pope: Leo XIV
- Bishop: Raphael Macebo Mabuza Ncube
- Metropolitan Archbishop: Alex Kaliyanil, SVD
- Vicar General: Marko Rumuma
- Bishops emeritus: José Alberto Serrano Antón, I.E.M.E.

Map
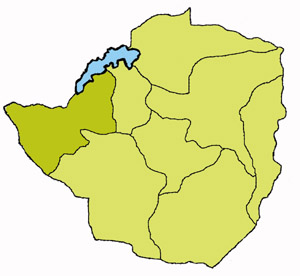

The Diocese of Hwange (Latin: Huangen(sis)) is a Latin Catholic suffragan diocese in the city of Hwange in the ecclesiastical province of Bulawayo in Zimbabwe.

== History ==
- June 29, 1953: Established as Apostolic Prefecture of Wankie from the Apostolic Vicariate of Bulawayo and Apostolic Vicariate of Salisbury
- March 1, 1963: Promoted as Diocese of Wankie
- April 8, 1988: Renamed as Diocese of Hwange

== Leadership ==
Prefects Apostolic of Wankie

- Francesco Font Garcia, I.E.M.E. (1953 – 1956)
- Dominic Ros Arraiza, I.E.M.E. (19 October 1956 – 1963)

Bishops of Hwange

- Ignacio Prieto Vega, I.E.M.E. (1 March 1963 – 9 February 1999)
- Robert Christopher Ndlovu (9 February 1999 – 10 June 2004), appointed Archbishop of Harare
- Alberto Serrano, I.E.M.E. (5 December 2006 – 5 July 2021)
- Raphael Macebo Mabuza Ncube (5 July 2021 – present)

== See also ==
- Catholic Church in Zimbabwe

== Sources ==
- GCatholic.org
- "Diocese of Hwange". Catholic-Hierarchy.org. David M. Cheney.
