= Catholic Church in Zimbabwe =

Part of worldwide Catholic Church, led by Pope Leo XIV

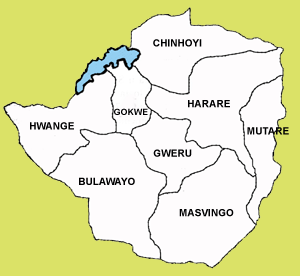
- Zimbabwean Diocese' boundaries. Harare and Bulawayo are metropolitan Archdiocese
- Type: National polity
- Classification: Catholic
- Orientation: Latin
- Scripture: Bible
- Theology: Catholic theology
- Polity: Episcopal
- Governance: Zimbabwe Catholic Bishops' Conference
- Pope: Leo XIV
- ZCBC President: Raymond Mupandasekwa
- Apostolic Nuncio: Paolo Rudelli
- Region: Zimbabwe
- Language: English, Shona, Ndebele
- Founder: Jesuits
- Origin: 1887
- Members: 975,488 (2022 census)
- Official website: http://www.zcbc.co.zw/

The Catholic Church in Zimbabwe is part of the worldwide Catholic Church, under the spiritual leadership of the Pope of Rome, Pope Leo XIV.

According to the 2017 Inter Censal Demography Survey by the Zimbabwe National Statistics Agency 8.0% of the population of Zimbabwe were Catholic; overall, 84% of the country had a Christian background.

There were 1,145,000 Catholics in the country (about 9% of the total population) in 2005. According to the 2022 Zimbabwe Population and Housing census, there are an estimated 975.488 Catholics in Zimbabwe, representing 6.4% from Zimbabwe's population.

In 2020, Catholic numbers were up to 2 million people, with 600 priests and 1,000 nuns serving across 267 parishes.

Pius Ncube, the former archbishop of Bulawayo, was an outspoken critic of the then government of Robert Mugabe, who was also a Catholic.

== Dioceses ==
- Harare
  - Chinhoyi
  - Gokwe
  - Mutare
- Bulawayo
  - Gweru
  - Hwange
  - Masvingo

== See also ==
- Religion in Zimbabwe
- Christianity in Zimbabwe
- Archdiocese of Bulawayo
- List of parishes in the Archdiocese of Harare
- List of Catholic dioceses in Zimbabwe
- Archbishop Marek Zalewski
