= Diocese of Gweru =

Latin Catholic diocese in Zimbabwe

Diocese of Gweru Dioecesis Gueruensis

Location
- Country: Zimbabwe
- Territory: Civil districts of Gweru, Kwekwe, Shurugwi, Chirumhanzu, Zvishavane, Mberengwa
- Ecclesiastical province: Bulawayo

Statistics
- Area: 29,158 km^{2} (11,258 sq mi)
- Population: Total; Catholics: (as of 2016); 2,428,000; 443,500 (18.3%)
- Parishes: 33
- Schools: 23

Information
- Denomination: Catholic Church
- Sui iuris church: Latin Church
- Rite: Roman Rite
- Established: January 1, 1955
- Patron saint: Mary Help of Christians
- Secular priests: 29

Current leadership
- Pope: Leo XIV
- Bishop: Rudolf Nyandoro
- Vicar General: Father Matthew Madziva

Map
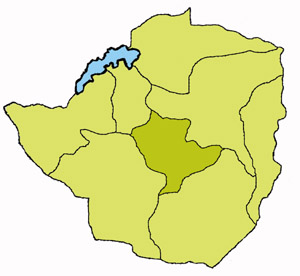

The Diocese of Gweru (Latin: Gueruen(sis)) is a Latin Catholic suffragan diocese in the city of Gweru in the ecclesiastical province of Bulawayo in Zimbabwe.

== History ==
- November 14, 1946: Established as Apostolic Prefecture of Fort Victoria
- June 24, 1950: Promoted as Apostolic Vicariate of Fort Victoria
- January 1, 1955: Promoted as Diocese of Gwelo
- June 25, 1982: Renamed as Diocese of Gweru

== Episcopal ordinaries ==
(all Latin Church)

=== Prefects Apostolic of Fort Victoria ===
1. Aloysius Haene (1947 – 24 June 1950)

=== Vicars Apostolic of Fort Victoria ===
1. Aloysius Haene (24 June 1950 – 1 January 1955)

=== Bishops of Gwelo ===
1. Aloysius Haene (1 January 1955 – 3 February 1977)
2. Tobias Wunganayi Chiginya (3 February 1977 – 25 June 1982)

=== Bishops of Gweru ===
1. Tobias Wunganayi Chiginya (25 June 1982 – 14 January 1987)
2. Francis Xavier Mugadzi (25 October 1988 – 6 February 2004)
3. Martin Munyanyi (11 May 2006 – 28 April 2012)
4. Xavier Johnsai Munyongani (14 September 2013 – 15 October 2017) (was priest here, 1977–1999, then was incardinated in Díocese of Masvingo)
5. Rudolf Nyandoro (24 October 2020 – present)

== See also ==
- Catholic Church in Zimbabwe

== Sources ==
- GCatholic.org
- "Diocese of Gweru". Catholic-Hierarchy.org. David M. Cheney.
