= 1979 in literature =

This article contains information about the literary events and publications of 1979.

== Events ==
- May – The Merchant Ivory Productions film The Europeans is released. Its screenplay by Ruth Prawer Jhabvala draws on the 1878 Henry James novel of the same name.
- October 25 – The London Review of Books is first issued, its founding editors being Karl Miller, Mary-Kay Wilmers and Susannah Clapp. For its first six months it appears as an insert to The New York Review of Books.
- November – Dambudzo Marechera's The House of Hunger wins the Guardian Fiction Prize.
- unknown dates
  - K. W. Jeter's novel Morlock Night pioneers full-length fiction in the genre he later calls steampunk.
  - August Wilson's Jitney is first produced; it becomes the eighth in his "Pittsburgh Cycle".

== New books ==
=== Fiction ===
- Douglas Adams – The Hitchhiker's Guide to the Galaxy
- V. C. Andrews – Flowers in the Attic
- Jeffrey Archer – Kane and Abel
- Barbara Taylor Bradford – A Woman of Substance
- Octavia Butler – Kindred
- Italo Calvino — If on a winter's night a traveler
- Orson Scott Card – A Planet Called Treason
- Angela Carter – The Bloody Chamber
- Eileen Chang – Lust, Caution
- Agatha Christie – Miss Marple's Final Cases and Two Other Stories
- L. Sprague de Camp and Lin Carter – Conan the Liberator
- Michael Ende – The Neverending Story (Die unendliche Geschichte)
- José Pablo Feinmann – Últimos días de la víctima
- Alan Dean Foster – Alien (movie novelization)
- Carlo Fruttero and Franco Lucentini — A che punto è la notte
- Brian Garfield – The Paladin
- William Golding – Darkness Visible
- William Goldman – Tinsel
- Nadine Gordimer – Burger's Daughter
- Arthur Hailey – Overload
- Stratis Haviaras – When the Tree Sings
- Douglas Hill – Galactic Warlord
- Stephen King – The Dead Zone
- Russell Kirk – The Princess of All Lands
- Milan Kundera – The Book of Laughter and Forgetting (first published in French as Le Livre du rire et de l'oubli)
- John le Carré – Smiley's People
- Morgan Llywelyn – Lion of Ireland: The Legend of Brian Boru
- Robert Ludlum – The Matarese Circle
- Norman Mailer – The Executioner's Song
- Cormac McCarthy – Suttree
- Roger McDonald – 1915: a novel
- Haruki Murakami – Hear the Wind Sing (風の歌を聴け, Kaze no uta o kike)
- Ellis Peters – One Corpse Too Many
- Jerry Pournelle – Janissaries
- Satyajit Ray – Hatyapuri
- Harold Robbins – Memories of Another Day
- Philip Roth – The Ghost Writer
- Scott Spencer – Endless Love
- Mary Stewart – The Last Enchantment
- Peter Straub – Ghost Story
- William Styron – Sophie's Choice
- Trevanian – Shibumi
- Kaari Utrio – Rautalilja
- Jack Vance – The Face
- Kurt Vonnegut – Jailbird
- Elizabeth Walter – In the Mist and Other Uncanny Encounters
- William Wharton – Birdy
- Kit Williams – Masquerade
- Raymond Williams – The Fight for Manod
- Robert Anton Wilson – Schrodinger's Cat
- Tom Wolfe – The Right Stuff
- Roger Zelazny – Roadmarks

=== Children and young people ===
- Chris Van Allsburg – The Garden of Abdul Gasazi
- Katharine Mary Briggs (with Anne Yvonne Gilbert) – Abbey Lubbers, Banshees, & Boggarts: An Illustrated Encyclopedia of Fairies
- Raymond Briggs – Fungus the Bogeyman
- Roald Dahl – The Twits
- Colin Dann – The Animals of Farthing Wood
- Peter Dickinson (with Wayne Anderson) – The Flight of Dragons
- Gordon Korman – Go Jump in the Pool
- Elizabeth Laird – Rosy's Garden
- Robie Macauley – A Secret History of Time to Come
- Robert Munsch – Mud Puddle
- Bill Peet – Cowardly Clyde
- Daniel Pinkwater
  - Alan Mendelsohn, the Boy from Mars
  - Yobgorgle: Mystery Monster of Lake Ontario
- Ellen Raskin – The Westing Game
- Jane Severance (with Tea Schook) – When Megan Went Away
- Barbara Sleigh – Carbonel and Calidor
- Angela Sommer-Bodenburg – Der kleine Vampir
- Rosemary Wells – Max & Ruby

=== Drama ===
- Bahram Beyzai – Death of Yazdgerd (مرگ یزدگرد)
- Caryl Churchill – Cloud Nine
- David Fennario – Balconville
- Richard Harris – Outside Edge
- Elfriede Jelinek – Was geschah, nachdem Nora ihren Mann verlassen hatte; oder Stützen der Gesellschaften (What Occurred after Nora Left her Husband, or Supports of Society)
- Heiner Müller – Hamletmachine (first performance)
- Mark Medoff – Children of a Lesser God
- Neil Oram – The Warp
- Peter Shaffer – Amadeus
- Sam Shepard – Buried Child
- Martin Sherman – Bent
- Tom Stoppard – Undiscovered Country

=== Poetry ===
- Kingsley Amis – Collected Poems

=== Non-fiction ===
- Alison Adburgham – Shopping in Style: London from the Restoration to Edwardian Elegance
- David Attenborough – Life on Earth
- Harold Walter Bailey – Dictionary of Khotan Saka
- Ion Biberi – Lumea de azi (World of Today)
- Jerome Bruner – On Knowing: Essays for the Left Hand
- L. Sprague de Camp (editor) – The Blade of Conan
- Joan Didion – The White Album
- Elizabeth Eisenstein – The Printing Press as an Agent of Change
- Peter Evans – The Music of Benjamin Britten
- John Fowles – The Tree
- Sandra Gilbert and Susan Gubar – The Madwoman in the Attic: The Woman Writer and the Nineteenth-Century Literary Imagination
- Eloise Greenfield, Lessie Jones Little, Pattie Ridley Jones – Childtimes: A Three-Generation Memoir
- Douglas Hofstadter – Gödel, Escher, Bach: An Eternal Golden Braid
- Henry Kissinger – The White House Years
- Leon Litwack – Been in the Storm So Long: The Aftermath of Slavery
- Jean-François Lyotard – The Postmodern Condition: A Report on Knowledge (La Condition postmoderne: rapport sur le savoir)
- Jessica Mitford – Poison Penmanship: the Gentle Art of Muckraking
- Stephen Pile – The Book of Heroic Failures
- Clark Ashton Smith – The Black Book of Clark Ashton Smith
- Margaret Trudeau – Beyond Reason
- Tom Wolfe – The Right Stuff

== Births ==
- February 4 – Ben Lerner, American poet, novelist and critic
- February 10 – Johan Harstad, Norwegian novelist
- February 27 - Alexander Gordon Smith, British children's and young-adult author
- March 28 – Benjamin Percy, American short story writer
- April 14 – Patrick Somerville, American novelist and short story writer
- May 21 - James Clancy Phelan, American young-adult and thriller writer
- June 28 – Florian Zeller, French novelist and dramatist
- July 14 – Yukiko Motoya, Japanese fiction writer, playwright, theatre director and voice actress
- August 14 - Sayaka Murata, Japanese novelist
- unknown dates
  - D.D. Johnston, Scottish political novelist and university lecturer
  - Emily St. John Mandel, Canadian-born novelist

== Deaths ==
- January – Dilys Cadwaladr, Welsh-language poet (born 1902)
- January 27 – Victoria Ocampo, Argentine publisher, writer and critic (born 1890)
- February 9 – Allen Tate, American poet and essayist (born 1899)
- February 25 – John L. Wasserman, American entertainment critic (car accident, born 1938)
- February 27 – Sir George Clark, English historian (born 1890)
- March 26 – Jean Stafford, American short story writer and novelist (heart failure; born 1915)
- April 8 – Breece D'J Pancake, American short story writer (suicide, born 1952)
- May 10 – J. B. Morton (Beachcomber), English humorous newspaper columnist (born 1893)
- May 14 – Jean Rhys, Dominica-born English novelist (born 1890)
- June 1 – Eric Partridge, New Zealand/British lexicographer (born 1894)
- June 3 – Arno Schmidt, German novelist (born 1914)
- June 7 – Forrest Carter, American genre novelist (heart failure, born 1925)
- July 6 – Malcolm Hulke, English television writer (born 1924)
- July 7 – Ahmad Qandil, Saudi Arabian poet (born 1911)
- July 15 – Juana de Ibarbourou, Uruguayan poet (born 1892)
- July 21 – Eugène Vinaver, Russian-born English literary scholar (born 1899)
- July 23 – Joseph Kessel, French journalist and novelist (born 1898)
- July 24 - Edward Stachura, Polish writer (born 1937)
- July 29 – Herbert Marcuse, German Jewish philosopher (born 1898)
- August 8 – Nicholas Monsarrat, English novelist (born 1910)
- August 16 – Jerzy Jurandot (Jerzy Glejgewicht), Polish poet and dramatist (born 1911)
- August 20 – Christian Dotremont, Belgian painter and writer (born 1922)
- August 22 – James T. Farrell, American novelist (born 1904)
- September 5 – John Bradburne, English poet and missionary (killed by guerillas; born 1921)
- September 6 – Guy Bolton, British playwright (born 1884)
- September 25 – Zhou Libo (周立波), Chinese novelist and translator (born 1908)
- October 6 – Elizabeth Bishop, American poet (born 1911)
- October 17 – S. J. Perelman, American humorist (born 1904)
- October 18 – Virgilio Piñera, Cuban poet and short-story writer (born 1912)
- December 12 – Goronwy Rees, Welsh journalist and academic (born 1909)
- December 19 – Donald Creighton, Canadian historian (born 1902)

== Awards ==
- Nobel Prize for Literature: Odysseus Elytis

=== Canada ===
- See 1979 Governor General's Awards for a complete list of winners and finalists for those awards.

=== France ===
- Prix Goncourt: Antonine Maillet, Pélagie-la-Charrette
- Prix Médicis:
  - French: Claude Durand, La Nuit zoologique
  - International: Alejo Carpentier, La harpe et l'ombre

=== Spain ===
- Miguel de Cervantes Prize: Jorge Luis Borges and Gerardo Diego

=== United Kingdom ===
- Booker Prize: Penelope Fitzgerald, Offshore
- Carnegie Medal for children's literature: Peter Dickinson, Tulku
- Cholmondeley Award:
- Guardian Fiction Prize: Neil Jordan, Night in Tunisia and Dambudzo Marechera, The House of Hunger
- James Tait Black Memorial Prize:
  - Fiction: William Golding, Darkness Visible
  - Biography: Brian Finney, Christopher Isherwood: A Critical Biography

=== United States ===
- American Academy of Arts and Letters Gold Medal for Fiction:
- Nebula Award: Vonda N. McIntyre, Dreamsnake
- Hugo Award:
  - Best Novel: Vonda N. McIntyre, Dreamsnake
  - Best Novella: John Varley, The Persistence of Vision
- Locus Award for Best Novel: Vonda N. McIntyre, Dreamsnake
- Bancroft Prize:
  - Christopher Thorne, Allies of a Kind: The United States, Britain, and the War Against Japan, 1941–1945
  - Anthony F. C. Wallace, Rockdale: The Growth of An American Village in the Early Industrial Revolution
- Pulitzer Prize:
  - Drama: Sam Shepard, Buried Child
  - Biography or Autobiography: Leonard Baker, Days of Sorrow and Pain: Leo Baeck and the Berlin Jews
  - Fiction: John Cheever, The Stories of John Cheever
  - Poetry: Robert Penn Warren, Now and Then: Poems 1976–1978
  - History: Don E. Fehrenbacher, The Dred Scott Case: Its Significance in American Law and Politics
  - General Nonfiction: E. O. Wilson, On Human Nature

=== Elsewhere ===
- Friedenspreis des Deutschen Buchhandels: Yehudi Menuhin
- Miles Franklin Award: David Ireland, A Woman of the Future
- Premio Nadal: Carlos Rojas, El ingenioso hidalgo y poeta Federico García Lorca asciende a los infiernos
- Viareggio Prize: Giorgio Manganelli, Centuria
