= St Gerards Borrowdale Parish =

St Gerard's Catholic Church
- St Gerards Borrowdale Parish
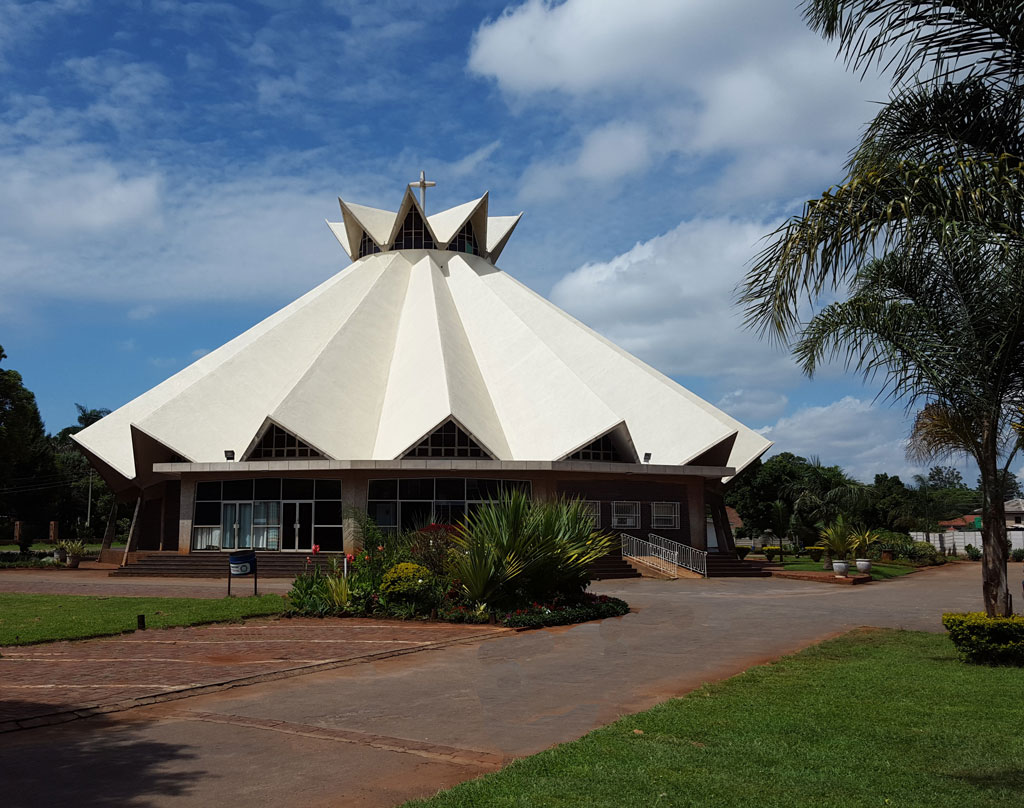
- Borrowdale Parish
- Location: 6 Stonechat Lane Greystone Park Borrowdale Harare
- Country: Zimbabwe
- Denomination: Roman Catholic
- Tradition: Latin Rite
- Religious institute: Congregation of the Most Holy Redeemer

History
- Consecrated: 1960

Architecture
- Years built: 1972

Specifications
- Capacity: 500

Administration
- Province: Harare
- Archdiocese: Archdiocese of Harare
- Deanery: Inner City Deanery
- Parish: St Gerard's

Clergy
- Archbishop: Robert Ndlovu
- Pastor(s): 1. Fr. Byrne, Manyenga C.Ss.R; 2. Fr. Chikuni, Mark C.Ss.R; 3. Fr. Hama, George C.Ss.R

St Gerards Catholic Church is the first Redemptorist church to be constructed in Zimbabwe. St Gerard's Catholic Catholic Church is situated in Borrowdale, Greystone Park in Harare, Zimbabwe. The church is styled on the circular cathedral in Liverpool except that it is smaller.

== History ==
It was in 1959 when Fr Gerald Hughes, C.Ss.R, who was the Provincial Superior of the Redemptorists in London, got a request from Archbishop Framcis Markall SJ to come and work in the Archdiocese of Harare. When the request came the Redemptorists who were already in South Africa, began to plan to come to Zimbabwe. This eventually became a reality in 1960 when Fr Gerald Hughes sent out Fr Phillip Foster and Fr Antony Pathe to Zimbabwe (Rhodesia). They arrived in August 1959. The Redemptorists at the time where very much interested in coming to work in Harare precisely because they felt that through living and working in this place they would be very close to fulfilling the very reason why the Congregation was founded – service of the marginalised poor. When they were given the parish of St Gerard it was not always affluent, but a farming community. Therefore, they were not only serving the elite white community but also the marginalised black community that lived in the farms as farm labourers. At the time, there were very few schools available for the farm labourers children. Therefore, the Redemptorists were the first to put up makeshift schools for these children and to teach them formal education in the parish of St Gerard's. This was eventually stopped by the Smith regime, the white government at that time putting an end the Redemptorist's desire to spread the good news through the ministry of education.

== Parish Ministry ==
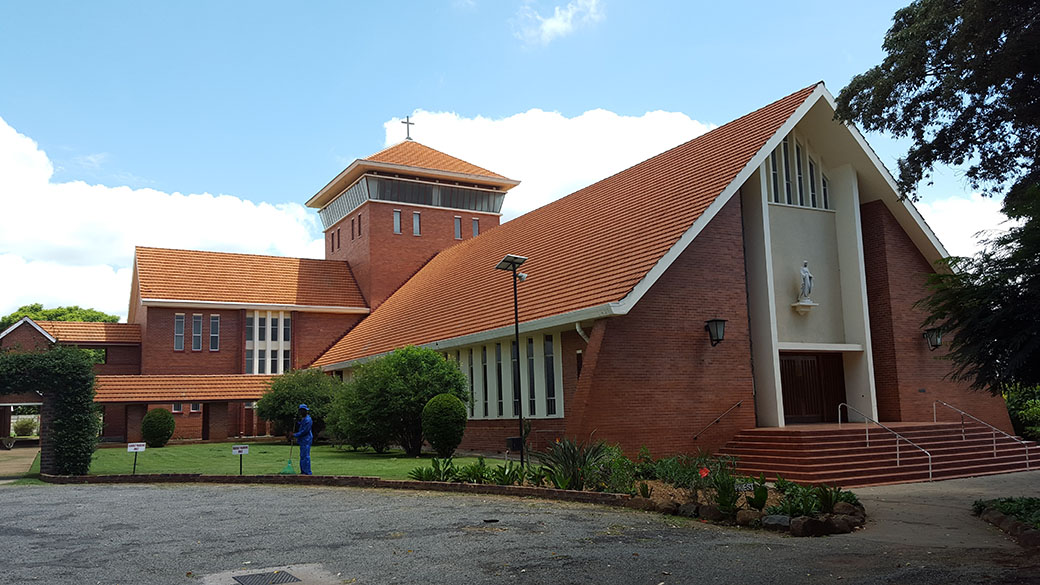
Church of the Immaculate Conception

St Gerards Parish church serves Greystone Park, Glen Lorne, Borrowdale, Borrowdale Brooke, Pomona, Vainona, Colray, Philadelphia, Quinnington.

St Gerard's Parish serves 2 subparishes

1. Church of the Immaculate Conception Highlands sub parish (in the image) in the grounds of Nazareth House.This sub parish serves Highlands, Chisipite, Lewisam, Colne Valley, Rolf Valley, The Grange, Glen Lorne, Mandara and parts of Greendale.
2. St Cecilia Charlotte Brooke

== Mass Times ==
1. 08:00 English Mass
2. 10:00 Shona Mass

== Notable works ==
St Augustines Hatcliffe Parish Former Sub parish which is presently an independent fully fledged parish.
