= List of parishes in the Archdiocese of Harare =

List of churches in the Archdiocese of Harare. There is a total of 59 parishes across 12 Deanery's. The youngest parish is St Stephens Dzivarasekwa becoming a fully fledged parish in January 2019.

== Inner City Deanery ==
Parishes located in Inner City Deanery of Harare Archdiocese .

Parish	Location	Founded	Orientation	Sub Parishes	Outstations or Mass Centers	Other Details
Cathedral	Central business district	1891	Jesuit Parish until 2009(84 years) Diocesan Parish (2009–present)			
St Gerards Borrowdale	Borrowdale Greystone Park	1960	Entrusted to Redemptorists	1. Immaculate Conception-(Nazareth House) Highlands; 2. St Cecilia Charlotte Brooke		
Holy Name Mabelreign	Mabelreign Cotswold Hills	1957	Jesuit Parish until 2019 (61 years) Diocesan Parish (2019–present)		Inkomo1, Parachute Regiment, Royden Farm, Tynwald North.	
St Canisius Marlborough	Marlborough	1998	Jesuit Parish until 2013 (15 years) Diocesan Parish (2013–present)		Glenara Estate, Gwebi College, Lowdale, Mt. Hampden, Nyabira, Robrick.	Separated from Holy Name Mabelreign in 2013
Our Lady of the Wayside	Mt Pleasant	1959	Entrusted to Jesuits	1. St John of Cologne Avondale	Emarald Hill Children's Home, St Anne Christon Bank.	
Assumption of Our Lady Rhodesville	Rhodesville Greendale	1953	Diocesan Parish	1. St John Msasa		
St Augustines Hatcliffe	Hatcliffe	1998	Entrusted to Redemptorists			Separated from St Gerards Borrowdale in 2018

Inner City Deanery also has a famous choir called Inner City Deanery Choir.

== North West Of City Deanery ==
Parishes located in North West of City Deanery. North West was separated from South West of City Deanery. North West of City Deanery choir is formerly known as South West 2 choir as well.

Parish	Location	Founded	Orientation	Sub parishes	Oustations or Mass Centers	Other details
St Stephen's Dzivarasekwa	Dzivarasekwa	1975	Entrusted to the Jesuits	St Ignatius of Loyola Dzivarasekwa Extension	Stapleford, Inkomo Barracks, Rainham.	Separated from Holy Name Mabelreign and left Inner City Deanery (2019)
All Saints Kambuzuma	Kambuzuma	1967	Entrusted to the Salesians of Don Bosco			
Holy Trinity Kuwadzana	Kuwadzana	1991	Entrusted to the Spiritans			
St Henry Rugare	Rugare	1973	Entrusted to the Spiritans			
Immaculate Heart of Mary Snake Park	Snake Park	2010	Entrusted to the Spiritans			
St Clara Warren Park	Warren Park	1986	Entrusted to the Spiritans			
Uganda Martyrs Mukafose	Mufakose	1965	Diocesan Parish	St Barnabas Granary and Ascension of our Lord, Rydle Ridge		

== South West Of City Deanery ==
Parishes located in South West of City Deanery . Holy Cross Budiriro the largest parish in the Archdiocese of Harare is in this deanery. South West of City Deanery is another famous choir

Parish	Location	Founded	Orientation	Sub parishes	Oustations or Mass Centers
Holy Cross Budiriro	Budiriro	1990	Entrusted to the Verbites		Mother Theresa Centre(CABS).
St Patrick's Glen Norah	Glen Norah	1978	Entrusted to the Franciscans		
St Matthew's Glen View	Glen View	1986	Entrusted to the Franciscans		
The Immaculate Conception & Our Lady of Lourdes New Highfield	New Highfield	1971	Diocesan Parish		
Mary Queen of Peace Highfield	Old Highfield	1945	Diocesan Parish	St. Clare Chiedza Southerton 2000	

== Outer City Deanery ==
Parishes located in Outer City Deanery of Harare Archdiocese .

Parish	Location	Founded	Orientation	Sub Parishes
St Ignatius Chishawasha	Chishawasha	1892	Entrusted to the Jesuits	
St Fidelis Mabvuku	Mabvuku	1952	Entrusted to the Redemptorist	
St Charles Lwanga Ruwa	Ruwa		Entrusted to the Claretians	
St Dominic Zimre Park	Riverside	2019	Entrusted to the Claretians	
St. Alphonsus Ligouri Tafara	Tafara	1969	Entrusted to the Redemptorists	

== South East of City Deanery ==
Parishes located in South East Deanery of Harare Archdiocese .

Parish	Location	Founded	Orientation	Sub Parishes	Outstations/Mass Centers
St Francis Xavier Braeside	Braeside	1958	Jesuit Parish until 2019 (61years) Diocesan Parish	St Martins Cranborne (1986)	
St Peter's Mbare (St Peter the Apostle[1910]) (St Peter Claver [1964])	Mbare	1910	Entrusted to the Jesuits		
St Peter's Mbare (St Peter the Apostle[1910]) (St Peter Claver [1964])	Mbare	1964	Entrusted to the Jesuits		
St Josephs Hatfield	Hatfield	1960	Entrusted to the Carmelites		St Patrick's Epworth, St Pius, Manyame Air Base.
St Francis of Assisi Waterfalls	Waterfalls	1958	Entrusted to the Franciscans		

== Chitungwiza Deanery ==
Parishes located in Chitungwiza Deanery of Harare Archdiocese .

Parish	Location	Founded	Orientation	Sub Parishes	Outstations or Mass centers
St Alois Hunyani	Hunyani	1962	Entrusted to the Carmelites		
Seke Rural	Seke	No data	Diocesan Parish		Besa, Charakupa, Chitsvedemo, Madamombe, Manyenga, Mudhe, Ndamuka, Njuma, St Hugh's Ushewokunze, St James, Shiri,
St Monica Seke Urban	Seke	1983	Diocesan Parish	St Davids	
St Theresa Seke Urban	Seke	?	Served by St Monica Seke Urban (Diocesan)		
St Agnes Zengeza	Zengeza	1981	Entrusted to the Carmelites		

== East Deanery ==
Parishes located in East Deanery of Harare Archdiocese .

Parish	Location	Founded	Orientation	Sub Parishes	Outstations or Mass Centers
Holy Cross Murewa	Murewa	1962	Diocesan Parish		Borere, Bunhu, Chinau, Chimurenga, Chipinda, Chingwaru, Chinyemba, Chinzara, Chitate, Chitimbe, Chitowa 1, 2, 3, Chitsungo, Chivake, Dandara, Dindi, Goso, Gwangadza, Gwishiri, Holy Cross, Kaseke, Katiyo, Kushinga, Madamombe, Magaya, Magudu, Majasi, Manyika, Maponongwe, Maramba, Marembera, Matututu, Maziyanike, Mukarakate, Muava, Munemo, Mupaya, Muswe, Mutowani, Nyakiwa, Nyakasoro, Nyanzou, Resettlement Area, Rukariro, Rukungawe, Sakutukwa, Village 9, Zhombe, Zvomuya.
St Pauls Musami	Musami	1923	Entrusted to the Jesuits		Chizanga, Chanetsa, Zvomuya, Nherera, Mushinga, Shamu, Chemhondoro, Mabika, Shangure, Mavudzi, Chidhau, Dewe, Mwanza, Nhora, Chikupo, Gezi, Chinhoyi, Chikwati, Munamba, Bango, Bora, Manjonjo, Mareko, Rota, Kadenge, Ruka, 35 Mile Peg, Chamachinda, Sabas, Dzvete.
All Souls Mutoko	Mutoko	1930	Diocesan Parish	1. John Paul II Mutoko Center	Chimoyo, Chingwena, Chipfiko, Dhuku Dam, Gozi, Karonga, Katavinya, Katsukunya, Kaunye, Kondo, Laury Farm, Makosa, Manhemba, Maremba, Marira, Masarakufa, Matedza, Mushimbo, Muchina, Mutambwe, Nyahondo, Nyakuchena, Nyamande, Nyamashuka, Nyamaruka, Nyamuziwe, Shiga, Tsiku

== North Deanery ==
Parishes located in North Deanery of Harare Archdiocese .

Parish	Location	Founded	Orientation	Sub Parishes	Outstations Or Mass centers
Holy Family Bindura	Bindura	1952	Diocesan Parish	1. Kristo Mambo Chipadze; 2. Sacred Heart of Mary Mazowe	
The Visitation BVM Makumbi	Makumbi	1924	Entrusted to the Jesuits	1. Masembura; 2. Mhumhurwi; 3. Musami; 4. Parirehwa	
Holy Rosary Mvurwi	Mvurwi	1954	Diocesan Parish		Mukasa, Holland Farm, Nzimbo, Majome, Musarara, Nyachuru, Kanyembe, Belrock, Rosa, Gunguhwe, Nyakudya, Muchirikuenda, Marongwe, Jaji, Bhobho, Bare, Kanhukamwe, Madombwe, Chaora, Goteka, Earlijg Farm, Bright Farm, Musarara, Nyachuru, Muchirikuenda, Goteka,

== West Deanery ==
Parishes located in West Deanery of Harare Archdiocese .

Parish	Location	Founded	Orientation	Sub Parishes
St Francis Chegutu	Chegutu	?	Diocesan Parish	1. St Martin de Porres Martindale
St James the Greater Kadoma	Kadoma	1914	Diocesan Parish	1. St Charles Lwanga Ngezi
St Mary's Rimuka	Kadoma		Diocesan Parish	
St Michaels Mhondoro	Mhondoro	1925	Diocesan Parish	
St Dominics Mubayira	Mubayira	?	Entrusted to the Verbites	
St Matiya Kalemba Norton	Norton	?	Diocesan Parish	
St Joseph Sanyati	Sanyati	?	Diocesan Parish	

== Marondera Deanery ==
Parishes located in Marondera Deanery of Harare Archdiocese .

Parish	Location	Founded	Orientation	Sub Parishes
Mufudzi Wakanaka Dombotombo	Dombotombo	1994	Diocesan Parish	
St Joseph Nyazema	Macheke	1998	Severed by Mufudzi Wakanaka Dombotombo	
Our Lady of the Rosary Marondera	Marondera	1952	Diocesan Parish	
Mt St Mary's Wedza	Wedza	1951	Diocesan Parish	

== Chivhu Deanery ==
Parishes located in Chivhu Deanery

Parish	Location	Founded	Orientation	Sub Parishes
Our Lady of Lourdes Chivhu	Chivhu	1940	Served by Nharira	
St Antony Gandachibvuva	Chivhu	1962	Entrusted to the Franciscans	1. St Patricks Masasa; 2. St Clare's Sadza
Dorowa	Dorowa	?	?	
St Francis of Assisi Nharira	Nharira	1963	Entrusted to the Franciscans	
Daramombe	Nharira	1939		
St Giles Anglican Church	Nharira, Guvakuva	?	St Giles	
