= Luisa Guidotti Mistrali =

Italian physician

Venerable Luisa Guidotti Mistrali
- Born: 16 May 1932; Parma, Kingdom of Italy
- Died: 6 July 1979 (aged 47); Salisbury, Zimbabwe Rhodesia
- Resting place: Modena Cathedral

Luisa Guidotti Mistrali (16 May 1932 – 6 July 1979) was an Italian laywoman of the Roman Catholic Church who worked in the missions in Rhodesia. She was a member of the Women's Medical Missions Association. Guidotti tended to the ill in several hospitals across Rhodesia and was even noted for taking care of Robert Mugabe's mother on one occasion. Her work saw hospitals expand to treat a greater number of patients and her work was appreciated nationwide which in part led to charges against her being dropped after she was accused of treating a guerrilla which she had in fact done. Her beatification process opened in 1995 in Modena.

== Life ==
Luisa Guidotti Mistrali was born in mid-1932 in Parma as the first of three children to Camillo Guidotti and Anna Mistrali. Her mother was a baroness from Parma and her father's side owned the Fabbrico castle in Reggio Emilia for four centuries.

Her mother died from an incurable disease in 1947 and her father decided to relocate with his children to Modena where her maternal aunt Maria assumed care for the three children. Mistrali's education was spent in Modena and she received a religious formation from Catholic Action whom she grew close to around that time. In 1957 she had her first encounter with the Women's Medical Missions Association and later joined them. Guidotti enrolled in a medicine course and graduated in May 1960 in Parma. Her education then allowed her in 1962 to specialize in Radiology at the Ospedale di Santo Spirito in Sassia in Rome where she graduated from on 12 December 1962. Guidotti fostered a strong devotion to Saint Thomas More and chose him as her spiritual guide.

On 1 August 1966 she received the crucifix of the missionaries from the Archbishop of Modena Giuseppe Amici. Guidotti left for Chirundu on 9 August 1966 after having met with Pope Paul VI not long before that. Guidotti arrived in Rhodesia (now Zimbabwe) on 10 August and began working in a hospital in the north, close to Zambia. Guidotti returned to her homeland in July 1967 and on 12 September at the Benedictine Metten Abbey in Germany became part of the Association in full. In February 1969 she moved to the Regina Coeli Mission Hospital on the Mozambique border, after having been working in a hospital in Salisbury since she first arrived in Africa. In December 1969 she joined the All Souls Mission north-east of the capital of Harare and later in 1975 returned to her homeland for another visit.

On 24 June 1976 a guerilla named Antony Nodo was injured during fierce fighting and came to the hospital in need of urgent medical attention. Guidotti arranged for both a diagnosis and treatment for Nodo but was arrested for this on 28 June after the government alleged that she was aiding and abetting guerilla forces. The Red Cross leapt to her defense requesting her immediate release. Guidotti was acquitted of these charges on 24 August and returned to her hospital to work, acting as if the arrest never occurred. But her offering medical treatment to freedom fighters irritated the Rhodesian forces. She exercised due diligence so as to ensure she was not arrested and removed from her work once again. In 1978 she tended to the severe hypertensive crisis of Robert Mugabe's mother.

== Death ==
During the evening on 6 July 1979 she set off in a black Sedan at 8 pm. A police unit had set up a roadblock on the main road about 100 metres beyond the turn-off to the All Souls Mission. When they observed a vehicle approaching which turned off before the roadblock, it was assumed to be absconding and a number of shots were fired, one of which struck Guidotti, who was rushed to the Mtoko Hospital, but succumbed. An inquest was held and the matter referred to the Attorney-General. There was no evidence that Guidotti was acting illegally other than driving after curfew.

The Archbishop of Harare Patrick Fani Chakaipa celebrated her funeral Mass on 12 July though her remains were later relocated to the Modena Cathedral on 23 October 1988.

In 1983 the All Souls' Mission Hospital became known as the Luisa Guidotti Hospital. Robert Mugabe unveiled a plaque dedicated to her at the hospital and was present with his mother whom Guidotti had treated back in 1978. Mugabe also related in his remarks how he had met with Guidotti once in 1974 and was left impressed with her and her work.

== Beatification process ==
The beatification process opened in Modena after the forum for the diocesan process was transferred in 1995 from Harare to Modena. The official commencement for the cause came under Pope John Paul II on 21 April 1995 after she had been titled as a Servant of God and the Congregation for the Causes of Saints declared the nihil obstat to the cause meaning there were no objections for its initiation. The diocesan process was inaugurated in Modena at the cathedral on 20 October 1996 and concluded there on 23 November 2013. Pope Francis issued a decree on December 17, 2022 that she had lived a life of heroic virtue, conferring on her the title, Venerable. The postulator for this cause is the Dominican Francesco Maria Ricci.
