= John Bradburne =

British Indian Army officer and secular missionary (1921–1979)

Servant of God John Bradburne OFS
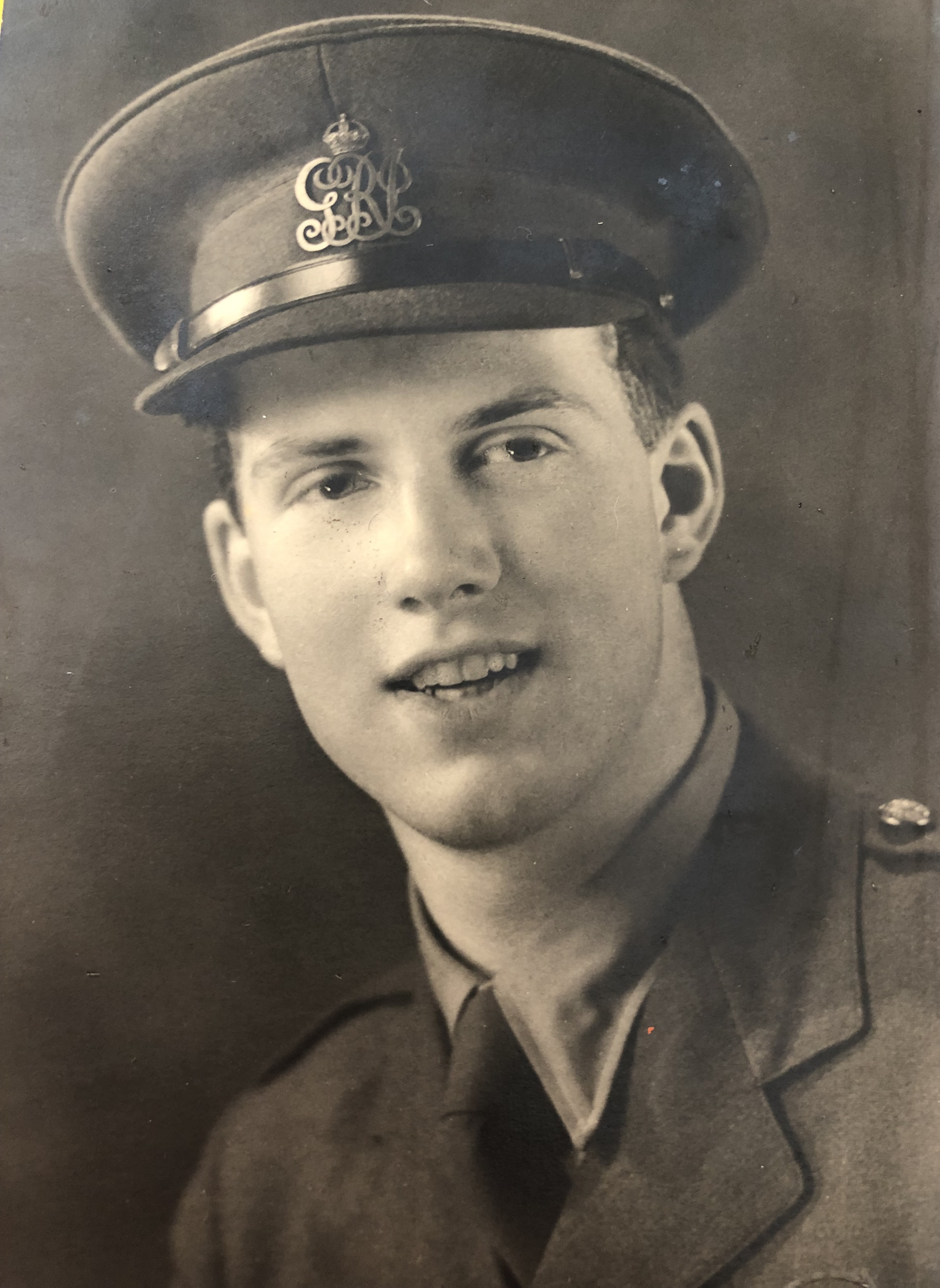
- Bradburne in officer's uniform
- Born: 14 June 1921; Skirwith, Cumberland, England
- Died: 5 September 1979 (aged 58); Salisbury, Zimbabwe Rhodesia

John Randal Bradburne, OFS (14 June 1921 – 5 September 1979) was an English lay member of the Third Order of Saint Francis, a poet, and warden of the Mutemwa leper colony at Mutoko, Rhodesia (now Zimbabwe). Bradburne was killed by nationalist guerrillas and he is a candidate for canonisation. On 15 July 2019, the Holy See gave the nihil obstat for the start of the cause of canonisation by giving Bradburne the title of 'Servant of God'.

== Background ==
John Randal Bradburne was born on 14 June 1921 in Skirwith, Cumberland, England. A son of the marriage of Thomas William Bradburne and Erica May Hill in 1916, he was baptised in the Church of England at Skirwith on 31 July 1921. He had two brothers and two sisters. Their father, an Anglican clergyman, was rector of Skirwith. The Bradburnes were cousins of the playwright Terence Rattigan and were more distantly related to the politician Christopher Soames.

== Education ==
Bradburne was educated at Gresham's, a private school in Norfolk, from 1934 to 1939, after his father had gained a new benefice in Norfolk. His brother Michael was at Gresham's with him, but moved on to Eton. Bradburne was a member of the school's Officers' Training Corps. He was planning to continue his studies at a university, but at the outset of the Second World War he volunteered for the Indian Army, with which his mother's family was connected; she had been born in Lucknow. He was sent for training at an Officer Cadet Training Unit at Bulford Camp.

== War service ==
In December 1940 Bradburne was commissioned in the Indian Army. He was assigned to the 9th Gurkha Rifles of the Indian Army and soon posted with them to British Malaya to face the invasion of the Imperial Japanese Army. After the fall of Singapore in February 1942, Bradburne spent a month in the jungle. With another Gurkha officer, he tried to sail a sampan to Sumatra but they were shipwrecked. A second attempt was successful, and Bradburne was rescued by a Royal Navy destroyer and returned to Dehra Dun in India. He then saw active service with Orde Wingate's Chindits in Burma.

== After the war ==
Bradburne relinquished his commission in March 1946, on account of ill health.

Bradburne had a religious experience in Malaya, and his faith became the dominant impulse in his life. When he returned to England after the war, he stayed with the Benedictines of Buckfast Abbey, where he became a Roman Catholic in 1947. He wanted to be a Benedictine monk but the Order would not accept him because he had not been in the Church for two years. After a while, he felt a strong urge to travel.

For the next sixteen years, Bradburne wandered through England, France, Italy, Greece and the Middle East with only a Gladstone bag. In England, he stayed with the Carthusians for seven months. In Israel, he joined the small Order of Our Lady of Mount Sion, and went as a novice to Leuven (Louvain), Belgium, for a year, where he met Géza Vermes who became a noted scholar. After that, he walked to Rome and lived for a year in the organ loft of the small church in a mountain village, playing the organ. He tried to live as a hermit on Dartmoor, then went to the Benedictine Prinknash Abbey, before joining the choir of Westminster Cathedral as a sacristan. Cardinal Godfrey asked him to be the caretaker of his country house, Hare Street House, in Hertfordshire.

On Good Friday 1956, Bradburne joined the Secular Franciscan Order but remained a layman.

Bradburne's wanderlust was coming to an end in 1962, when he wrote to a Jesuit friend in Rhodesia (now Zimbabwe), Fr John Dove SJ. He asked, "Is there a cave in Africa where I can pray?" The answer was the invitation to come to Rhodesia and be a missionary helper. This is where in 1969, Bradburne found Mutemwa Leprosy Settlement near Mutoko, 143 kilometres (89 miles) northeast of Salisbury (now Harare). It was a cut-off community of leprosy patients abandoned by others. Here Bradburne stayed with these patients until his murder in 1979. He cared for them as their warden but fell out with the Leprosy Association and was expelled from the colony. He stayed in a tin hut, just outside the perimeter fence, for the last six years of his life but continued to minister to the lepers.

After his arrival to Africa, Bradburne told a Franciscan priest that he had three wishes: to help the victims of leprosy, to die a martyr, and to be buried in the Franciscan habit.

== Death ==
By July 1979, the Rhodesian Bush War, then in its 15th and last year, was approaching Mutemwa. His friends urged Bradburne to leave but he insisted that he should stay with the lepers. On 2 September 1979, guerrillas of the Zimbabwe African National Liberation Army abducted him. He was shot and died on 5 September at the age of 58. He was buried in a Franciscan habit, according to his wishes, at the Chishawasha Mission Cemetery, about 18 kilometres (11 miles) northeast of Salisbury (now Harare).

== Legacy ==
Feature articles on Bradburne and Mutemwa appeared in the Sunday Telegraph on 23 April 1989, 28 August 1994 and 14 September 2009. The last two articles were written by the newspaper's editor, Charles Moore, who had visited Mutemwa.

In July 2001, the Franciscan priest Father Paschal Slevin, OFM, presented a petition to Patrick Fani Chakaipa, Archbishop of Harare, for an inquiry into Bradburne's canonisation. Father Slevin commented: "I have no doubt that John died a martyr in his determination to serve his friends, the lepers. If his martyrdom is accepted, his cause for sainthood could go quite quickly".

A service is held in Bradburne's memory at Mutemwa every year, drawing as many as 25,000 people each time. In 2009 a Mass commemorating the 30th anniversary of his death was held at Westminster Cathedral in London. The 40th Anniversary of Bradburne's assassination was marked both at Mutemwa with the pilgrimage and then an exhibition and talks at Westminster Cathedral on 21 September 2019, where his relics were displayed for the first time.

He left behind 6,000 poems. He is in the Guinness World Records for being in terms of lines of poetry alone, the most prolific poet in English. Comprising a total of 169,925 individual lines. Bradburne's output almost doubles that of William Shakespeare. Most of his poems were written after 1968 and cover a wide range of spiritual, natural, elegiac and narrative subject matter. As he wrote his domestic letters largely in verse, new poems from the recipients are still occasionally found.

A campaign to have Bradburne beatified and canonised was started by the late Celia Brigstocke, Bradburne's niece, and continued by Kate Macpherson, his great niece.

On 1 July 2019 the Congregation for the Causes of Saints in Rome issued a formal nihil obstat for the cause of beatification of Bradburne to proceed. The letter was sent to Archbishop Robert Ndlovu, primate of Zimbabwe, who in April 2019 had convened a meeting of Zimbabwean Bishops at which there was unanimous approval to support the cause. A postulator, Enrico Solinas, a lay judge at the Umbrian Interdiocesan Ecclesiastical Court of Perugia, was appointed in 2018 and is taking the cause forward.

On 5 September 2019, the 40th anniversary of Bradburne's death, a special ceremony was held at Mutemwa to officially launch the cause.

== Bibliography ==
- (en) Tom Russell OFM wrote 'John Randall Bradburne 1921-1979 Servant of God' 2020.
- (fr) Didier Rance wrote 'The Vagabond of God' 2017.
- (en) Prof. David Crystal wrote 'A Life Made of Words, poetry and Thought of John Bradburne' 2018.
- (fr) Didier Rance wrote 'John Bradburne Une Vie' 2019
- (en) Renato Tonel wrote 'John Bradburne Mystic, Poet and Martyr 1921-1979' 2018
- (it) Fr Valentine Cascarino 'Thesis on John and Franciscanism' 2019
- (en) Father John Dove, SJ, Strange Vagabond of God: The Story of John Bradburne (Leominster, England: Gracewing, 2001) ISBN 0-85244-383-8 (Published 1985 and 1990, revised 1997, reprinted 2001)
- (en) John Bradburne and Professor David Crystal, editor. Songs of the Vagabond (Leominster, England: Holy Island Press, 1996) ISBN 0-951306-34-0
- (en) Prof. David Crystal and Hilary Crystal, eds., John Bradburne's Mutemwa in Poems and Pictures (Leominister, England: Holy Island Press, 2000) ISBN 0-951306-35-9
- (en) John Bradburne Memorial Society, John Bradburne of Mutemwa, 1921–1979 (Leominster, England: The John Bradburne Memorial Society, ca 1995)
- (fr) Didier Rance, John Bradburne, le vagabond de Dieu [John Bradburne, the Vagabond of God] (Paris: Éditions Salvator, 2012) ISBN 2-706708-82-4
- (en) Joan Carroll Cruz, "John Bradburne / 1921 – 1979 / Vagabond of God / England/Africa", Saintly Men of Modern Times, pp. 163–169 (Huntingdon, Indiana, USA: Our Sunday Visitor, Inc., 2003) ISBN 1-931709-77-7
- (en) Leo Knowles, "Come Sweet Death on Wednesday" : "John Bradburne", Modern Heroes of the Church (Huntingdon, Indiana, USA: Our Sunday Visitor, Inc., 2003), pp. 15–24 ISBN 1-931709-46-7
- (en) Nanette Mary, "The Long Road to Mutemwa" [a poem about the life and adventures of John Bradburne], The Long Road to Mutemwa: And Other Writings (Bloomington, Indiana, USA: AuthorHouse, 2012), pp. xiii–xiv, 1–21. ISBN 978-1-4772-2661-2. The first five pages of the poem are available online at GoogleBooks

== Documentaries ==
- (en) "On Eagles' Wings: The Life and Death of John Bradburne", VHS, running time, producer, place, and date unknown, available from the John Bradburne Memorial Society.
- (en) "Vagabond of God", 59 minutes, format unknown, Norman Servais, Cape Town, South Africa, 1999; released to coincide with the 20th Anniversary of the death of John Bradburne. For more information, go to .
