= Borgel =

1990 children's novel by Daniel Pinkwater

- First edition
- Author: Daniel Pinkwater
- Language: English
- Genre: Science fiction, Young adult novel
- Publisher: Macmillan Publishers
- Publication date: April 1990
- Publication place: United States
- Media type: Print (hardback & paperback)
- Pages: 170 pp (first edition, hardback)
- ISBN: 0-02-774671-2 (first edition, hardback)
- OCLC: 20489636
- LC Class: PZ7.P6335 Bo 1990

Borgel is a children's novel by Daniel Pinkwater published in 1990.

== Plot ==
The story is narrated by the young Melvin Spellbound who joins his eccentric Uncle Borgel and pet dog Fafner on an intergalactic adventure involving time travel and multiple alternate realities.

Travelling along the Interstate Highway connecting the various realities, Borgel is separated from the others by a mischievous teleportation (called a 'bilbok'), and Melvin and Fafner stranded at a roadside root beer stand. Having waited for him, Melvin and Fafner take control of his car, and recover Borgel en route. Thereafter the three rest at a public campsite, where they acquire a new companion in 'Pak Nfbnm*', alias 'Freddie': a self-professed expert on popsicles, in search of an immortal 'Great Popsicle' whose existence maintains the integrity of the Universe. Pursuing that search, they receive directions from a computer made in the image of the Popsicle, to the anthropomorphic gorilla 'Glugo', who conveys them to an island on the River Styx. There, and elsewhere, Freddie is identified as a Grivnizoid, a shape-changing, cephalopod-like predator, desirous of achieving insurmountable power. Can they stop Freddie in time and save the world?

== Controversy ==
An excerpt from Borgel was used as a question in a New York state test for 8th grade students in 2012. The question caused controversy over its nonsensical nature, stumping both students and teachers as to the correct answers. The confusion led to articles in The New York Times, The Wall Street Journal, and other publications. In the original novel, Uncle Borgel tells another absurd fable about an eggplant and a rabbit having a race. The New York state exam changed the characters to a pineapple and a rabbit and then asked students a series of ambiguous multiple-choice questions based on the story.

== Availability ==
This book is out of print in its original form. However it is still in print as a part of 4 Fantastic Novels (ISBN 978-0689834882), a compilation of four popular Daniel Pinkwater books: Borgel; Yobgorgle: Mystery Monster of Lake Ontario; The Worms of Kukumlima; and The Snarkout Boys and the Baconburg Horror. It was reprinted in 1993 in the United Kingdom, under the title The Time Tourists. An audiobook book version was also published by Pinkwater on his website.

== See also ==
- Parallel universe (fiction)
- Science fantasy
- Absurdist fiction
