= Joyce Simango =

Zimbabwean author (born 1948)

- Born: Joyce Hlatywayo; 18 December 1948 (age 77); Chikore Mission, Manicaland Province, Southern Rhodesia
- Occupation: Writer

Joyce Simango (née Hlatywayo) is a Zimbabwean author. She became the first female Shona novelist when she published Zviuya Zviri Mberi, or "Good Things are Ahead", in 1974.

== Life ==
Joyce Simango was born on 18 December 1948 at Chikore Mission, Manicaland Province in what was then Southern Rhodesia. Her father had eight wives, and her mother had been pledged to him at a young age. After their divorce, Simango was placed in the case of one of the other wives, and had an unhappy childhood. She was educated at Samba and the Mvumba Primary Schools in Umtali (now Mutare) and then Fairfield School in Melsetter (now Chimanimani).

Simango married at either 15 or 16 and by the 1970s was living at Honde Mission School, Mutasa District, where her husband was a teacher. With little to do except housework, she became a keen reader. At the time, the Rhodesia Literature Bureau and the Rhodesian Broadcasting Corporation broadcast a radio programme called Mabhuku naVanyori, or "Books and Writers," where authors were able to read from their books and listeners were encouraged to send in manuscripts. With the support of her husband, who helped to handprint the manuscript, Simango submitted the manuscript for Zviuya Zviri Mberi, which she wrote in the Manyika dialect.

== Writing ==
Zviuya Zviri Mberi was published by Longman in association with the Rhodesia Literature Bureau in 1974.

On a very cold winter’s dawn, a Tuesday, Munhamo and her two children, Tambudzai and Chemwandoita, sat shivering in their hut. Munhamo, who was weeping, was wrapped in a shawl which she used as a blanket as well.

— The opening line of Zviuya Zviri Mberi, translated by Chiedza Musengezi

In the book, Munhamo flees with her daughter Tambudzai to save her from an arranged marriage. Tambudzai, raised as a Christian, receives an education, becomes a nurse, and marries a professional Christian man.

The story revolves around Munhamo and Tambudzai's struggle against the custom of pledging daughters for marriage. Munhamo escapes with her children to protect them from the custom. They face hardships, but eventually find refuge with Munhamo's uncle. Tambudzai completes her education, trains as a nurse, and falls in love with Davy Masango.

Despite challenges, Tambudzai fulfils her dreams and builds a beautiful home. Davy goes abroad for further studies, intending to return and marry her. However, when he fails to return on time, Tambudzai feels heartbroken. Eventually, Davy comes back, they marry, and together with their child, they live happily abroad.

Reviews of Zviuya Zviri Mberi, with its portrayal of patriarchal social relations and grounding in the Christian faith, draw comparisons with Bernard Chidzero's 1957 novel Nzvengamutsvairo and Tsitsi Dangarembga's 1998 novel Nervous Conditions.

Elsewhere, George Kahari concludes that the novel falls short of Simango's contemporaries, such as Patrick Chakaipa, Paul Chidyausiku, Thompson Tsodzo or Charles Mungoshi.

== Sources ==
- Kahari, George (1986). Aspects of the Shona novel. Gweru: Mambo Press. ISBN 9780869223789.
- Musengezi, Chiedza (2003). "Joyce Simango, Women are wealth". In Daymond, Margaret J (ed.). Women writing Africa: the southern region. New York: Feminist Press at the City University of New York. pp. 339–342. ISBN 9781558614079.
- Veit-Wild, Flora (1992). Teachers, preachers, non-believers: a social history of Zimbabwean literature. London: Hans Zell. ISBN 9781873836156.
