= Nyazura =

Growth point in Manicaland, Zimbabwe

Coordinates: 18°43′S 32°10′E

Nyazura (formerly Inyazura) (the locals call it Nyazure) is the second largest urban settlement in Makoni District in Manicaland Province, Zimbabwe. It is located 72 km north-west of Mutare on the main road and railway linking Harare and Mutare. The settlement is named after the Nyazure River which is a tributary of the Save River. The local economy involves the extraction of phosphate from Dorowa (to the south-west) which is then exported by train. The town is located 191 km from Harare along the Harare Mutare Highway. It is 20 kilometres from Rusape and 70 km from Mutare.

== History ==
Inyazura was in the time of steam trains a 'booking-off' depot. Salisbury (now Harare) based traincrews would book off at Inyazura and Inyazura based traincrews would then work the Umtali/Beira trains onwards to Umtali (now Mutare). After the laid down booking off period (usually 12 hours) the rested Salisbury crews would then take the Saisbury bound trains back to their home depot. When diesel traction was introduced on the Salisbury-Umtali section (early 1950s) the booking off system was phased out, Inyazura was closed as a re-crewing depot, and the so-called round trip working was introduced whereby Salisbury train crews met up with the Umtali train crews at a booked change over place (usually Eagles Nest siding) where the crews handed over trains and locomotives to each other and then returned to their own home depots.

In addition to being a booking off station for the railways, Nyazure developed into a service center for the commercial farming enterprises that were developed around it in the 1950s. The old "Farmers Co-op" store (referred to as "Big Store") was constructed in this period and continued to serve as the farmers' supply center well into the 1980s. Over the same period, Nyazure became the administrative center for Tsungwesi Rural Council which served the then Commercial farming sector.

A Central Business District (CBD) has also been designated between the old settlement and the main Harare-Mutare road. A number of private entrepreneurs have already started developing various business outlets in the area. The settlement also serves a much larger farming population following the land redistribution programme which has seen all the commercial farming properties around it sub-dived to accommodate previously landless locals.

Since the 2012 national census which put the population of Nyazura at 2110 the town population has risen to an estimate of 8,000 to 10,000 people.

In 2023, there was a land dispute involving territorial boundaries between two of the local chiefs, Chief Makoni and Chief Chiduku and their respective populations.

== Economy ==
Nyazura has a hotel and a post office. It also has two service stations and a shopping mall. The two service stations are Energy Park and TotalEnergies. The shopping mall comprise a supermarket, a surgery, a pharmacy and many small shops including the country's largest mobile network Econet. To augment the surgery is a council run clinic situated in the High density residential area. Nyazura has a fast food outlet, the Valley Inn. Next to valley Inn which is also close to the Mutare Harare highway is a first class lodge and conference centre, the Majestic Valley Lodge. Besides the shopping mall Nyazura town has over 40 small shops and five hardware outlets. It is also home to farm and City Centre, for agricultural and construction materials, and a supermarket. Nyazura town has a Telone phone and internet service centre. There is a full Police Station.

Nyazura has become the stopover for heavy load trucks coming to Mutare from South Africa and Botswana. Given the load limitation of the Birchnough bridge heavy tonnage by road to Mutare from South Africa, Botswana, Masvingo and Bulawayo has to come through Nyazura.

== Education ==
Nyazura has two boarding secondary schools with A level classes. These are the Zimbabwe Foundation for Education with Production (ZIMFEP) run Mavhudzi High school and the Seventh Day Adventist run Nyazura Mission High School. There are also two boarding primary schools. These are the St Jude's Primary School located in the heart of the town and Nyazura Mission Primary school. In addition Nyazura town has one day secondary school and one day Anglican Church primary school, both named St Stephen's, one of which is funded by a funeral and insurance company.
