= Diocese of Harare =

Diocese of Harare may refer to:

- Roman Catholic Archdiocese of Harare
- Anglican Diocese of Harare
