= Slaves of Spiegel =

1982 epistolary novel by Daniel Pinkwater

- First edition
- Author: Daniel Pinkwater
- Language: English
- Series: Magic Moscow
- Genre: Science fiction novel
- Publisher: Four Winds Press
- Publication date: 1982
- Publication place: United States
- Media type: Print (hardback & paperback)
- Pages: 88 pp
- ISBN: 0-590-07753-8
- Preceded by: Attila the Pun

Slaves of Spiegel is a 1982 epistolary novel by Daniel Pinkwater.

== Plot summary ==
At the beginning of the story, a community of obese space pirates inhabit the planet Spiegel, but periodically raid other planets for fattening food. At a feast celebrating their raids, the pirates' supreme commander 'Sargon the Great' initiates a new expedition for the three greatest cooks in the galaxy; at the conclusion whereof, the three finalists and their assistants are brought to a grand festival on Spiegel, and ordered to satisfy all the pirates in a contest of their skills, of which the winner's prize is the lifelong position of chief cook to the pirates themselves. Among the finalists are Steve Nickleson (the protagonist of an earlier book) and his assistant Norman Bleistift, whereof Norman serves as first-person narrator of nearly one-half of the text. Ultimately, Steve and Norman win the second prize of 600 pounds of Spiegelian blue garlic and transport home, which Steve later uses to create a "bright blue" pizza. The first place winner is forced to cook for the pirates forever.

=== Narration ===
The story is told partly in Pinkwater's own narration, and partly by his characters: chiefly Norman Bleistift and Sargon the Great, but secondarily various others including civic officials, flying saucer enthusiasts, and radio-commentators on Earth, and a subordinate of Sargon's on Spiegel.

== Continuity ==
The character of Rolzup, the Martian High Commissioner of Alan Mendelsohn, the Boy from Mars is mentioned; and the protagonists Steve Nickleson and Norman Bleistift appear in The Magic Moscow.

== Availability ==
While this book is no longer in print, it can be found in Pinkwater's 1997 compilation 5 Novels.
