= Ghost Story (TV series) =

Television series

- DVD cover
- Also known as: Circle of Fear
- Genre: Anthology
- Presented by: Sebastian Cabot (1972)
- Theme music composer: Billy Goldenberg
- Composers: Billy Goldenberg; Robert Prince
- Country of origin: United States
- Original language: English
- No. of seasons: 1
- No. of episodes: 22 (and 1 pilot)

Production
- Executive producer: William Castle
- Producer: Joel Rogosin
- Running time: 51 minutes
- Production companies: William Castle Productions; Screen Gems

Original release
- Network: NBC
- Release: September 15, 1972 – March 30, 1973

Ghost Story is an American television horror anthology series that aired for one season on NBC from 1972 to 1973. Executive-produced by William Castle, Ghost Story featured supernatural entities such as ghosts, vampires, and witches. The show's format and tone drew comparisons to NBC's Night Gallery and ABC's The Sixth Sense. By mid-season, low ratings led to a title change to Circle of Fear and a change to the format.

== Premise ==
The series was hosted by Sebastian Cabot as Winston Essex, the owner of a mysterious hotel called Mansfield House. Cabot's introductions were filmed in the Hotel del Coronado near San Diego, California. Ghost Story dealt exclusively with ghosts, vampires, witches, and other supernatural elements. Starting with the 14th episode when the show was retitled Circle of Fear, Cabot's introduction and ending monologues are no longer featured.

== Cast ==
=== Main ===
- Sebastian Cabot as Winston Essex (episodes 1-13)

== Production ==
=== Casting ===
Guest stars included Tab Hunter, Helen Hayes, Jason Robards, Patricia Neal, William Windom, Gena Rowlands, Carolyn Jones, Melvyn Douglas, Stella Stevens, Tyne Daly, David Soul, Karen Black and Jodie Foster.

=== Writing ===
Several episodes were written by Jimmy Sangster, a British screenwriter, producer and director of Hammer Films.

The episode "House of Evil" was an original teleplay by Robert Bloch (written as "The Doll's House").

D.C. Fontana scripted the episode "Earth, Air, Fire and Water", based on a story by herself and Harlan Ellison. Both writers had worked on Star Trek, the former extensively.

=== Renaming ===
Beginning with "Death's Head", the series' fourteenth episode, which aired on January 5, 1973, the series was renamed Circle of Fear. The change was necessary, according to executive producer William Castle, because of low ratings. He attributed the title change to the head of the production company, Screen Gems. Additionally, Cabot was dropped as the presenter. The opening title graphics and theme music were also changed. This reworked version lasted nine further episodes.

== Episodes ==
=== Pilot (1972) ===
Title	Directed by	Written by	Original release date
"The New House"	John Llewellyn Moxey	Richard Matheson	March 17, 1972
A young couple (David Birney and Barbara Parkins) purchase a house that is standing on a site where an innocent woman (Caitlin Wyles) was unjustly hanged. The woman's spirit eventually takes over the family's newborn daughter.

=== Season 1 (1972–73) ===
No.	Title	Directed by	Written by	Original release date
Ghost Story
1	"The Dead We Leave Behind"	Paul Stanley	Robert Specht	September 15, 1972
A forest ranger (Jason Robards) and his wife (Stella Stevens) have a television that can predict the future, including the wife's accidental death.
2	"The Concrete Captain"	Richard Donner	Story by : Elizabeth Walter; Teleplay by : Jimmy Sangster	September 22, 1972
The spirit of a dead sea captain buried in concrete on the seashore haunts two tourists (Gena Rowlands, Stuart Whitman).
3	"At the Cradle Foot"	Don McDougall	Anthony Lawrence	September 29, 1972
A father (James Franciscus) learns that changing events because he dreams that his daughter is murdered twenty years later makes things even worse.
4	"Bad Connection"	Walter Doniger	Story by : Richard Matheson; Teleplay by : John McGreevey	October 6, 1972
A young widow (Karen Black) receives warnings from her dead husband over the telephone.
5	"The Summer House"	Leo Penn	Seeleg Lester	October 13, 1972
A woman (Carolyn Jones) is trapped in a strange world between reality and nightmare—a vacation home possessed of its own malevolent personality.
6	"Alter-Ego"	David Lowell Rich	Story by : Stanley Ellin; Teleplay by : D.C. Fontana	October 27, 1972
Robert, a bored, ill boy stuck in a wheelchair, creates his own double. Robert soon loses control of the evil doppelgänger, who grows stronger as Robert grows weaker. Helen Hayes guest stars.
7	"Half a Death"	Leslie H. Martinson	Henry Slesar	November 3, 1972
Christina (Pamela Franklin) is a young woman distressed to learn of the death of her twin sister Lisa, whose spirit begins to haunt Christina.
8	"House of Evil"	Daryl Duke	Robert Bloch	November 10, 1972
A deaf-mute girl (Jodie Foster) has telepathic powers along with her evil grandfather (Melvyn Douglas), who uses the child as a pawn in his quest for revenge against his family.
9	"Cry of the Cat"	Arnold Laven	William Bast	November 24, 1972
Rodeo cowboy Dan Hollis (Doug McClure) is delighted about his new marriage to the beautiful Mariah (Lauri Peters). When a cougar brutally attacks a bull that had thrown and trampled Dan in the arena, Dan's stallion, and his former girlfriend, the other cowboys suspect that the legendary cat "Big Red" has returned while Mariah fears that she's possessed.
10	"Elegy for a Vampire"	Don McDougall	Mark Weingart & Elizabeth Walter	December 1, 1972
A college professor (Hal Linden) becomes a vampire and preys on his female students.
11	"Touch of Madness"	Robert Day	Halsted Welles	December 8, 1972
A young woman (Lynn Loring) inherits a house after her mother dies in a mental institution. Her aunt (Geraldine Page) and uncle (Rip Torn) welcome her warmly, but neither they nor the house are what they seem.
12	"Creatures of the Canyon"	Walter Doniger	Del Reisman	December 15, 1972
A woman (Angie Dickinson) is troubled by a dog which turns vicious after its master dies.
13	"Time of Terror"	Robert Day	Jimmy Sangster	December 22, 1972
Ellen (Patricia Neal) wakes up alone in a hotel room with no sign of her husband, Harry. She learns at the front desk that he has checked out without her, and further inquiries lead her to a man (Craig Stevens) who helps her discover what really happened to Harry.
Circle of Fear
14	"Death's Head"	James Neilson	Rick Blum	January 5, 1973
Carol (Janet Leigh), the wife of a lawyer and devout entomologist (Gene Nelson), dislikes insects and has eyes for her husband's partner (Rory Calhoun). She is susceptible when she meets a gypsy with a potion to offer, and after her husband's "heart attack" she figures to take up with the lawyer friend—until the legend of the Death's Head moth begins to come true.
15	"Dark Vengeance"	Herschel Daugherty	Peter L. Dixon	January 12, 1973
A construction worker (Martin Sheen) unearths a curious box, takes it home and opens it. His wife (Kim Darby) begins to be terrorized by the object it contains: a toy wooden horse that grows into something more.
16	"Earth, Air, Fire and Water"	Alexander Singer	Story by : Harlan Ellison & D. C. Fontana; Teleplay by : D. C. Fontana	January 19, 1973
Six young artists (One of them played by Tyne Daly) discover ancient, mysterious bottles in a warehouse which wield an abnormal influence over them.
17	"Doorway to Death"	Daryl Duke	Jimmy Sangster	January 26, 1973
When a family moves into a new apartment in San Francisco, young Robert (Leif Garrett) starts exploring and discovers an empty apartment upstairs. He opens a door that leads to a cabin in the woods, and sees a wood-chopping man who beckons to him. Robert brings his younger sister (Dawn Lyn) to meet the man upstairs, the spirit of an ax murderer who expresses an interest in meeting their older sister, Peggy (Susan Dey).
18	"Legion of Demons"	Paul Stanley	Anthony Lawrence	February 2, 1973
A young secretary (Shirley Knight) from a small town joins her more experienced friend in the city only to be baffled by the office's witch-like happenings.
19	"The Graveyard Shift"	Don McDougall	Mann Rubin	February 16, 1973
The unborn child of a couple (John Astin, Patty Duke) appears to be threatened by ghosts from an old horror picture studio.
20	"Spare Parts"	Charles Dubin	Story by : Paule Mason & Seeleg Lester; Teleplay by : Jimmy Sangster & Seeleg Lester	February 23, 1973
A transplant specialist (Don Knight) dies prematurely but donates his eyes, hands, and voice to three patients, all of whom suddenly take on his characteristics and seek vengeance on his widow (Susan Oliver), who he believes murdered him.
21	"The Ghost of Potter's Field"	Don McDougall	Bill S. Ballinger	March 23, 1973
A magazine journalist (Tab Hunter) is almost destroyed by his doppelgänger until he finds out the true identity of a hit man (Darwin Joston) buried in a potter's field.
22	"The Phantom of Herald Square"	James H. Brown	Story by : Seeleg Lester & Ed De Blasio; Teleplay by : Seeleg Lester & Jimmy Sangster	March 30, 1973
Art student Holly (Sheila Larken) begins dating James (David Soul), but finds herself terrorized by a mysterious old man (Victor Jory).

== Home media ==
Two episodes of the series were included as bonuses in the 2009 DVD box set The William Castle Film Collection. Sony issued the complete series on May 1, 2012.

On July 22, 2020, the complete series was released by Via Vision Entertainment on DVD and Blu-ray in Australia. As a bonus, it included audio tracks from the original 1972 story LP William Castle's Ghost Story — Thrilling, Chilling Sounds of Fright and the Supernatural, originally released by Peter Pan Records.
