= Archbishop of Harare =

The Archbishop of Harare heads the Roman Catholic Metropolitan See for Zimbabwe.

In 2004, the number of Roman Catholics in the archdiocese was estimated as 483,293 (from a total population of 4,866,000), and they were served by 124 priests.

There are three suffragan dioceses, Chinhoyi, Gokwe and Mutare.

The present archbishop is Archbishop Robert Ndlovu.

== History ==
A mission sui iuris of Zambese (in Latin, Zambesia) was erected on 2 July 1879. On 9 March 1915, this was elevated to the Prefecture Apostolic of Zambese, and on 14 July 1927 the name was changed to the Prefecture Apostolic of Salisbury (in Latin, Salisburiensis). On 3 March 1931, this was again elevated to become the Vicariate Apostolic of Salisbury.

On 1 January 1955, the Archdiocese of Salisbury was instituted as the Metropolitan See for Rhodesia.

In 1973, territory was lost when the Prefecture Apostolic of Sinoia was erected.

On 25 June 1982, the name of the Archdiocese was changed from Salisbury to Harare.

== List of Ordinaries ==
- Ricardo Sykes, S.J. (1915 Appointed - 1918 Died)
- Edoardo Parry, S.J. (1918 Appointed - 1922 Died)
- Roberto Brown, S.J. (1922 Appointed - 1929 Died)
- Aston Sebastian Joseph Chichester, S.J. (4 Mar 1931 Appointed - 23 Nov 1956 Retired)
- Francis William Markall, S.J. (23 Nov 1956 Succeeded - 31 May 1976 Resigned)
- Patrick Fani Chakaipa (31 May 1976 Appointed - 8 Apr 2003 Died)
- Robert Christopher Ndlovu (10 Jun 2004 Appointed - present)

== See also ==
- Zimbabwe
- Catholic Church
- Lists of office-holders
