= Sacred Heart Cathedral, Harare =

Cathedral of the Sacred Heart
- Cathedral of the Sacred Heart of Jesus
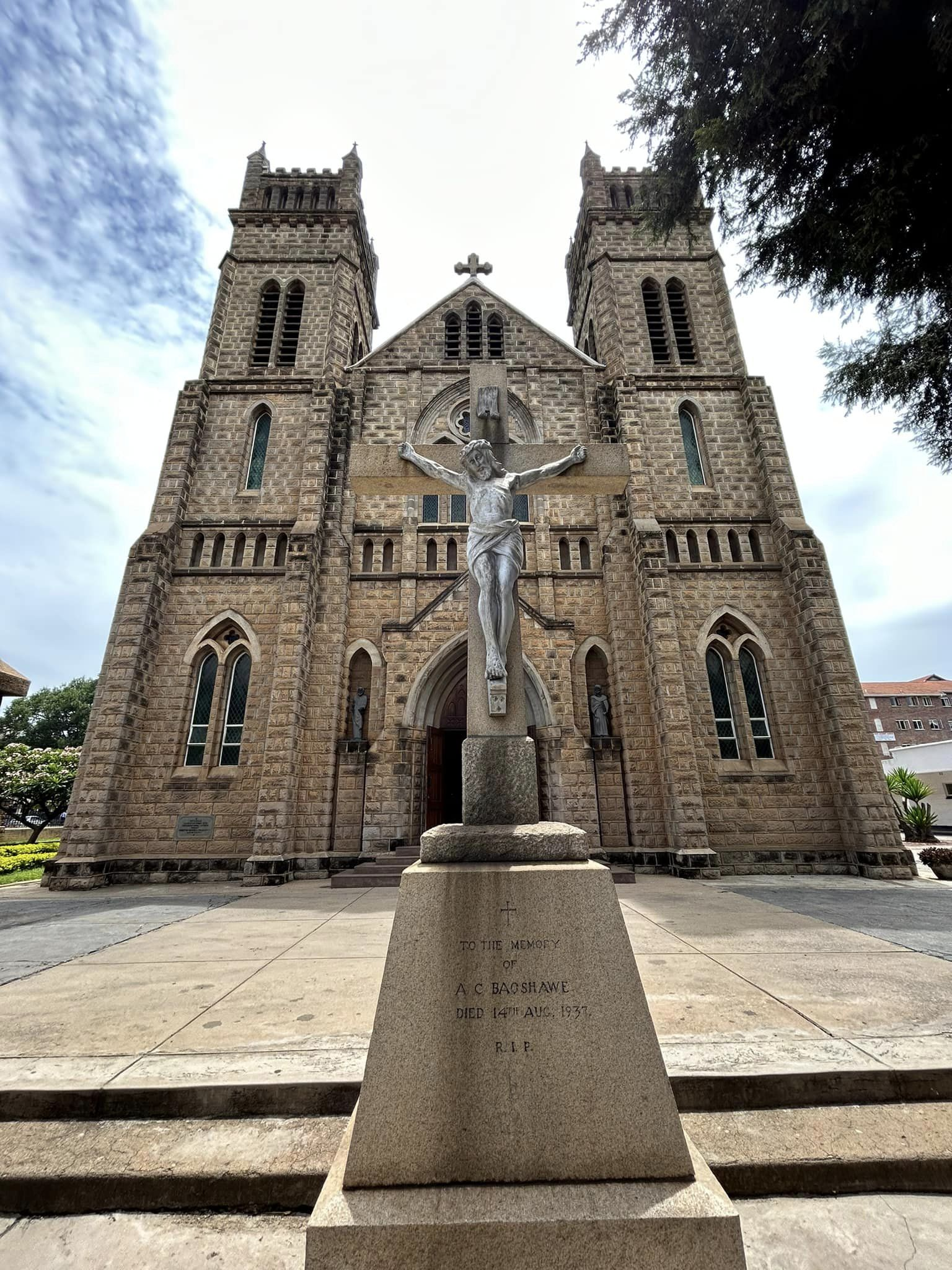
- The main entrance of the Cathedral

- Location within Zimbabwe
- 17.8210°S 31.0532°E
- Location: Harare
- Country: Zimbabwe
- Denomination: Roman Catholic Church
- Website: sacredheartcathedralzw.org

History
- Former name: Church of the Sacred Heart
- Founded: 1893
- Consecrated: 2 August 1924

Architecture
- Architectural type: Cathedral
- Years built: 1924-1925
- Groundbreaking: 28 June 1924

Administration
- Archdiocese: Roman Catholic Archdiocese of Harare
- Deanery: Inner City Deanery of Harare Archdiocese

Clergy
- Archbishop: Robert Ndlovu
- Vicar: Kennedy Muguti

The Cathedral of the Sacred Heart of Jesus is a religious building belonging to the Roman Catholic Church and is located on Fourth Street in central Harare, Zimbabwe.

== History ==
It serves as the headquarters of the Metropolitan Archdiocese of Harare (Archidioecesis Hararensis). It follows the Roman or Latin rite and was dedicated, as its name indicates, to the Sacred Heart of Jesus as a Catholic devotion tradition referred to the heart of Jesus of Nazareth.

It all began when the Jesuits first arrived in what was then Salisbury in Southern Rhodesia (now Harare in Zimbabwe); a chapel for forty people was opened in the grounds of the Dominican Convent in 1893. Fr Aloysius Leboeuf became parish priest, living in a room built onto the side of the chapel, and from here he designed a new and bigger church, the Church of the Sacred Heart, opened on the Feast of the Annunciation in 1900. This in turn eventually proved too small and, on 28 June 1924, Monsignor Brown laid the foundation stone of the present Cathedral of the Sacred Heart. The Cathedral was opened the following year, on Sunday, 2 August 1925. Jesuits continued to serve the Cathedral until 31 December 2008, when it was handed over to the diocesan clergy.

Due to the varied composition of the congregation, most Masses today are held in both English and Shona, a local language, and, to a lesser extent, additionally there are services in French and Portuguese.

== Mass Times ==
Sunday

- 07:00hrs - English Mass in the Cathedral
- 08:00hrs - Shona Mass in the Cathedral
- 08:00hrs - French Mass in the St Thomas Moore Hall
- 08:00hrs - Missionary Childhood/Sunday School Mass in the Jubilee Hall
- 09:30hrs - Youth Mass in the Jubilee Hall
- 10:00hrs - English Mass in the Cathedral
- 11:30hrs - Shona Mass in the Cathedral
- 17:30hrs - English Mass in the Cathedral

Monday to Friday

- 09:00hrs - English Mass
- 13:00hrs - English Mass
- 17:30hrs - Shona Mass

Saturdays and Public Holidays

- 09:00hrs - English Mass

== See also ==
- Roman Catholicism in Zimbabwe
- Sacred Heart Cathedral (disambiguation)
