= Norb =

Norb may refer to: Norb abbreviation of the name Norbert

- Norb (comic), a newspaper comic strip that began in 1989
- Norb, a character in the anime series Eureka Seven
