= Richard Sykes =

Richard Sykes may refer to:

- Sir Richard Sykes (microbiologist) (born 1942), microbiologist, former Rector of Imperial College, London and Chairman of GlaxoSmithKline
- Richard Sykes (prelate) (1854–1920), Roman Catholic prelate, Apostolic Prefect of Zambesi (1915–1919)
- Sir Richard Sykes (diplomat) (1920–1979), British diplomat, assassinated in 1979
- Richard Sykes (rugby union) (1839–1923), rugby player and landowner in North Dakota
