= Rucuma =

- Location within Tunisia
- 37.048181°N 9.521675°E
- Location: Tunisia
- Region: Bizerte Governorate

Titular see of Rucuma Rucuma (adjectival form: Rucumensis)

Location
- Country: Tunisia

Information
- Denomination: Catholic Church
- Sui iuris church: Latin Church
- Established: July 2, 1966

Current leadership
- Pope: Leo XIV
- Titular Bishop: Thomas Maria Renz

Rucuma is a former city and bishopric in Roman North Africa, which remains a Latin Catholic titular see.

== History ==
It was among the cities of sufficient importance in the late Roman province of Africa Proconsularis to become a suffragan bishopric of its capital Carthage's Metropolitan Archbishopric, yet faded so completely, plausibly at the 7th century advent of Islam, that its location, now in northern Tunisia, wasn't identified precisely.

Historically recorded Diocesan bishops were :

- Lucianus, attended the Council of Carthage in 256, called by Saint Cyprian on lapsi ('lapsed' Christians, who accepted forced pagan sacrifices to avoid martyrdom)
- Maximus, who intervened at another Council of Carthage in 646, against the heresy monothelitism.

== Titular see ==
The diocese was nominally restored in 1933 as titular bishopric of Rucuma (Latin = Curiate Italian) / Rucumen(sis) (Latin adjective).

It has had the following incumbents, of the fitting Episcopal (lowest) rank:

- Jean-Joseph-Léonce Villepelet (2 July 1966 – resigned 10 Dec 1970) as emeritate, previously Bishop of Nantes (France) (1936.08.20 – 1966.07.02); died 1982
- Patrick Fani Chakaipa (15 Oct 1972 – 31 May 1976) as Auxiliary Bishop of Archdiocese of Salisbury (Zimbabwe) (1972.10.15 – 1976.05.31), next Metropolitan Archbishop of Salisbury (1976.05.31 – 1982.06.25), President of Zimbabwe Catholic Bishops’ Conference (1977 – 1984), Metropolitan Archbishop of Harare (Zimbabwe) (1982.06.25 – death 2003.04.08), President of Inter-Regional Meeting of Bishops of Southern Africa (1992–1995)
- John Huston Ricard, Josephites (S.S.J.) (25 May 1984 – 20 Jan 1997), next Auxiliary Bishop of Archdiocese of Baltimore (Maryland, US) (1984.05.25 – 1997.01.20), Bishop of Diocese of Pensacola-Tallahassee, (Florida, US) (1997.01.20 [1997.03.13] – retired 2011.03.11)
- Thomas Maria Renz (29 April 1997 – ...) as Auxiliary Bishop of Rottenburg–Stuttgart (Germany) (1997.04.29 – ...).

== See also ==
- List of Catholic dioceses in Tunisia

== Sources and external links ==
- GCatholic - (former &) titular see
- Rucuma in Catholic Hierarchy.

Bibliography

- Pius Bonifacius Gams, Series episcoporum Ecclesiae Catholicae, Leipzig 1931, p. 468
- Stefano Antonio Morcelli, Africa christiana, Volume I, Brescia 1816, p. 263
