= Night of the Werewolf =

1979 book by Franklin W. Dixon

- Author: Franklin W. Dixon
- Language: English
- Series: Hardy Boys
- Genre: Detective, mystery
- Publisher: Wanderer Books, Grosset & Dunlap
- Publication date: 1979
- Publication place: United States
- Media type: Print (paperback)
- Pages: 181 pp (first edition paperback)
- ISBN: 0-448-43696-5 (first edition paperback)
- OCLC: 60346051
- Preceded by: The Sting of the Scorpion
- Followed by: Mystery of the Samurai Sword

Night of the Werewolf is the fifty-ninth volume in the original Hardy Boys series of mystery books for children and teens, published under the pseudonym Franklin W. Dixon. It was published by Wanderer Books in 1979 and by Grosset & Dunlap in 2005.

== Plot summary ==
When a wolf-like creature appears in the small town of Bayport on the night of a full moon, the Hardy boys are engaged to clear the name of a young man who is suspected to have a history of werewolves in his family line. Joe barely escapes death as the young detectives solve this mystery.

== Notes ==
The original 1979 Wanderer text (and the 2005 Grosset & Dunlap printings) have the Native American servant named Pocahontas. For the Minstrel books from 1987–1996 the character's name was changed to Elizabeth.
