= Robert Brown (prelate) =

Father Robert Brown S.J.
- Prefect of Salisbury
- See: Prefecture Apostolic of Salisbury
- Appointed: 1922
- Installed: 1922
- Term ended: 1929
- Predecessor: Edward Parry
- Successor: Aston Chichester

Personal details
- Born: Robert Brown; 1877 United Kingdom
- Died: 1947 (aged 69–70)
- Denomination: Roman Catholic

Father Robert Brown S.J. (1877 – 1947) was the third Prefect of Zambesi, (appointed 1922) and the first Prefect of Salisbury, Southern Rhodesia, after the Prefecture was renamed in 1927. He was appointed as such on 14 July 1927. He resigned in 1929.

Catholic Church titles
Preceded by Edward Parry (Prefect of Zambese)	Prefect of Salisbury, Southern Rhodesia; 1927 - 1929	Succeeded by Aston Chichester; Vicar Apostolic of Salisbury
Preceded by Edward Parry (Prefect of Zambese)	Prefect of Zambese, Southern Rhodesia; 1922 - 1927	Succeeded by Aston Chichester; Vicar Apostolic of Salisbury
