= Catholic University of Zimbabwe =

University in Harare, Zimbabwe

- Motto: Pro Deo et Sapientia (Latin)
- Motto in English: "For God and wisdom"
- Type: Private
- Established: 1999
- Founders: Archbishop of Harare Diocese Robert Christopher Ndlovu, Professor George P. Kahari, Herbert Munangatire
- Parent institution: Zimbabwe Catholic Bishops Conference (ZCBC)
- Religious affiliation: Roman Catholic Church
- Academic affiliations: Zimbabwe Council of Higher Education (ZIMCHE)
- Chancellor: Archbishop of Harare Diocese Robert Ndlovu
- Vice-Chancellor: Professor Ranga Zinyemba
- Rector: Professor Ranga Zinyemba
- Location: Harare, Harare Metropolitan Province, Zimbabwe; 17.868876°S 31.06737°E
- Campus: St. Augustine (Bulawayo), Diocesan Training Centre (Mutare), Hope Tariro School (Chinhoyi)
- Colours: Gold and maroon
- Website: www.cuz.ac.zw

The Catholic University of Zimbabwe (CUZ) is a Catholic Church affiliated university established in 1999 in Harare, Zimbabwe's capital city. It offers six undergraduate degree programs: Bachelor of Business Management & Information Technology (Honors), Bachelor of Business Management (Honors), Bachelor of Accounting (Honors), Bachelor of Social Science in Development Studies (Honors), Bachelor of Theology and Bachelor of Arts Dual (Honours). It also offers a variety of short courses under the Faculty of Commerce and the Faculty of Humanities.

In 2014, the university extended its reach by opening three satellite campuses in Bulawayo, Chinhoyi and Mutare.

The Catholic University plans to introduce more full-time degree programs and short courses in response to students' needs.

== Values ==
- Ethical behavior
- Collegiality
- Commitment
- Service
- Excellence

== Faculties ==
- Faculty of Commerce
- Faculty of Humanities
- Faculty of Theology
