= In the Mist and Other Uncanny Encounters =

- Dust-jacket illustration by Stephen E. Fabian.
- Author: Elizabeth Walter
- Illustrator: frontispiece by Stephen E. Fabian
- Cover artist: Stephen E. Fabian
- Language: English
- Genre: Fantasy, Horror
- Publisher: Arkham House
- Publication date: 1979
- Publication place: United States
- Media type: Print (hardback)
- Pages: xi, 202
- ISBN: 0-87054-083-1
- OCLC: 4641994
- Dewey Decimal: 823/.9/14
- LC Class: PZ4.W23 In 1979 PR6073.A4285

In the Mist and Other Uncanny Encounters is a collection of stories by British writer Elizabeth Walter. It was released in 1979 and was the author's first book published by Arkham House . It was published in an edition of 4,053 copies. The stories were selected by the author and were those she considered to be her best.

== Contents ==
In the Mist and Other Uncanny Encounters contains the following tales:

1. "Preface"
2. "The Concrete Captain"
3. "The Sin Eater"
4. "In the Mist"
5. "Come and Get Me"
6. "The Island of Regrets"
7. "The Hare"
8. "Davy Jones's Tale"

== Sources ==
- Jaffery, Sheldon (1989). The Arkham House Companion. Mercer Island, WA: Starmont House, Inc. p. 123. ISBN 1-55742-005-X.
- Chalker, Jack L.; Mark Owings (1998). The Science-Fantasy Publishers: A Bibliographic History, 1923-1998. Westminster, MD and Baltimore: Mirage Press, Ltd. p. 53.
- Joshi, S.T. (1999). Sixty Years of Arkham House: A History and Bibliography. Sauk City, WI: Arkham House. p. 146. ISBN 0-87054-176-5.
- Nielsen, Leon (2004). Arkham House Books: A Collector's Guide. Jefferson, NC and London: McFarland & Company, Inc. p. 126. ISBN 0-7864-1785-4.
