= Thomas Maria Renz =

Roman Catholic bishop

Coat of arms of Thomas Maria Renz.

Thomas Maria Renz (born December 9, 1957, in Munich) is a German theologian and, since April 29, 1997, an auxiliary bishop of the Diocese of Rottenburg-Stuttgart and the titular bishop of Rucuma.

Renz was ordained for the Diocese of Rottenburg-Stuttgart in Rome in 1984. Then, he worked as pastor and dean in Bad Saulgau. At 39, he was the youngest participant of the German Bishops Conference. On account of his uncomplicated manner, he is called the "Bishop of Youth."
