= Daniel Pinkwater =

American children's author (born 1941)

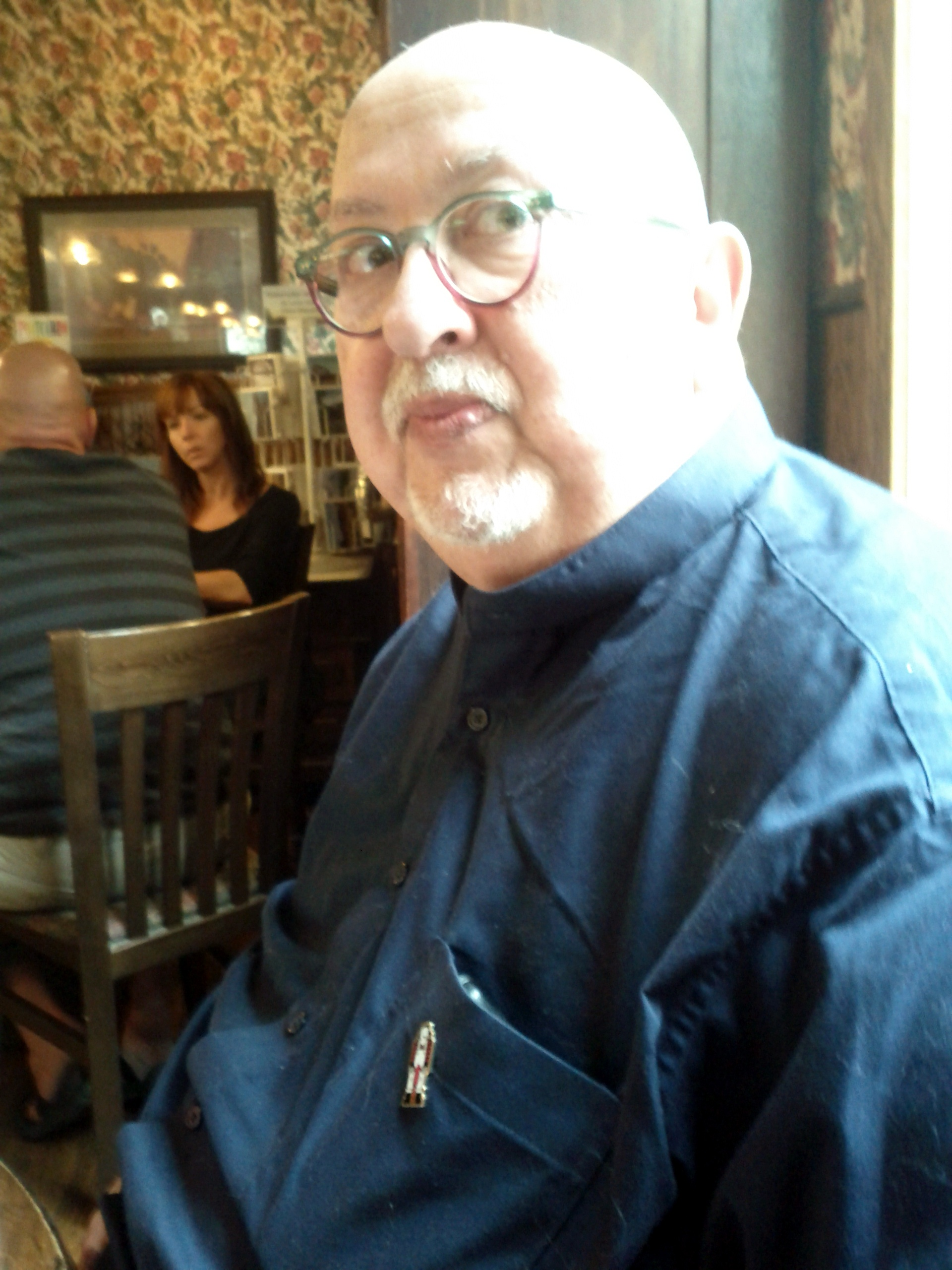
- Pinkwater in 2011
- Born: Manus Pinkwater; November 15, 1941 (age 85); Memphis, Tennessee, U.S.
- Education: Bard College
- Occupations: Author, illustrator
- Spouse: Jill Pinkwater (m. 1969; died 2022)
- Writing career
- Pen name: Daniel Pinkwater, Daniel M. Pinkwater, Daniel Manus Pinkwater, D. Manus Pinkwater
- Genres: Children's literature, young adult fiction
- Notable work: The Hoboken Chicken Emergency; Alan Mendelsohn, the Boy from Mars; The Snarkout Boys and the Avocado of Death; The Big Orange Splot; Borgel
- Website: pinkwater.com

Daniel Manus Pinkwater (born November 15, 1941) is an American author of children's books and young adult fiction. His books include Lizard Music, The Snarkout Boys and the Avocado of Death, Fat Men from Space, Borgel, and the picture book The Big Orange Splot. Pinkwater has also written an adult novel, The Afterlife Diet (1995), and essay collections derived from his talks on National Public Radio.

Many elements of his fiction are based on real events and people that Pinkwater encountered in his youth.

== Early life, family and education ==
Manus Pinkwater was born on November 15, 1941, in Memphis, Tennessee, to Jewish immigrant parents from Poland. He describes his father, Philip, as a "ham-eating, iconoclastic Jew" and "gangster" who was expelled from Warsaw by the decent Jews. Pinkwater and his family moved to Chicago, where he was raised.

Pinkwater attended the Black-Foxe Military Institute in Hollywood, where he befriended Errol Flynn's son Sean, and wound up in high school back in Chicago. After graduating, Pinkwater attended Bard College, in New York State. An art major, he found the experience of studying art in a college unsatisfactory, and served an apprenticeship with sculptor David Nyvall in Chicago. After three years, Nyvall told Pinkwater that he would never make it as a sculptor, and Nyvall had always thought Pinkwater would be a writer. Pinkwater says that he always regretted the unkind things he said to Nyvall on that occasion.

A moment of fame came when he posed as Inspector Fermez LaBouche for the fumetti strip that ran in the final issues of Help! (September 1965); Pinkwater had been spotted at a party by Terry Gilliam. Pinkwater rode in a Volkswagen convertible to a photo shoot with Gilliam, Robert Crumb, and Help's creator Harvey Kurtzman—none of the men had any interest in the others. He met a children's book editor by chance at a party; Pinkwater invited her to his studio to promote a Tanzanian artist's cooperative, and she suggested that he illustrate a book. Pinkwater received a $1,500 advance for his first book, The Terrible Roar (1970), after replying that he would try to write the book himself.

With his wife, Jill, Pinkwater published a dog training book and ran an obedience school while living in Hoboken, New Jersey. At the time, he was training to become an art therapist, but found that he was unsuited to the work and dropped his studies. However, Pinkwater attended a meeting of an unspecified cult with a therapy client. He and Jill later joined the cult, then eventually left it.

Pinkwater is a trained artist and has illustrated many of his books, but for more recent works, that task has passed to his wife, Jill. Pinkwater's artistic technique varies from work to work, with some books illustrated in computer drawings, others in woodcuts and others in Magic Marker.

Pinkwater varies his name slightly between books (for instance, "Daniel Pinkwater", "Daniel M. Pinkwater", "Daniel Manus Pinkwater", "D. Manus Pinkwater"). He adopted the name Daniel in the 1970s after consulting his cult's guru, who said his true name should begin with a "D".

=== Themes ===
Pinkwater tends to write about social misfits who find themselves in bizarre situations, such as searching for a floating island populated by human-sized intelligent lizards (Lizard Music), exploring other universes with an obscure relative (Borgel), or discovering that their teeth can function as interstellar radio antennae (Fat Men from Space). They are often, though not always, set in thinly—or not at all—disguised versions of Chicago and Hoboken, New Jersey.

He often includes Chicago landmarks and folkloric figures from his childhood in 1950s Chicago, regardless of when the book is set. An example of this is the recurring character the Chicken Man, a mysterious but dignified black man who carries a performing chicken on his head. This character is based on a shadowy figure from 1950s Chicago; after Pinkwater made him a lead character in Lizard Music, he received letters from Chicago residents who remembered the Chicken Man. Pinkwater also pays tribute to the Clark Theater (a repertory movie theatre on Clark Street in the Chicago Loop that changed features daily and stayed open all night), Bughouse Square, and Ed & Fred's Red Hots.

Another common theme is Jewish culture, with character names referencing Yiddish phrases (for example, Shane Ferguson from Lizard Music is named after the phrase shoyn fergessen) or the characters themselves incongruously speaking in Yiddish-influenced dialogue or participating in Borscht Belt culture. Characters sometimes have surnames that append the "-stein" element familiar in some Jewish names to names suggesting other ethnicities (e.g., "Wentworthstein").

In 1995, Pinkwater published his first adult novel, The Afterlife Diet, in which a mediocre editor, upon dying, finds himself in a tacky Catskills resort populated by "circumferentially challenged" deceased.

=== Comics and radio ===
Pinkwater authored the newspaper comic strip Norb, which was illustrated by Tony Auth. The strip, syndicated by King Features, launched in 70 papers, but received nothing but hate-mail from the readers. Auth and Pinkwater agreed to end the project after 52 weeks. The daily strips were released in a 78-page collection by MU Press in 1992.

Pinkwater was a longtime commentator on All Things Considered on National Public Radio. He regularly reviewed children's books on NPR's Weekend Edition Saturday. For several years, Pinkwater had his own NPR show: Chinwag Theater. Pinkwater was also known to avid fans of the NPR radio show Car Talk, where he has appeared as a (seemingly) random caller, commenting, for example, on the physics of the buttocks (giving rise to the proposed unit of measure of seat size: the Pinkwater), and giving practical advice as to the choice of automobiles. In the early 1990s, Pinkwater voiced a series of humorous radio advertisements for the Ford Motor Company.

=== Challenged book ===
Following an appearance by Pinkwater on the Public Radio International program This American Life, his book Devil in the Drain ended up on challenged book lists at numerous children's libraries.

=== The Hare and the Pineapple used on exams ===
In April 2012, a story attributed to Daniel Pinkwater, "The Hare and the Pineapple", was used on a standardized exam for 8th grade students in New York. The story was based on Pinkwater's short story, "The Story of the Rabbit and the Eggplant", which he had sold to the testing company. The published version changed the racer from an eggplant to a pineapple, and changed the moral of the story. Of the six questions asked of the students, two stood out as the most perplexing: "The animals ate the pineapple most likely because they were ___?" and "Which animal spoke the wisest words?" These questions baffled students. City Schools Chancellor Dennis Walcott issued a statement saying improvements on the state exam will be made in the future. The New York Daily News staff sent the question to Jeopardy! champion Ken Jennings, and he was stumped as well.

== Partial bibliography ==
=== Children's books ===
- The Terrible Roar (1970)
- Bear's Picture (1972)
- Wizard Crystal (1973)
- Fat Elliot and the Gorilla (1974)
- Magic Camera (1974)
- Blue Moose (1975)
- Three Big Hogs (1975)
- Around Fred's Bed (1976)
- The Big Orange Splot (1977)
- The Blue Thing (1977)
- Fat Men From Space (1977)
- Pickle Creature (1979)
- Return of the Moose (1979)
- The Magic Moscow (1980)
- The Wuggie Norple Story (1980)
- The Worms of Kukumlima (1981)
- Attila the Pun: A Magic Moscow Story (1981)
- Roger's Umbrella (1981)
- Tooth-Gnasher Superflash (1981)
- Slaves of Spiegel: A Magic Moscow Story (1982)
- I Was a Second Grade Werewolf (1983)
- Three Big Hogs (1984)
- Devil in the Drain (1984)
- Ducks! (1984)
- Jolly Roger: A Dog of Hoboken (1985)
- The Frankenbagel Monster (1986)
- The Moosepire (1986)
- The Muffin Fiend (1986)
- Aunt Lulu (1988)
- Guys from Space (1989)
- Uncle Melvin (1989)
- Doodle Flute (1991)
- Wempires (1991)
- The Phantom of the Lunch Wagon (1992)
- Author's Day (1993)
- Spaceburger: A Keven Spoon and Mason Mintz Story (1993)
- Ned Feldman, Space Pirate (1994)
- Mush, A Dog from Space (1995)
- Goose Night (1996), later reprinted as The Magic Goose (1997)
- Wallpaper from Space (1997)
- Young Larry (1997)
- At the Hotel Larry (1997)
- Bongo Larry (1998)
- Second Grade Ape (1998)
- Wolf Christmas (1998)
- Big Bob and the Halloween Potatoes (1999)
- Big Bob and the Winter Holiday Potato (1999)
- Big Bob and the Thanksgiving Potatoes (1999)
- Ice Cream Larry (1999)
- Rainy Morning (1999)
- Big Bob and the Magic Valentine's Day Potato (2000)
- The Werewolf Club #1: The Magic Pretzel (2000)
- The Werewolf Club #2: The Lunchroom of Doom (2000)
- Fat Camp Commandos (2001)
- The Werewolf Club #3: The Werewolf Club Meets Dorkula (2001)
- The Werewolf Club #4: The Werewolf Club Meets the Hound of the Basketballs (2001) – with Jill Pinkwater
- Irving and Muktuk: Two Bad Bears (2001)
- Mush's Jazz Adventure (2002)
- Cone Kong: The Scary Ice Cream Giant (2002)
- The Werewolf Club #5: The Werewolf Club Meets Oliver Twit (2002) – with Jill Pinkwater
- Fat Camp Commandos Go West (2003)
- Bad Bears in the Big City: An Irving and Muktuk Story (2004)
- Bad Bears and a Bunny: An Irving and Muktuk Story (2005)
- The Picture of Morty and Ray (2006)
- Once Upon a Blue Moose (2006)
- Dancing Larry (2006)
- Bad Bear Detectives: An Irving and Muktuk Story (2006)
- Bad Bears Go Visiting: An Irving and Muktuk Story (2007)
- Sleepover Larry (2007)
- Yo-Yo Man (2007)
- Beautiful Yetta: The Yiddish Chicken (2010)
- I Am the Dog (2010)
- Bear in Love (2012)
- Mrs. Noodlekugel (2012)
- Mrs. Noodlekugel and Four Blind Mice (2013)
- Beautiful Yetta's Hanukkah Kitten (2014)

=== Young adult/teen novels ===
- Wingman (1975)
- Lizard Music (1976)
- The Hoboken Chicken Emergency (1977)
- The Last Guru (1978)
- Alan Mendelsohn, the Boy from Mars (1979)
- Yobgorgle: Mystery Monster of Lake Ontario (1979)
- The Worms of Kukumlima (1981)
- The Snarkout Boys and the Avocado of Death (1982)
- Young Adult Novel (1982)
- The Snarkout Boys and the Baconburg Horror (1984)
- Borgel (1990) AKA The Time Tourists (1993) [UK]
- The Education of Robert Nifkin (1999)
- Looking for Bobowicz: A Hoboken Chicken Story (2006)
- The Artsy Smartsy Club (2006)
- The Neddiad: How Neddie Took the Train, Went to Hollywood, and Saved Civilization (2006)
- The Yggysey (2008)
- Adventures of a Cat-Whiskered Girl (2010)
- Bushman Lives (October 2012)
- Adventures of a Dwergish Girl (2020)
- Crazy in Poughkeepsie (May 2022)
- Jules, Penny and the Rooster (March 2025)

==== Collections ====
- Young Adults (1991)
  - contains Young Adult Novel, the stories Dead End Dada and The Dada Boys in Collitch (not printed elsewhere), and some Kevin Shapiro stories sent in to the author by fans.
- 5 Novels (1997)
  - collects Alan Mendelsohn, the Boy from Mars; Slaves of Spiegel; The Last Guru; Young Adult Novel; The Snarkout Boys and the Avocado of Death
- 4 Fantastic Novels (2000)
  - collects Borgel, Yobgorgle, The Worms of Kukumlima, The Snarkout Boys & the Baconburg Horror
- Once Upon a Blue Moose (2006)
  - collects Blue Moose, Return of the Moose, and The Moosepire

=== Adult fiction ===
- The Afterlife Diet (1995)

=== Non-fiction ===
- Hoboken Fish and Chicago Whistle (1999): a book of essays, combining essays from two previous books:
  - Chicago Days, Hoboken Nights (1991)
  - Fish Whistle (1989)
- Superpuppy: How to Choose, Raise, and Train the Best Possible Dog for You (1977)
- Uncle Boris in the Yukon and Other Shaggy Dog Stories (2001)
