= The Education of Robert Nifkin =

1998 young adult novel by Daniel Pinkwater

- First edition
- Author: Daniel Pinkwater
- Genre: Young adult fiction
- Publisher: Farrar Straus Giroux
- Publication date: 1998
- Pages: 167 pp.
- ISBN: 9780374319694

The Education of Robert Nifkin is a 1998 novel written for young adults by United States author Daniel Pinkwater. It is set during the 1950s in Chicago and is written in the format of a college application essay. It follows the unusual high school experience of the narrator, Robert Nifkin.

== Plot ==
Robert attended Riverview High School, which was only notable for its anti-semitic attitudes, homophobia, boredom, and anti-communist paranoia. Robert has no interest in any of his classes except for ROTC, a class he is taking instead of PE. His boredom and hatred for school grows and he eventually stops attending for large periods of time, preferring to hang out with Kenny Papescu and his girlfriend Linda in a very beatnik part of town. On a day that he actually attends, he found out that his ROTC sergeant had been fired, on the grounds of being a Communist. Robert's truancy increased even more, except on the occasions that he sought shelter in Riverview from the Chicago winter.

Finally, the school ordered him to be transferred to a correctional school but upon the recommendation of Kenny Papescu, Robert convinced his parents to let him attend Wheaton, a private school. At Wheaton, truancy, when it is even noticed, goes unpunished. This is how, Robert learns, Kenny Papescu has not been to school in over two years. Robert ends up getting straight A's, some in courses he didn't know he was enrolled in. Robert matures greatly while attending the Wheaton school and learns to appreciate art, chess, and the city's architecture; the freedom that it provides allows him to explore his interests with the guidance of the teachers. Robert concluded his high school reflection with the hope that he be admitted to college.
