= The Big Orange Splot =

Children's picture book by Daniel Pinkwater

- Author: Daniel Manus Pinkwater
- Illustrator: Daniel Manus Pinkwater
- Publisher: Scholastic, Inc.
- Publication date: 1977
- Pages: 32
- ISBN: 0-590-44510-3

The Big Orange Splot is a children's picture book by Daniel Manus Pinkwater. It was published in 1977 by Scholastic Inc., New York. The age range is ages 4–8, and all 32 pages have a full color picture.

== Plot ==
Mr. Plumbean lives on an orderly but mundane street, where all the houses look the same. One night a seagull flies over his house and drops a can of bright orange paint over his house, leaving a stain on his roof. The neighbors all want Mr. Plumbean to repaint his house so it will look like theirs again. Instead he decorates his house with a psychedelic tropical theme. His neighbors are astonished, but he tells them:

"My house is me, and I am it. My house is where I like to be, and it looks like all my dreams."

Mr. Plumbean's neighbors ask the neighbor next door to talk him into restoring his house so they can have a "neat street" again. After spending an evening with Mr. Plumbean, the neighbor also remodels his house to look like a ship. When the frustrated neighbors protest, he replies as Mr. Plumbean did.

Gradually the other neighbors find themselves following suit, each one spending an evening with Mr. Plumbean, and then going on to remodel their own homes to resemble their dreams. Eventually each house looks different and special. Visitors fret that it is not a neat street, but the neighbors respond:

"Our street is us and we are it. Our street is where we like to be, and it looks like all our dreams."

== Use in education ==
The book is being used in elementary school education in the US and Canada.
