= Mubayira =

Coordinates: 18°20′S 30°36′E

Mubayira is a small village in Chegutu District in Zimbabwe.
