= Rugare =

Rugare is an African unisex given name. Notable people with the name include:

- Rugare Gumbo (born 1940), Zimbabwean politician
- Rugare Magarira (born 1997), Zimbabwean cricketer
