= The Worms of Kukumlima =

- First edition
- Author: Daniel Pinkwater
- Language: English
- Genre: Young adult, comedy
- Publisher: E. P. Dutton
- Publication date: April 1981
- Publication place: United States
- Media type: Print (hardback & paperback)
- Pages: 307 pp (first edition, hardback)
- ISBN: 0-525-43380-5 (first edition, hardback)
- OCLC: 6862939
- LC Class: PZ7.P6335 Wo 1981

The Worms of Kukumlima, written by Daniel Pinkwater, is a humorous book for all ages, first published in 1981.

== Plot summary ==
Ronald Donald Almondotter, the protagonist and narrator, accepts an internship under his maternal grandfather, Seumas Finneganstein. However, their plans are interrupted by Sir Charles Pelicanstein, his grandfather's friend. He accompanies both men from America to Tanzania, in search of an intelligent earthworm documented by gemstone-collector Gordon Whillikers. In Tanzania, they are joined by tour-guide Hassan Kapoora and cook Ali Tabu. At the advice of general-store owner Baba Pambazuka, they intuitively pursue the intelligent earthworm's habitat in the extinct volcano Kukumlima, without set directions. Finding Kukumlima accidentally, they discover Gordon Whillikers, who is held captive by the now-gigantic earthworms, and required to annually collect the tiny elephant mice used by the worms for unknown purposes. Having explored Kukumlima, and identified the worms' vocalizations (attributed earlier to ordinary earthworms) as means of contact, they escape the volcanic crater during an eruption partly stimulated by themselves, and return to America, where Seumas patents an adhesive sap used in the escape.

== Availability ==
The Worms of Kukumlima is no longer in print in its original form; but is included in Pinkwater's compilation 4 Fantastic Novels.
