= Tony Auth =

American cartoonist (1942–2014)

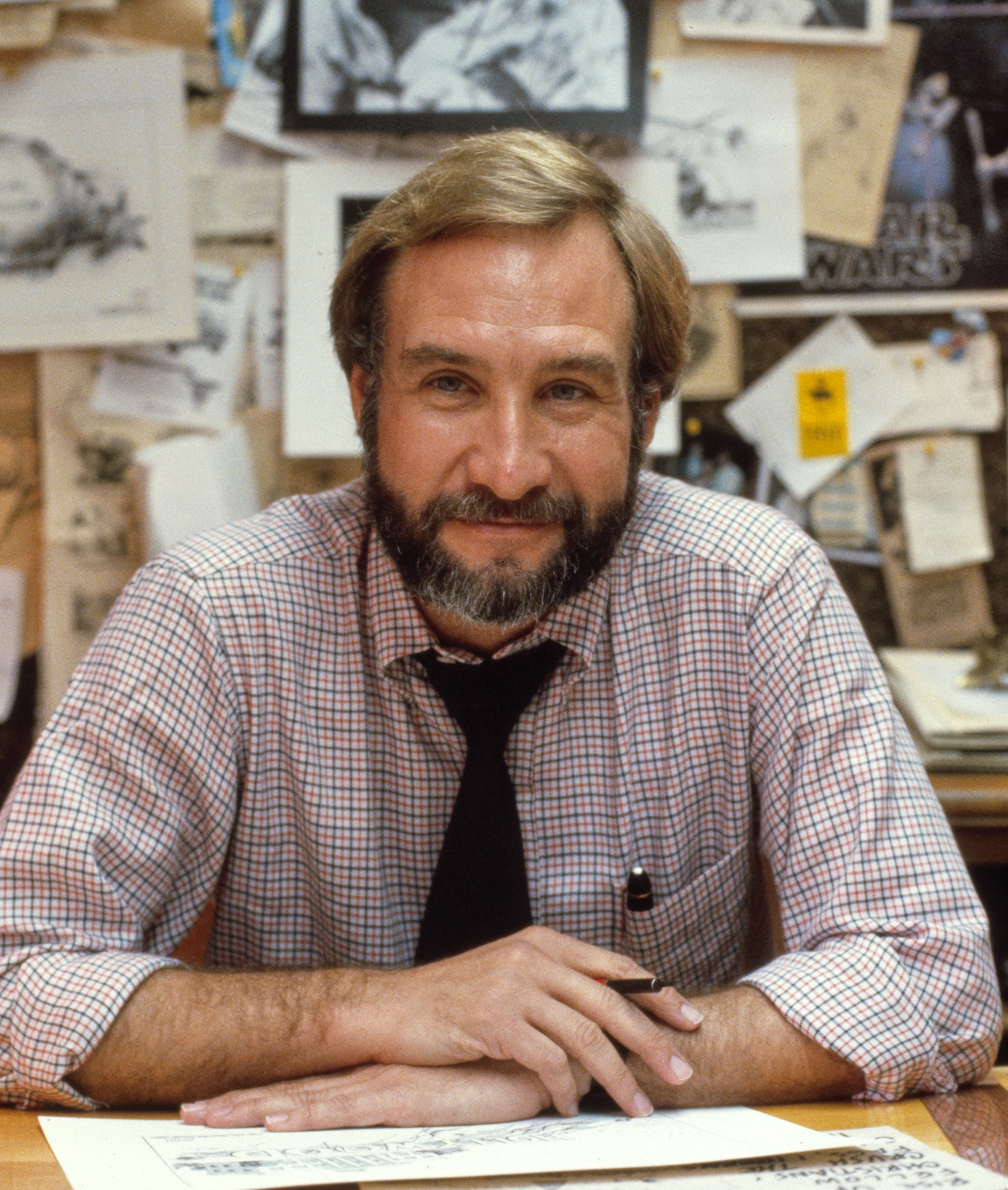
- Auth, working in front of sketches of his cartoons, 1980
- Born: William Anthony Auth Jr. May 7, 1942 Akron, Ohio
- Died: September 14, 2014 (aged 72) Philadelphia, Pennsylvania
- Area: Editorial cartoonist
- Awards: Pulitzer Prize (1976), Herblock Prize (2005)

William Anthony Auth Jr. (May 7, 1942 – September 14, 2014) was an American editorial cartoonist and children's book illustrator. Auth is best known for his syndicated work originally drawn for The Philadelphia Inquirer, for whom he worked from 1971 to 2012. Auth's art won the cartoonist the Pulitzer Prize in 1976 and the Herblock Prize in 2005.

== Biography ==
=== Early years ===
William Anthony "Tony" Auth Jr. was born May 7, 1942, in Akron, Ohio, the son of William Anthony Auth Sr. and Julia Kathleen Donnelly. At age five Auth was bedridden with rheumatic fever for a number of months. During this period of protracted convalescence, Auth was encouraged by his mother to take up drawing as an enjoyable and worthy creative pastime. Inspired by comic book art, Auth began to draw regularly, making use of an ample supply of paper, pencils, and crayons provided by his parents.

At age nine, he and his family moved to Los Angeles, California where Auth continued his education.

Auth attended UCLA where he earned his bachelor's degree in biological illustration in 1965. At UCLA he also worked on the Daily Bruin, the school newspaper, as well as for various alternative newspapers in the Los Angeles area.

Auth was married to Eliza Drake Auth, who is a realist landscape and portrait painter. Together they had two children. The couple resided in Wynnewood, Pennsylvania.

=== Career ===
After Auth graduated he became a medical illustrator at Rancho Los Amigos Hospital, a large teaching hospital associated with the University of Southern California. During his time as a medical illustrator, Auth began drawing political cartoons. Auth started out doing one political cartoon a week for a weekly alternative newspaper. He eventually worked his way up to drawing three political cartoons a week for the UCLA Daily Bruin.

In 1971, Auth was hired on as staff editorial cartoonist by The Philadelphia Inquirer. He would work for this same company for 41 years.

Auth's work was published by the Inquirer five days a week, reaching an additional national audience via syndication. Although his personal politics leaned to the left, Auth used his work as an equal opportunity foil against political incompetence by politicians from both sides of the Congressional aisle. He was an outspoken critic of financial corruption on Wall Street, racial bigotry and intolerance, and gun violence, driving home his points with wit and a minimalistic artistic style.

Auth made use of a light table in composing his finished work, in which he attempted to mimic the rough-hewn simplicity of rapidly drawn preliminary sketches. His content was acerbic and made use of irony in hammering home his political points.

In 1976 Auth's work was rewarded with a Pulitzer Prize. He would be a finalist for the Pulitzer two more times during his four-decade career, finishing on that shortlist in 1983 and 2010. Auth also won the prestigious Herblock Prize in 2005, an award given by a foundation established by the late political cartoonist Herb Block.

Auth retired from his position at The Philadelphia Inquirer in 2012, taking a buyout from the paper. Following his departure from the paper, Auth went to work for the online news producer NewsWorks.org, owned by Philadelphia news-talk radio station WHYY-FM, where he became the publication's first digital artist-in-residence.

His other work includes the comic strip Full Disclosure, which he drew from 1982 to 1983, and Norb, which he produced in 1989. In addition to his ongoing daily newspaper work, Auth published several collections of his political cartoons and illustrated eleven children's books.

=== Death ===
Tony Auth died of brain cancer on September 14, 2014. He was 72 years old.

== Awards ==
Auth received many awards over his career which included:

- five Overseas Press Club Awards
- Sigma Delta Chi Award for distinguished service in journalism
- Thomas Nast Prize
- Herblock Prize (2005)
- Pulitzer Prize (1976)

Auth was also awarded an honorary doctorate in 2012 by the University of the Arts in Philadelphia.

== Works ==
- Behind the Lines: Cartoons. Boston: Houghton Mifflin, 1977.
- That Game from Outer Space: The First Strange Thing that Happened to Oscar Noodleman. With Stephen Manes. New York: Dutton, 1983. —Juvenile fiction.
- Mean Murgatroyd and the Ten Cats. With Nathan Zimelman. New York: Dutton, 1984. —Juvenile fiction.
- The Gang of Eight. (Contributor.) Boston: Faber and Faber, 1985.
- Lost in Space: The Reagan Years. Kansas City, MO: Andrews and McMeel, 1988.
- Mission impossible?: An Illustrated Guide to Defense Planning in the 1990s: A Report. With Stephen Daggett. Washington, DC: Committee for National Security, 1989.
- Sleeping Babies. Racine, WI: Western Publishing Co., 1989. —Juvenile fiction.
- NORB. With Daniel Manus Pinkwater. Seattle, WA: MU Press, 1991.
- Kids' Talk. With Linda K. Harris. Kansas City, MO: Andrews and McMeel, 1993. —Juvenile fiction.
- The Tree of Here. With Chaim Potok. New York: Alfred A. Knopf/Random House, 1993. —Juvenile fiction.
- The Sky of Now. With Chaim Potok. New York: Alfred A. Knopf/Random House, 1994. —Juvenile fiction.
- A Christmas Quartet: Four Modern Tales of the Holiday. With Chris Satullo. Philadelphia, PA: Philadelphia Inquirer, 2000.
- My Curious Uncle Dudley. With Barry Yourgrau. Cambridge, MA: Candlewick Press, 2004.
- The Hoboken Chicken Emergency. With Daniel Manus Pinkwater. New York: Atheneum Books for Young Readers, 2007. —Juvenile fiction.
- A Promise is a Promise. With Florence Parry Heide. Cambridge, MA: Candlewick Press, 2007. —Juvenile fiction.
- Topsy-Turvy Bedtime. With Joan Goldman Levine. Cambridge, MA: Candlewick Press, 2008. —Juvenile fiction.
- A Bedtime Story. With Joan Levine. London: Walker, 2008. —Juvenile fiction.
- Uncle Pirate. With Douglas Rees. New York: Margaret K. McElderry Books, 2008. —Juvenile fiction.
- The Art of Tony Auth: To Stir, Inform and Inflame. With David Leopold. Philadelphia: Camino Books, 2012.
