= Brian Finney =

British-American scholar

Brian Finney is a British-American scholar of English literature. He has a BA (Hons) in English and Philosophy from the University of Reading and a PhD in English from Birkbeck College. He taught at the University of London until 1987, when he migrated to California. Since then, he has taught at the University of California, Riverside; the University of California, Los Angeles; the University of Southern California; and California State University, Long Beach.

He won the James Tait Black Award for his biography of Christopher Isherwood.

== Bibliography ==
- Since How It Is: A Study of Samuel Beckett's Later Fiction. London: Covent Garden P, 1972. ISBN 978-0-902843-37-0
- Christopher Isherwood: A Critical Biography. London: Faber & Faber; New York: Oxford UP, 1979. ISBN 978-0-19-520134-5
- The Inner I: British Literary Autobiography of the Twentieth Century. London: Faber & Faber; New York: Oxford UP, 1985. ISBN 978-0-19-503738-8
- D. H. Lawrence. Sons and Lovers: A Critical Study. Harmondsworth, Middlesex: Penguin; New York: Viking Penguin, 1990.
- English Fiction Since 1984: Narrating a Nation. London and New York: Palgrave Macmillan, 2006.
- Martin Amis. Routledge Guides to Literature. London and New York: Routledge, 2008.
- Terrorized: How the War on Terror Affected American Culture and Society. Amazon: Kindle, 2011.
- Money Matters. A Novel. Amazon: KDP, 2019.
- Dangerous Conjectures. Amazon: KDP, 2021.
