= Norb (comic strip) =

American comic strip by Tony Auth

- Author: Daniel Pinkwater
- Illustrator: Tony Auth
- Current status/schedule: Concluded
- Launch date: August 7, 1989; 37 years ago
- End date: August 4, 1990; 36 years ago
- Syndicate: King Features Syndicate
- Genre: Surreal humor

Norb is a newspaper comic strip written by Daniel Pinkwater and illustrated by Tony Auth. Syndicated by King Features Syndicate, it ran for 52 weeks beginning on August 7, 1989 and running until August 4, 1990.

== Characters and story ==
The strip followed the adventures of a scientist named Norb, who travelled the world with his assistants, Jacobowitz, Rat and the dwarf woolly mammoth Eugen. The team confronted curious adversaries, including Tibetan monks from a Los Angeles lamasery, mad disk jockeys and talking fish on an underwater floating island.

Science fiction author Vonda N. McIntyre wrote the introduction for the Norb book collection, published by MU Press.
