= Aston Chichester =

The Most Reverend Aston Chichester SJ
- Archbishop of Salisbury
- Archdiocese: Salisbury
- Metropolis: Salisbury
- Appointed: 4 March 1931
- Installed: 4 March 1931
- Term ended: 23 November 1956
- Predecessor: Robert Brown
- Successor: Francis William Markall
- Other posts: Titular Bishop of Ubaza, Titular Archbishop of Velebusdus

Orders
- Ordination: 21 September 1913
- Consecration: 19 July 1931 by Bernard Gijlswijk

Personal details
- Born: Aston Ignatius Sebastian Joseph Chichester; 22 May 1879 Ostend, West Flanders Belgium
- Died: 24 October 1962 (aged 83) Vatican City
- Denomination: Roman Catholic

Styles of Aston Chichester
- Reference style: The Most Reverend
- Spoken style: Your Grace
- Religious style: Archbishop

Aston Ignatius Sebastian Joseph Chichester, SJ (22 May 1879 – 24 October 1962) was the first Roman Catholic Archbishop of Salisbury (now Harare, Zimbabwe).

== Background ==
Born in Ostend, Belgium of recusant English descent, he was educated at Mount St Mary's College, near Sheffield. He entered the Jesuits in 1913. He became a schoolteacher, and taught at the Jesuit schools, Beaumont and Wimbledon Colleges, at both of which he served as rector.

From 1929 on he served in Southern Rhodesia (which would later become the country known as Zimbabwe). Father Chichester was named the first Archbishop of Salisbury in 1955 and was also Titular Bishop of Ubaza. He attended the Second Vatican Council's first session as a Council Father. He died on 24 October 1962, aged 83, while attending the council after collapsing on the steps of St. Peter's Basilica. He had been a priest for almost a half a century and served as bishop for more than three decades.

Shortly after he was pronounced dead, he was buried in the Society of Jesus' vault at the Campo Verano. His body would remain there until 13 March 2009, when his body would be returned to Zimbabwe.

Catholic Church titles
Preceded by Robert Brown	Archbishop of Salisbury, Rhodesia; 1931-1956	Succeeded by Francis William Markall
Preceded by N/A; New post	Titular Bishop of Ubaza; 1931-1955	Succeeded by Patrick Cronin
Preceded by Ferdinand Stanislaus Pawlikowski	Titular Archbishop of Velebusdus; 1956-1962	Succeeded by Antônio de Almeida Lustosa
