= Edward Parry (Roman Catholic priest) =

Father Edward Parry SJ
- Prefect of Zambese
- See: Prefecture Apostolic of Zambese
- Appointed: January 1920
- Installed: January 1920
- Term ended: May 1922
- Predecessor: Richard Sykes
- Successor: Robert Brown

Orders
- Ordination: 1894

Personal details
- Born: Edward Parry; 1862 London, United Kingdom
- Died: May 1922 (aged 59–60) Salisbury, Southern Rhodesia
- Denomination: Roman Catholic

Edward Parry SJ (1862 – May 1922) was the second Prefect of the Prefecture Apostolic of Zambese. He was appointed in January 1920 and served until his death in 1922. (Before it was a Prefecture Apostolic, he was its Superior from 1911 to 1915.)

Catholic Church titles
Preceded by Richard Sykes	Prefect of Zambese, Southern Rhodesia; 1920–1922	Succeeded by Robert Brown
