= George Kahari =

Zimbabwean diplomat, educator, arts administrator, and writer (1930–2021)

George Payne Kahari (20 July 1930 – 23 July 2021) was a Zimbabwean diplomat, educator, arts administrator and writer. He served as an ambassador to Germany, Italy and Czechoslovakia. He has been Visiting Professor of Modern African Literature at a number of American universities. After his stint as a diplomat, Professor Kahari was the first black director at the National Gallery of Zimbabwe. He was one of the founders of the Catholic University of Zimbabwe, which was established in 1999.

== Background ==
Kahari was born at Chiriseri in Bindura. His father was a teacher at the Salvation Army's Howard Institute and later joined the British South Africa Police. He had one brother who died young, and was raised as an only child.

== Publications ==
- 2015. The Odyssey of Shona Narratives: A Collation and Collection of Articles and Conference Papers (1964-2012). Mambo Press, Gweru.
- 2015. A Standard Dictionary of Shona-English Names. College Press, Harare.
- 2009. The Search For Identity And Ufuru: An Introduction To The Black Zimbabwean Fiction in English, 1956 – 1980. Mambo Press, Gweru.
- 1994. The Moral Vision of Patrick Chakaipa: A Study in Didacticism and Literary Eschatology. Mambo Press, Gweru.
- 1994. Romances of Patrick Chakaipa: A Study of Thematic Techniques and Mythology. Mambo Press, Gweru.
- 1994. The Rise of the Shona Novel: A Study in Development, 1890-1984. Mambo Press, Gweru.
- 1990. Plots And Characters in Shona Fiction, 1956-1984: A Handbook. Mambo Press, Gweru.
- 1987. Herbert W. Chitepo’s Epic Poem, Soko Risina Musoro – The Tale without a Head: A Critique. Longman, Zimbabwe.
- 1986. Aspects of the Shona Novel and Other Related Genres. Mambo Press, Gweru.
- 1980. The Search for Zimbabwean Identity: An Introduction to the Black Zimbabwean Novel. Mambo Press, Gweru.
- 1975. The Imaginative Writings of Paul Chidyausiku. Mambo Press, Gwelo, (in Association with the Rhodesia Literature Bureau), 1975.
- 1972. Kuverenga Chishona: An Introductory Shona Reader with Grammatical Sketch/ by Kahari and Hezel Carter, School of Oriental and African Studies, University of London.
- 1972. The Novels of Patrick Chakaipa. Longman Rhodesia, (in Association with the Rhodesia Literature Bureau).
