= Richard Sykes (prelate) =

Monsignor Richard Sykes S.J.
- Prefect of Zambese
- See: Prefecture Apostolic of Zambese
- Appointed: 9 March 1915
- Installed: 1915
- Term ended: December 1919
- Predecessor: None
- Successor: Edward Parry

Orders
- Ordination: 25 September 1887

Personal details
- Born: Richard Sykes; 1854 Hackin Hall, Whalley, Lancashire
- Died: 8 May 1920 (aged 65–66) Salisbury, Southern Rhodesia
- Denomination: Roman Catholic

Monsignor Richard Sykes S.J. (1854 – 8 May 1920) was the first Prefect of the Prefecture Apostolic of Zambese. He was appointed on 9 March 1915 and served until his resignation in December 1919.

Catholic Church titles
| Preceded by N/A; New post | Prefect of Zambese, Southern Rhodesia; 1915 - 1919 | Succeeded by Edward Parry |
