= Elizabeth Walter =

English writer

- Born: 1927; London, England, U.K.
- Died: 8 May 2006 (aged 78–79)
- Occupations: short story writer, translator
- Writing career
- Genres: Horror, Fantasy, Non-fiction

Elizabeth Walter (1927 – 8 May 2006) was an English writer of novels and short stories in the horror and fantasy genres.

She was born in London but grew up in the Welsh Border country (Herefordshire). She lived in London in later life though with periodic returns to the Wye Valley and the Black Mountains. An editor for the British publishing house Collins, she edited their Crime Club titles for more than thirty years, from 1961 until she retired in 1994 and the imprint was brought to a close.

She authored six short story collections and four novels. Three of her stories were filmed for television. Several of her supernatural tales were inspired by travels in other countries, especially Germany. She also edited A Christmas Scrapbook for Collins (1979, ISBN 0 00 216196 6), a selection of Victorian images from the Mansell Collection alongside "quaint and curious items of Christmas lore".

== Bibliography ==
=== Novels ===
- The More Deceived (1960)
- The Nearest and Dearest (1963)
- A Season of Goodwill (1986)
- Homeward Bound (1990)

=== Collections of ghost stories ===
- Snowfall and Other Chilling Events (1965)
- The Sin Eater and Other Scientific Impossibilities (1967)
- Davy Jones' Tale and Other Supernatural Stories (1971)
- Come and Get Me and Other Uncanny Invitations (1973)
- Dead Woman and Other Haunting Experiences (1975)
- In the Mist and Other Uncanny Encounters (1979)

=== Non-fiction ===
- A Christmas Scrapbook (1979)
- Season's Greetings (1980)
- A Wedding Bouquet (1981)
