= Francis William Markall =

The Most Reverend Francis Markall S.J.
- Archbishop of Salisbury
- Archdiocese: Archdiocese of Salisbury, Rhodesia
- Province: Salisbury, Rhodesia
- Appointed: November 23, 1956
- Installed: November 23, 1956
- Term ended: May 31, 1976
- Predecessor: Aston Chichester
- Successor: Patrick Fani Chakaipa
- Other posts: Titular Archbishop of Cotyaeum (1956), Coadjutor Archbishop of Salisbury

Orders
- Ordination: September 9, 1937
- Consecration: September 8, 1956 by Aston Chichester

Personal details
- Born: Francis William Markall; September 24, 1905 Harringay, Great Britain
- Died: August 9, 1992 (aged 86) Harare, Zimbabwe
- Denomination: Roman Catholic

Styles of Francis William Markall
- Reference style: The Most Reverend
- Spoken style: Your Grace
- Religious style: Archbishop
- Posthumous style: N/A

Francis William Markall (24 September 1905 – 9 August 1992) was a Roman Catholic Archbishop.

Born in Harringay, Markall was ordained as a Catholic priest at the age of 32 in 1937 and migrated to what was then known as Rhodesia, where he was appointed Coadjutor Archbishop of Salisbury (now Harare, Zimbabwe) in 1956. He resigned 20 years later on 31 May 1976 as Archbishop of Salisbury.

On 29 April 1956, aged 50, he was appointed Titular Archbishop of Cotyaeum and ordained as such five months later, on 8 September 1956. He died on 9 August 1992, aged 86, as Archbishop Emeritus of Salisbury. He was a Council Father at the Second Vatican Council.

Catholic Church titles
Preceded by Aston Chichester	Archbishop of Salisbury, Rhodesia; 1956 - 1976	Succeeded by Patrick Fani Chakaipa
Preceded by Antonio Wladislao Szlagowski	Titular Bishop of Cotyaeum; 1956	Succeeded by None
