= Yobgorgle: Mystery Monster of Lake Ontario =

1979 book by Daniel Pinkwater

Yobgorgle
- First edition
- Author: Daniel Pinkwater
- Illustrator: Daniel Pinkwater
- Genre: Young adult fiction
- Published: 1979 (Houghton Mifflin/Clarion Books)
- Pages: 156 pp.
- ISBN: 9780395289709

Yobgorgle: Mystery Monster of Lake Ontario is a young adult comedy novel by American author Daniel Pinkwater. It was first published in 1979.

== Plot summary ==
A boy named Eugene is visiting Rochester, New York, with his uncle, a hugely obese vending machine tester, when they are recruited by Professor Ambrose McFwain to join him on an expedition to find a sea monster called the Yobgorgle in Lake Ontario. They find the Yobgorgle and realize it is actually a submarine in the shape of a giant pig.

The ship is almost self-sufficient and the crew consists of only Captain Van Straaten. He invites the search party on board and then locks them in. They learn that Captain Van Straaten has a curse on himself much like the Flying Dutchman. He can only surface in his submarine every seven years and no ship (or life preserver) that has him aboard can float within five miles of shore, and he cannot swim. If the captain gets ashore someone has to offer him a decent corned beef sandwich within 24 hours. They get to shore by hydroplaning (not floating), and then they procure the captain a corned beef sandwich.

== Reception ==
Kirkus Reviews declared it to be "(p)ure fun", with "preposterous craziness" that "bears the stamp of Pinkwater's unstoppable, inspired imagination."
