= Alan Mendelsohn, the Boy from Mars =

Daniel Pinkwater novel from 1979

- First edition
- Author: Daniel Pinkwater
- Language: English
- Genre: Science fiction, Young adult novel
- Published: 1979 (E. P. Dutton)
- Publication place: United States
- Media type: Print (hardback & paperback)
- Pages: 248 pp (first edition, hardback)
- ISBN: 0-525-25360-2 (first edition, hardback)
- OCLC: 4497419
- LC Class: PZ7.P6335 Al 1979

Alan Mendelsohn, the Boy from Mars is a novel by Daniel Pinkwater, published in 1979.

== Plot ==
Protagonist Leonard Neeble attends a new school, Bat Masterson Junior High, where he is bullied by his classmates and neglected by the staff. At length, he is befriended by the title character, Alan Mendelsohn, and is thereafter happier and more capable.

When Alan starts a school-wide quarrel over his claim to Martian ancestry, both are suspended from school for one week; during which, they meet Samuel Klugarsh, the owner of an occult bookstore, who sells them a kit meant to enable telepathy and psychokinesis. Having acquired these abilities, Leonard and Alan become bored with the few uses thereof; whereupon Klugarsh lets Leonard and Alan trade their mind-control kits for a course in "Hyperstellar Archaeology": the study of lost civilizations such as Atlantis and Lemuria, along with a copy of Yojimbo's Japanese-English Dictionary. Alan and Leonard are skeptical of the course's wild claims and predictions until they unexpectedly find an article in the text mentioning them both by name; when they follow its directions for interpreting Yojimbo's Japanese-English Dictionary, they become more capable of mind control experiments.

Later, they and Klugarsh encounter the dictionary's author, Clarence Yojimbo, who explains the real secret purpose of Yojimbo's Japanese-English Dictionary: when decoded by the proper key, it enables travel into parallel realities. According to the book's instructions, they enter the parallel Earth known as 'Waka-Waka', where the locals have established a ritualistic culture based on the drinking of fleegix, a beverage similar to hot chocolate; but have fallen under the control of the extraterrestrials 'Manny, Moe, and Jack', who control the supply of ingredients and whose rule is enforced by the deadly and invisible 'Wozzle'. Upon learning that the Wozzle only attacks in bright daylight or total darkness, Alan deduces that the Wozzle is actually the three criminals themselves, made invisible by their own psychokinesis. On this premise, he exposes them to the locals; whereupon he and Leonard use Klugarsh's telepathic technique to trick the trio into surrender. Here, they are commanded to withdraw from Waka-Waka to their own world of Nafsulia, by Rolzup, the Martian High Commissioner (himself invited by Alan).

Alan and Leonard thereafter return to Earth; and soon afterward, Alan and his family emigrate to Mars. Leonard, after recovering from the shock of losing his best friend, assumes Alan's role of school trickster, studies independently, surprises the teachers during classes, and participates in an 'alternative' gym class based on hatha yoga. At the end of the book, he receives a letter from Alan, inviting him to Mars for a visit.

== Availability ==
Alan Mendelsohn is no longer in print as a separate work, but can be found in Pinkwater's omnibus 5 Novels (1997) and in audiobook format on Pinkwater's website.

== Reviews ==
- Ann Haskell, in The New York Times Book Review - "The writing is adequate, no more, no less. But for imaginative plot and decorative detail, Mr. Pinkwater's scores go off the charts."
- Orson Scott Card, in The Magazine of Fantasy & Science Fiction - Highly recommends Alan Mendelsohn, the Boy from Mars.
