= Dorowa =

Coordinates: 19°04′S 31°45′E

Dorowa is a village in the province of Manicaland, Zimbabwe located 3 km south of the Save River in the Upper Save valley about 90 km west of Mutare. The village grew up around the opencast Dorowa Mine where phosphate was discovered in 1945. The mine produces all of Zimbabwe's phosphate (155,000 tonnes were mined here in 1996) . The village is a rural service centre for the Save communal land.

== Mine ==
The mine itself has recently been hit by hard times with power cuts disrupting production and old machinery becoming obsolete with maintenance costs becoming unsustainable. Dorowa Minerals Limited has managed to distance itself from local and regional politics. The departure of long serving General Manager, Mr Mafukidze in 2012 induced a mixed reaction in the workforce. It has however managed to retain a number of loyal workers who have served the mine for a long time especially Mr C Muushandu ( more than 35 years) Mr Chitata, Mr Guwa, Mr Manzira and Mr Makonye who have all served for more than 20 years. The late Livingstone Mahwite was an employee of note who defied many odds. He had no formal education, started as a ‘garden hand’ for one of the mine managers and rose to become an electrical and telephone technician in the company. The mine has two residential areas which are Save Heights, a leafy low-density suburb located in a mountain about 2 km from the mine and Tongogara Village located a further 2 km from Save Heights. The mine also has a fully functional clinic that is open to all surrounding residents and an ambulance for emergencies.
