= Robert Ndlovu =

Zimbabwean Roman-Catholic priest Archbishop of Harare

The Most Reverend Dr. Robert Ndlovu
- Archbishop of Harare
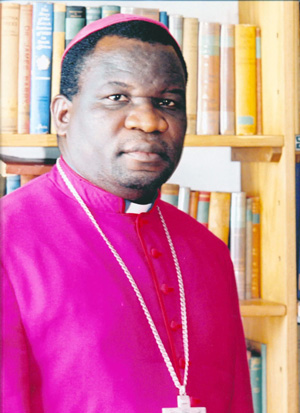
- Ndlovu in 2018
- Archdiocese: Harare
- Province: Harare
- Appointed: 10 June 2004
- Installed: 21 August 2004
- Predecessor: Patrick Fani Chakaipa
- Other post: Bishop of Hwange (1999-2004)

Orders
- Ordination: 28 August 1983
- Consecration: 9 May 1999 by Ignacio Prieto Vega

Personal details
- Born: Robert Christopher Ndlovu; 25 December 1955 (age 70) Southern Rhodesia
- Denomination: Roman Catholic

Styles of Robert Ndlovu
- Reference style: The Most Reverend
- Spoken style: Your Grace
- Religious style: Archbishop

Robert Christopher Ndlovu was installed as the Roman Catholic Archbishop of Harare on 21 August 2004.

== Education and career ==
Ndlovu was born on 25 December 1955 at Tshongokwe, Matabeleland, Rhodesia. He was educated at the Marist Brothers Dete in the Hwange diocese before entering the Major Seminary at Chishawasha. He was ordained a priest on 28 August 1983 at the age of twenty-seven in Hwange, Zimbabwe.

On 9 February 1999, aged forty-three, he was appointed Bishop of Hwange and consecrated three months later.

== Archbishop of Harare ==
On 10 June 2004, aged forty-eight, Ndlovu was appointed Archbishop of Harare and installed on 21 August 2004.

Ndlovu has openly criticised the regime in Zimbabwe for forced evictions and other human rights abuses. He has stated that the "role of a bishop and of the church in general is to stand up for human dignity, and from human dignity flow human rights". This has angered some in the government who respond that the Archbishop is sowing seeds of tribal discord. In August 2020 the Papal Nuncio for Zimbabwe visited the archbishop, and expressed solidarity for his positions on the treatment of Zimbabwean citizens.

=== Service roles ===
Ndlovu serves as Chancellor of the Zimbabwe Catholic University. He also founded the Mother Patrick Primary School at Waterfalls.

As Archbishop of Harare, Ndlovu is President of the Zimbabwe Catholic Bishops' Conference (ZCBC).

In May 2011, Ndlovu consecrated the St Bakhita Catholic centre for the disabled at Makumbi.

Catholic Church titles
Preceded by Patrick Fani Chakaipa	Archbishop of Harare; 2004 -	Succeeded by incumbent
Preceded by Ignacio Prieto Vega	Bishop of Hwange; 1999 - 2004	Succeeded by José Antón
