= Patrick Fani Chakaipa =

Roman Catholic Archbishop of Harare (1932–2003)

The Most Reverend Patrick Chakaipa
- Archbishop of Harare
- Archdiocese: Harare
- Province: Harare
- Appointed: 31 May 1976
- Installed: 31 May 1976
- Term ended: 8 April 2003
- Predecessor: Francis William Markall
- Successor: Robert Ndlovu
- Previous posts: Titular Bishop of Rucuma (1972–1973); Auxiliary Bishop of Salisbury (1972)

Orders
- Ordination: 15 August 1965
- Consecration: 14 January 1973 by Francis William Markall

Personal details
- Born: Patrick Fani Chakaipa; 25 June 1932 Mhondoro, Southern Rhodesia
- Died: 8 April 2003 (aged 70) Harare, Zimbabwe
- Denomination: Roman Catholic

Styles of Patrick Fani Chakaipa
- Reference style: The Most Reverend
- Spoken style: Your Grace
- Religious style: Archbishop

The Most Reverend Patrick Fani Chakaipa (25 June 1932 – 8 April 2003) was the Archbishop of Harare from 1976 until his death in 2003.

== Early life ==
He was born in Chirundazi (Mhondoro) which is some 100 km south of Harare. He was of the Zezuru tribe. His early life must have included the typical life of a Zezuru boy which includes herding cattle goats or sheep as well as working on the fields. He attended secondary school education at St. Michael's Mission Mhondoro, which is a Roman Catholic school. He was well known for his strict discipline during school days and perseverance in difficult situations. He was good at football and was affectionately known by his first name Fani.

== Episcopate ==
He was the first African Roman Catholic bishop in Rhodesia/Zimbabwe. During his seminary years he was a keen writer and completed several books which were written in his Zezuru language. Some of the books included adventure and African culture folklore (Rudo Ibofu, Garandichauya, Karikoga Gumi Remiseve, Pfumo Reropa, Dzasukwa Mwana Asinahembe). He was very instrumental in keeping the Catholic faith among Mondoroans influencing quite a substantial number of young Zezuru Mhondoroans to join the priesthood. He officiated at the swearing-in ceremony of Zimbabwe's first black African leader Robert Gabriel Mugabe. He presided at the president's wedding to his second wife Grace Mugabe.

== Burial ==
He died on 8 April 2003 and was buried at Chishawasha cemetery near Harare.

Catholic Church titles
Preceded by Francis William Markall	Archbishop of Harare; 1976 - 2003	Succeeded by Robert Ndlovu
Preceded by Jean-Joseph-Léonce Villepelet	Titular Bishop of Rucuma; 1972 - 1976	Succeeded by John Huston Ricard
