= Archdiocese of Harare =

Roman Catholic archdiocese in Zimbabwe

Coordinates: 17.8210°S 31.0531°E

Archdiocese of Harare Archidioecesis Hararensis
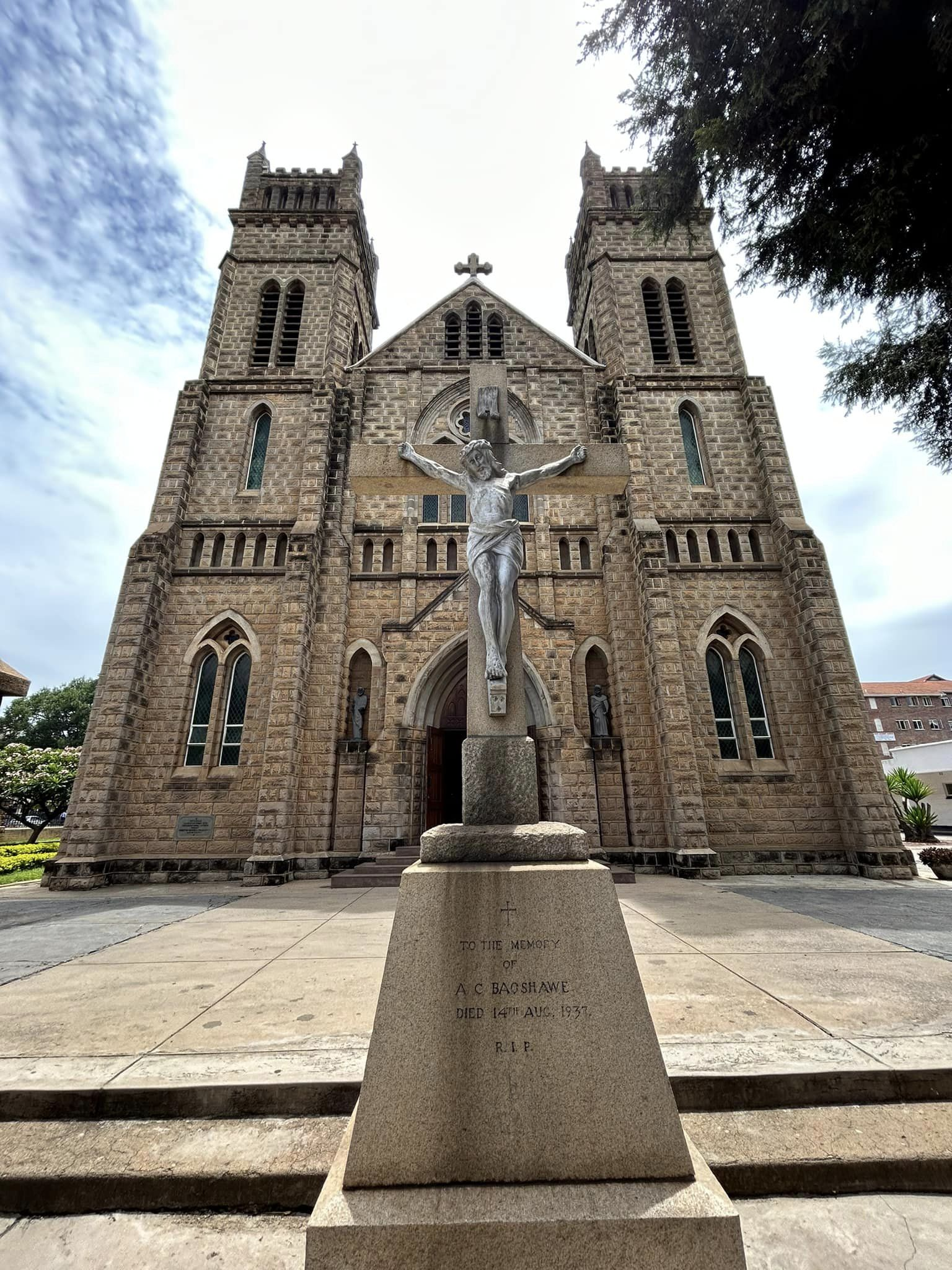

Location
- Country: Zimbabwe
- Territory: Districts of Mazowe, Bindura, Shamva, Murewa, Rushinga (south of the Mazowe river), Mudzi, Mutoko, Kadoma, Chegutu, Harare, Goromonzi, Seke, Marondera, Charter, Wedza, Buhera
- Ecclesiastical province: Harare

Statistics
- Area: 63,555 km^{2} (24,539 sq mi)
- Population: Total; Catholics: (as of 2019); 3,569,900; 640,170 (17.9%)
- Parishes: 57
- Schools: 41

Information
- Denomination: Roman Catholic
- Sui iuris church: Latin Church
- Rite: Roman Rite
- Established: January 1, 1955
- Cathedral: Cathedral of the Sacred Heart
- Patron saint: Peter Claver
- Secular priests: 56 (2019)

Current leadership
- Pope: Leo XIV
- Archbishop: Robert Ndlovu
- Vicar General: Kennedy Muguti

Map
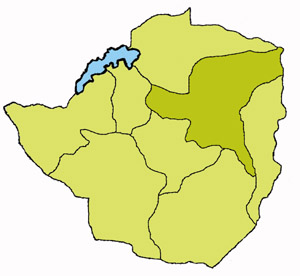
- The archdiocese (dark green) in Zimbabwe

The Archdiocese of Harare (Latin: Archidioecesis Hararensis) is the metropolitan see for the Roman Catholic ecclesiastical province of Harare in Zimbabwe. Its ecclesiastic territory includes the city of Harare, and parts of the provinces of Manicaland, Mashonaland Central, Mashonaland East, and Mashonaland West. The current archbishop is Robert Ndlovu. The mother church of the archdiocese is the Cathedral of the Sacred Heart of Jesus in Harare. The archdiocese has 166 priests, including 56 diocesan priests and 110 religious priests, and 254 religious sisters who are members of various religious institutes as of 2019. These priests, deacons and persons religious serve the archdiocese's Catholic population in of 3,569,900 in 57 parishes and a number of missions.

== History ==
- July 2, 1879: Established as Mission “sui iuris” of Zambese from the Apostolic Vicariate of Natal in South Africa
- March 9, 1915: Promoted as Apostolic Prefecture of Zambese
- July 14, 1927: Renamed as Apostolic Prefecture of Salisbury
- March 3, 1931: Promoted as Apostolic Vicariate of Salisbury
- January 1, 1955: Promoted as Metropolitan Archdiocese of Salisbury
- June 25, 1982: Renamed as Metropolitan Archdiocese of Harare

== Special churches ==
The seat of the archbishop is the Cathedral of the Sacred Heart in Harare.

== Prelates ==
=== Ordinaries ===
==== Superiors of Zambese ====
- Henri Depelchin (2 July 1879 – April 1883)
- Richard Sykes (1896–1904)
- Ignatius Gartlan (1904–1911)
- Edward Parry (1911 – 9 March 1915)

==== Prefects Apostolic of Zambese ====
- Richard Sykes (9 March 1915 – December 1919)
- Edward Parry (January 1920 – May 1922)
- Robert Brown (1922 – 14 July 1927 see below)

==== Prefect Apostolic of Salisbury ====
- Robert Brown (see above 14 July 1927 – 1929)

==== Vicar Apostolic of Salisbury ====
- Aston Chichester (4 March 1931 – 1 January 1955 see below)

==== Archbishops of Salisbury ====
- Aston Chichester (see above 1 January 1955 – 23 November 1956)
- Francis William Markall (23 November 1956 – 31 May 1976)
- Patrick Fani Chakaipa (31 May 1976 – 25 June 1982 see below)

==== Archbishops of Harare ====
- Patrick Fani Chakaipa (see above 25 June 1982 – 8 April 2003)
- Robert Christopher Ndlovu (10 June 2004 – )

=== Coadjutor archbishop ===
- Francis William Markall (1956)

=== Auxiliary bishop ===
- Patrick Fani Chakaipa (1972–1976)

== Suffragan dioceses ==
- Chinhoyi
- Gokwe
- Mutare

== See also ==
- Catholic Church in Zimbabwe
- List of Catholic dioceses in Zimbabwe
- List of parishes in the Archdiocese of Harare

== Sources ==
- catholic-hierarchy
- GCatholic.org
