= List of people from Bulawayo =

The following is a list of notable people who were either born in, lived in, are current residents of, or are otherwise closely associated with or around the city of Bulawayo, Zimbabwe.

- John H Abeles (born 1945), physician, medical investor, philanthropist
- Ignatius Arnoz (1885–1950), Czech prelate of the Roman Catholic Church
- Percelle Ascott (born 1993), actor and writer
- Gift Banda (born 1969), politician
- Lewis Banda (born 1982), sprinter
- Roy Barbour (born 1935), field hockey player
- Leo Baron (1916–1985), lawyer, Royal Air Force officer and contract bridge player
- Marshall P. Baron (1934–1977), painter
- Tinker Beets (born 1941), field hockey player and cricketer
- Berita (born 1991), singer, songwriter and music producer
- Mkhululi Bhebhe (born 1984), contemporary gospel music vocalist
- Erich Bloch (1939–2014), economist and columnist
- Graham Boynton, journalist, consultant, travel writer and editor
- Elias Broomberg (1915–1977), businessman and politician
- Robin Brown (born 1951), cricketer
- Angus Buchan (born 1947), author and evangelist
- NoViolet Bulawayo (born 1981), writer
- Frederick Russell Burnham (1861–1947), scout and world-traveling adventurer
- David Candler (1924–2008), first-class cricketer, mathematician, educator and clergyman
- Warren Carne (born 1975), cyclist
- Jordan Chanetsa (born 1997), activist and artist
- Charlene, Princess of Monaco (born 1978), wife of Albert II, Prince of Monaco
- Brian Chikwava (born 1971), writer and musician
- Charles Coghlan (1863–1927), lawyer, first Premier of Southern Rhodesia; honoured by burial near Cecil Rhodes's grave, at "World's View" in the Matopo Hills near Bulawayo
- David Coltart (born 1957), former Minister of Education, Sports, Arts and Culture (2008–2013)
- Charles Coventry (born 1983), cricketer
- Kirsty Coventry (born 1983), world-record swimmer
- James Cowden (born 1869), politician
- Eddie Cross (born 1940), economist and founder member of the mainstream Movement for Democratic Change party led by Nelson Chamisa; currently the Policy Coordinator General
- Harry Davies (1878–1957), politician
- Harry Elinder Davies (1915–2005)
- Chelsy Davy (born 1985), businesswoman, former girlfriend of Prince Harry
- Brendon Dawson (born 1967), rugby union footballer
- Diana Dean (born 1942), Canadian artist
- Luthuli Dlamini (born 1966), film and television actor
- Mildred Reason Dube (died 2022), politician
- John Eaton (1902–1981), Royal Navy officer
- John Edmond (born 1936), folk singer and retired soldier
- Graham Edwards (born 1970), cricketer
- Chris Ellison (born 1954), lawyer and former politician
- Lucia Evans (born 1982), winner of the 2006 Irish TV talent show You're A Star, born in Bulawayo
- Stanley Fischer (born 1943), governor of the Bank of Israel
- Duncan Fletcher (born 1948), cricketer, former coach of England national cricket team and Indian national cricket team
- Roy Garden (born 1961), lawn and indoor bowler
- Adrian Garvey (born 1968), rugby union player
- Maureen George (born 1955), field hockey player
- Norman Geras (1943–2013), professor of political philosophy, University of Manchester; UK blogger (normblog)
- Humphrey Gibbs (1902–1990), GCVO, KCMG, farmer, Governor of the colony of Southern Rhodesia (1959–1970)
- Precious Gondwe (born 1987), lawyer and businesswoman
- Carole Gray (born 1938), dancer and film actress
- Teenage Hadebe (born 1995), footballer
- Elizabeth Haran (born 1954), Australian novelist
- James G. Haskins (1914–1990), politician and businessman
- Charles Helm (1844–1915), missionary
- Graeme Hick (born 1966), Zimbabwean-born English cricketer
- Jason Hitz (born 1980), cricketer and rugby union player
- David Houghton (born 1957), former Zimbabwean cricketer and coach of Zimbabwean cricket team
- Derek Hudson (1934–2005), conductor
- Susan Huggett (born 1954), field hockey player
- Kubi Indi, development activist and businesswoman
- Hank Irvine (born 1943), tennis player
- Tendayi Jembere, actor
- Graham Johnson (born 1950), pianist, recognised as one of the world's leading vocal accompanists; world authority on the song repertoire
- Tony Johnstone (born 1956), golfer
- Heinrich Karlen (1922–2012), Swiss Prelate of the Roman Catholic Church
- Watson Khupe (1962/1963–2022), activist and politician
- Thokozani Khuphe (born 1963), politician, trade unionist and the President of the MDC-T breakaway faction of the Movement for Democratic Change
- Giovanni Matteo Konings (died 1929), prelate of the Roman Catholic Church
- Hilda Kuper (1911–1992), social anthropologist
- Felisitus Kwangwa (born 1995), netball player
- Paul Le Roux (born 1972), programmer, former criminal cartel boss, and informant to the US Drug Enforcement Administration
- Doris Lessing (1919–2013), novelist, recipient of the Nobel Prize in Literature
- John Love (1924–2005), Formula One driver and team owner
- David Lowe (born 1960), retired butterfly and freestyle swimmer
- Precious Lunga (born 1974), epidemiologist, entrepreneur, and CEO/co-founder of Baobab Circle
- Hector Macdonald (1915–2011), judge
- Phineas Makhurane (1939–2018), academic and chairman of the Zimbabwe National Council for Higher Education
- Charles Manyuchi (born 1989), boxer
- Dorothy Masuka (1935–2019), singer
- Muchadeyi Masunda (born 1952), businessman and politician
- Isabella Matambanadzo (born 1973), writer, gender and feminist activist
- Judah Mazive (born 1998), rugby league footballer
- John McChlery, mayor of Bulawayo and later member of the Southern Rhodesian Legislative Council for Marandellas in the early 20th century
- Ian McIntosh (1938–2023), rugby union coach
- Peter Foster (1916-1976), All round Sportsman - National colours for Rugby, Water Polo, Swimming and Boxing. Including South African Heavyweight Boxing Champion.
- Patricia McKillop (born 1956), field hockey player
- Dianna Melrose (born 1952), British diplomat who has served as the British High Commissioner to Tanzania and as the British Ambassador to Cuba
- Mary Metcalfe (born 1954), politician, educator, and academic
- Keegan Meth (born 1988), professional cricketer
- Cont Mhlanga (1957/1958–2022), playwright and founder of Amakhosi Theater
- Vusa Mkhaya (born 1974), singer and songwriter
- Raj Modi (born 1959), businessman and politician
- Daniel Molokele (born 1975), pro-democracy human rights lawyer
- Chido Cleopatra Mpemba (born 1988), Special Envoy for Youth at the African Union Commission
- David Mungoshi (1949–2020), novelist, actor, poet and teacher
- August Musarurwa (born 1968), composer of the tune "Skokiaan"
- Tsitsi Muzenda (born 1950), politician, senator of Midlands Province and daughter of the former Vice-President of Zimbabwe, Simon Muzenda
- Benjani Mwaruwari (born 1978), footballer and former Zimbabwe team captain; also played for Portsmouth FC
- Marvelous Nakamba (born 1994), footballer in the Premier League for Aston Villa and the Zimbabwe national team; born in Hwange, but raised in Bulawayo
- Cleopas Ncube (born 1983), wrestler
- Japhet Ndabeni Ncube, politician
- Pius Ncube (born 1946), Roman Catholic archbishop
- Trevor Ncube (born 1962), entrepreneur
- Callistus Ndlovu (1936–2019), academic, diplomat, and politician
- Lindela Ndlovu (died 2015), biochemist and Vice-Chancellor of the National University of Science and Technology
- Peter Ndlovu (born 1973), footballer, former Zimbabwe team captain; considered to be the best Zimbabwean player of all time
- Lazarus Nkala (1927–1975), trade union leader, activist, and revolutionary
- John Nkomo (1934–2013), politician
- Ian Noble (born 1972), rugby union and rugby league footballer
- Lewin Nyatanga (born 1988), Zimbabwean-born Welsh footballer
- Terence Parkin (born 1980), swimmer
- Virginia Phiri (born 1954), feminist writer
- Alexander Pines (born 1945), professor of chemistry, University of California, Berkeley
- Nick Price (born 1957), former world number one golfer, World Golf Hall of Fame member
- Clive Puzey (born 1941), racing driver
- Jeremy Railton (1944–2025), art director, costume and production designer
- Zoe Ramushu (born 1990), writer, director, producer, actress and multimedia journalist
- Surendran Reddy (1962–2010), musician, composer and performer
- Leo Cardwell Ross (1910–1975), Secretary for Information, Immigration and Tourism in the Rhodesian Government 1965–1972
- Daniel Rowland (born 1984), long-distance trail runner
- Rozalla (born 1964), dance music performer
- Irene Sabatini (born 1967), fiction author
- Sabrina (born 1969), pop singer
- Robin Sampson (born 1940), archer
- Ron Sandler (born 1952), CEO of Lloyd's of London; chairman of Northern Rock Bank
- Allan Savory (born 1935), biologist
- Adolph Schmitt (1905–1976), German prelate of the Roman Catholic Church
- Shingai Shoniwa (born 1981), rock musician
- Ernest Sibanda (born 1925), either the first or one of the first black members of the Church of Jesus Christ of Latter-day Saints in what is today Zimbabwe
- Ryan Sissons (born 1988), triathlete
- Bobby Skinstad (born 1976), rugby union player
- Alexander McCall Smith (born 1948), CBE, FRSE, writer and Emeritus Professor of Medical Law at the University of Edinburgh, Scotland; author of The No. 1 Ladies' Detective Agency series
- David Smith (born 1957), rugby union footballer
- Joseph Sonnabend (1933–2021), physician, researcher, part of the team which discovered interferon
- Yolanda Sonnabend (1935–2015), theatre and ballet designer and painter, primarily of portraits
- Buffalo Souljah (born 1983), reggae recording artist and songwriter
- Heath Streak (1974–2023), cricketer and former captain of Zimbabwe team; current bowling coach of the Bangladesh team
- Wally Stuttaford, politician
- Gavin Sutherland (born 1979), archer
- Robert Clarkson Tredgold (1899–1977), barrister, judge and politician
- Novuyo Tshuma (born 1988), writer and professor of creative writing
- Zeb Tsikira, real estate entrepreneur living in Canada; author
- Graeme Turner (born 1964), cricketer
- Yung Tyran, rapper, singer, songwriter, record producer
- Deandra van der Colff (born 1993), swimmer
- Des van Jaarsveldt (born 1929), rugby union player
- Jaggie van Staden (born 1942), boxer
- Yvonne Vera (1964–2005), award-winning author
- Wayne Visser (born 1970), writer, speaker, film producer, academic, editor of poetry, social entrepreneur and futurist focused on sustainable development, corporate social responsibility and creating integrated value
- Pat Walkden (born 1946), tennis player
- Maureen Thelma Watson (1925–1994), politician
- Nicola Watson (born 1955), accountant and politician
- Mike Williams (born 1991), rugby player
- Sean Williams (born 1986), Zimbabwean cricketer
- Zwelibanzi Moyo Williams (born 1977), chef and restauranteur
- Archibald Wilson (1921–2014), fighter pilot who served in the Royal Air Force during World War II
- Peter Wilson (born 1944), first-class cricketer and field hockey player
- Nitefreak (born 1991), DJ and music producer
