= 2007 Zimbabwean political crisis =

A political crisis began in Zimbabwe on 11 March 2007 when opposition leader Morgan Tsvangirai was beaten and tortured after being arrested, prompting widespread domestic and international criticism.

== Timeline ==
- 14 March: Two female officers were seriously injured in a fire-bomb attack on a police station in Harare; the government blamed the opposition Movement for Democratic Change (MDC). Similar attacks and other forms of protest took place in other parts of the country.
- 15 March: President Robert Mugabe made a statement about Western criticism of his regime: "When they criticise the government when it tries to prevent violence and punish perpetrators of that violence we take the position that they can go hang."
- 17 March: Four ranking members of the opposition were refused permission to leave the country, some of them seeking treatment for injuries inflicted in police custody. MP Nelson Chamisa said he was beaten at Harare Airport; doctors later reported that he had received a fractured skull.
- 21 March: Levy Mwanawasa, president of neighbouring Zambia, likened the situation in Zimbabwe "to a sinking Titanic whose passengers are jumping out in a bid to save their lives".
- 21 March: The United States Ambassador to Zimbabwe, Christopher Dell, said that the country's people had "turned a corner" and were "losing their fear".
- 22 March: The Roman Catholic Archbishop of Bulawayo, Pius Ncube, called for mass public protests to bring pressure to bear on President Robert Mugabe to resign.
- 23 March: The Prime Minister of Australia John Howard called for the world to work towards ousting Mugabe.
- 28 March: Morgan Tsvangirai was arrested in a raid on his headquarters.
- 29 March: The Southern African Development Community held a summit in Tanzania, with the Zimbabwe crisis high on its agenda.
- 8 April: Zimbabwe's Roman Catholic bishops call on the President of Zimbabwe Robert Mugabe to stand down or face "open revolt" in a message posted on church bulletin boards across the country.

== Bibliography ==
- Davoodi, Schoresch & Sow, Adama: Democracy and Peace in Zimbabwe in: EPU Research Papers: Issue 12/08, Stadtschlaining 2008
