= Isabella Matambanadzo =

Zimbabwean writer (born 1973)

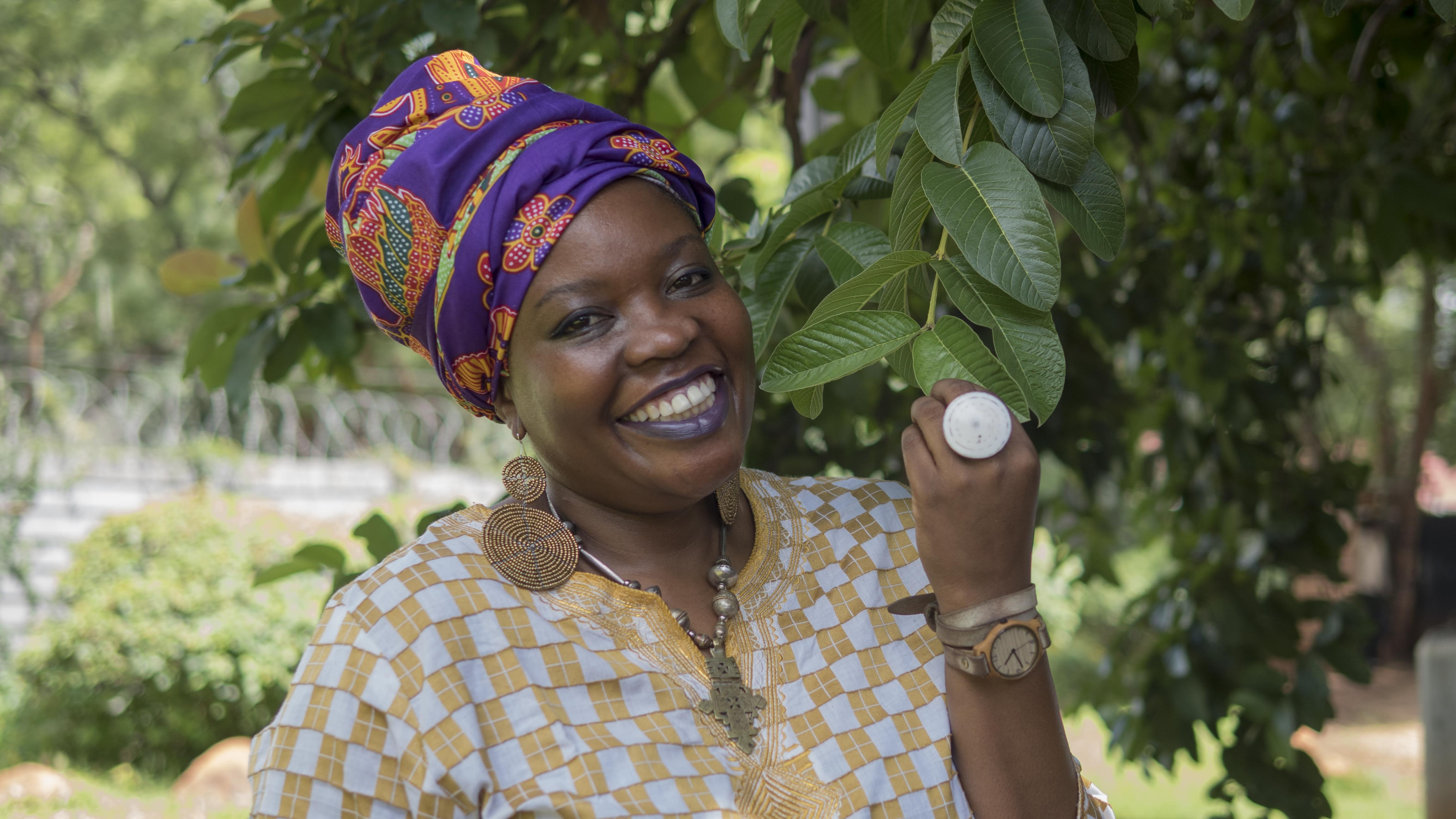
- Born: 5 June 1973 (age 53); Pelandaba, Zimbabwe
- Occupation: Writer

Isabella (Bella) Matambanadzo (born 5 June 1973) is a Zimbabwean writer, gender and feminist activist active with the African Feminist Forum. With a background in print, radio and television Journalism, she has used media to amplify women's voices. She also has a background in reporting on breaking news stories in and around Africa having previously worked with Reuters News Agency from 1999 to 2001.

== Early life and education ==
Isabella Matambanadzo was born on 5 June 1973 to Paul and Creacie Matambanadzo in the industrial suburb of Pelandaba, Bulawayo, Zimbabwe. She is the first of four children. Her early years were spent with her mother and grandmother who introduced her to feminism. Their family moved to Highfield, Harare, where she attended primary and Secondary School. In 1994 she attained a Diploma from the Zimbabwe Institute of Public Relations and went on to attain a National Diploma in Mass Communications at the Harare Polytechnic in 1995. She graduated from Rhodes University with a summa cum laude BA in journalism, literature and theatre studies in April 1999.

== Career ==
From 1999 to 2001, Matambanadzo co-produced, scripted, edited and 156 episodes of the weekly KiSwahili, French and English news features television show Africa Journal for Reuters News Agency.

From 2003 to 2007 she was a member of the United Nations Secretary-General's Task Force on Women, Girls and HIV/AIDS in Southern Africa. Her reports and contributions along with those of other members are collectively published as Facing the Future Together: Report of the United Nations Secretary-General's Task Force on Women, Girls and HIV/AIDS in Southern Africa.

In 2004 and 2006, Matambanadzo was an interviewer, photographer and researcher for Dr Kaori Izumi on Women's Land and Property Rights in Southern Africa. The report was published by the FAO Sub-Regional Office for Southern and East Africa.

From 2004 to 2009, she served as a board member for Radio VOP. On 24 January 2006, Matambanadzo and five other trustees from Radio VOP Zimbabwe were arrested on charges of operating without a licence. She noted that it was to prevent independent coverage of events in Zimbabwe. At that time, Zimbabwe was undergoing severe political instability and harassment and intimidation of independent press was popular. They were soon released on bail and their hearing was postponed until 25 September 2006, when charges were eventually dropped. Matambanadzo and other members started activism around press freedom. For her work, she was recognized as one of the 11 Front Line Women Human Rights Defenders 2007 by Amnesty International.

Matambanadzo continues to be involved in lobbying for gender and women's rights in areas of displacement, statelessness and child rights. On the issue of modern-day slavery, the Financial Gazette (Zimbabwe) noted that Matambanadzo urged government to escalate diplomatic pressure on Kuwait to account for the whereabouts of every single Zimbabwean woman who had been trafficked to Kuwait. She also has lobbied Zimbabwean government for women's equal participation in politics.

== Publications ==
1994	Women and Development in SADC (magazine supplement), co-author and co-editor, SADC Press Trust, 1994, a special publication distributed at the Dakar Africa Continental and Beijing United Nations International Fourth World Conference on Women's Rights.
1996	Beyond Beijing: Strategies and Visions towards Women’s Equality, co-author and co-editor, SADC Press Trust, 1996.
1999 to 2001	Co-produced, scripted, edited and 156 episodes of the weekly KiSwahili, French and English news features television show Africa Journal for Reuters News Agency
2002	Gender and HIV and AIDS: A Gender Audit of the National Aids Trust Fund, Harare, Zimbabwe – Co-contributor, published by the ZWRCN.
2003	Co-contributor: Africa case studies on Gender and Budgets – Supporting Resources Collections Institute of Development Studies, University of Sussex.
2003 to 2007	Member: United Nations Secretary-General's Task Force on Women, Girls and HIV/AIDS in Southern Africa, report collectively produced through contributors from southern Africa region published as Facing the Future Together: Report of the United Nations Secretary-General's Task Force on Women, Girls and HIV/AIDS in Southern Africa.
2005	Commonwealth Foundation: United Kingdom Contributor for East and Southern Africa case studies: Multi stakeholder Partnerships for Gender Equality.
2005	Beyond Inequalities 2005, Women in Zimbabwe, published by Southern African Research and Documentation Centre (SARDC) Women in Development Southern Africa Awareness, co-contributor, co-author.
2006	Rhodes Journalism Review # 26: September 2006 the Radio Voice of the People Experience.
2004 and 2006	Interviewer, Photographer and Researcher for Dr Kaori Izumi, Women's Land and Property Rights in Southern Africa: co-researcher, conference co-organizer. Report compiled and published by the UN FAO Sub-Regional. Office for Southern and East Africa Report published as Reclaiming Our Lives - HIV and AIDS, Women’s Land and Property Rights, and Livelihoods in Southern and East Africa: Narratives and Responses.
2007	"Media in the line of fire: where is justice?" Published in Open Space, journal of the Open Society Initiative for Southern Africa (OSISA), The Media: Expression and Freedom (Volume 1, no. 5)
2008	"Who Defends the Defenders?" In Open Society News: Challenges to Building Open Societies in Africa, published by the Open Society Foundations
2010	"Black Granite", in African Sexualities, edited by Dr Sylvia Tamale, Fahamu Books and Pambazuka Press, 2011.
2011	"The Missing", in the short story anthology Writing Free, Weaver Press, September 2011, Zimbabwe.
2012/13	"All The Parts of Mi", in the Caine Prize Anthology of short stories.
2014/15	"Message in a Bottle", in the short story anthology Writing Mystery and Mayhem, Weaver Press, September 2015, Zimbabwe.
2017	"A beautiful Strength – 80 years of women’s rights activism in Zimbabwe". Women's Coalition of Zimbabwe/Weaver Press – co editor/writer with Professor Rudo Gaidzanwa.
2019	"A Very Recent Tale", in New Daughters of Africa: An international anthology of writing by women of African descent, edited by Margaret Busby.
