= Johanna Decker =

German neurologist

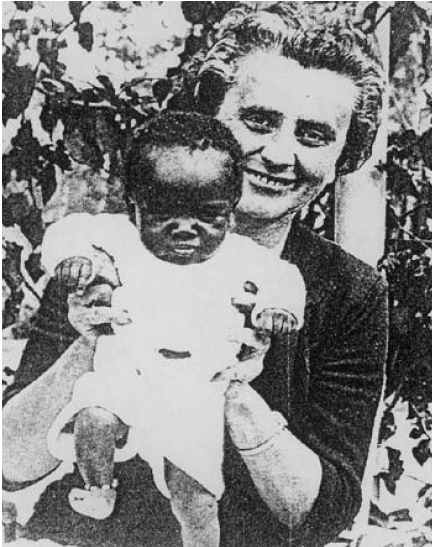

Johanna Decker (19 June 1918 – 9 August 1977) was a Roman Catholic missionary doctor from West Germany who was murdered in Rhodesia, during the Rhodesian Bush War.

== Life ==
=== Provenance and early years ===
Johanna Maria Katharina "Hanna" Decker was born in Nuremberg where Ignaz Decker (1876–1947), her father, worked as a tax and customs official. Her mother, born Maria-Anna Jäger, came originally from Tirschenreuth in the extreme east of Bavaria. In 1922 Ignaz Decker was transferred to nearby Amberg. It was here that Johanna attended the junior school and the Lyceum of the Poor School Sisters ("Lyzeum der Armen Schulschwestern ") between 1928 and 1934. The school has subsequently been renamed to celebrate its notable former pupil as the "Dr. Johanna Decker School". She was an exceptionally capable student, good at drawing and able to play the piano. It was still unusual for girls to attend a university, but after a further three years at the "Oberrealschule" (senior school) in Amberg she passed her Abitur (school final exams) in 1937, which opened the way to university-level education. She embarked on her medical studies at the Ludwig-Maximilians-Universität München in October 1937.

=== Career choice and training ===
Decker engaged actively in the church's youth work, and by 1939 the idea of joining the missionary medical service had matured in her mind. It was in 1939 that she signed up with the Missionary Medical Institute ("Missionsärztliches Institut Würzburg") in Würzburg, while continuing to pursue her medical studies at the Ludwig-Maximilians-Universität München. After her father's retirement the family moved to Heimstetten on the edge of Munich. As a student, for financial reasons, Hanna Decker continued to live with her parents. In 1942, at the height of the war, she passed her national medical exams and received her doctorate. She was then conscripted for work in a succession of hospitals and clinics, not necessarily working in her chosen disciplines. There was a year working in Obstetrics at a midwife training institution. In 1944 she moved to the main municipal hospital Mainz where initially she was assigned to the department for internal medicine. She was then transferred to a little 35-bed psychiatric section, set up with support from then local university, which in 1946 became a fully-fledged Psychiatric Clinic. In 1948, Decker qualified in Neuromedicine. Neurology and Psychiatry were not, at that time, treated as separate disciplines. In 1949 she set herself up as a psychiatric practitioner in Mainz (Stephanstraße 1).

On the Feast of the Epiphany in 1946 Hanna Decker had taken a solemn vow that once her medical studies were completed she would dedicate at least ten years to missionary work. In 1950 she was sent by the Missionary Medical Institute to Bulawayo, then part of the British colony of Southern Rhodesia. After arranging for a successor at her little surgery in the Stephanstraße, she left Mainz on 15 August. She stayed a couple of weeks in Würzburg and then took the train from Munich to Rome on 1 September 1950. With 24 other missionaries, on the morning of 6 September 1950 she enjoyed a private group audience with the pope. That afternoon she set off in a plane chartered by the missionary service. Stops along the way included (but were not limited to) Malta, Khartoum, Entebbe, Ndola and Johannesburg. They arrived in Bulawayo on 15 September 1950. Decker immediately joined the recently established (1948) Fatima Mission Hospital in a rural part of northern Matabeleland, roughly 130 miles / 200 km to the north-west of the city of Bulawayo. This is where her work was based till 1960.

=== Matabeleland: Fatima Mission Hospital ===
Throughout her time in Africa, she provided reports in letters to the Missionary Medical Institute in Würzburg about her activities and experiences. In her very first letter (which is undated) she reports that the most frequently encountered diseases are "Tropical Malaria", Biharzia, (unspecified) venereal diseases and deep Muscle abscesses ("tiefe Muskelabszesse"). There are case descriptions and glimpses of patients' attitudes. "Natives" did not appreciate the true worth of free drug/medicine-based treatment. Friends and relatives accompanying patients would sometimes report that a patient "spoke a different language" in cases of "exogenous psychosis" (possibly intoxication through Pneumonia/Sepsis). From the outset she reported good cooperation with the Mariannhill Missionaries (Note: Congregation of Mariannhill Missionaries / "CMM") from South Africa, and this was a recurring theme throughout her time at the Fatima Mission Hospital. Early on there are references to tensions with Roman Catholic Missionaries from Spain operating in the area, however.

The regular very detailed letters Decker sent to the MMI in Würzburg were supplemented by occasional articles for the MMI house magazine:

- "The rural Matabele are still cattle herders, also growing some maize/corn. They know nothing of beds or bath tubs. Illness is demonic, medical drugs magic. Their religion is based on fear of ancestors, their vision of life materialistic-fatalistic. ...
  Today people often walk miles - maybe simply for a spoon of cough syrop, because its effect is 'magical'. They expect that a single injection should cure a chronic illness, like Tuberculosis or the most severe stomach disorder. It is difficult to obtain a detailed medical history because the 'witch doctor' will know [without asking]. So on one occasion a 'witch doctor' colleague, on whom we had operated for a trapped inguinal hernia, confessed: I must be grateful to you, even if you are taking the bread from my mouth."

- "Die ländlichen Matabele sind noch Rinderhirten mit etwas Maisbau. Sie kennen weder Bett noch Badewanne. Ihr Krankheitsbegriff ist dämonisch, die Arzneiwirkung Magie, ihre Religion Ahnenfurcht, ihre Lebensanschauung materialistisch-fatalistisch. ...
  Heute kommen die Leute oft meilenweit zum Arzt gelaufen – vielleicht nur für einen Löffel Hustensaft, denn seine Wirkung ist „magisch“. Sie erwarten, dass eine einzige Injektion chronische Krankheiten, wie Tuberkulose oder schwerste Ernährungsstörungen, heilen soll. Es ist schwer, eine ausführliche Vorgeschichte zu bekommen, denn der Zauberdoktor muss wissen, nicht fragen. ... So hat mir einmal ein Zauberdoktor–Kollege, der wegen eines eingeklemmten Leistenbruches operiert wurde, gestanden: ich muss ihnen dankbar sein, auch wenn sie mir das Brot wegnehmen."
  Hanna Decker: "Die Situation des Missionsarztes", 1963

Decker herself divides her twenty-eight years as a missionary doctor into two phases. The first consists of building up the medical provision, involving pioneering work and plenty of "start-up difficulties": that is followed by a second phase of operating under the "more or less normal circumstances of a rural hospital". (She would never need to concern herself with a third phase of letting go after a lifetime's commitment.)

The pioneering build-up phase started with getting to know the local population, challenges of mutual understanding, the need for constant improvisation with regard to diagnoses and treatments, and above all shortages Addressing the shortages would involve adventurous and exhausting bus trips lasting several days, clutching the vital "medicines box", and often leaving her with the feeling of being "not so much a doctor as a salesman or woman, hawking goods and services from door to door". (Note: "...das Gefühl eines ärztlich unwürdigen Hausierertums, das seine Dienste und Ware feil bietet...")

After those set-up phases, the second phase she identified in her medical-missionary career was no less strenuous or demanding. On her letters to her family and her newsletters she provides a good picture of her daily life. Writing in 1972, Father Odilo Weeger of the CMM, who worked alongside her, recalled that "Ninety approved beds, hundreds and hundreds of outpatients and visits to the outlying clinics at regular intervals kept the energetic Dr.Decker very busy." Alongside the daily routines, in the evenings there were reports to be written and the accounts to be mainstained. There was virtually no free time. Nevertheless, writing to her parents in 1968 she was able to reassure them that "in the church we do indeed get a few hours to catch up with ourselves and also to think about the others". (Note: "In der Kirche sind ja die wenigen Stunden, wo wir einmal zu uns selber kommen und auch an die anderen denken") Occasional holidays, each lasting several weeks, took place every few years and were used to organise support, hold presentations or attend training courses. So these were not exactly holidays, and they also placed additional pressures on the colleague-doctor she left behind, unless a temporary locum doctor could be arranged.

=== Matabeleland: St. Paul's Mission Hospital ===
In 1960, Dekker moved to the St. Paul's mission station, still in northern Matabeleland, but on the other side of Lupane and approximately 40 miles / 75 km to the east of the Fatima Mission Hospital. There had been a "one teacher missionary school" at St. Paul's since 1952, staffed initially by an itinerant missionary, and during the subsequent eight years a certain amount of development had been undertaken. In 1953 a small dispensary was established, visited once a month (later once a week) by a doctor from the Fatima mission. In 1957/58 the dispensary became a clinic. The authorities now began insisting on a "European" nurse, but none was available. By 1960 a reliable water supply had been created with the digging of a borehole, and in 1959/60 Johanna Decker moved permanently to St.Paul's. Teaming up with CMM missionaries, she was mandated with turning the clinic into a 24-bed hospital. An x-ray machine was purchased in 1965. More buildings were added, with a dedicated maternity block opening in 1968 and new nurses accommodation in 1972/73, reflecting continuing expansion of facilities for inpatients, outpatients, and discharged inpatients still needing somewhere to convalesce safely before they could be fully discharged. The total cost of the building and the extensive surrounding infrastructure involved amounted to the equivalent of roughly 640,000 Marks, of which the West German government agreed to pay 75%, leaving Misereor, the charitable wing of the Roan Catholic church in Germany, to pay the balance.

Although the area was a rural one, there was a relatively large population to be looked after. According to one source Hanna Decker sometimes found herself as the only fully qualified medical doctor within a 100 kilometer radius. Nevertheless, from her correspondence it is clear that much of Dr. Decker's own workload was administrative rather than medical. Much of what she writes concerns personnel matters, building construction management and the permanently pressing problems of finance. There was also much preoccupation with transport challenges. There was a long wheelbase Land Rover which, especially in wet weather, was indispensable, but it also broke down frequently. Between 1964 and 1971 they had the use of a Volkswagen Beetle which could be used for shopping and deliveries. That was replaced by a Peugeot 204 "multi purpose vehicle" (station wagon?) which could also be used for local ambulance work, but not in "the bush". Once the initial start-up phase was completed, records show a local hospital staff comprising 10 nurses, 6–8 midwifery trainees and 15 care assistants. Sources refer to estimates that within the catchment area covered by the St. Paul's Mission Hospital there were between 40,000 and 60,000 people living. Statistics for 1972 show that the number of "approved beds" had by that time risen to 90, while the number of "actual" hospital beds was 122. That year records indicated there were 3,500 inpatients and 20,000 outpatients. In addition, extensive staff training programmes were operated in partnership with the Fatima Mission Hospital. Following all the investments, St. Paul's had by this time become the most "technically advanced" of all the hospitals.

On the early afternoon of 9 August 1977 two heavily armed "drunken terrorists" / "nationalist guerillas" forced their way through the hospital main door. On their way, they had already killed a senior worker, put out someone's eyes and beaten patients outside the hospital building. They found Dr. Decker and her Austrian-born colleague, Sister Ferdinanda Ploner, a recently arrived South African passport holder, examining and treating patients in the dispensary. They demanded money. Decker gave them the contents of the cash till, but this was insufficient so she told the attackers that she had more money in her house which she would go and collect. While Decker and Ploner were walking to the house the attackers shot them dead using Kalashnikovs. Later it was established that Johanna Decker had been killed by a single shot, Ploner's death involved eight shots. As the war intensified, the murder of Hanna Decker resonated widely in southern Africa and western Europe, putting an abrupt end to the history of the St. Paul's Mission Hospital.

== See also ==
- Adolph Schmitt
