= Cathedral Basilica of the Immaculate Conception (Bulawayo) =

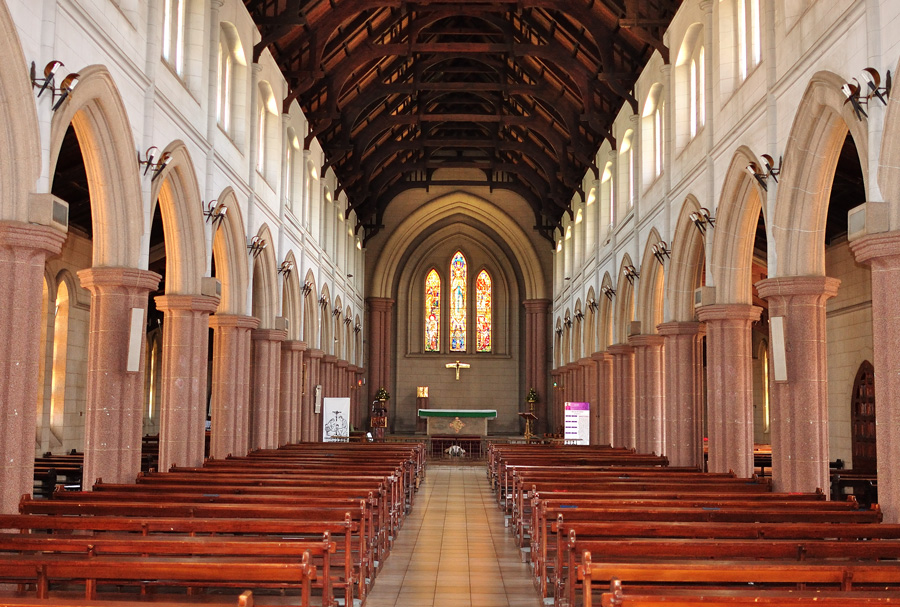
- The nave of St. Mary's Cathedral Basilica
- Cathedral Basilica of the Immaculate Conception
- 20.1550°S 28.5781°E
- Location: Bulawayo
- Country: Zimbabwe
- Denomination: Roman Catholic Church

History
- Events: Archbishop Ernst Heinrich Karlen

Clergy
- Archbishop: Archbishop Alex Thomas Kaliyanil

The Cathedral Basilica of the Immaculate Conception is the name given to a temple that is affiliated with the Catholic Church and serves as the seat of the Metropolitan Archbishop of Bulawayo in Zimbabwe. In addition, the June 21, 2013 by decree of Pope Francis was elevated to the status of Minor Basilica.

Its history dates back to the activities of the Jesuits, who in the mid-1890s had built a small chapel in Bulawayo between Main Street and 10th Avenue. Its first stone, imported from Croatia, was placed elsewhere by the apostolic prefect Bishop Sykes in 1903, it was opened on April 3, 1904, and later also served as pro-cathedral from 1920 until 1955 when he won the title of Cathedral. Pope John Paul II visited the cathedral in September 1988.

== Interior ==
The interior resembles a typical Gothic church with a nave and two lateral aisles. Its proportions are also Gothic: a long, narrow nave, an extremely high ceiling and the columns which rise up to pointed arches.

== See also ==
- Roman Catholicism in Zimbabwe
