= VOP =

VOP, Vop or VoP may refer to:

- velocity of propagation, electromagnetic signal speed
- Vop (river), a river in Smolensk Oblast, Russia
- Voice of Peace, an offshore radio station off the coast of Tel Aviv, active between 1973 and 1993. Resumed as online radio in 2009
- Voice of Prophecy, a US religious media ministry led by Shawn and Jean Boonstra
- Virginia Organizing Project, a grassroots community-empowerment organization
- Radio Voice of the People, a Zimbabwean radio station
- Violation of Probation, non-compliance with probation terms
- Voice of the People (website), South Korean online newspaper
- Variation of parameters, a method to solve linear differential equations
