= Prostitution in Zimbabwe =

Prostitution in Zimbabwe and related acts, including solicitation, procuring, and keeping a brothel, are illegal but thriving. Zimbabwe's dire economic situation has forced many women into sex work.

== History ==
In the 1890s the Second Boer War disrupted the sex trade in the gold-mining areas of Witwatersrand in South Africa, and the dispersal of the sex trade led to "urban problems" in what was then Southern Rhodesia. Public pressure led to the passage of immorality legislation in 1900.

Prior to independence (1980) colonial vagrancy laws were used against sex workers. In 1983 there was a major effort to eliminate sex work in post-independence Zimbabwe by rounding up hundreds of women and detaining them until they could prove they were not involved in the trade, otherwise they were sent to resettlement camps. A number of women's groups supported this as strengthening marriage.

As with many African countries, the onset of HIV/AIDS dramatically increased the interest in sex work.

== Law and politics ==
Prostitution is addressed in Part III of the Criminal Law (Codification and Reform) Act 2004.

The police can arrest any woman walking (in the streets) after 7pm.

In 2011 Thabita Khumalo, a MDC-T MP, proposed that prostitution in Zimbabwe be decriminalised. She stated that decriminalizing prostitution would address three important issues: corruption, HIV/Aids and women’s rights. Khumalo, who has suggested that the word prostitute be changed to pleasure engineer, has continued her campaign despite being demoted in her party in 2012. She has claimed her position on the issue may have contributed to this. She is supported by the Zimbabwe Women’s Resource Centre and Network (ZWRCN), in addition to sex workers themselves.

The UK based Open Society Foundations reported in 2012 that the police are the greatest abusers of sex workers in Zimbabwe.

== Sex trafficking ==
Zimbabwe is a source, transit, and destination country for women and children subjected to sex trafficking. Women and girls from Zimbabwean towns bordering South Africa, Mozambique, and Zambia are subjected to sex trafficking in brothels catering to long-distance truck drivers on both sides of the borders. Zimbabwean women and children are subjected to sex trafficking in cities and surrounding towns. Reports indicate that adults have recruited girls for child sex trafficking in Victoria Falls. The practice of ngozi, giving a family member to another family to avenge the spirits of a murdered relative, creates a vulnerability to trafficking.

Zimbabwean women are lured into hospitality largely in neighbouring countries and some women become victims of forced prostitution. Women are exploited in sex trafficking in Kuwait and Saudi Arabia. Many Zimbabwean adult and child migrants enter South Africa with the assistance of taxi drivers who transport them to the border at Beitbridge or nearby unofficial crossing locations and are subject to sex trafficking. Some of the migrants are transferred to criminal gangs that subject them to forced prostitution in Musina, Pretoria, Johannesburg, or Durban. Refugees from Somalia and Democratic Republic of the Congo reportedly travel from Zimbabwe’s Tongogara Refugee Camp to Harare, where they are forced into prostitution.

The United States Department of State Office to Monitor and Combat Trafficking in Persons ranks Zimbabwe as a 'Tier 2 Watch List' country.

== See also ==
- Prostitution in Africa

== Sources ==
=== Media ===
- Harare elite driven into prostitution. Guardian Oct 17 2004
- Teachers sell sex to buy food as Mugabe cronies get richer. Times June 1 2007
- Zimbabwe clamps down on male hookers. New Zimbabwe 11/12/2009
- The tougher side of prostitution. News Day Jan 12 2013
- Herald, The. "Unpacking law on prostitution . . .Women have the same right to Freedom of Movement as men". The Herald.
- Zimbabwe Sex Workers Alliance Shadow Report
- ""Even though we are sex workers, we're still people": living the harsh reality of sex work in Zimbabwe". UNIAIDS. 2 June 2021.
- Moyo, von Jeffrey (15 February 2021). "Hunger and poverty make young girls sell their bodies". Engagement Global.
- Mutsaka, Farai (June 17, 2020). "Zimbabwe's sex workers on streets despite virus restrictions". AP NEWS. AP NEWS.

=== Reports ===
- Moyo, Sam. The prostitution question: With special reference to Zimbabwe. Zimbabwe Institute of Development Studies (Harare) 1991
- Mazvarirwofa, Kudzai (January 27, 2022). "Sex Work During the Pandemic Becomes Even More Dangerous". Global Press Journal.
- "Hands Off II: reducing violence against sex workers". aidsfond.

=== Books ===
- Magaisa, Ishmael (2001). "Prostitution, patriarchy and marriage; A Zimbabwean case study". In Rwomire, Apollo (ed.). African Women and Children: Crisis and Response. Greenwood Publishing Group. pp. 127–142. ISBN 9780275962180.
- Ncube, Welshman (1989). Family law in Zimbabwe. Legal Resources Foundation. ISBN 9780908312016.
- G. Feltoe. A guide to the criminal law of Zimbabwe. Legal Resources Foundation, 2004

=== Law ===
- CRIMINAL LAW (CODIFICATION AND REFORM) ACT 2004
