= Bulawayo South =

- National Assembly constituency for the Parliament of Zimbabwe
- District: Bulawayo
- Province: Bulawayo
- Electorate: 24,024 (2023)

Current constituency
- Created: 1914
- Number of members: 1
- Party: ZANU–PF
- Member: Raj Modi

Bulawayo South is a constituency represented in the National Assembly of the Parliament of Zimbabwe, located in Bulawayo. Its current MP since a 2023 by-election is Raj Modi of ZANU–PF. Notable former MPs for the constituency include Eddie Cross and David Coltart.

== Profile ==
Bulawayo South is on the southern end of the city of Bulawayo. It is a predominantly black working-class area, with some middle- and upper-class areas. Roughly 85% of the inhabitants of the constituency are Ndebele-speaking and roughly 10% of the constituency is Shona-speaking. There are also several thousand white Zimbabweans and Indian Zimbabweans who live in the constituency as well. The working class area is centered around the Bulawayo suburbs of Sizinda, Tshabalala, and Sidojiwe (Flats), and factories as well as other industrial buildings can be found in the Belmont and Donnington industrial area. To the south, the constituency has suburbs Montrose, Newton West, Morningside, Southworld, West Somerton, and Barham Green. Prior to the 1990 election the constituency was one of the 20 white minority constituencies. The constituency has developed into a stronghold of ZANU-PF and Robert Mugabe opposition. The MDC has become a dominant presence in Bulawayo South and in 2000 saw the ZANU-PF candidate suffer a heavy loss of 51.6% of the vote. In the 2005 election, however, the ZANU-PF made a small but significant gain, while the MDC lost over 8,000 votes due in large part to poor voter turnout in the 2005 general election. The decline in support from 2005 to 2000 can also be attributed to constituency redistricting. David Coltart has remained a key member of the MDC as one of its highest-ranking members. Coltart is currently the MDC's Secretary for Legal Affairs and the Shadow Minister for Justice and Legal Affairs.

== History ==
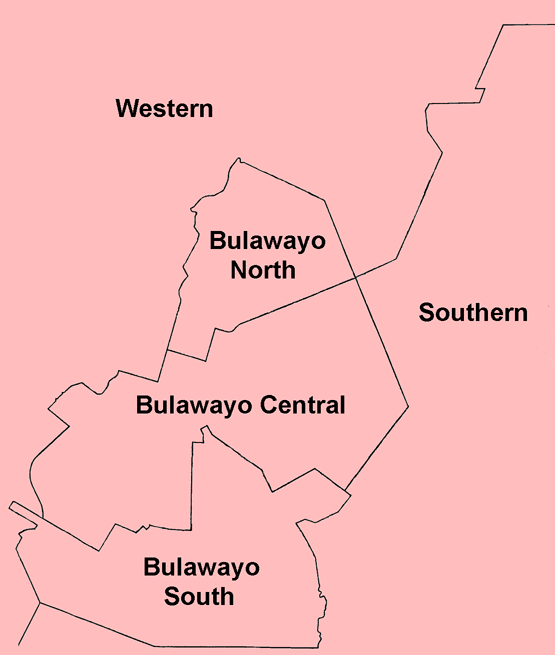
Map of the white Bulawayo South constituency (1979-1987)

In the 2023 general election, Nicola Watson of the Citizens Coalition for Change defeated the incumbent MP, Raj Modi of ZANU–PF. On 9 October 2023, Watson was recalled from Parliament along with 14 other CCC MPs after the party's purported interim secretary-general, Sengezo Tshabangu, wrote to Speaker Jacob Mudenda informing him that Watson and the other MPs had been expelled from the party. A by-election, in which Watson was barred from running, was held on 9 December 2023, in which Modi was reelected to the seat.

== Members ==
Election	Name	Party
1914	Gordon Forbes	
1920	Francis Hadfield	Ind. Labour
1924	Charles Folliot Birney	Rhodesia Party
1924	Henry Robert Barbour	Rhodesia Party
1928	Harry Davies	Labour
1933	Harry Davies	Labour
1934	Harry Davies	Labour
1939	Donald MacIntyre	Labour
1946	James Stuart McNeillie	Labour
1948	Henry Alfred Holmes	United
1954	John Wrathall	United Federal
1958	Benny Goldstein	United Federal
1962	John Phillips	Rhodesian Front
1965	John Phillips	Rhodesian Front
1970	Arthur McCarter	Rhodesian Front
1974	Ian Rees-Davies	Rhodesian Front
1977	Desmond Chalmers	Rhodesian Front
1979	Wally Stuttaford	Rhodesian Front
1980	Wally Stuttaford	Rhodesian Front
1982 by-election	Bob Nixon	Independent
1985	Graham Austen Biffen	CAZ
1990	Lot Senda	ZANU–PF
1995	Zenzo Nsimbi	ZANU–PF
2000	David Coltart	MDC
2005	David Coltart	MDC
2008	Eddie Cross	MDC–T
2013	Eddie Cross	MDC–T
2018	Raj Modi	ZANU–PF
2023	Nicola Watson	CCC
2023 by-election	Raj Modi	ZANU–PF

== Election results ==
=== 2000s ===
General Election 2008: Bulawayo South
Party	Candidate	Votes	%	±%
MDC–T	Eddie Cross	2,764	55	−20.8
MDC-M	Jethro Mpofu	1,605	32	+32
ZANU–PF	Jimmy Nleya	483	9.6	−17
Independent	Marylin Ndiweni	112	2.2	N/A
United People's Party (Zimbabwe)	Tobias Kamambo	58	1.2	N/A
Patriotic Union of MaNdebeleland	Wilson Bancinyane	0	0.0	N/A
Majority		1,159	23	−29.2
Turnout		5,022	21.6	−14.8
MDC–T hold		Swing		

General Election 2005: Bulawayo South
Party	Candidate	Votes	%	±%
MDC	David Coltart	12,120	75.8	−8.9
ZANU–PF	Sithembiso Nyoni	3,777	23.6	+10.6
Independent	Charles Mpofu	84	0.5	N/A
Majority		8,343	52.2	−19.5
Turnout		15,981	36.4	+0.6
MDC hold		Swing		

General Election 2000: Bulawayo South
Party	Candidate	Votes	%	±%
MDC	David Coltart	20,781	84.7	N/A
ZANU–PF	Callistus Ndlovu	3,193	13.0	−51.6
Independent	Others	552	2.2	N/A
Majority		17,588	71.7	
Turnout		24,526	35.8	
MDC gain from ZANU–PF		Swing		

=== 1990s ===
General Election 1995: Bulawayo South
Party	Candidate	Votes	%	±%
ZANU–PF	Zenzo Nsimbi	15,631	64.6	N/A
Forum Party of Zimbabwe	Ega Sansole	8,558	35.4	N/A
ZANU–PF hold		Swing		

=== 1980s ===
General Election 1985: Bulawayo South
Party	Candidate	Votes	%	±%
CAZ	Graham Austen Biffen	1,354	74.9	−17.1
IZG	Robert Graeme Nixon	454	25.1	N/A
CAZ hold		Swing		

General Election 1980: Bulawayo South
Party	Candidate	Votes	%	±%
RF	Wallace Evelyn Stuttaford	3,715	92.0	N/A
Independent	Francis Robert Bertrand	289	7.2	N/A
Independent	John Francis Betch	36	0.9	N/A
RF hold		Swing		

=== 1970s ===
General Election 1979: Bulawayo South
Party	Candidate	Votes	%	±%
RF	Wallace Evelyn Stuttaford	4,140	88.1	N/A
Independent	Francis Robert Bertrand	500	10.7	N/A
Independent	John Francis Betch	57	1.2	N/A
Majority		3,640	77.5	−13.0
Turnout		4,697		
RF hold		Swing		

General Election 1977: Bulawayo South
Party	Candidate	Votes	%	±%
RF	George Desmond Chalmers	701	95.2	N/A
RAP	Ian Norman Berry	35	4.8	N/A
Majority		666	90.5	
Turnout		736	69.5	
RF hold		Swing		

== See also ==
- List of Zimbabwean parliamentary constituencies
