= Ernest Sibanda =

Zimbabwean Latter Day Saint (born 1925)

Ernest Tsikira Sibanda (born 25 December 1925) was either the first or one of the first black members of The Church of Jesus Christ of Latter-day Saints in what is today Zimbabwe.

== Biography ==
Ernest Tsikira Sibanda was born in Salisbury, Southern Rhodesia on 25 December 1925. He was raised in the Seventh-day Adventist Church by his father, who was a pastor in the church. Sibanda earned a Bachelor of Arts degree and a Bachelor of Science degree and trained to be a pastor in the Seventh-day Adventist Church. He was a pastor for three years, a teacher for nine years, and a headmaster of a school for fifteen years. He married his wife Priscilla in 1958 and eventually fathered three children.

In April 1976, during the Rhodesian Bush War, Sibanda's house was burned by Zimbabwe African National Union guerrillas who accused him of being an informant for the mostly white Rhodesian government. Sibanda and his wife walked from Salisbury to Bulawayo to try to escape hostilities.

In December 1978, Sibanda met missionaries for The Church of Jesus Christ of Latter-day Saints while working in Bulawayo. After reading from the Book of Mormon, Sibanda resolved to be baptized into the LDS Church, and he was baptized within 4 weeks of first meeting the missionaries. A few weeks later, in early 1979, Sibanda's wife was baptized into the church. Sibanda was the first black person to become a member of the LDS Church in Rhodesia. At the time Rhodesia was part of the South African mission and his baptism in Rhodesia preceded any post-1978 revelation baptisms of black people in South Africa itself. His progress and baptism were closely monitored by the mission president, and was one of the key factors in moving forward with the baptism in 1980 of Moses Mahlangu and some of his associates from Soweto. Sibanda was ordained a priest in the Aaronic priesthood a week after his baptism, and was later advanced to the Melchizedek Priesthood.

The Sibandas experienced some difficulties in being accepted by the white members of the LDS Church in Bulawayo, particularly when they were asked to serve in leadership callings in the church. Over the years Sibanda served in several callings including as branch Sunday School president, a counselor in a branch presidency and branch clerk.

Sibanda was asked by the president of the South Africa Johannesburg Mission of the church to translate some of the LDS Church hymns from English into the Shona language.

== Sources ==
E. Dale LeBaron (ed.) (1990). "All are Alike unto God": Fascinating Conversion Stories of African Saints (Salt Lake City, Utah: Bookcraft) pp. 125–132
