= Roy Bhila =

Zimbabwean politician

The Hon. Roy Bhila MP

Member of Parliament for Chiredzi North
- Incumbent
- Assumed office 26 August 2018
- President: Emmerson Mnangagwa
- Minister: Sithembiso Nyoni
- Preceded by: Robert Mukwena
- Constituency: Chiredzi North
- Majority: 16,112 (75.7%)

Deputy Minister of Industry and Commerce
- In office 18 September 2023 – 30 November 2023
- President: Emmerson Mnangagwa
- Preceded by: Raj Modi
- Succeeded by: Raj Modi

Personal details
- Born: 25 February 1980 (age 46) Chipinge
- Party: ZANU-PF

Roy Bhila is a Zimbabwean politician. He is the former Deputy Minister of Industry and Commerce of Zimbabwe, and a current member of parliament. He is the member of ZANU–PF.
