= Eddie Cross =

Zimbabwean economist

Member of the House of Assembly of Zimbabwe for Bulawayo South
- In office 2008–2018
- President: Robert Mugabe
- Prime Minister: Morgan Tsvangirai
- Preceded by: David Coltart
- Succeeded by: Raj Modi

Personal details
- Born: Edward Graham Cross; 1940 (age 85–86) Bulawayo, Southern Rhodesia
- Party: MDC-T
- Spouse: Jeanette
- Children: 2

Edward Graham "Eddie" Cross (born 1940) is a Zimbabwean former Member of Parliament for Bulawayo South. He is also an economist and founding member of the mainstream Movement for Democratic Change party formerly led by Nelson Chamisa. At one point, he was the Policy Coordinator General.

== Pre-independence ==
Cross's career has been mainly in agriculture. He attended Gwebi College and then worked for the government on land resettlement in the Gokwe district before attending the University of Rhodesia in Salisbury where he received an honours degree in economics. After that he worked as an economist, eventually becoming chief economist at the Agricultural Marketing Authority in 1976. He was opposed to white minority rule during the Rhodesian Prime Minister Ian Smith era.

== Independence ==
After the internationally recognised independence of Zimbabwe in 1980, Cross was appointed first to head the Dairy Marketing Board and then the Cold Storage Commission. The CSC was the largest meat-marketing organisation in Africa. He was subsequently CEO of the Beira Corridor Group, which promoted the rehabilitation of the Beira Corridor as an export outlet to the sea for land locked Zimbabwe.

On 10 February 2009, Tsvangirai designated Cross for the position of Minister of State Enterprise and Parastatals as part of the national unity government. He was, however, dropped from the Cabinet list and replaced prior to the Cabinet's swearing in.

== Family ==
He is married to Jeanette and has two children, Gary and Susan, who between them have given him 5 grandchildren, 4 girls and 1 boy.
