= Sizane Secondary School =

School in Zimbabwe

Information
- School type: High school
- Religious affiliation(s): AME Church (since 1984)
- Established: 1963; 62 years ago
- Founders: Society of Women of Southern Rhodesia
- Website: sizanehighame.ac.zw

Sizane High School is a high school that is located in the suburb of Pelandaba, Bulawayo, Zimbabwe. It was established in 1963 by the Society of Women of Southern Rhodesia under Lady Edna Caddick's supervision and was gifted to the AME Church in 1984.

The school has produced many notable people in history of Zimbabwe since the 1980s. The school is most notably for high grades and does Zimbabwe Schools Examination Councils Syllabus. Joshua Nkomo once praised the school for good education and high standard of sports offered. The school has also won a number of the Merit awards from the ministry of Education, Sports, Arts and Culture 1992, 2006 and 2010 respectively. The current head is Mr Khumbulani Sibanda. An African Methodist Episcopal Church dean, Rev Dr Deborah Manyoba who has been there for more than one and a half decades remains part of the board. The Residents of Pelandaba Highly praise it as one of the best high schools located in a lower class suburb. It is owned by the African Methodist Episcopal Church, which was founded in 1816 by Richard Allen.
