= E. Dale LeBaron =

Canadian academic (1934–2009)

Elwin Dale LeBaron (October 8, 1934 – December 3, 2009) was a Canadian scholar of the Latter Day Saint movement and a professor of Church History and Doctrine at Brigham Young University (BYU). He is known for his work on the history of the Church of Jesus Christ of Latter-day Saints (LDS Church) in Africa, where he served as mission president when the 1978 Revelation on Priesthood was announced and compiled hundreds of interviews from African locals.

== Biography ==
LeBaron was born in Taber, Alberta, Canada but grew up in nearby Barnwell, Alberta. As a young man, he served as an LDS missionary in South Africa and Zimbabwe from 1955 to 1958.

Receiving his B.A., M.S., and Ed.D. from BYU, LeBaron worked as a teacher and administrator for the Church Educational System in Alberta, Wyoming, and Utah. In 1972 he returned to Africa to organize LDS Seminaries and Institutes of Religion in South Africa. Following that assignment he was called as president of the South Africa Johannesburg Mission from 1976 to 1979. LeBaron was still serving as Mission President when the LDS Church announced the 1978 Revelation on Priesthood, which extended the priesthood to black people, the missionary work under LeBaron expanded dramatically. LeBaron also took other leadership roles in the LDS church as a bishop, high councilor, and stake president. On 3 December 2009, LeBaron died from injuries after being struck by an automobile not far from his home.

== Professional career ==
Funding was approved through the David M. Kennedy Center for International Studies at BYU for LeBaron to conduct interviews and collect oral histories and other documentation on the account of Africans in the LDS Church. He collected oral history interviews in about ten countries — South Africa, Zimbabwe, Ghana, Nigeria, Zaire, Ciskei, Transkei, Swaziland, and the island nations of Mauritius and Reunion — to preserve knowledge of the beginnings of the LDS Church there.

LeBaron collected more than 650 oral histories of African converts from 24 African nations. He gave presentations on the information he gathered and compiled a DVD of his interview experiences entitled Pioneers of Africa. He authored a book, All Are Alike Unto God, on African conversions. The book contained interviews with 23 black converts from South Africa, Zimbabwe, Nigeria, Ghana and Zaire, which were the first African countries to receive LDS missionaries.

After his work in Africa, LeBaron returned to his role as a professor of religion at BYU where he lectured from 1986 until 2001. Besides various publications relating to the LDS Church in Africa, LeBaron has also written a biography of Benjamin F. Johnson's life and edited a biography of Glen G. Fisher.

=== Published works ===
Articles/Chapters by E. Dale LeBaron.

- Elijah's Mission: His Keys, Powers, and Blessings from the Old Testament to the Latter Days from Sperry Symposium Classics: The Old Testament.
- 13. Ether and Mormon: Parallel Prophets of Warning and Witness from The Book of Mormon: Fourth Nephi Through Moroni, From Zion to Destruction.
- 23. Official Declaration 2: Revelation on the Priesthood from Sperry Symposium Classics: The Doctrine and Covenants.
- Preparing for Preaching the Gospel Worldwide since 1945 from Window of Faith: Latter-day Saint Perspectives on World History
- Revelation on the Priesthood, Thirty-Five Years Later from RE 14, no. 3 (2013)
- Perspectives from the Global Expansion of Latter-day Saint Religious Education from RE 17, no. 2 (2016)
- African converts without baptism: An inspiring chapter in church history (1998)
- All are alike unto God (1990)
- Benjamin F. Johnson: Friend to the prophets (1997)
- E. Dale Lebaron devotional 1998. (1998)
- Elijah's mission: His keys, powers, and blessings from the Old Testament to the latter days. (1993)
- E. Dale LeBaron oral history project on Africa
- Official Declaration 2: Revelation on the priesthood. (1992)
- Register to the African Oral History Project Interviews by E. Dale LeBaron : MSS 1937
- Revelation on the priesthood: The dawning of a new day in Africa (1989)
- The Book of Mormon: The pattern in preparing a people to meet the Savior. (1991)
- The church in Africa (2000)

== Bibliography ==
- "Dr. E. Dale LeBaron and Africa". BYU Broadcasting. BYU Broadcasting. Archived from the original on 6 January 2009.
- "E. Dale LeBaron". Cedar Fort Beta Site. Cedar Fort. Archived from the original on 1 January 2009.
- Koepp, Paul. "BYU professor remembered for Africa work". Deseret News. Archived from the original on 16 February 2017.
- "Multicultural Canada".
- "New Mission Presidents Called". Ensign: 86. June 1976.
- "Obituary: E. Dale LeBaron". Deseret News. December 10, 2009. Archived from the original on August 13, 2018.
- "RSC Publications". BYU Religious Education:Religious Studies Center. Archived from the original on 7 November 2017.
- T, Jared. "E. Dale LeBaron, Former BYU Religion Professor, Killed in an Auto-Pedestrian Accident". Juvenile Instructor. Archived from the original on 15 June 2018.
- Warnock, Caleb (7 December 2009). "Pioneer of LDS missionary work in Africa killed in Orem accident". The Daily Herald. Archived from the original on 14 October 2011.
