= Zeb Tsikira =

Zimbabwean real estate entrepreneur

Zeb Tsikira is a Zimbabwean real estate entrepreneur living in Canada. He is also a book author.

== Background ==
Zeb Tsikira was born in Bulawayo where he grew up in Nketa suburb. He had his early education at Manondwane Primary School and high school at Hamilton Boys High School. He then relocated to Canada in 2001 with his family.

In 2010 Tsikira was expelled from the university where he was studying psychology at the University of Ottawa. He then established Canvestus Group and Nyon Communications in 2013, specializing in real estate and property development. Tsikira was recognised at Zimbabwe Achievers Awards 2019 as Male entrepreneur of the year.

He is a contributing donor to L'Arche Zimbabwe and is involved in music production in Zimbabwe.

== Books ==
- Tsikira, Zeb; Tsikira, Colleen (2020). You Can't Save Your Way To Wealth: How YOU can build generational wealth through real estate, take care of your immediate family and fund your retirement. Canvestus Group LTD.
- Tsikira, Zeb (2022). All or Nothing - the Zeb Tsikira story. ASIN B09SYTZJJ3.
