= Adolph Schmitt =

German prelate

The Most Reverend Adolph Schmitt C.M.M.
- Bishop emeritus of Bulawayo
- Province: Bulawayo
- Diocese: Bulawayo
- Appointed: 23 December 1950 (Vicar Apostolic)
- Installed: 1 January 1955 (Bishop)
- Term ended: 9 May 1974
- Predecessor: Ignatius Arnoz, CMM
- Successor: Ernst Heinrich Karlen, CMM
- Other post: Titular Bishop of Nasai

Orders
- Ordination: 19 March 1931
- Consecration: 2 April 1951 by Edward Mooney

Personal details
- Born: Adolph Gregory Schmitt; 20 April 1905 Rimpar, Kingdom of Bavaria
- Died: 5 December 1976 (aged 71) Lupane District, Matabeleland North, Rhodesia
- Denomination: Roman Catholic

Styles of Adolph Gregory Schmitt
- Reference style: The Most Reverend
- Spoken style: Your Excellency
- Religious style: Bishop

Adolph Gregory Schmitt, C.M.M. (20 April 1905 – 5 December 1976) was a German prelate of the Roman Catholic Church. He was killed by a black nationalist guerrilla during the Rhodesian Bush War in 1976.

== Biography ==
Adolph Schmitt was born in Rimpar, Germany, ordained a priest on 19 March 1931 from the religious order of the Congregation of Mariannhill Missionaries. On 23 December 1950 Schmitt was appointed Vicar Apostolic of the then Vicariate Apostolic of Bulawayo and ordained on 2 April 1951. He retired on 9 May 1974.

=== Death ===
During the Rhodesian Bush War, on 5 December 1976, Schmitt and two of his companions, a nun and a priest, were shot by a black nationalist guerrilla on the way to a hospital visit. The sole survivor of the attack, the nun, said that their car was stopped and the guerrilla demanded money but then opened fire with a machine gun.

== See also ==
- Archdiocese of Bulawayo
- Johanna Decker

Catholic Church titles
Preceded by Francis Martin Kelly	Titular Bishop of Nasai; 1950 - 1955	Succeeded by Alonso Silveira de Mello
Preceded by Ignatius Arnoz	Bishop of Bulawayo; 1955 - 1974	Succeeded by Ernst Heinrich Karlen
