= Nicola Watson =

Zimbabwean accountant and politician

Member of the National Assembly of Zimbabwe
- In office 2013 – 3 October 2023
- Preceded by: Dorcas Sibanda (Bulawayo Central); Raj Modi (Bulawayo South)
- Constituency: Bulawayo South (2023); Bulawayo Central (2018–2023); Women (2013–2018)

Personal details
- Born: Nicola Jane Watson; 10 July 1955 (age 71) Bulawayo, Matabeleland, Southern Rhodesia (now Zimbabwe)
- Party: Citizens Coalition for Change (2023)
- Other political affiliations: MDC (2000–2005); MDC–T (2005–2018); MDC Alliance (2018–2023)
- Education: University of Cape Town

Nicola Jane Watson (born 10 July 1955) is a Zimbabwean accountant and politician who served as a Member of the National Assembly of Zimbabwe from 2013 until 2023. She was first elected to one of the seats reserved for women, then as the MP for Bulawayo Central in 2018, before defeating the Zanu-PF incumbent Raj Modi in Bulawayo South in 2023.

== Early life ==
Nicola Watson was born on 10 July 1955 in Bulawayo, Matabeleland in what was then Southern Rhodesia. She attended Hillside Primary School and then Townsend Secondary School. She received her tertiary education at the University of Cape Town. Her mother served as an MP.

Watson joined the Movement for Democratic Change in 2000.

== Parliamentary career ==
In 2013, she became one of the designated women MPs elected through proportional representation. She was elected the MP for Bulawayo Central in 2018.

On 20 June 2023, Watson was announced as the Citizens Coalition for Change's candidate for Bulawayo South as healthcare practitioner Surrender Kapoikulu was selected by the party to contest Watson's Bulawayo Central constituency in the 2023 general elections.

The Bulawayo High Court nullified Watson and eleven other Bulawayo CCC parliamentary candidates' candidatures in a court judgement on 27 July 2023, ruling that their nomination papers were submitted after the 21 June deadline and the Zimbabwean Electoral Commission's decision to accept their nomination papers was null and void.

However, the Supreme Court set aside the High Court's decision on 3 August, allowing Watson and the other CCC candidates to contest their respective constituencies at the general election on 23 August. Watson went on to defeat the incumbent Zanu-PF MP for Bulawayo South, Raj Modi at the election.

On 3 October 2023, Sengezo Tshabangu wrote a letter to the speaker of the National Assembly Jacob Mudenda in which he purported to be the interim secretary-general of the CCC and notified Mudenda that Watson and fourteen other CCC MPs had been expelled from the party. The CCC dismissed Tshabangu's letter and denied that he was a party member. However, Mudenda acknowledged Tshabangu's letter and wrote to the electoral commission on 9 October and informed them that Watson and the fourteen other CCC MPs had ceased to be parliamentarians. On 5 November 2023, the Harare High Court threw out Watson and the other CCC MPs to be reinstated, meaning that a by-election was to be held in Watson's constituency. Watson filed to run in the by-election in her constituency on 9 December 2023 as a member of the CCC, however, the Harare High Court barred her from running on 7 December. She was succeeded by Raj Modi of ZANU–PF in the by-election.
