= Pelandaba =

Suburb of Bulawayo, Zimbabwe

Coordinates: 20°09′S 28°31′E

Pelandaba is a suburb of Bulawayo in Zimbabwe. It has nearly 30,000 residents as of 2007. It houses Sizane Secondary School, Induba Primary School and the house of late Joshua Nkomo, the former leader of Zimbabwe's African Peoples Union.

== Origins ==
The neighborhood was built in the 1950s as an "elite African community". J. H. Sobantu (who in the 1930s was "an emerging member of Southern Rhodesia's Westernized African elite"), was one of the chairmen of the residents' association. Its founding was the result of the boom in the Zimbabwe economy of the early 1950s, when the number of jobs as well as wages increased, a development from which Zimbabwe's black residents profited as well; moreover, labor unrests of the late 1940s showed the need for a more stable social situation. This led to a demand for better housing in better neighborhoods, and "both the government and employers began to pay more serious attention to the housing problems of urban blacks". Bulawayo, while opposing black landownership, "grudgingly introduced an African Home Ownership Scheme on a thirty-year leasehold basis". So, residents did not actually own the land on which they built "even the[ir] plushest houses": the 1930 Land Apportionment Act had reserved significant chunks of the country (the most fertile ones) to whites, including the white suburbs. The land on which Pelandaba (and the similar suburb Pumula) was built was leased from the city. The suburb proved successful enough in attracting the African elite (including such notables as Joshua Nkomo), and became "the trendiest black community in Bulawayo"; by 1957 its houses rivaled those of expensive white neighborhoods.

== Notable residents ==
Joshua Nkomo (1917–1999), Vice President of Zimbabwe and leader of the Zimbabwe African People's Union, resided in Pelandaba. Sikhanyiso Ndlovu (1937–2015), who served as Minister of Information and Publicity of Zimbabwe from 2007 to 2008, was the ZANU-PF candidate for the House of Assembly seat from the Pelandaba-Mpopoma constituency in the March 2008 parliamentary election. Isabella Matambanadzo (born 1973), a Zimbabwean writer and gender activist, was born in the industrial suburb of Pelandaba, Bulawayo.

== Amenities ==
Pelandaba houses Sizane Secondary School and Induba Primary School. Sizane Secondary School is located in the suburb and has been used as a venue for community sporting events, including the Joshua Mqabuko half-marathon.

== Recent history ==
In September 2023, a fire in Pelandaba destroyed property valued at ZWL$15 million. Bulawayo acting chief fire officer Linos Phiri stated that the fire was suspected to have been caused by an electrical fault and possible overloading of electrical circuits in a house occupied by six families.

In July 2024, residents of Pelandaba West raised concerns with the Bulawayo city council regarding outstanding drainage and sewer system works in the suburb. Ward 18 councillor Felix Takunda Madzana said residents had paid for services when they purchased stands but no one was taking responsibility for completing the works.

In August 2025, a 33-year-old man from Pelandaba West was shot and wounded by three unidentified assailants during an armed robbery in Bulawayo's central business district. Bulawayo province police spokesperson Inspector Nomalanga Msebele confirmed the incident and stated that the robbers escaped with US$4,000 and 60,000 rand.

== See also ==
- Land reform in Zimbabwe
