= David Coltart =

Zimbabwean lawyer, Christian leader and politician

The Right Honourable David Coltart
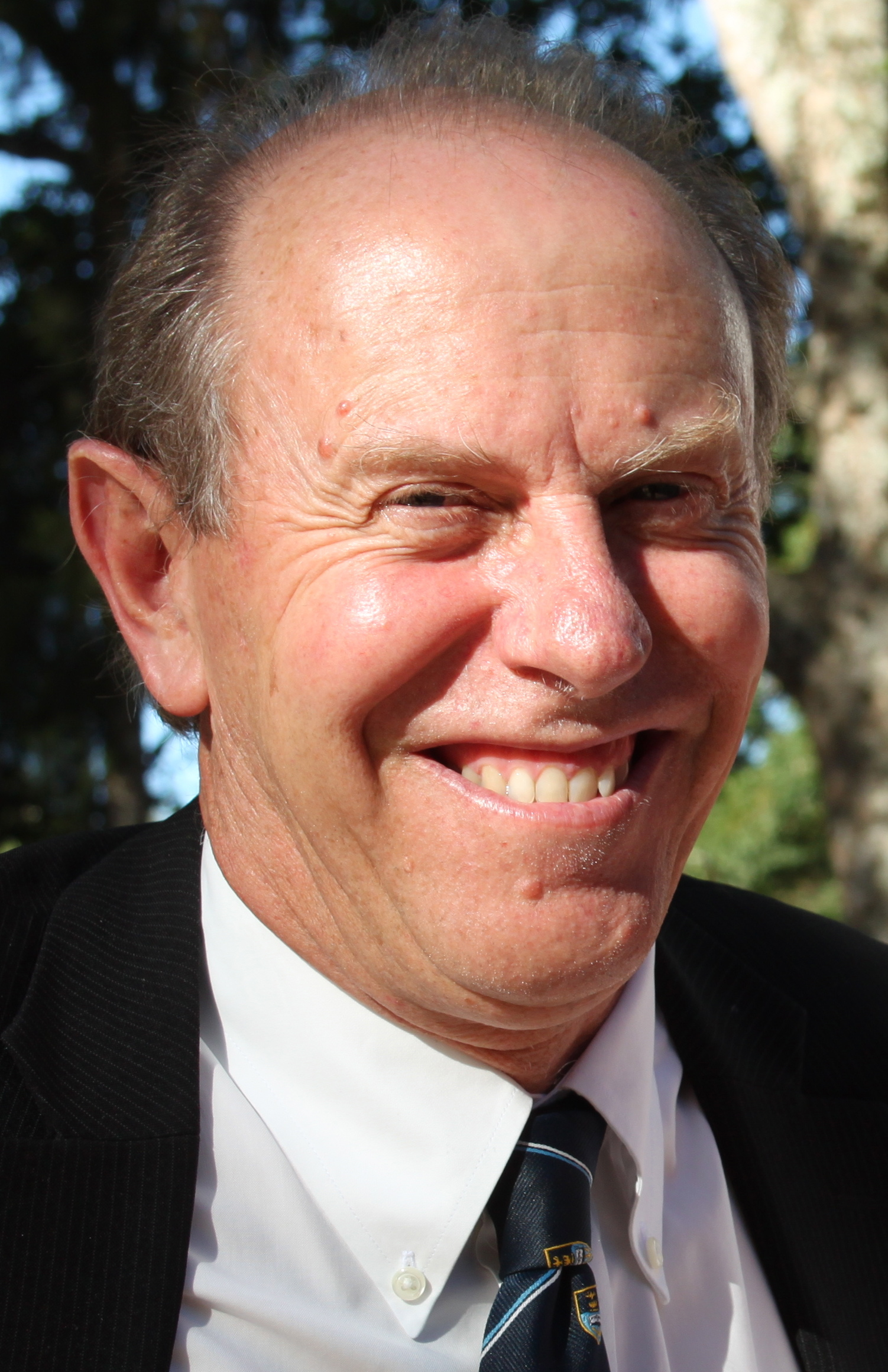
- Coltart in 2011

Mayor of Bulawayo
- Incumbent
- Assumed office 11 September 2023
- Preceded by: Solomon Mguni

Minister of Education, Sport and Culture
- In office 13 February 2009 – August 2013
- Prime Minister: Morgan Tsvangirai
- Preceded by: Aeneas Chigwedere

Senator for Khumalo
- In office 2008 – 22 August 2013

Member of the Zimbabwean Parliament for Bulawayo South
- In office 2000–2008
- Preceded by: Zenzo Nsimbi
- Succeeded by: Eddie Cross

Personal details
- Born: 4 October 1957 (age 68) Gwelo, Federation of Rhodesia and Nyasaland
- Party: Movement for Democratic Change – Ncube
- Spouse: Jennifer Reine Barrett (m. 1983)
- Children: 4
- Education: Christian Brothers College, Bulawayo; University of Cape Town
- Profession: Lawyer
- Website: www.davidcoltart.com

David Coltart (born 4 October 1957) is a Zimbabwean lawyer, Christian leader and politician. He was a founding member of the Movement for Democratic Change when it was established in 1999 and its founding secretary for legal affairs. Coltart was the Member of Parliament for Bulawayo South in the House of Assembly from 2000 to 2008, and he was elected to the Senate in 2008. He was the Minister for Education, Sport, Arts and Culture from February 2009 until August 2013.

Coltart is a top official of the Citizens Coalition for Change political party which was formed in 2022. He has served as the Mayor of Bulawayo since September 2023.

== Early life ==
Coltart was born in Gwelo, Midlands Province, in the former Federation of Rhodesia and Nyasaland. He was born an only child to a Scottish bank manager father and a South African nurse mother. His mother was the descendant of British settlers who settled in the Eastern Cape of South Africa in 1820. His Scottish grandfather was Deputy Lord Provost of Edinburgh in 1938. When Coltart was a young child the family relocated to Bulawayo. He was educated at Hillside Primary School followed by Christian Brothers College, a Catholic private school run by the Irish Christian Brothers, in Bulawayo. After matriculation, rather than do conscripted military service (as was required of all white male Rhodesians at the time) he successfully applied and was accepted to join the BSAP and served from October 1977 to Jan 1978. He left the BSAP by purchasing the remaining balance of his initial 3-year contract. He did general duties in Mashonaland, Matabeleland South, and Victoria provinces (Victoria became Masvingo province in 1980).

After this, Coltart enrolled at the University of Cape Town in 1978. At UCT he earned his Bachelor of Arts in Law as well as his LLB (post-graduate law degree). While at UCT Coltart first became involved in politics when he was elected as chairman of the Zimbabwe Students' Society. In 1981 he was threatened with deportation by the then-apartheid government who did not like his activities promoting the newly independent Zimbabwe. Shortly after this, Coltart received a telegram from then Prime Minister Robert Mugabe stating the new Zimbabwe government's commitment to building a multiracial society and encouraging Coltart to return home after his studies. Whilst at university, Coltart was also elected to serve on the Law Students' Council and was director of the Crossroads Legal Aid clinic, which provided services to indigent black South Africans.

In June 1981 Coltart became a professing Christian, an event which had a profound impact on his life and which has informed his thinking greatly ever since. Since 1983 Coltart has regularly spoken on Christian issues and periodically preaches in Zimbabwean churches and abroad.

Coltart married Jennifer Reine Barrett in 1983. They have four children.

== Work as a lawyer ==
After completing his law degree in December 1982, Coltart returned to Zimbabwe and in January 1983 went to work for the Webb, Low and Barry law firm in Bulawayo. He was admitted as a Legal Practitioner of the Zimbabwean High Court in February 1983. In April of that year he established the first Legal Aid Clinic in Bulawayo. He was appointed a partner of Webb, Low and Barry in 1984 and became the firm's senior partner in 1998, a position he still holds.

As a partner of Webb, Low and Barry, Coltart handled many human rights cases relating to the Gukurahundi genocide in Matabeleland between 1983 and 1987. In 1986, Coltart authored a detailed report concerning human rights abuses in Matabeleland during 1985, which was submitted to the Minister of Justice and the governor of Matabeleland North. During this time, Coltart represented various opposition PF ZAPU Central Committee members detained by the ZANU PF government, including Sidney Malunga, Edward Ndlovu and Stephen Nkomo (brother of ZAPU leader Joshua Nkomo).

In 1987 Coltart founded the Bulawayo Legal Projects Centre, a legal aid clinic, and was its director until 1997. Prior to this he established a Legal Advice Centre in Bulawayo, with the help of the Bulawayo Association of Legal Practitioners.

In 1990 Coltart helped establish and became a board member of the Central and Southern African Legal Assistance Foundation.

Coltart played an instrumental role in the first detailed investigation into the genocide committed by the Mugabe regime in Matabeleland between 1982 and 1987. He initiated the project as director of the Bulawayo Legal Projects Centre, one of the operational arms of the Legal Resources Centre in 1990. This culminated in the publication in 1997 of the report entitled Breaking the Silence: Building True Peace by the Catholic Commission for Justice and Peace in Zimbabwe and the Legal Resources Foundation. The publication of the report led to Coltart being publicly criticised on national television by Robert Mugabe in February 1999, who stated that:

"The likes of Clive Wilson and Clive Murphy, complemented by the Aurets and Coltarts of our society, are bent on ruining the national unity and loyalty of our people and their institutions. But we will ensure that they do not ever succeed in their evil machinations.... Let them be warned therefore that unless their insidious acts of sabotage immediately cease, my Government will be compelled to take very stern measures against them and those who have elected to be their puppets."

== Political career ==
=== Entry into politics ===
In 1983, whilst working as a lawyer, Coltart became involved in campaigning against the Rhodesian Front, serving as campaign manager for Bob Nixon, the first independent to unseat the RF in 17 years. In 1985 he served as campaign manager for all the independent candidates contesting seats in Matabeleland. The independent candidates stood against Ian Smith's then Conservative Alliance of Zimbabwe.

In 1991 Coltart spoke out against proposed economic liberalisation, arguing that it would not work without political liberalisation.

In 1992 Coltart was appointed legal adviser to the opposition Forum Party, established that year and led by Dr. Enoch Dumbutshena, Zimbabwe's first black Chief Justice. In June 1992 he drafted the Forum Party's manifesto entitled A Blueprint for Zimbabwe.

In 1994 Coltart wrote an open letter to Mugabe and the church in Zimbabwe condemning corruption, human rights abuses and the failure of justice and the rule of law in Zimbabwe.

In 1998 and 1999 Coltart sat on the Constitutional Drafting Committee of the National Constitutional Assembly and played a role in advocating successfully for the rejection of the government's draft constitution in the February 2000 referendum.

In 1999 Coltart was asked to join the Movement for Democratic Change (MDC) by trade union leader Morgan Tsvangirai who appointed him interim Legal Secretary for the party. In January 2000, at the inaugural congress of the MDC, Coltart was elected secretary for legal affairs. This position gave him the responsibility of formulating the MDC justice policy, of conducting the MDC's electoral court challenges and of organising the legal defence of MDC members who had been detained and prosecuted, including Morgan Tsvangirai's treason trial.

Coltart was one of the founders and directors of Capital Radio, an independent radio station that started broadcasting on 28 September 2000 from a hotel in Harare, following a Supreme Court ruling that nullified the Zimbabwe Broadcasting Corporation's monopoly. On the evening of 4 October, Coltart's house was raided by eleven armed police looking for equipment that was allegedly in contravention of the Radio Communications Act. The police failed to produce a valid search warrant, but nevertheless conducted the search and found nothing. The houses of other directors were also searched and equipment was seized from the Radio's broadcasting premises.

=== Member of Parliament ===
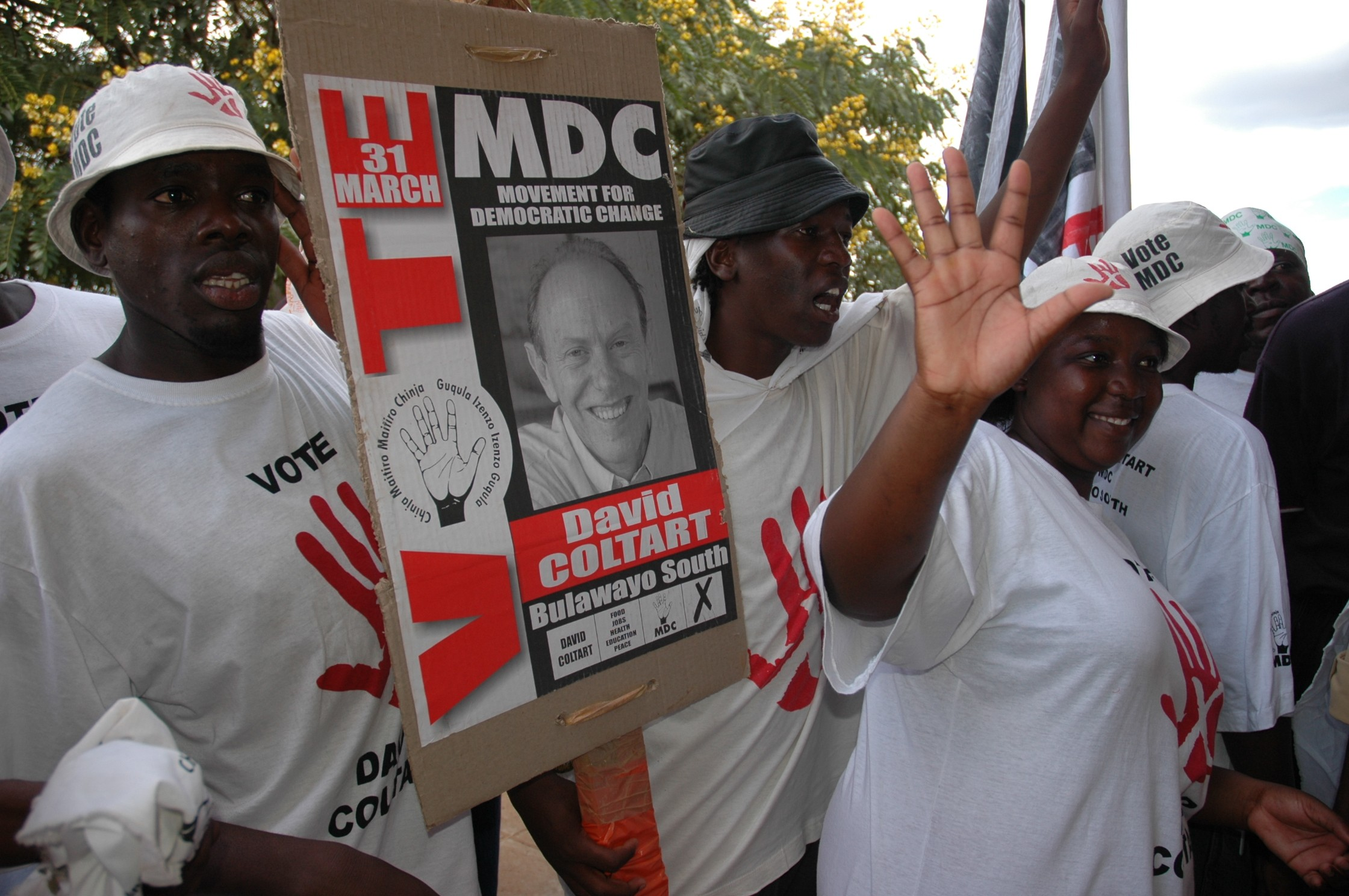
Election campaign March 2005

Coltart was elected to the House of Assembly in the 2000 election as a member of the Movement for Democratic Change, unseating the ZANU-PF incumbent and becoming the MP for Bulawayo South. During his first term in Parliament he was the Shadow Justice Minister and chaired the Parliamentary Justice Committee. He was re-elected in the March 2005 general election, winning his seat with a 76% majority against a ZANU-PF cabinet minister.

During the June 2000 election one of Coltart's polling agents, Patrick Nabanyama, was abducted in front of his family and has not been seen since. Six war veterans were arrested but later pardoned. One of those arrested, Cain Nkala, was subsequently murdered in November 2001. ZANU PF accused Coltart of involvement and imprisoned his former campaign manager for five weeks before dropping charges. Nkala's death has since been blamed on his own party, ZANU PF, following suggestions that he was about to publicise what happened to Nabanyama, although this has not been proved either.

During this time, Coltart's family were reported to have evacuated to South Africa but this was refuted when his wife, Jennifer, went to the offices of The Chronicle with their two-month-old daughter to prove they had remained in the country.

Coltart was again linked to Nkala's death in ZANU PF's 2002 presidential election campaign, which also emphasised his former role in the BSAP and falsely accused him of being a former member of the Rhodesian Selous Scouts. Mugabe accused him of being an instrument of the British and announced in September 2002 that such people, "like Bennett and Coltart, are not part of our society. They belong to Britain and let them go there... If they want to live here, we will say 'stay', but your place is in prison and nowhere else."

Coltart was the subject of much harassment in the early 2000s. He received numerous death threats, and was arrested and briefly detained in February 2002 for allegedly discharging a firearm in a public place. Charges were eventually withdrawn in June 2003. In March 2003, Coltart, with his two youngest children (then aged 9 and 6 months), drove out of the family home and were followed at speed by three armed men around their neighbourhood until the pursuers were intercepted by Coltart's security team and Coltart and his children were secured in a safe house.

As MP for Bulawayo South, Coltart established the Bulawayo South Development Trust to assist poorer communities in his constituency. The trust's remit was extended to cover the Khumalo constituency when Coltart was elected senator for Khumalo in March 2008. The trust has developed self-sustaining farming projects, given assistance to individuals suffering from HIV/AIDS and funded other individuals facing various difficult circumstances.

In 2003, Coltart met with the Zimbabwean cricketers Andy Flower and Henry Olonga to discuss their plans for making a protest against the Mugabe regime at the forthcoming World Cup, and came up with the idea of the two cricketers wearing black armbands during the match, signifying the death of democracy in Zimbabwe. He also helped them draft their protest statement.

=== MDC split ===
When the Movement for Democratic Change split in October 2005 Coltart was the only member of the National Executive of the party not to take sides in an effort to reconcile the two factions which emerged after the split. He eventually joined the smaller Welshman Ncube faction (MDC-N), stating the Tsvangirai faction's (MDC-T) unwillingness to confront violence within the party as the prevailing factor in his decision.

=== Minister for Education, Sport, Arts and Culture ===
In the March 2008 Senate election, Coltart won the seat of Khumalo, standing for the Mutambara faction of the MDC; he received 8,021 votes against 6,077 for Joubert Mangena of the Tsvangirai faction. When the ZANU-PF–MDC Government of National Unity was sworn in on 13 February 2009, Coltart became Minister of Education, Sport, Arts and Culture. In May he was appointed in addition to the position of co-chair of the Parliamentary Select Committee on Constitutional Reform.

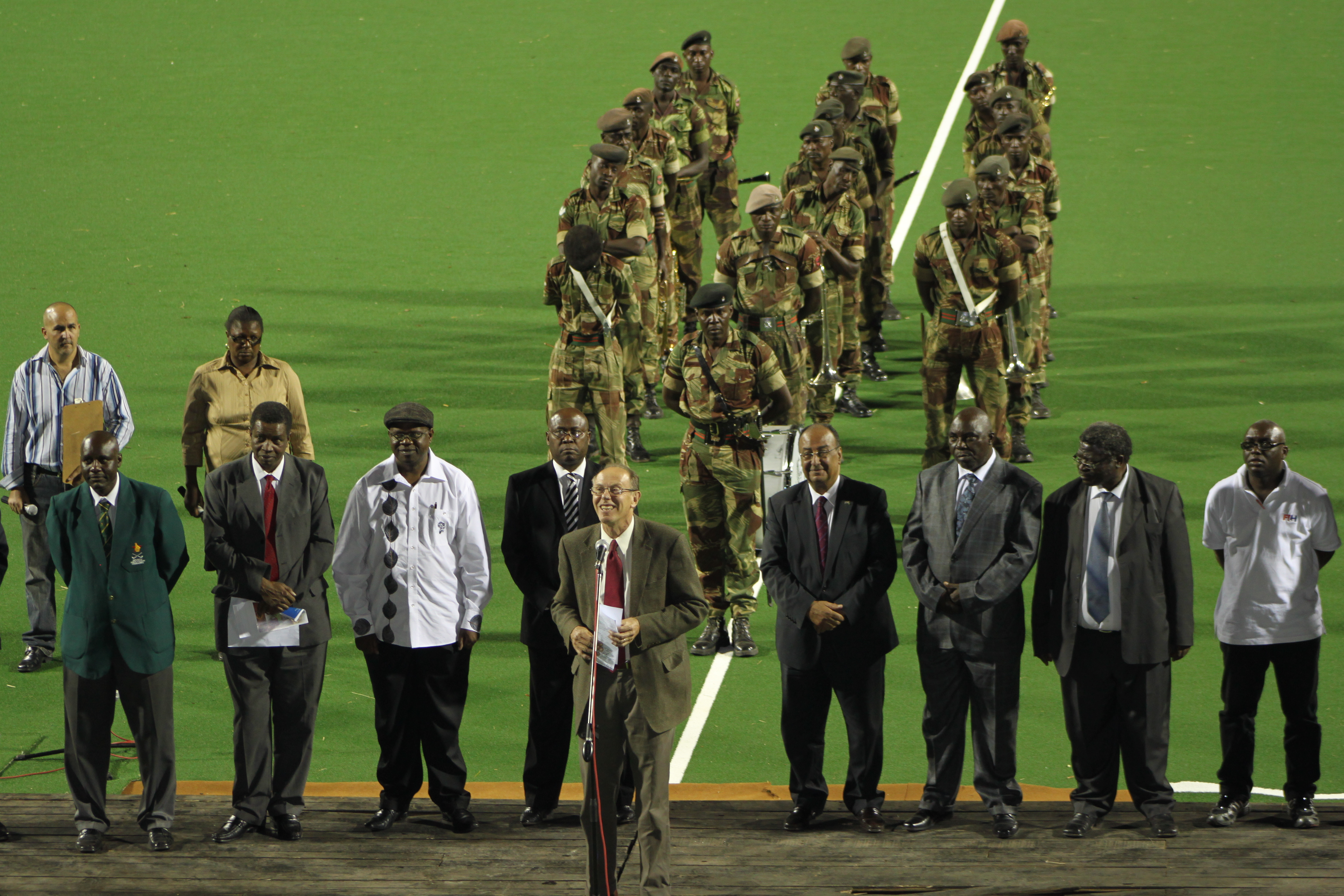
Opening ceremony of the African Olympic Hockey Qualifiers 2011

As Minister for Education, Coltart brought an end to the ongoing teacher strikes, enabling schools to re-open in 2009. He has raised teacher salaries, although they remain significantly lower than the figure demanded by the unions. He did not abolish the controversial 'teacher incentives' that school pupils are expected to pay in many schools to supplement teachers' incomes. In 2010 Coltart secured funding via UNICEF to provide all school children with textbooks in certain core subjects. He has also set in motion a curriculum review, the first since the 1980s, and planned to establish Academies of Excellence in each province, with full scholarships available for talented disadvantaged children.

In his role as Sports Minister, Coltart was instrumental in Zimbabwe's re-entry into test cricket in August 2011, with their first test in six years. Coltart was also influential in the refurbishment of Bulawayo's Khumalo Hockey Stadium, enabling it to host the African Olympic Hockey Qualifiers in September 2011 in preparation for the 2012 Olympics.

Coltart's term of office as Minister of Education, Sport, Arts and Culture ended on 22 August 2013 after he lost the Bulawayo East parliamentary seat by 19 votes.

== Other views ==
Coltart is against the death penalty, which is legal in Zimbabwe, and is anti-abortion. Since the formation of the inclusive government in February 2009, Coltart repeatedly argued against the use of sanctions in Zimbabwe, claiming that they are ineffective and that the international community should support the transitional government as Zimbabwe's only viable non-violent route towards a more democratic society. Coltart is opposed to the use of violence as a solution to the problems facing Zimbabwe, believing that political transition must occur gradually through democratic means. He has also criticised the West for high levels of military spending in relation to the development assistance they give. Coltart is a proponent of nuclear disarmament and is a World Council member of Parliamentarians for Nuclear Non-Proliferation and Disarmament (PNND). Although himself a committed Christian, Coltart believes that there should be a clear separation between church and state and that the church as a body should not support a particular political party. Coltart is a member of the Mont Pelerin Society.

== Works ==
- Coltart, David (2016). The Struggle Continues: 50 Years of Tyranny in Zimbabwe. Auckland Park, South Africa: Jacana Media. ISBN 9781431423194. OCLC 945375845.

== Electoral history ==
General Election 2008: Khumalo
Party	Candidate	Votes	%	±%
MDC-M	David Coltart	8,021	49.8	
MDC–T	Joubert Mangena	6,077	37.7	
ZANU–PF	Charles Mpofu	2,002	12.5	
Majority				
Turnout		16,100		
MDC-M hold		Swing		

General Election 2005: Bulawayo South
Party	Candidate	Votes	%	±%
MDC	David Coltart	12,120	75.8	−8.9
ZANU–PF	Sithembiso Nyoni	3,777	23.6	+10.6
Independent	Charles Mpofu	84	0.5	N/A
Majority		8,343	52.2	−19.5
Turnout		15,981	36.4	+0.6
MDC hold		Swing		

General Election 2000: Bulawayo South
Party	Candidate	Votes	%	±%
MDC	David Coltart	20,781	84.7	N/A
ZANU–PF	Callistus Ndlovu	3,193	13.0	−51.6
Independent	Others	552	2.2	N/A
Majority		17,588	71.7	
Turnout		24,526	35.8	
MDC gain from ZANU–PF		Swing		

== See also ==
- Zimbabwe
- Zimbabwe House of Assembly
- Bulawayo
- Bulawayo South
- White Zimbabweans
