= Archdiocese of Bulawayo =

Latin Catholic archdiocese in Zimbabwe

Coordinates: 20.1548°S 28.5779°E

Archdiocese of Bulawayo Archidioecesis Bulauaiensis
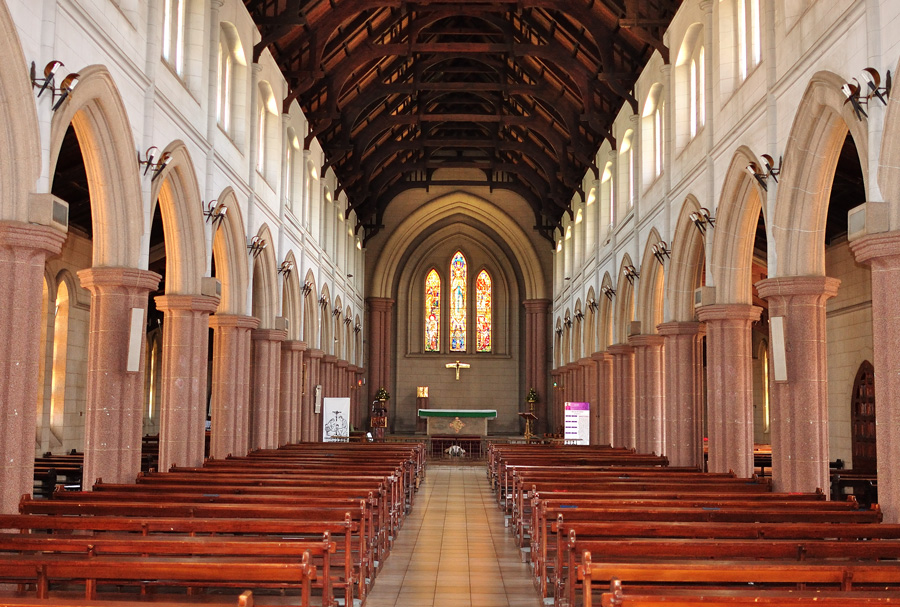
- The nave of St. Mary's Cathedral Basilica, Bulawayo

Location
- Country: Zimbabwe
- Territory: Bulilima, Mangwe, Nyamandhlovu, Tsholotsho, Bubi, part of Lupane and Nkayi with Shangani River as boundary, Insiza, Umzingwane, Beitbridge and Gwanda west of Umzingwane River, Matobo
- Ecclesiastical province: Bulawayo
- Metropolitan: Bulawayo

Statistics
- Area: 66,956 km^{2} (25,852 sq mi)
- Population: Total; Catholics: (as of 2016); 2,161,000; 61,099 (2.8%)
- Parishes: 38
- Schools: 22

Information
- Denomination: Catholic Church
- Sui iuris church: Latin Church
- Rite: Roman Rite
- Established: January 4, 1931
- Cathedral: St. Mary's the Cathedral Basilica of Immaculate Conception, Bulawayo
- Patron saint: Immaculate Heart of Mary
- Secular priests: 41

Current leadership
- Pope: Leo XIV
- Archbishop: Alex Kaliyanil, SVD
- Vicar General: Fr Agreement Ngwenya
- Bishops emeritus: Pius Ncube

Map
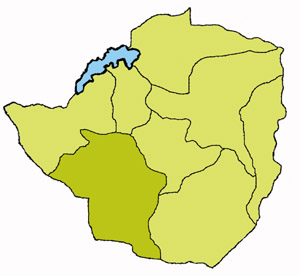

Website
- bulawayoarchdiocese.org

The Archdiocese of Bulawayo (Latin: Bulauaien(sis)) is the Metropolitan See for the ecclesiastical province of Bulawayo in Zimbabwe.

== History ==
- January 4, 1931: Established as Mission “sui iuris” of Bulawayo from the Apostolic Prefecture of Salisbury
- July 18, 1932: Promoted as Apostolic Prefecture of Bulawayo
- April 13, 1937: Promoted as Apostolic Vicariate of Bulawayo
- January 1, 1955: Promoted as Diocese of Bulawayo
- June 10, 1994: Promoted as Metropolitan Archdiocese of Bulawayo

== Cathedral ==
The seat of the archbishop is the Cathedral of the Immaculate Conception in Bulawayo.

== Leadership ==
=== Prefect of Bulawayo ===
- Giovanni Matteo Konings, OSCr (1926 – 1929)

=== Ecclesiastical Superior of Bulawayo ===
- Ignatius Arnoz, CMM (27 April 1931 – 18 June 1932 see below)

=== Prefect Apostolic of Bulawayo ===
- Ignatius Arnoz, CMM (see above 18 June 1932 – 13 April 1937 see below)

=== Vicars Apostolic of Bulawayo ===
- Ignazio Arnoz, CMM (see above 13 April 1937 – 26 February 1950)
- Adolph Gregory Schmitt, CMM (23 December 1950 – 1 January 1955 see below)

=== Bishops of Bulawayo ===
- Adolph Gregory Schmitt, CMM (see above 1 January 1955 – 9 May 1974)
- Ernst Heinrich Karlen, CMM (9 May 1974 – 10 June 1994 see below)

=== Archbishops of Bulawayo ===
- Ernst Heinrich Karlen, CMM (see above 10 June 1994 – 24 October 1997)
- Pius Ncube (24 October 1997 – 11 September 2007)
- Apostolic administrator: Martin Schupp, CMM (11 September 2007 – 20 June 2009)
- Alex Kaliyanil, SVD (20 June 2009 – )

== Suffragan dioceses ==
- Diocese of Gweru
- Diocese of Hwange
- Diocese of Masvingo

== See also ==
- Catholic Church in Zimbabwe
- List of Catholic dioceses in Zimbabwe

== Sources ==
- GCatholic.org
