= Apostolic Faith Mission in Zimbabwe =

Classical Pentecostal Christian denomination in Zimbabwe

- Classification: Protestant
- Orientation: Pentecostal
- Theology: Evangelical
- Polity: Mixed presbyterian and episcopal
- Associations: Apostolic Faith Mission International, Pentecostal World Conference, Zimbabwe Council of Churches
- Region: Zimbabwe
- Founder: John G. Lake and Thomas Hezmalhalch
- Origin: 1908
- Separations: 1919 Black Zionists, 1928, 1958 Pentecostal Protestant Church
- Members: 1.2 million

The Apostolic Faith Mission in Zimbabwe is a classical Pentecostal Christian denomination in Zimbabwe. It is one of the oldest Pentecostal movement is Zimbabwe with roots in the Azusa Street Revival, the Holiness Movement teachings of Andrew Murray and John Alexander Dowie.

== History ==
The Apostolic Faith Mission in Zimbabwe was a product of the evangelism efforts of migrant workers who had left Southern Rhodesia to work in South Africa and had encountered the teachings of John Graham Lake and the Apostolic Faith Mission of South Africa, most notably Zacharias Manamela who preached in the Gobadema area of Gwanda. In 1915, the Apostolic Faith Mission of South Africa deployed WF Dugmore to facilitate the formal registration of the newly developed daughter church with the Southern Rhodesian authorities. Due to the friction he had with the Methodist Church over his recruitment of John Wesley Dingiswayo, a black preacher whom had been expelled by the church, he could not successfully register the church. Between 1915 and 1930s, immigrants from South Africa continued to evangelise, resulting in the expansion of the church despite being not registered.
