= Raj Modi =

Zimbabwean businessman and politician

The Hon. Raj Modi MP

Member of Parliament for Bulawayo South
- Incumbent
- Assumed office 9 December 2023
- President: Emmerson Mnangagwa
- Preceded by: Nicola Watson
- Constituency: Bulawayo South
- Majority: 478 (17.5%)
- In office 5 September 2018 – 22 August 2023
- President: Emmerson Mnangagwa
- Preceded by: Eddie Cross
- Succeeded by: Nicola Watson

Deputy Minister of Industry and Commerce
- Incumbent
- Assumed office 24 January 2024
- President: Emmerson Mnangagwa
- Minister: Sithembiso Nyoni; Mangaliso Ndlovu
- Preceded by: Roy Bhila
- In office 7 September 2018 – 22 September 2023
- President: Emmerson Mnangagwa
- Minister: Mangaliso Ndlovu; Sekai Nzenza
- Succeeded by: Roy Bhila

Personal details
- Born: Rajeshkumari Modi; 4 February 1959 (age 67) Rajpipla, Gujarat, India
- Party: ZANU–PF
- Education: South Gujarat University (BA)

Rajeshkumar Indukant Modi (born 4 February 1959) is a Zimbabwean businessman and politician who is the member of the National Assembly of Zimbabwe for Bulawayo South and Deputy Minister of Industry and Commerce. He previously served as the MP for the constituency and as deputy minister from 2018 until 2023. He is a member of ZANU–PF.

Originally from Gujarat, India, he graduated from South Gujarat University and briefly worked for an electricity board. Modi found work at a department store in Zimbabwe and eventually opened a tuck shop. In 1999, he opened his first supermarket, eventually owning as many as twelve before selling them in 2013. He currently runs a liquor wholesale business, several manufacturing facilities, and other businesses.

Modi joined ZANU–PF in the early 2000s, and went on to hold leadership roles at the district, ward, and provincial level. He was seen as an ally of Emmerson Mnangagwa amid the factional infighting within the party leading up to the 2017 Zimbabwean coup d'état. His election to parliament in 2018 made him the only successful ZANU–PF candidate in Bulawayo, traditionally an opposition Movement for Democratic Change stronghold. After the election, he was named to President Mnangagwa's cabinet as deputy industry and commerce minister. His appointment made him the first person of Indian origin MP in Zimbabwe and the only person of Indian origin government minister in Africa outside South Africa. Modi was defeated as a Member of Parliament by Nicola Watson of the Citizens Coalition for Change at the 2023 general election and was not reappointed to cabinet. After Watson was recalled from the National Assembly, he stood in the subsequent by-election in December 2023 and won back the seat.

== Early life and education ==
Rajeshkumar Indukant Modi was born on 4 February 1959 in Rajpipla, Gujarat, in western India. He came from a middle-class Gujarati family that sometimes struggled financially. He attended M. R. Vidyalay Primary School, followed by A. V. Patel High School in Ahmedabad. During his school years, he played basketball and field hockey. He went on to study at South Gujarat University, graduating with a Bachelor of Arts in economics in 1981. In 1979, while still a university student, he started working as a cashier for the Gujarat Electricity Board, a job he held for two years.

== Business career ==
In March 1981, shortly after graduating, Modi married Parul Kothari, who was born in India and moved to Southern Rhodesia as a teenager in 1975. They went to Zimbabwe in September of the same year to visit his wife's adopted country. It was supposed to be a short visit—he arrived with only $50, two pairs of clothes, and a return ticket—but when his father-in-law died unexpectedly, the couple ended up staying to support Parul's mother. The loan for his plane tickets, which cost $300 and were funded by an Indian religious organization in Bulawayo, needed to be refunded, so he found work and made payments of $20 each month. His first job in Zimbabwe was at a department store in Bulawayo, where he was tasked with sweeping, mopping, cleaning windows and toilets, and delivering goods to customers' homes. Modi described his first six months in Zimbabwe as difficult. There were many cultural differences, and all his friends and family—except his wife and mother-in-law—were in India. However, he soon adjusted and became comfortable living in Zimbabwe, and eventually acquired citizenship in 1987.

After eight months at the department store, Modi began working at a supermarket, where he would remain for eight years. He would walk to and from work to save up money. After six years, he pooled funds with his wife and mother-in-law and opened his own shop, Bellevue Superette. Modi continued working at the supermarket to support the household, while his wife ran the shop and worked a second job to meet the costs of growing the business. Two years later, he quit his job at the supermarket to run the shop so Parul could stay home and care for her mother, who had cancer. The Superette, which began as a tuck shop with a staff of two, grew under his direction, and in 1999, he established his first supermarket, the Bellevue Spar. He eventually opened twelve supermarkets in total, before selling his company, Sai Enterprises, to Choppies, a Botswana-based multinational grocery retailer, in 2013. He has since opened a number of new supermarkets in Zimbabwe, and owns three others in Australia.

After selling his supermarkets, Modi opened a liquor wholesale business, Liquor Hub, which he continues to run. His company Pintail Trading, manufactures its own alcoholic beverages, including whisky, and is also a PepsiCo product distributor. His recent projects in 2018 included manufacturing facilities that produce alcoholic beverages, bottled water, and exercise books. In 2020, his business ventures in development included a solar energy equipment factory, a smartphone and laptop assembly plant, and a shopping complex in Bulawayo's Cowdray Park suburb, which together would employ around 1,000 people.

In addition to his businesses, Modi runs the Modi Family Trust, which provides capital to small startup businesses. In 2018, he donated $40,000 to renovate the squalid Sidojiwe hostel complex in Bulawayo. He has served as chief executive officer of the Bulawayo and Matabeleland sports and recreation commissions, as a member of the Bulawayo Publicity Association finance committee, and as general manager for Bulawayo of the Zimbabwe Youth Games. He funds most of the Bulawayo teams that participate in the youth games and the Paralympic Games. Modi has won dozens of awards for his business and philanthropic activities.

== Political career ==
Modi was the only successful ZANU–PF parliamentary candidate in Bulawayo (bottom left, in green) in the 2018 Zimbabwean general election.

Modi joined the ruling Zimbabwe African National Union – Patriotic Front (ZANU–PF) party in 2002 or 2003. In 2014, he was elected secretary for indigenisation for the party's Bulawayo city district executive. He was elected ward secretary for production and labour in 2018, and later rose to become ZANU–PF provincial secretary of finance for Bulawayo. Amid the factionalism within ZANU–PF that led to the 2017 Zimbabwean coup d'état, Modi was seen as an ally of Vice-President Emmerson Mnangagwa.

In May 2018, Modi won the primary to represent ZANU–PF in the 2018 parliamentary election in the Bulawayo South constituency, defeating six other candidates. In the general election, held on 30 July 2018, Modi won with 40 percent of the vote in a field of sixteen candidates. He was the only successful ZANU–PF candidate in Bulawayo, whose other eleven constituencies were won by the opposition Movement for Democratic Change Alliance. He was the party's first winning candidate since 2000 in a Bulawayo parliamentary election not boycotted by the MDC. His victory was helped by the fact that two candidates, Muvirimi Francis Mangwendeza and Kunashe Muchemwa, ran on the MDC Alliance ticket, splitting the opposition vote. Mangwendeza and Muchemwa polled 4,155 and 2,249 votes, respectively, while Modi received 5,752. Modi attributed his victory to his local reputation for philanthropy.

After the election, the second place candidate, Mangwendeza, challenged the results, alleging that his name was absent from some of the ballots, and that the Zimbabwe Electoral Commission had published a statement incorrectly listing his name among candidates who had withdrawn from the race. Mangwendeza sought a court order nullifying the results and declaring the seat vacant, but a Bulawayo High Court judge upheld Modi's victory in a May 2019 ruling.

Modi was sworn in to Parliament on 5 September 2018, becoming the first Indian MP in Zimbabwe's history. On 7 September 2018, President Emmerson Mnangagwa appointed Modi deputy minister of industry and commerce in his new cabinet. Besides South Africa's Pravin Gordhan, this made him the only government minister of Indian origin in any African country. Modi announced that he would donate his government salary—for a deputy minister, around $3,000 a month—to Bulawayo charities. After being named deputy minister, Modi requested that he be allowed to work from Bulawayo instead of the capital, Harare. Mangaliso Ndlovu, under whom Modi initially served, was succeeded as industry and commerce minister by Sekai Nzenza in November 2019.

In October 2018, Modi was criticized for continuing to sell goods in US dollars rather than Zimbabwean bond notes at his businesses, which was against government policy. He defended this decision as being necessary for the business to remain open, adding, "I am not the only one who is charging in US dollars; everybody is doing that." He was also accused of illegally trading in foreign currency on the parallel market, a charge he strongly denied. In reference to Modi's position as deputy minister, the United Kingdom-based academic Alex Magaisa tweeted, "How do you enforce a government policy when you are breaching it?"

From December 2019 to January 2020, Modi visited India on a month-long trip to attract Gujarati investors to Zimbabwe. In particular, he pitched opportunities in the sectors of mining, energy, agriculture, pharmaceuticals, and tourism, among others. He returned with proposals from several potential investors, and a business delegation planning to visit the following month. While there, he also met with Vijay Rupani, the Chief Minister of Gujarat, and invited him to visit Zimbabwe with a business delegation. Rupani expressed interest in projects related to energy production, and arranged for a group from the Indian Ministry of Education to visit Zimbabwe in February 2020.

Modi was unseated as the MP for Bulawayo South by Nicola Watson of the Citizens Coalition for Change in the 2023 general election. He was not reappointed to Mnangagwa's cabinet. He was not reappointed to cabinet by Mnangagwa. Watson was recalled as the MP for Bulawayo South in October 2023 by Sengezo Tshabangu, who claimed that he was the interim secretary-general of the Citizens Coalition for Change. A by-election was subsequently held on 9 December 2023, which Modi won as the ZANU–PF candidate.

== Personal life ==
Modi lives in a townhouse in the Hume Park suburb of Bulawayo. With his wife Parul, he has three children and three grandchildren. His father died in 1985 and his mother in 1988, but he still has brothers and sisters in India. He visits them regularly and they also visit him in Zimbabwe. He speaks English, Gujarati, Hindi, and a basic level of Ndebele.

Modi prefers wearing casual clothing over suits, and eats in his company's cafeteria. He typically works seven days a week, waking at 7 in the morning and going to sleep at ten at night. When he is not working, he spends time with his wife, children, and grandchildren, and occasionally plays golf and cricket. He is a fan of the Highlanders, a Bulawayo football club. He likes Indian food and enjoys whisky, especially Jameson.

== See also ==
- Indians in Zimbabwe
- List of members of the 9th Parliament of Zimbabwe
