= Giovanni Matteo Konings =

The Reverend Giovanni Matteo Konings OSCr
- Prefect of Bulawayo
- Province: Bulawayo
- Diocese: Bulawayo
- Appointed: 1926
- Installed: 1926
- Term ended: 1929
- Predecessor: None (new post)
- Successor: Ignatius Arnoz, CMM

Personal details
- Born: Giovanni Matteo Konings
- Died: 1929 Bulawayo, Zimbabwe
- Denomination: Roman Catholic

Giovanni Matteo Konings, OSCr (died 1929) was a Prelate of the Roman Catholic Church.

Konings was a member of the Canons Regular of the Order of the Holy Cross. In 1926 he was appointed Prefect of the then Mission "Sui Iuris" of Bulawayo. He died in 1929.

== See also ==
- Archdiocese of Bulawayo

Catholic Church titles
Preceded by N/A; New Post	Prefect of Bulawayo; 1926 - 1929	Succeeded by Ignatius Arnoz
