= Alex Kaliyanil =

The Most Reverend Alex Kaliyanil S.V.D.
- Archbishop of Bulawayo
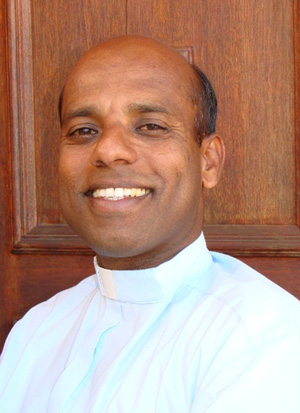
- Archdiocese: Archdiocese of Bulawayo
- Appointed: 20 June 2009
- Installed: 12 September 2009
- Predecessor: Pius Ncube

Orders
- Ordination: 7 May 1988
- Consecration: 12 September 2009 by George Kocherry

Personal details
- Born: Alexander Thomas Kaliyanil; 27 May 1960 Vallamchira, Manimala, Kerala, India
- Denomination: Roman Catholic

Styles of Alex Kaliyanil
- Reference style: The Most Reverend
- Spoken style: Your Grace
- Religious style: Archbishop

Alexander Thomas Kaliyanil S.V.D. (born 27 May 1960) is an Indian Roman Catholic missionary and the current Archbishop of Bulawayo in Zimbabwe.

== Biography ==
Born in Vallachira, Kerala, Kaliyanil joined the Divine Word Missionaries in 1987 and was ordained a priest on 7 May 1988, being sent to Zimbabwe the year after. He holds a Diploma in Economics from Mysore University, India. Since 1989 he has been a missionary in Zimbabwe, in the Archdiocese of Bulawayo, where he held the following positions: 1990–1992: vicar of Holy Cross Parish in Tshabalala, 1992–1997: parish mission Embakwe, 1997–2005: parish priest of St. Joseph Tsholotsho and dean of the Southern and Northern Deanery, 2005–2008: diocesan bursar; since 2001: ex officio director of the Catholic Development Commission (Caritas Zimbabwe) from 2008: regional superior of the Society of the Divine Word in Zimbabwe. He became archdiocesan treasurer in 2005, and the local superior of the Divine Word Missionaries in 2008.

On 20 June 2009, Kaliyanil was appointed the third archbishop of Bulawayo by Pope Benedict XVI.

He succeeds the politically outspoken Pius Ncube, who resigned as archbishop in September 2007 amid accusations of adultery.

Catholic Church titles
| Preceded by Pius Ncube | Archbishop of Bulawayo; 20 June 2009 – present | Succeeded by incumbent |
