= Ignatius Arnoz =

The Most Reverend Ignatius Arnoz M.H.M
- Vicar Apostolic of Bulawayo
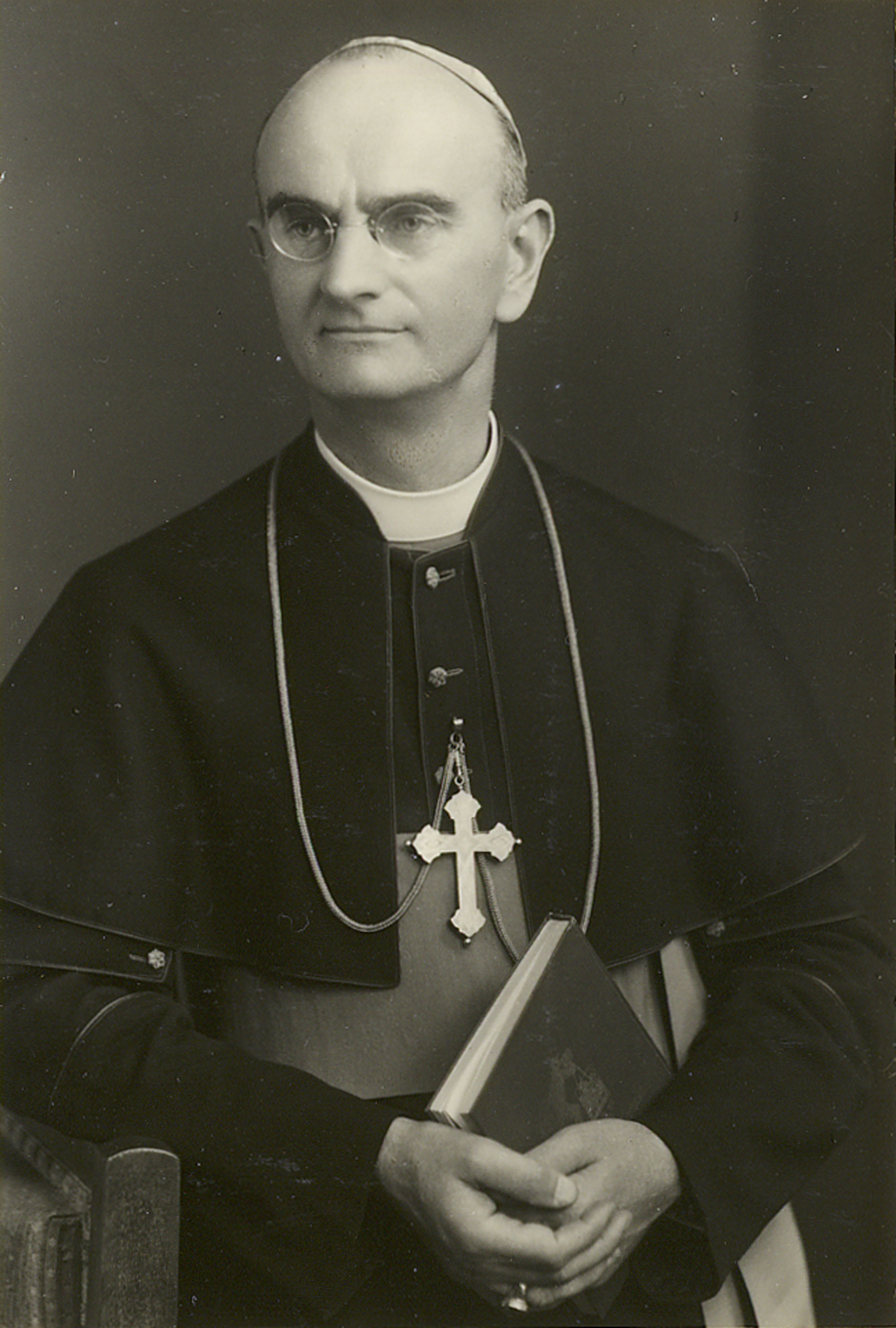
- Arnoz in 1937
- Province: Bulawayo
- Diocese: Bulawayo
- Appointed: 1931 (Superior); 11 November 1932 (Prefect); 13 April 1937 (Vicar Apostolic)
- Installed: 1931
- Term ended: 26 February 1950
- Predecessor: Giovanni Matteo Konings
- Successor: Adolph Gregory Schmitt
- Other post: Titular Bishop of Busiris

Orders
- Ordination: 25 July 1910
- Consecration: 30 May 1937 by Antonin Alois Weber

Personal details
- Born: Ignatius Arnoz; 1 April 1885 Bodenbach, Kingdom of Bohemia
- Died: 26 February 1950 (aged 64)
- Denomination: Roman Catholic

Styles of Ignatius Arnoz
- Reference style: The Most Reverend
- Spoken style: Your Excellency
- Religious style: Bishop

Ignatius Arnoz, M.H.M. (1 April 1885 – 26 February 1950) was a Czech prelate of the Roman Catholic Church.

Ignatius Arnoz was born in Bodenbach, Bohemia, and ordained a priest on 25 July 1910 from the religious order of the Mill Hill Missionaries. In 1931 he was appointed Senior of the then Mission "Sui Iuris" of Bulawayo. Arnoz rose to Prefect and Vicar Apostolic as the mission was elevated. He was ordained bishop in 1937.

== See also ==
- Archdiocese of Bulawayo

Catholic Church titles
Preceded by Celestino Annibale Cattaneo	Titular Bishop of Busiris; 1937 - 1950	Succeeded by Johannes Albert von Rudloff
Preceded by Giovanni Matteo Konings	Vicar Apostolic of Bulawayo; 1931 - 1950	Succeeded by Adolph Gregory Schmitt
