= Nelson Chamisa =

Zimbabwean politician (born 1978)

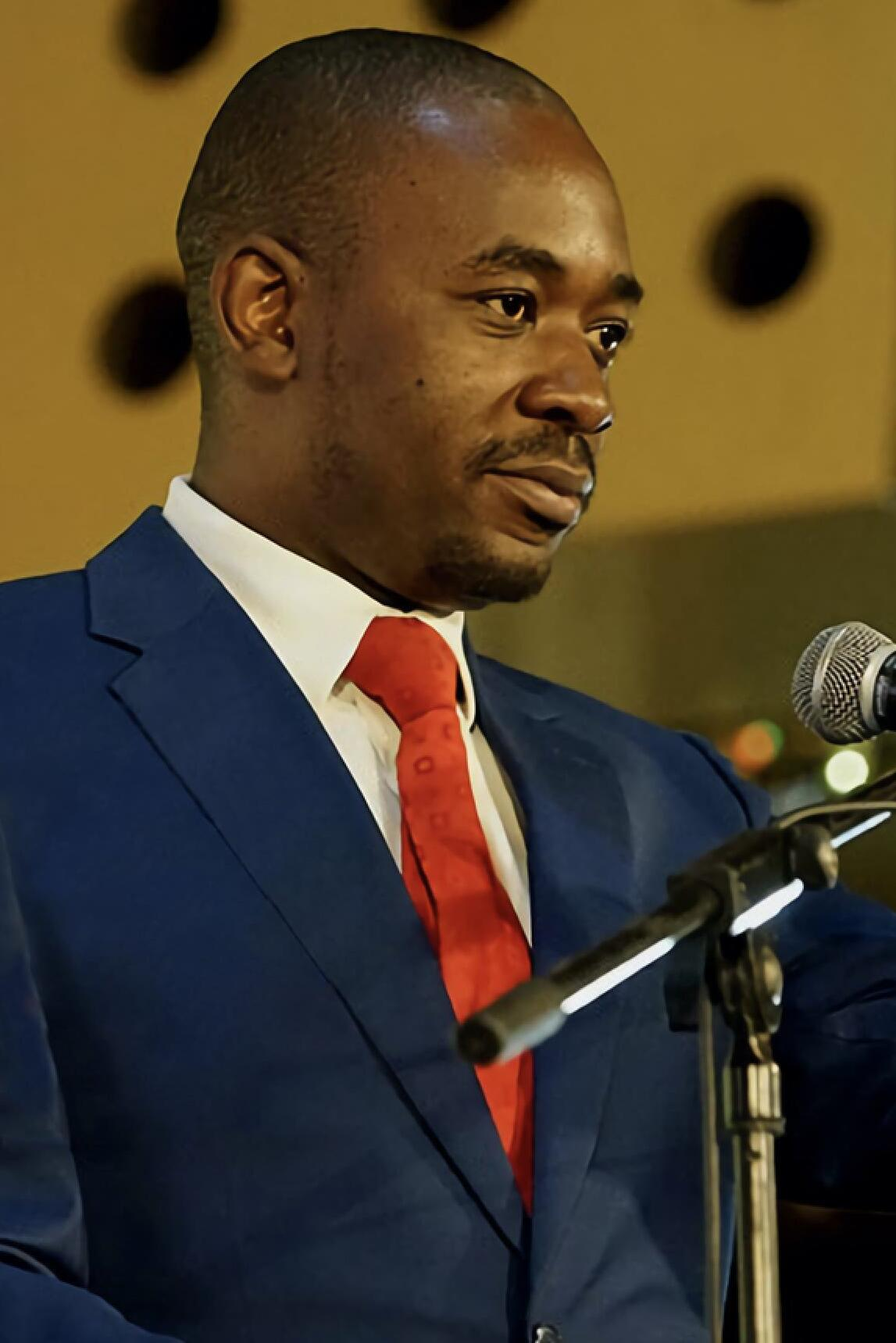

President of the Citizens Coalition For Change Founder of the Citizens Coalition For Change
- In office 22 January 2022 – 25 January 2024
- Vice Presidents: Welshman Ncube; Tendai Biti; Lynette Karenyi Kore
- Preceded by: Party founded

President of the Movement for Democratic Change Alliance
- In office May 2019 – September 2021; Acting: 14 February 2018 - May 2019
- Preceded by: Party split
- Succeeded by: Douglas Mwonzora

President of the Movement for Democratic Change - Tsvangirai
- In office 15 February 2018 – 22 April 2018 (disputed with Thokozani Khupe)
- Preceded by: Morgan Tsvangirai
- Succeeded by: Thokozani Khupe

Minister of Information Communication Technology of Zimbabwe
- In office 13 February 2009 – 31 July 2013
- President: Robert Mugabe
- Prime Minister: Morgan Richard Tsvangirai
- Preceded by: Position established
- Succeeded by: Supa Mandiwanzira

Personal details
- Born: 2 February 1978 (age 48) Fort Victoria, Rhodesia (now Masvingo, Zimbabwe)
- Party: Citizens Coalition for Change (2022–2024); Movement for Democratic Change Alliance (2019–2021); Movement for Democratic Change – Tsvangirai (2005–2018)
- Other political affiliations: Agenda 2026
- Education: Harare Polytechnic; University of Zimbabwe
- Occupation: Politician; lawyer; theologist; activist

Nelson Chamisa (born 2 February 1978) is a Zimbabwean politician and the former President of the Citizens Coalition For Change. He served as Member of the House of Assembly of Zimbabwe for Kuwadzana East, Harare. Chamisa was the MDC Alliance's candidate for president in the 2018 general election, having previously been the leader of the party's youth assembly. He was the Presidential candidate for the Citizens Coalition for Change in the 2023 Zimbabwean Presidential election. He has served as the former chairperson of national youth for the same party as well as the Secretary for Information and Publicity for the MDC Alliance. In 2003, at the age of 25, Chamisa became the youngest Member of Parliament. Chamisa was also the youngest cabinet minister in Government of National Unity of Zimbabwe in 2009.

== Biography ==
He was born in the small town of Masvingo in 1978. Nelson studied at Harare Polytechnic and the University of Zimbabwe.

Chamisa is the former chairperson of the MDC Youth Assembly. He was elected MDC Alliance's spokesman at the Party Congress in June 2006. In April 2011 at the Party's congress in Bulawayo, he was elected as the party's organising secretary, a post that previously belonged to Elias Mudzuri. In Parliament, he was chair of the portfolio committees of Defence and Home Affairs, Public Accounts, Gender and Youth, and Transport and Communications. Chamisa is also a member of the Local Government, Public Works & Urban Development, and the African Caribbean and Pacific Parliament. He is a former secretary-general of the Zimbabwe National Students Union.

In March 2007 he was attacked at Harare International Airport as he attempted to leave the country for Belgium; he was admitted to a hospital with a broken skull. In regards to the current situation in Zimbabwe, he said, "There is no security. There is no protection. All of us are at risk."

On 10 February 2009, Morgan Tsvangirai designated Chamisa for the position of Minister of Information, Communication, and Technology as part of the national unity government. After taking office, he fell into a dispute with Webster Shamu, the Minister of Information and Publicity, regarding which ministry should deal with telecommunications. The Herald reported on 10 April 2009, that President Robert Mugabe had assigned responsibility for telecommunications to the Ministry of Transport, headed by Nicholas Goche. Chamisa and Tsvangirai objected to this decision, saying that Mugabe had no power to unilaterally assign telecommunications to another ministry under the terms of the power-sharing agreement.

Chamisa served as a cabinet minister from February 2009 to July 2013, until the end of the Government of national Unity. He also served as the Movement for Democratic Change's organising secretary. He lost the position of party Secretary-General in the party's 2014 Congress to Douglas Mwonzora. Chamisa has been accused of barring other youth and student leaders from having closer access to party president Tsvangirai, a move allegedly meant to protect his position. After the expulsion of Tendai Biti and Elton Mangoma, Chamisa's relationship with Morgan Tsvangirai deteriorated; he was apparently not well-liked by Tsvangirai's loyalists. On 16 July 2016 Chamisa was appointed as co-Vice President of the MDC by Tsvangirai to serve alongside Mudzuri and Khupe.

When party leader Morgan Tsvangirai began battling colon cancer, power struggles began to ensue in the party, mainly between the three Vice Presidents Chamisa, Elias Mudzuri and Thokozani Khupe. On 14 February 2018, it was announced that Tsvangirai had succumbed to colon cancer in the hospital and the next day, the Party's national council appointed Chamisa acting president for a period of 12 months effectively elbowing Mudzuri and Khupe out. As the new President of the MDC he also took over the role of Leader of the MDC Alliance.

On 30 July 2018, Chamisa lost a disputed election to ZANU PF's Mnangagwa. The election has been widely criticized for lacking credibility and being unfair. Chamisa challenged the election results in Zimbabwe's constitutional court but his challenge was dismissed with cost. After the failure to convince the Constitutional Court, Chamisa questioned the independence of the judiciary and has since promised his supporters a strategy to regain stolen electoral victory.

Chamisa claims ZANU-PF lost elections. His claims are partially backed up by the EU observers and several other observer bodies that reported the elections were not free and fair.

In October 2021, their political party denounced a new attack against its leader, Nelson Chamisa, who came out unscathed after being shot the day before while in his car after a political rally.

He resigned on 27 January 2024 citing government interference that has "contaminated" and "hijacked" the CCC.

== Education ==
Chamisa holds a master's in International Relations and Diplomacy from the University of Zimbabwe, Governance and Development Studies degree from the Stanford University in California USA, bachelor's degree in political science and public administration, and an LLB (Honours) from the University of Zimbabwe. He is a qualified lawyer and has worked for Harare law firm Atherstone and Cook since November 2014. In 2016, he obtained a Diploma in Theology from Living Waters Theological Seminary of Harare, a seminary affiliated with the Apostolic Faith Mission in Zimbabwe.

== Political beliefs ==
Chamisa has been characterized as a Christian social conservative and an economic progressive.

=== Stance on Israel ===
During the run-up to the 2018 elections, Nelson Chamisa embarked on a tour of Israel. His spokesperson and office refused to share the reasons of the visit, saying "It was a private visit, which was undertaken by the president and we expect him in the country anytime from now". Upon his return, he declared that should he win, Zimbabwe would open an embassy in Israel, a decision which was criticised by the Supreme Council of Islamic Affairs of Zimbabwe.

=== Stance on homosexuality ===
Speaking on the legacy of Robert Mugabe in an interview with the Zimbabwe Broadcasting Corporation, Chamisa said Mugabe's views on homosexuality were positive, saying, "We must be able to respect what God ordained and how we are created as a people, there are a male and a female, there are Adam and Eve, not Adam and Steve".

In 2018, responding to a tweet inquiring about his position on LGBT issues in general, Chamisa replied "God created Adam and Eve not Adam and Steve. I thank God for the template!"

== See also ==
- 2007 Zimbabwean political crisis

Parliament of Zimbabwe
Preceded by Learnmore Jongwe	Member of the Zimbabwe Parliament from Kuwadzana East; 2003-2018	Succeeded by Charlton Hwende
Political offices
Preceded by Position established	Ministry of Information and Communications Technology; 2009-2013	Succeeded by Supa Mandiwanzira
Party political offices
Preceded by Morgan Tsvangirai	President of Movement for Democratic Change; 2018-present	Incumbent
