= Nitefreak =

Zimbabwean DJ and music producer

- Born: Bhekinkosi Melusi Mabhena; 21 September 1991 (age 34); Bulawayo, Zimbabwe
- Genres: House, Afro house
- Occupations: DJ; record producer
- Years active: 2009–present
- Labels: Deep Root Records; Spinnin' Deep; Grooveland Africa; Higher Ground (Mad Decent)

Bhekinkosi Melusi Mabhena (Zulu pronunciation: [ɓɛkʼiːnˈkɔːsi mɛˈluːsi maˈbʱɛːna]; born 21 September 1991), professionally known as Nitefreak, is a Zimbabwean DJ and record producer. He is associated with the Afro house genre and has released music through international electronic music labels, including Spinnin' Deep and Higher Ground. His 2021 remix of "Premier Gaou", co-produced with Francis Mercier, was certified gold by the Syndicat national de l'édition phonographique (SNEP) in France.

== Early life ==
Mabhena was born on 21 September 1991 in Bulawayo, Zimbabwe. He began DJing in 2009 after being introduced to the music production software FL Studio by a friend.

== Musical career ==
=== Early work ===
Nitefreak initially worked as a producer, creating instrumentals for local artists and building a catalogue of independent releases.

=== Breakthrough ===
In 2021, he released a remix of "Premier Gaou", originally performed by Magic System, in collaboration with Francis Mercier. The track received international airplay and was later certified gold by the Syndicat national de l'édition phonographique (SNEP).

=== Subsequent releases and recognition ===
In May 2023, Nitefreak was included in 1001Tracklists' "The Future of Dance" list, which highlights emerging electronic music artists.

The same year, he received multiple nominations at the Roil Bulawayo Arts Awards, winning in the categories of Outstanding Club DJ, Outstanding Song of the Year, and Outstanding Ambassador (Worldwide).

In November 2023, he released the single "Gorah", a collaboration with Emmanuel Jal.

=== Other activities ===
In February 2023, Nitefreak appeared in an interview alongside Francis Mercier and Michael Brun for Forbes, where they discussed their work and broader themes related to Black History Month.

== Musical style ==
Nitefreak's productions are generally associated with Afro house, combining electronic dance music structures with rhythmic elements drawn from African musical traditions. His work frequently involves collaborations with vocalists and producers from different regions.

== Recognition ==
Nitefreak has been included in industry-curated lists highlighting emerging electronic music artists, including 1001Tracklists' "Future of Dance" selection.

== Discography ==
=== Singles ===
==== As lead artist ====
Title	Year	Certification	Album
"Premier Gaou"	2021	SNEP: Gold	Non-album single
"Ode Ireti" (Remix)	2022	—	Non-album single
"Kamili"	2023	—	Non-album single
"Pesa Esengo"	2023	—	Non-album single
"Vom"	2023	—	Non-album single
"Desert Storm"	2023	—	Non-album single
"Ike Onu"	2023	—	Non-album single
"Gorah"	2023	—	Non-album single
"Savior"	2024	—	Non-album single
"Asara"	2024	—	Non-album single
"Gorah (Midnight Mix)"	2024	—	Non-album single
"Maithori"	2025	—	Non-album single
"Mulalo"	2025	—	Non-album single

== Awards and nominations ==
=== Roil Bulawayo Arts Awards ===
Year	Nominee / work	Award	Result	Ref.
2023	Himself	Outstanding Club DJ	Won	
2023	Himself	Outstanding Ambassador (Worldwide)	Won	
2023	Himself	Outstanding Male Artiste	Nominated	
2023	"Premier Gaou (Remix)"	Outstanding Song of the Year	Won	
2023		Outstanding Kwaito/House/Gqom	Nominated	
