= Pius Ncube =

Zimbabwean Roman Catholic archbishop

The Most Reverend Pius Ncube
- Archbishop Emeritus of Bulawayo
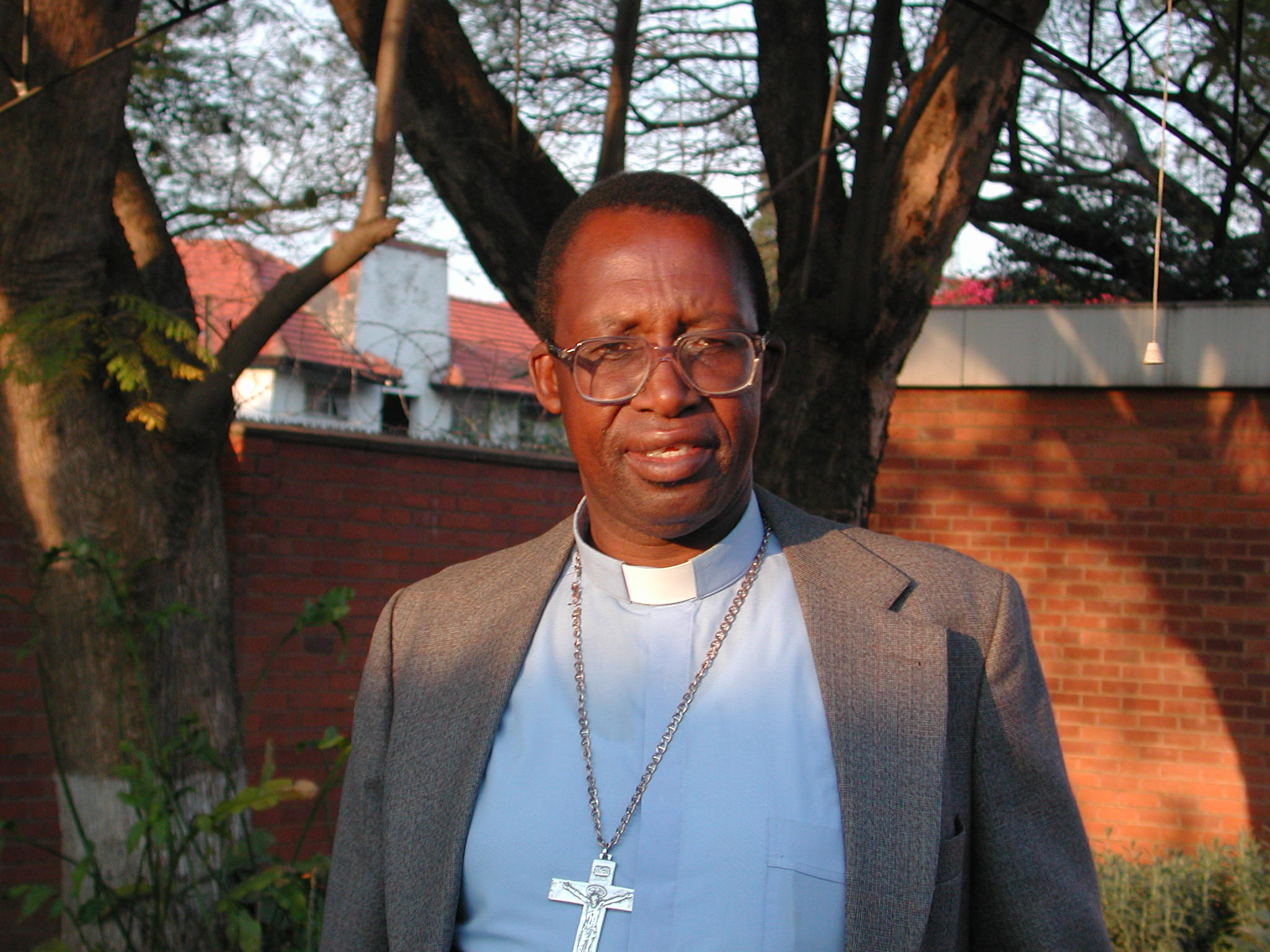
- Archbishop Pius Ncube
- Archdiocese: Archdiocese of Bulawayo
- Appointed: 24 October 1997
- Installed: 25 January 1998
- Term ended: 11 September 2007
- Predecessor: Ernst Heinrich Karlen
- Successor: Alex Kaliyanil

Orders
- Ordination: 26 August 1973
- Consecration: 25 January 1998 by Jozef Tomko

Personal details
- Born: Pius Alick Mvundla Ncube; 31 December 1946 (age 79) Filabusi, Southern Rhodesia
- Denomination: Roman Catholic

Styles of Pius Ncube
- Reference style: The Most Reverend
- Spoken style: Your Grace
- Religious style: Archbishop

Pius Alick Mvundla Ncube (born 31 December 1946) served as the Roman Catholic Archbishop of Bulawayo, Zimbabwe, until he resigned on 11 September 2007. Widely known for his human rights advocacy, Ncube was an outspoken critic of former President Robert Mugabe while he was in office.

== Biography ==
Archbishop Ncube received a Human Rights Award from Human Rights First on 23 October 2003 for speaking out against torture and confronting the Mugabe government for starving certain regions of Zimbabwe for political reasons. He has received many death threats for his activities. He is a member of Zimbabwe's minority Ndebele ethnic group.

Pius won the 2005 Robert Burns Humanitarian Award.

Previous elections in Zimbabwe have been plagued with violence and corruption. Believing that the 2005 Zimbabwe parliamentary elections would be fixed, Ncube called for a "popular mass uprising" in the style of the Orange Revolution or Tulip Revolution to remove Mugabe from power. "I hope people get so disillusioned that they really organize against this government and kick him out by non-violent popular mass uprising," Ncube said.

In response, Mugabe has called Ncube a half-wit and a liar. After the March 2005 elections, Ncube repeated his call for a peaceful rebellion. Referring to Mugabe, he said "I am praying that he goes home gently; at 84, he has lived a full life."

In March 2005 Information Minister Nathan Shamuyarira referred to Ncube as a "mad, inveterate liar. He has been lying for the past two years. He, however, fits into the scheme of the British and Americans, who are calling for regime change and are feeding him with these wild ideas. Archbishop Ncube's open call for an unconstitutional uprising shows he is an instrument of the West's illegal regime change agenda."

== Controversy ==
=== Alleged adultery ===
On 16 July 2007 a ZWD 20 billion adultery lawsuit (US$1.3 million at the official rate and US$154,000 on the black market) was filed against him. Ncube and his lawyers stated that the allegations were politically motivated; his lawyers described them as "some kind of orchestrated attempt to embarrass the archbishop".

Ncube was reported to have been involved with Rosemary Sibanda, estranged wife of Onesimus Sibanda, a Bulawayo resident. It was reported by some sources that Mrs. Sibanda admitted that she had had an affair with the Archbishop.

It was reported by other sources that the whole event was a government honey trap from the beginning, which was now falling apart. The lack of good quality reporting makes this issue unlikely to be resolved.

In the few days before 11 September 2007, images purporting to be of Ncube with Rosemary Sibanda in his bedroom were published in the Zimbabwean press. It was also reported in The Guardian that Zimbabwean TV had been showing a video of a man and woman, allegedly Ncube and Sibanda, repeatedly over a number of days. These events led to Ncube's decision to resign from his post.

On 11 September 2007, it was announced that Pope Benedict XVI had accepted the resignation of Archbishop Pius Alick Ncube from the pastoral government of the Roman Catholic Archdiocese of Bulawayo, in accordance with canon 401, section 2, of the Code of Canon Law, which states: "A diocesan bishop who has become less able to fulfill his office because of ill health or some other grave cause is earnestly requested to present his resignation from office." This resignation followed the publication of pictures of Ncube with Mrs. Rosemary Sibanda in the Zimbabwean press and elsewhere.

In a press statement Ncube said that he had made the decision to resign because of the "vicious attack not just on myself, but by proxy on the Catholic Church in Zimbabwe". He also mentioned that this was meant to "spare my fellow Bishops and the body of the Church any further attacks". He however stressed that he would remain a "Catholic Bishop in Zimbabwe", and would continue to "speak out on the issues that sadly become more acute by the day" in Zimbabwe. Archbishop Ncube was also quoted as saying: "I have not been silenced by the crude machinations of a wicked regime." The Zimbabwe government has frequently publicized evidence of sexual misconduct in efforts to diminish the public support of their critics.

=== Ncube's alleged mistress dies ===
On Friday, 2 May 2008, Rosemary Sibanda, the woman alleged to have had a sexual relationship with Archbishop Ncube died at Bulawayo's Mpilo Hospital, three days after she was admitted suffering from pneumonia.

=== Call for British invasion ===
Ncube mentioned that Britain would be justified in invading its former colony to rid it of Mugabe 1 July 2007. Ncube said Zimbabweans themselves should overthrow the government, but they are too scared. Ncube later distanced himself from the report, saying that the Thabo Mbeki-brokered efforts to end the crisis in Zimbabwe should be given a chance to work.

In March 2007, the cleric said he was ready to face bullets in anti-government protests to help bring democratic change in the southern African nation, which is mired in a deep economic and political crisis.

I'm ready to lead the people, guns blazing, but the people are not ready.

== See also ==
- Roman Catholic Archdiocese of Bulawayo

Catholic Church titles
Preceded by Ernst Heinrich Karlen	Archbishop of Bulawayo; 1997–2007	Succeeded by Alex Kaliyanil
