= Zimbabwe Women's Resource Centre and Network =

The Zimbabwe Women's Resource Centre and Network (ZWRCN) is a gender and development organization established in 1990 in Harare.

The ZWRCN published the magazine WomanPlus, and in 1995 collaborated with other women's organizations to publish Zimbabwe Women's Voices.
