= Radio Voice of the People =

Zimbabwean radio station

Radio Voice of the People (Radio VOP) is a radio station in Zimbabwe which broadcasts to the southern African region in English, Shona and Ndebele in the mornings and evenings on 9895 kHz and 7120 kHz on the 41-meter band respectively during the European summer and on higher frequencies thereafter.

In 2006 it won a One World Media special award.
