= Heinrich Karlen =

Swiss Prelate

The Most Reverend Heinrich Karlen C.M.M.
- Archbishop emeritus of Bulawayo
- Archdiocese: Archdiocese of Bulawayo
- Province: Bulawayo
- Appointed: 9 May 1974
- Term ended: 24 October 1997
- Predecessor: Adolph Gregory Schmitt, CMM
- Successor: Pius Ncube
- Previous post: Bishop of Umtata (1968-1974)

Orders
- Ordination: 22 June 1947
- Consecration: 3 December 1968 by John Gordon

Personal details
- Born: Ernst Heinrich Karlen; 1 February 1922 Törbel, Switzerland
- Died: 28 October 2012 (aged 90) Bulawayo, Zimbabwe
- Denomination: Roman Catholic

Styles of Ernst Heinrich Karlen
- Reference style: The Most Reverend
- Spoken style: Your Grace
- Religious style: Archbishop

Ernst Heinrich Karlen, C.M.M. (1 February 1922 – 28 October 2012) was a Swiss Prelate of the Roman Catholic Church.

== History ==
Karlen was born in Törbel, Switzerland, and was ordained a priest on 22 June 1947, for the religious order of the Congregation of Mariannhill Missionaries. On 26 September 1968 Karlen was appointed bishop of Umtata, South Africa and ordained on 3 December 1968. Karlen was appointed bishop of Bulawayo, Zimbabwe on 9 May 1974; he became Archbishop in 1994 when Bulawayo was raised to Archdiocese, and retired as such on 24 October 1997.

He died on 28 October 2012, in the hospital Mater Dei in Bulawayo, aged 90.

== See also ==
- Archdiocese of Bulawayo
- Diocese of Umtata

Catholic Church titles
Preceded by Joseph Grueter	Bishop of Umtata; 1968 - 1974	Succeeded by Peter Fanyana John Butelezi
Preceded by Adolph Gregory Schmitt	Archbishop of Bulawayo; 1974 - 1997	Succeeded by Pius Ncube
