= Sanyati =

- Town
- Sanyati located in Zimbabwe Map
- Coordinates: 17°57′00″S 29°18′27″E
- Country: Zimbabwe
- Province: Mashonaland West
- District: Kadoma District
- City: Sanyati Municipality
- Elevation: 850 m (2,790 ft)

Population (2004 Estimate)
  - Total: 2,918
- Time zone: UTC+2 (CAT)
- Climate: Cwa

Sanyati is a town in Zimbabwe.

== Location ==
The town is located in Kadoma District, in Mashonaland West Province, in northern central Zimbabwe. This location is about 100 kilometres (62 mi), by road, northwest of the city of Kadoma, where the district headquarters are located. Sanyati is located on the east bank of the Sanyati River, about 60 kilometres (37 mi), by road, northeast of the town of Gokwe, on the opposite side of the river. The coordinates of Sanyati are: 17° 57' 0.00"S, 29° 18' 27.00"E (Latitude:17.9500; Longitude:29.3075).

== Overview ==
The town of Sanyati and the surrounding sub-district known as Sanyati Subdistrict lie in an area known as the Sanyati Tribal Trust Lands, which is a major cotton-producing area in Zimbabwe. The town is the location of Sanyati Baptist Mission. The mission owns and administers: (a) Sanyati Baptist Hospital (b) Sanyati Baptist Primary School and (c) Sanyati Baptist High School. In the central business district, the main activities include welding, carpentry and masonry. Activities related to farming (farm supply shops and produce purchase points) are also prevalent in the town. ZB Bank Limited, a commercial bank, and Share Wealth (Pvt) Ltd, a microfinance service, maintain branches in town. The town is also served by Sanyati Baptist Mission Airport. A lodge is also available by the name Sanyati Rendezvous, located next to council offices.

== History ==
Chenjiri farms is the home town of Fungai Chaderopa, who became the first Sanyati woman member of parliament in March 2008.

== Population ==
In 2022, the population of the town was estimated at 139,235. The current population of the town is not publicly known.

== See also ==
- Harare
- Economy of Zimbabwe
- Clyde Dotson
- Sanyati District
