= Great Dyke =

Geological feature in Zimbabwe

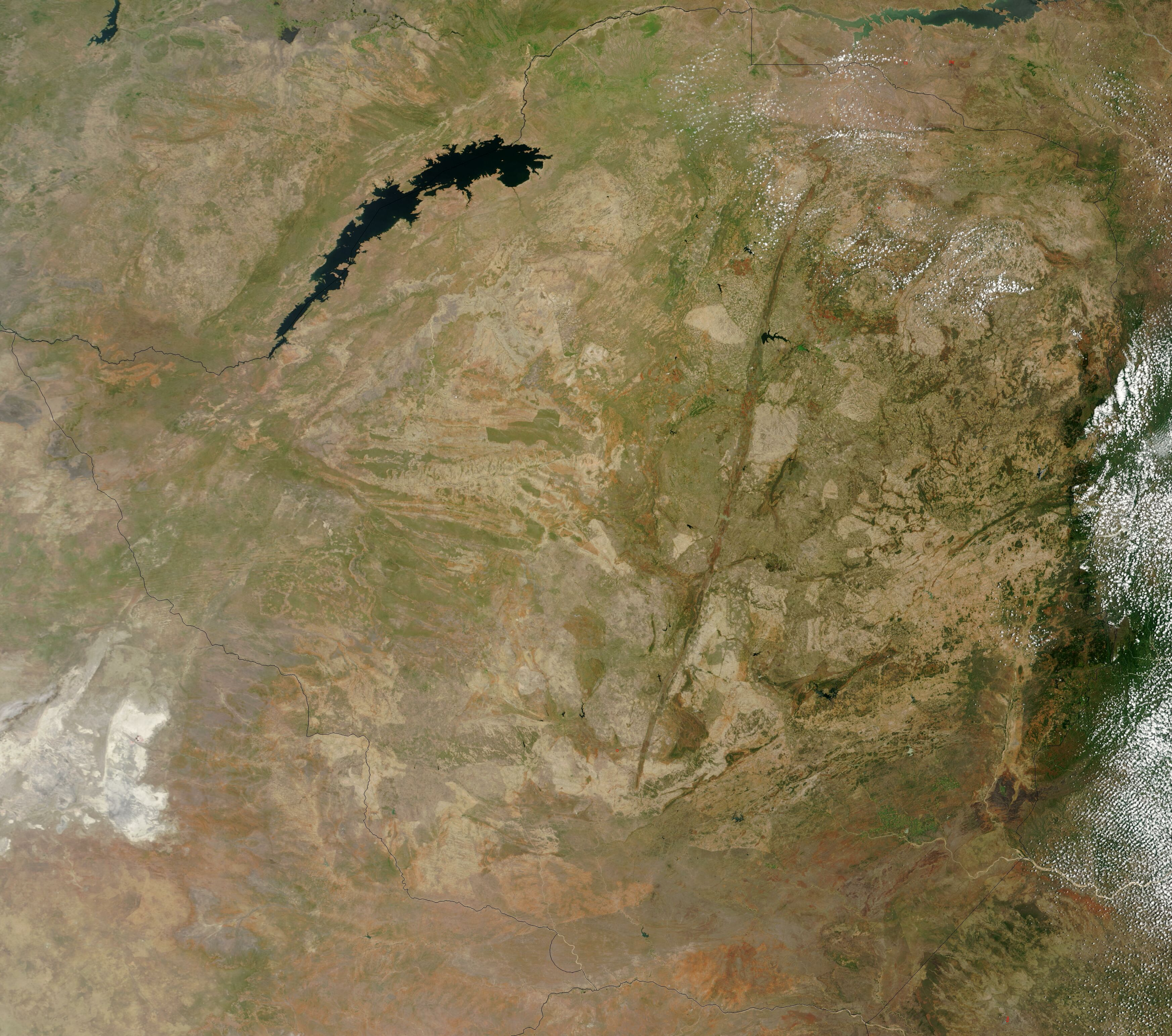
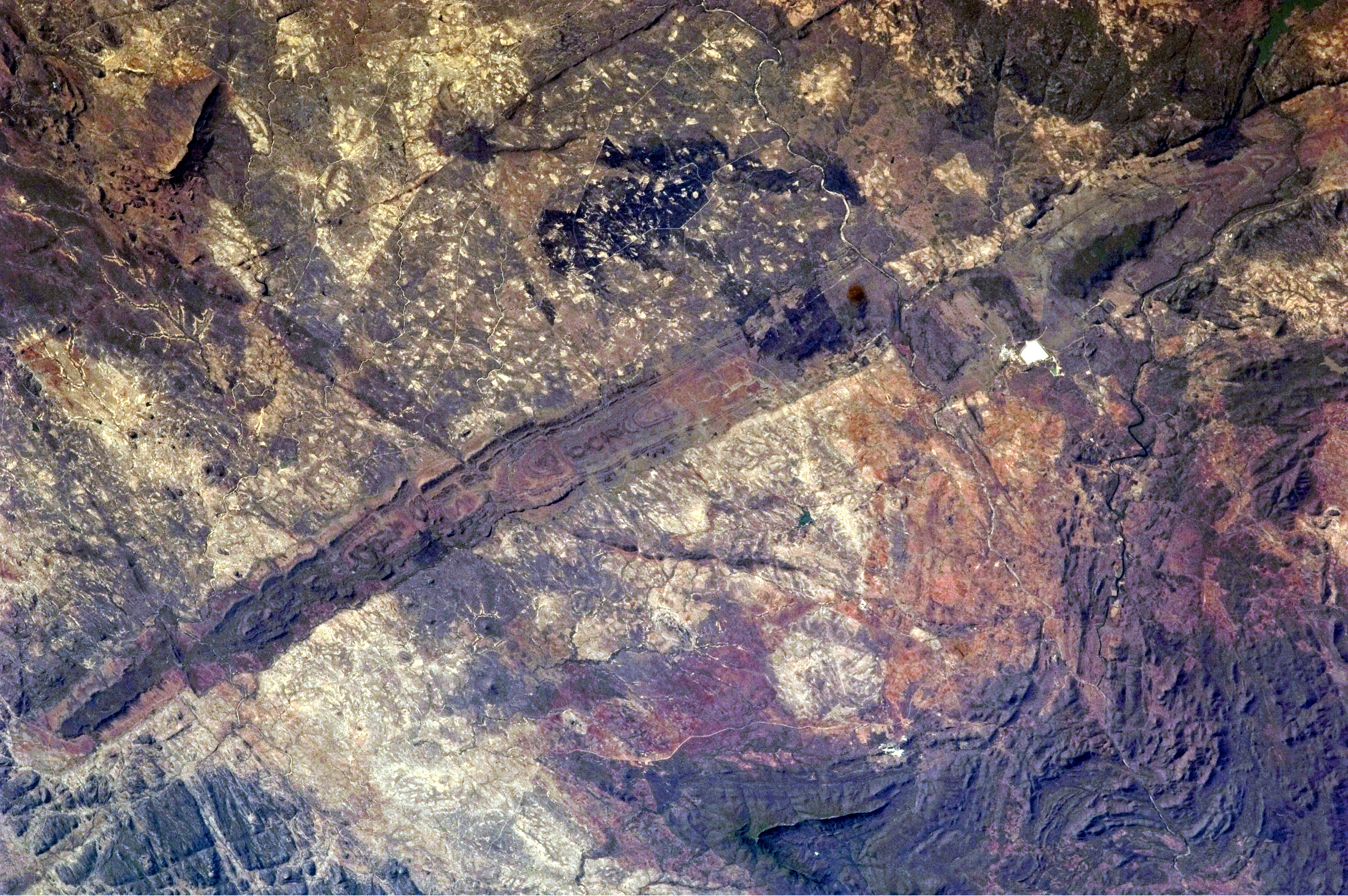
Left – The Great Dyke can be seen as linear feature, running from north-east to south-west in this satellite view of Zimbabwe. Right – The southern end of the dyke is captured in this astronaut photograph.

The Great Dyke or Dike is a linear geological feature that trends nearly north-south through the centre of Zimbabwe passing just to the west of the capital, Harare. It consists of a band of short, narrow ridges and hills spanning for approximately 550 kilometres (340 mi). The hills become taller as the range goes north, and reach up to 460 metres (1,510 ft) above the Mvurwi Range. The range is host to vast ore deposits, including gold, silver, chromium, platinum, nickel and asbestos.

Northern end	16°27′51″S 31°08′24″E
Southern end	20°50′22″S 29°39′04″E

== Geology and soils ==
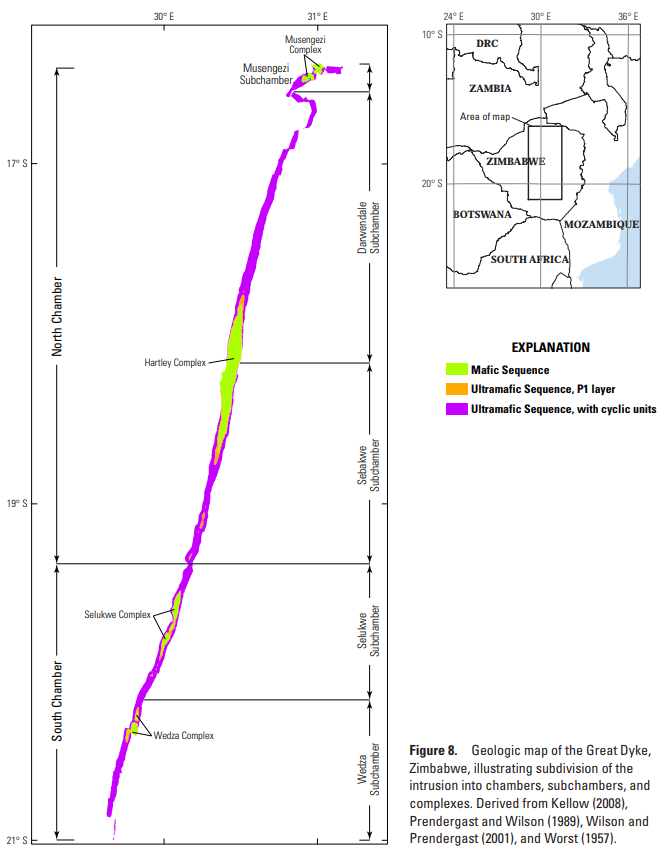
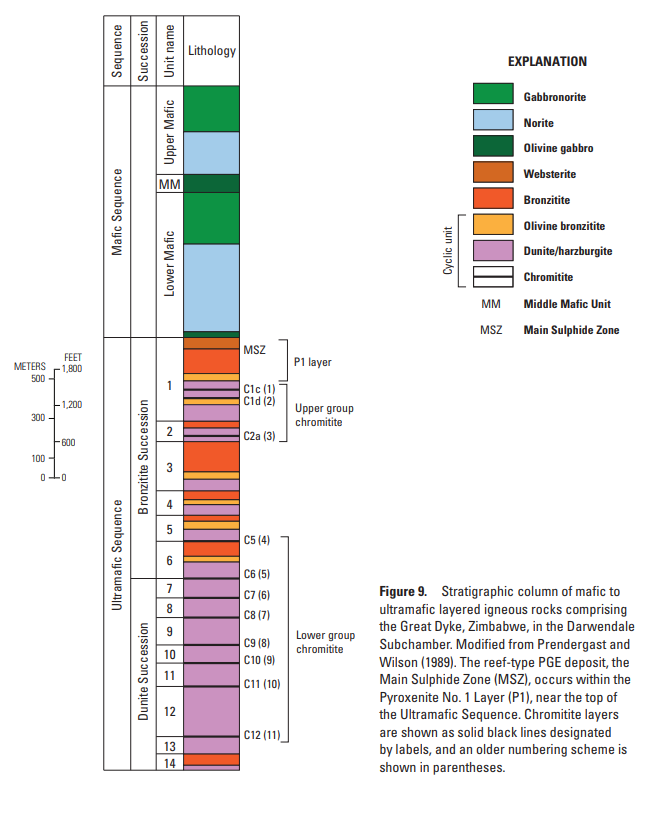
Geological map and stratigraphic column

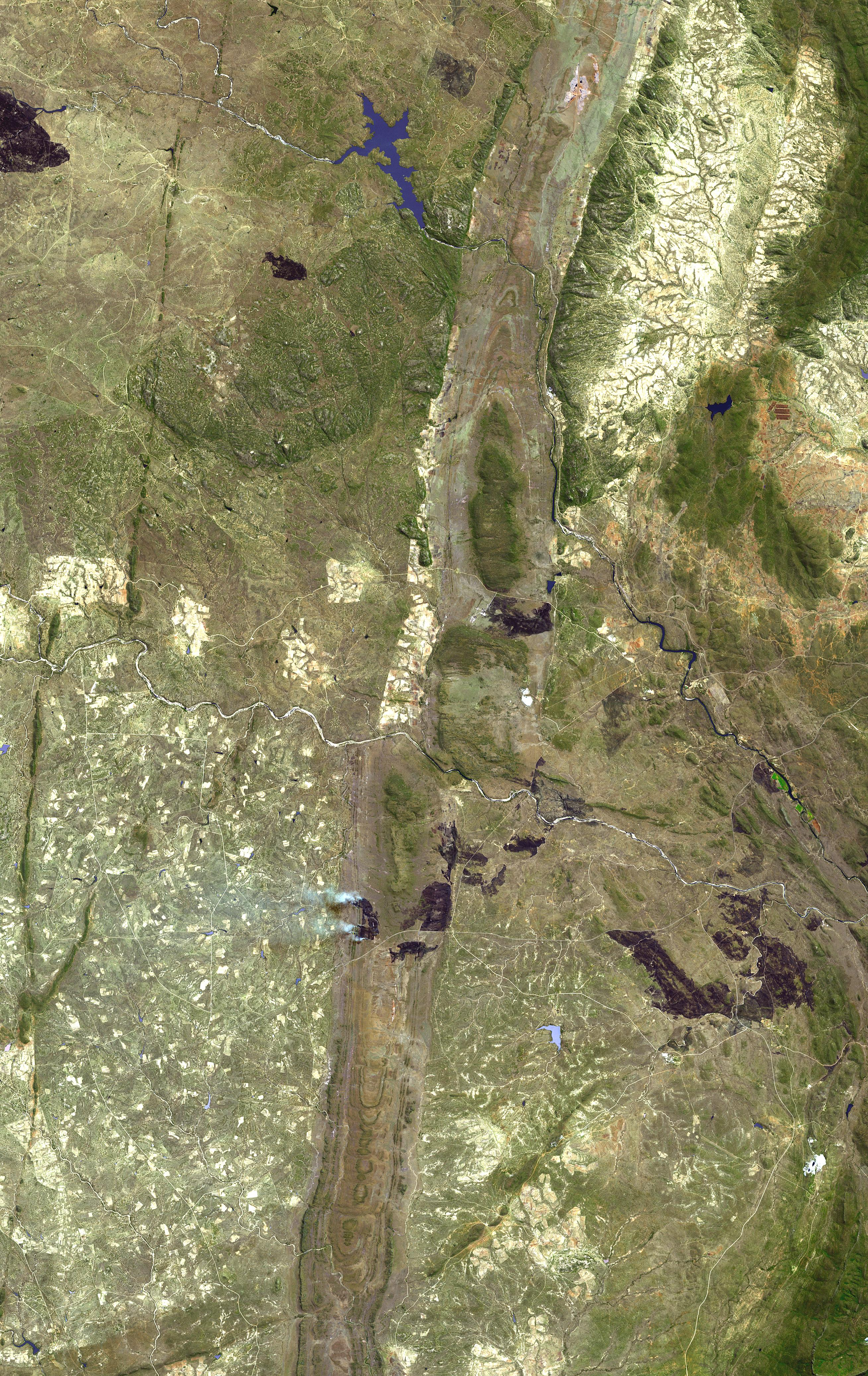
Wedza Subchamber of the Great Dyke. Mimosa Platinum Mine is located near the heavily wooded section in the centre. The Umvimeela Dyke is visible to the far left of the scene.

Geologically the Great Dyke is not a dyke, but is lopolithic and Y-shaped in cross-section. It is a group of layered ultramafic intrusions that extend across Zimbabwe with a strike of about N20°E. The width of the intrusions vary from 3 to 12 km (1.9 to 7.5 mi). The Great Dyke is unusual in that most ultramafic layered intrusions display near horizontal sill or sheet forms.

The well-layered lower units of ultramafic rocks comprising the Great Dyke are locally overlain by erosional remnants of gabbroic rock. These mark the centres of the four sub-chambers within the Great Dyke magma system, namely (from north to south) Musengezi, Darwendale, Sebakwe, and Wedza. Each of these sub-chambers has an elongate, doubly plunging synclinal structure, and was fed by a feeder dyke continuous below almost the entire Great Dyke. Stratigraphically, each sub-chamber is divided into a lower Ultramafic Sequence of dunites, harzburgites, olivine bronzitites, and pyroxenites together with narrow layers of chromitite that constitute the bases of cyclic units and that are extensively mined along the Great Dyke, and an upper Mafic Sequence mainly consisting of a variety of plagioclase-rich rocks, such as norites, gabbronorites and olivine gabbros.

The dyke lies within the Zimbabwe Craton and has been dated at 2.575 billion years old. The Great Dyke acts as a strain-marker for the craton: The fact that it has been undeformed since intrusion (excluding the Musengezi area) shows that the craton had stabilised by the time the Dyke intruded.

Two mafic dykes, the East and Umvimeela, flank the Great Dyke to the east and west respectively. Volcanic surface manifestation of the Great Dyke event has not been recorded and have probably been eroded.

Soils on the Great Dyke are strongly influenced by the underlying bedrock. Shallow, infertile Lithosols over ultramafic rock dominate the northern and southern ends. Best for agriculture are those reddish brown granular clays developed over mafic rock in the central area. Ultramafic rock in the central area supports a complex association of moderately deep to deep dark self-churning clay, and moderately deep reddish brown kaolin-rich clay.

The Great Dyke is a strategic economic resource with significant quantities of chrome and platinum. Chromite occurs to the base of the Ultramafic Sequence and is mined throughout the dyke. Below the Ultramafic-Mafic sequences' contact, and in the uppermost pyroxenite (bronzitite and websterite) units are economic concentrations of nickel, copper, cobalt, gold, and platinum group metals (PGM). The base metals occur as disseminated inter-cumulus Fe-Ni-Cu sulfides within an interval referred to as the base metal subzone, below which is a sublayer enriched in platinum group metals called the PGE subzone. The base metal and PGE subzones together, make up the Main Sulphide Zone (MSZ).

== Development ==
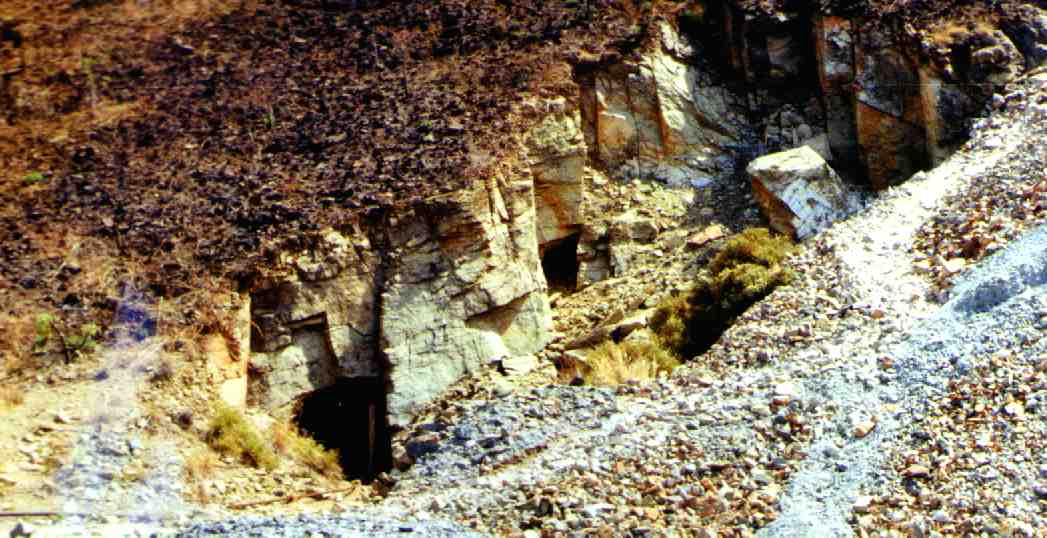
Entrance to the adit of a chromite mine, Mutorashanga.

The Great Dyke was first reported in 1867 by the explorer Karl Mauch. However the existence of platinum was not realized until 1918, and mining of oxidized ores did not start until in 1924.

Chromite is mined throughout the Dyke, especially in the Darwendale, Lalapanzi and Mutorashanga areas. The three largest chrome mining companies are Maranatha Ferrochrome, Zimalloys, and Zimasco, although most mines are worked by the tribute system.

Platinum-group metals are currently mined at Ngezi Mine south of Selous by Zimplats of the Impala Platinum Group, at Unki Mine near Shurugwi by Anglo American and at Mimosa Mine near Zvishavane by Zimasco for Impala Platinum. The Hartley Platinum Mine near Makwiro is not currently operating. Oxidized, near-surface ores are a promising future source for platinum-group metals because of their easy accessibility. They constitute a resource of c. 160–400 Mt, but mining has so far been hampered due to insufficient recovery rates.

== See also ==
- Caesar, Zimbabwe
- Darwendale
- Lalapanzi
- Makwiro
- Mutorashanga
- Mvurwi Range
- Platinum in Africa
- Vanad
