= Alaska, Zimbabwe =

Alaska
- Location in Zimbabwe
- Coordinates: 17°22′30″S 30°03′54″E
- Country: Zimbabwe
- Province: Mashonaland West
- Districts of Zimbabwe: Makonde District
- Municipality: Alaska Municipality
- Elevation: 3,900 ft (1,200 m)

Population (2002)
  - Total: 3,846
- Time zone: UTC+2 (CAT)
- Climate: Cwa

Alaska is a small town in central northern Zimbabwe in Makonde District, Mashonaland West Province.

== Location ==
The town is located approximately 15 kilometres (9.3 mi) west of the city of Chinhoyi, the location of the district and provincial headquarters. Approximately 7 kilometres (4.3 mi) to the northeast of Alaska are the Chinhoyi Caves in the Chinhoyi Caves National Park, a local tourist attraction. The town sits at an elevation of 1,180 metres (3,870 ft), above sea level.

== History ==
Alaska grew up around the eponymous Alaska Mine, where pre-colonial miners are believed to have mined about a million tonnes of ore. Messina Transvaal Development Company (MTD) started producing copper in 1959 and the mine closed in 1977. MTD built a smelter nearby in 1966 and a refinery in 1980. Other mines in the district also produced copper flotation concentrate which was brought to Alaska for smelting and refining. These mines included MTD's Mhangura copper mine in Mhangura and Shackleton mine.

The smelter and refinery closed in late 2000, by which time most of the mines feeding it had to close, devastating the local economy and plunging the town's inhabitants into poverty. Periodic reports of Chinese investment reopening the mine and smelter have not come to fruition.

== Population ==
According to the 1982 Population Census, the town had a population of 3,854. By 2002 its population stood at 3,846 people.

== See also ==
- Districts of Zimbabwe
- Provinces of Zimbabwe
- Economy of Zimbabwe
