= Mwami, Zimbabwe =

Settlement in Zimbabwe

Mwami
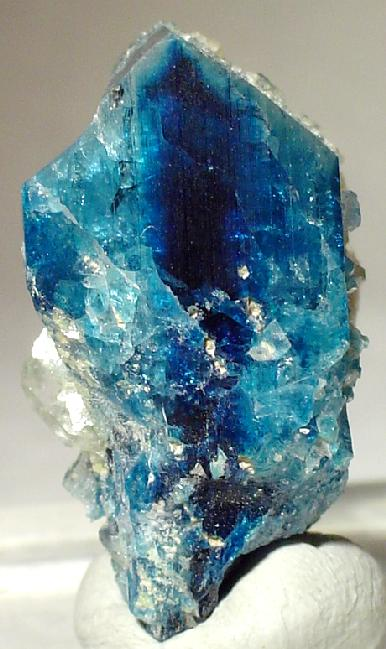
- Rich blue Euclase crystal from the Lost Hope Mine, near Mwami, Zimbabwe

- Location within Zimbabwe
- Coordinates: 16°40′10″S 29°46′30″E
- Country: Zimbabwe
- Province: Mashonaland West
- District: Hurungwe District
- Elevation: 1,246 m (4,088 ft)
- Time zone: UTC+2 (CAT)
  - Summer (DST): UTC+2 (not observed)
- Area code: 029
- Climate: Cwa

Mwami is a settlement in the province of Mashonaland West, Zimbabwe.

== Location ==
Mwami is located approximately 33 kilometres (21 mi), by road, north-east of Karoi, the nearest large town, and the location of the district headquarters. This is approximately 120 kilometres (75 mi), by road, north-west of Chinhoyi, the nearest large city and the location of the provincial headquarters. Mwami is located approximately 235 kilometres (146 mi), by road, north-west of Harare, the capital and largest city in Zimbabwe.

The geographical coordinates of Mwami, Zimbabwe are:16°40'10.0"S, 29°46'30.0"E (Latitude:-16.669444, Longitude:29.775000). Mwami sits at an average elevation of 1,246 metres (4,088 ft) above mean sea level.

== Overview ==
Mwami, Zimbabwe was formerly known as Miami and was renamed in the early 1980s.

== Minerals ==
The area around Mwami, Zimbabwe is known to contain topaz, quartz and andalusite. Large crystals of euclase have been mined from the area.

== Health ==
The community is served by Mwami Hospital, a public health facility.

== See also ==
- List of cities and towns in Zimbabwe
