= Shackleton, Zimbabwe =

Village in Mashonaland West province, Zimbabwe

Shackleton is a village in Mashonaland West province in Zimbabwe, near the Chinhoyi region.

It is known for the Shackleton Copper Mine, an underground copper mine which was established in 1960 and began production in 1971. The ore is described by Mindat as "sedimentary copper deposit, hosted in calcareous argillite and arkose".

In 2000, Shackleton was shut down, as copper mining declined. Along with Mhangura, Sutton, Vanad, and Kildonan, the mining towns became ghost towns, changing from thriving communities to impoverished small villages.
