= Kildonan, Zimbabwe =

Village in Mashonaland West, Zimbabwe

Coordinates: 17°20′43″S 30°36′37″E

Kildonan, Zimbabwe is a village in Mashonaland West Province in Zimbabwe.

It was known for its copper mine, but around 2000, as copper mining declined, mines across Zimbabwe were shut down. Along with Mhangura, Sutton, Vanad, and Shackleton, the mining towns became ghost towns, changing from thriving communities to impoverished small villages. and began production in 1971.
