= Magunje =

- Growth Point
- Location within Zimbabwe
- Coordinates: 16°50′22.27″S 29°25′31.14″E
- Country: Zimbabwe
- Province: Mashonaland West
- District: Hurungwe District
- Time zone: UTC+2 (CAT)
- Climate: Cwa

Magunje is the largest village and principal growth point in Hurungwe Communal Land, Mashonaland West Province, Zimbabwe. Magunje is located approximately 35 km west-north-west of Karoi town. Magunje has three secondary schools. The schools are Magunje Government High School, Magunje Barracks Secondary School and Charles Clack Mission, a Salvation Army mission school. There is a Zimbabwe National Army base, Magunje Barracks located in Magunje. Magunje was one of many Tribal Trust Lands (TTL) established by the colonial government of Ian Smith to designate the indigenous Black Africans.
