= Kadoma =

Kadoma may refer to:

- Kadoma, Osaka, Japan
- Kadoma, Zimbabwe
- Kadoma District, Zimbabwe
