= Mwami (disambiguation) =

Mwami is an honorific title common in parts of Central and East Africa.

Mwami may also refer to:

- Mwami, Zambia, a town in Zambia
- Mwami, Zimbabwe, a town in Zimbabwe
