= Selous =

Selous is the Anglicised form of the Dutch name Slous. It may refer to:

== People ==
- Andrew Selous (born 1962), British politician
- Edmund Selous (1857–1934), British ornithologist and writer
- Frederick Selous (1851–1917), British explorer and big-game hunter
- Henry Courtney Selous (1803–1890), British painter

== Other ==
- Selous Game Reserve, Tanzania
- Selous Scouts, the special forces of the Rhodesian Army
- Selous, Zimbabwe
- Selous' mongoose (Paracynictis selousi)
- Selous' zebra (Equus quagga selousi)
