= Operation Pagoda =

- Part of the Rhodesian Bush War and the Second Chimurenga
- Operation Pagoda (Zimbabwe)
Date	16 May – 18 September 1966
Location	Hartley, Rhodesia
Result	Rhodesian victory

Belligerents
Rhodesia	ZANLA (ZANU)

Commanders and leaders
(Rhodesia) Unknown	Unknown

Units involved
Rhodesian Army: RLI; 1 Commando; BSAP	Unknown

Strength
Unknown	7 cadres

Casualties and losses
None	7 killed
- 2 civilians killed

Operation Pagoda was launched on 16 May 1966 by the Rhodesian Government in response to the murder of a farmer, Johannes Viljoen, and his wife at their farm just north of Hartley. 1 Commando of the Rhodesian Light Infantry and units of the British South Africa Police were deployed to kill or capture the terrorists.

The BSAP ended up doing most of the work in Operation Pagoda because the local police commanders were reluctant at this time to sign control over to the army. The RLI was given little opportunity to act.
