= Mutorashanga =

Mining town in Zimbabwe

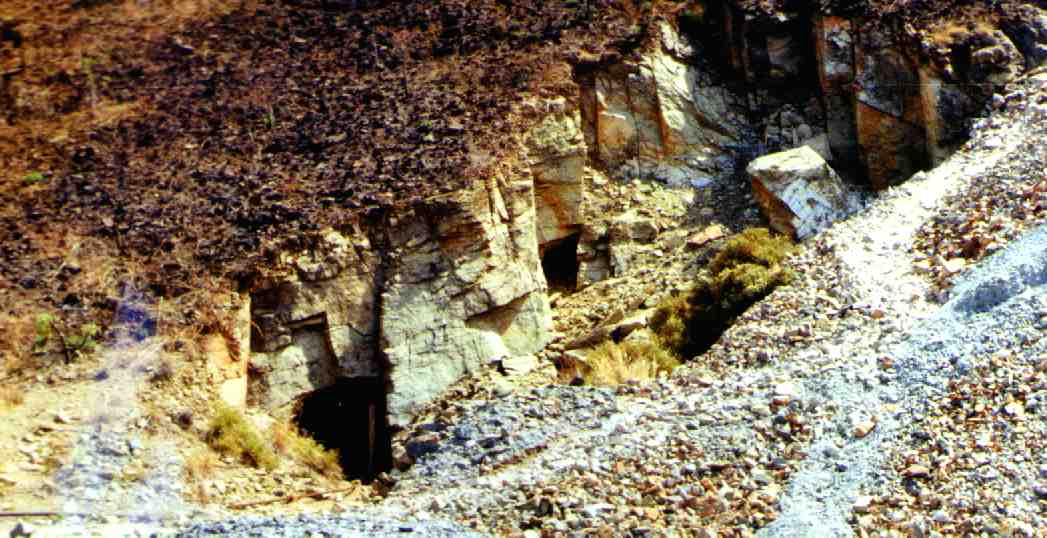
Entrance of an adit of a chromite mine, Mutorashanga

Mutorashanga is a small ferrochrome mining town in Mashonaland West province in Zimbabwe. Situated on Zimbabwe's Great Dyke mountain range, about 100 kilometers north of the capital, Harare. The mines at Mutorashanga are largely owned by Zimasco, a chrome mining company owned in turn by Sinosteel Corporation, although some are operated by contractors. The area is well known for its abundant aloes, now threatened by mining, and other endemic flora. Aloe Ortholopha is endemic to the section of the Great Dyke mountain range in the Mutorashanga area.

Zimasco operates ferrochrome mines in Shurugwi and Lalapanzi in Zimbabwe's Midlands Province. It also operates Zimbabwe's largest ferrochrome smelter in the Midlands town of Kwekwe.

Muriel Gold Mine, south of Mutorashanga, also forms part of the sub-district. Mutorashanga falls under the administration of Lomagundi District in Mashonaland West Province and sits on the border of Mashonaland Central Province. The "town" consists of the mines, a police station, a post office, a Zimbabwe Electricity Supply Authority Office and small trading stores. Mutorashanga has no urban status. The town sits on the Lone Cow Farm and on Umvukwes Ranch and its extensions. Until 2000, when large-scale farmers were displaced, the area was a tobacco-growing district. Farmers also grew corn (maize), soy and winter wheat.

Ethel mine (Coordinates: 17°3′54″S 30°42′24″E) 10 km north of Mutorashanga is a flooded Asbestos quarry. The mine is used by diving clubs and swimmers (the water is very clear, and there are several 'wrecks' at the bottom). There was a Mutorashanga Triathlon held here for a few years (~2000). The quarry is known as the "Green Pool."

Water in the Green Pool is algae-free because of intense mineral content and it is unsuitable for agriculture. Water running in streams, mainly seasonal, off the Great Dyke is potable but not used for agriculture until it has passed through a granite range that runs adjacent to the Dyke. The chrome and salt content of the water keep the water clear, a rare occurrence in Zimbabwe outside of the Eastern Highlands. Chrome Fines, a black, shiny powder-like substance, lies freely on the ground in many parts of the town, particularly after it has rained. Few plants grow well on the mineralised soils of Mutorashanga, making it unsuitable for agriculture or grazing. Waterberry trees and phoenix palms are indigenous and grow on stream banks.

Ferrochrome mining in Mutorashanga began commercially in 1921 with the Rhodesian Chrome Corp. Ltd. Ownership has changed hands several times and has included, but not been limited to, Union Carbide.

The name derives from the Shona language spoken by 80 percent of Zimbabweans. Mutora - you take or carry, shanga - maize (corn) stalks. Residents say the name was incorrectly written by white administrators and that shanga should be shangu, or shoes, a reference to the stony ground that characterizes the area.

Most residents of the town are mineworkers and their families who live in a series of company-owned villages from Kutanga Village in the south to Ethel Village in the north. A single tarred road, owned by the mining companies in the area, runs through the town and all other roads are gravel. The mine road runs from Mapinga on the Harare-Chirundi Highway to the turn-off to the Victory Block, a former large-scale farming area developed after the end of World War II. The tar road makes it easier for miners to move ferrochrome ore to the Kildonan Railway Siding south of Mutorashanga.

Mutorashanga has several primary and one secondary school. A small hospital, owned by Zimasco, provides limited health care and maternity services.
