= Mhangura =

Mhangura Mangula
- Town
- Mhangura located in Zimbabwe Map
- Coordinates: 16°54′S 30°09′E
- Country: Zimbabwe
- Province: Mashonaland West
- District: Doma

Population (1982)
  - Total: 11,175
- Time zone: UTC+2 (CAT)
- Climate: Cwb (Subtropical highland)

Mhangura, formerly Mangula, is a small town and former mining community in the Doma District of Mashonaland West Province, in northern Zimbabwe.

== Geography ==
It is located 188 kilometres (117 mi) northwest of Harare. The name was probably derived from the Shona word mhangura meaning "red metal", in reference to copper.

== History ==
In the 1960s the Messina Transvaal Development Company (MTD) developed what was at that time called the Mangula Copper Mines Ltd (MCM). They registered the company, MTD (Mangula) Ltd, on the stock exchange. Soon after independence, MTD sold their assets to ZMDC, a parastatal.

The mineworkers lived in compounds, while the mostly white bosses lived in suburbs, and had their own sports club. In the 1960s and 1970s, the town was known for its football team, the Copper Stars, including players like the Chieza brothers. There were games at the stadium every alternate Sunday, which were enthusiastically attended.

When fully operational, around 1500 full-time workers were employed in mining, and others were employed in sanitation, security, and mine-related services.

The name of the town was changed after Zimbabwean independence on 18 April 1980; new names for 32 places were gazetted on 18 April 1982.

Mhangura Copper Mines Ltd, a subsidiary of Zimbabwe Mining Development Corporation, operated one of the biggest copper mines in the country here. All mining was closed in the late 1990s, due to falling prices on the world copper market. Other mining towns, such as Shackleton, Sutton, Vanad, Kildonan, and Alaska, also became ghost towns, changing from thriving communities to impoverished small villages.

The workforce was reduced to 800 when the mine closed, and its local economy, which had centred on extracting and milling copper, collapsed. Local banks and shops closed down. By 2014 the town's water, power, and sanitation infrastructure were failing.

In 2022, a private investor was looking for backers to restart exploration at Mhangura, and the Zimbabwean Government engaged Scout Aerial Africa to undertake an Aeromagnetic survey, and produce a drilling programme, with maps showing potential areas to target for mining, within the Shackleton claims and Mhangura extension.

== Demographics ==
Mhangura had a population of 11,175 in the 1982 census; by 1992, only 5,747; and in 2012, there were only 2,930 people living in the town. Population was not recorded in the 2022 census.

== People ==
Zimbabwean cricketer Natsai Mushangwe comes from Mhangura.

The sprinter Artwell Mandaza (c.1946–2019), nicknamed the "Mangula Meteor", lived in Mhangura. On 28 June 1969, he became the fastest man in Rhodesian athletics history. At the Salisbury Police track he beat Springbok Sakkie van Zyl in the 100m race, breaking Johan du Preez's six-year-old Rhodesian record of 10.5 seconds, achieving 1.3 seconds. He was coached by British athletics and football coach Ray Batchelor, who also coached the "Copper Stars", the local Mangula football team.

Notable football players included John Phiri, the seven Chieza brothers (in particular Tendai Chieza), and many others.

== See also ==
- Zimbabwe Mining Index
- Copper mining in Africa
