= Chegutu =

Chegutu Hartley
- Coat of arms

- Location within Zimbabwe
- Coordinates: 18°08′24″S 30°09′00″E
- Country: Zimbabwe
- Province: Mashonaland West
- District: Chegutu District
- City: Chegutu Municipality
- Elevation: 1,180 m (3,870 ft)

Population (2022 census)
  - Total: 65,800
- Time zone: UTC+2 (CAT)
- Climate: Cwa

Chegutu, originally known as Hartley, is a town in Mashonaland West Province, Zimbabwe.

== Location ==
The town is located in Chegutu District, Mashonaland West, in central northern Zimbabwe. It lies in the Hartley Hills 107 kilometres (66 mi) southwest of the capital Harare at an altitude of 1,180 metres (3,870 ft) above sea level.

== Population ==
The 1982 population census recorded 19,621 inhabitants, rising to 30,122 by 1992. The population was estimated at 36,000 in 2002. By 2012 it had grown to 50,590 inhabitants.

== Transportation ==
Chegutu lies on the A5 highway between Harare and Bulawayo. It is also on the railway line between the two cities. Secondary roads link it to Chinhoyi, Chakari, and the Mhondoro communal lands and Msengezi small-scale commercial farms.

== Climate ==
The annual rainfall in Chegutu averages 775 millimetres (30.5 in). The town's mean temperatures vary between 23 °C in the hottest month to 14 °C in the coldest.

== Economy ==
Chegutu is the commercial and administrative centre of the surrounding district. Having been established as a mining settlement by gold prospectors, mining for gold and nickel remains important in the area. Its agricultural economy was developed significantly after the Second World War, with maize and cotton becoming major crops. One of Zimbabwe's largest textile mills was established there. Wheat is grown with the aid of irrigation from the nearby Mupfure River, and cattle rearing is also a significant activity. The Cotton and Grain Marketing Boards established depots in Chegutu for cotton and grain respectively, and by 1984 16 grain silos had been built in the town for the bulk storage and delivery of grain.

The town has 12 large grain silos, each capable of holding 5,000 tons of grain, but most are unused.

Banking facilities include CABS, CBZ Limited, Stanbic, AgriBank, and Steward Bank.

== Schools ==
There are ten primary schools in Chegutu: Bryden Country School, David Whitehead Primary School, Hartley Number 1 Primary School, Chinengundu Primary School, Chegutu Primary School, Kaguvi Primary School, Pfupajena Primary School, Our Lady of Sorrow Primary School, Hartley Number 2 Primary School, and St Francis Primary School; and four secondary schools offering up to advanced level: St Francis High School (Chegutu)|St Francis High School, Pfupajena High School, Adventist High School, and Chegutu High School.

Most of the schools are government-owned. The local municipality owns 2 primary schools; 3 schools are owned by the Catholic Church, St Francis Primary and Secondary owned by the Archdiocese of Harare, and Our Lady owned by the Catholic nuns of the order Our Lady of Sorrow. The Methodist Church in Zimbabwe owns one primary school, Chegutu Primary, and the Seventh-day Adventist Church owns one secondary school. There are also a number of privately owned colleges offering primary and secondary education, but some are registered while some are yet to be registered.

== Suburbs ==
There are four high-density suburbs: Chinengundu, Pfupajena, Chegutu, and Kaguvi (Phase 1–4) and one medium-density suburb, Umvovo. Pfupajena is popularly known as "kumaPee" and Chegutu known as "kumaCee". To most people, Chinengundu suburb is known as Heroes and the other part as ZMDC as the mining giant had built its staff houses in the area.

The low-density suburbs are Hartley Hills, Hintonville, and Rifle Range.

== Sporting facilities ==
There is one football stadium, Pfupajena Stadium, and one golf course which houses the Chegutu Country Club. The local municipality owns one swimming pool.

== History ==
Before 1982, Chegutu was known as Hartley, named after Henry Hartley, an early hunter and explorer. The settlement of Hartley was originally located in the Hartley Hills 34 kilometres (21 mi) east of where the town is located today. White settlers flocked to the area after gold was discovered and the Butterfly and Giant Mines were both established nearby. The settlement was moved to its present location in 1899. In 1901 the railway reached Hartley, which was proclaimed a village in 1903 and a town in 1942. A Town Council was established in 1968 and in 1974 Hartley was granted municipality status. In 1982 the town's name was officially changed to Chegutu.

== Mayors of Chegutu ==
Year	Name	Party
2023–	Rydes Machekera	MDC-A
2013-2018	Wadzingenyama	MDC-T
2008-2013	Wadzingenyama	MDC-T
2006-2008	Zimani	ZANU PF
2001–2006	Francis Dhlakama	MDC-T
1996–2001	William Muringani	
1993–1996	Cephas Nyandoro	
1989–1992	Peter Gwanzura	
1986–1988	Cephas Teguru Nyandoro	
1981–1985	Bizek Mapuranga	

== Notable people ==
- Rick Cosnett, actor

== See also ==
- Provinces of Zimbabwe
- Districts of Zimbabwe
