= Darwendale =

- town
- Location within Zimbabwe
- Coordinates: 17°43′S 30°33′E
- Country: Zimbabwe
- Province: Mashonaland West
- District: Zvimba

Population (1982 census)
  - Total: 3,264
- Time zone: UTC+2 (CAT)

Darwendale is a small town in southern Zvimba District of Mashonaland West, Zimbabwe, on the Gwebi River. It is located about 62 kilometres (39 mi) west of Harare. According to the 1982 census, the village had a population of 3,264. Darwendale is regarded as one of Zimbabwe's fastest growing towns.

The village grew from Otto Christian Zimmerman's farm which was pegged out in the 1890s to grow tobacco. This once productive tobacco producing node of Zimbabwe is now mainly visited for fishing in Darwendale Dam which boasts largemouth bass where the largest catch outside of the United States and Mexico was recorded on July 25, 2004, weighing 8.2 kilograms. The Darwendale recreational park, located in the area closest to the dam wall, is home to various game. The most prevalent species are sable, kudu, waterbuck, bush pig, reedbuck, common duiker, warthog, baboon, vervet monkey, oribi and porcupine.

In the 1920s chromium mines were opened along the Great Dyke in the Lomagundi district both north and south of town. Darwendale centre used to be a town where people from the nearby mines would come to do their everyday shopping. However due to the decline in the value of chrome mined in the Great Dyke, the town centre has more recently deteriorated greatly. Grand Dyke Mines is planning on opening two platinum mines in the area.
