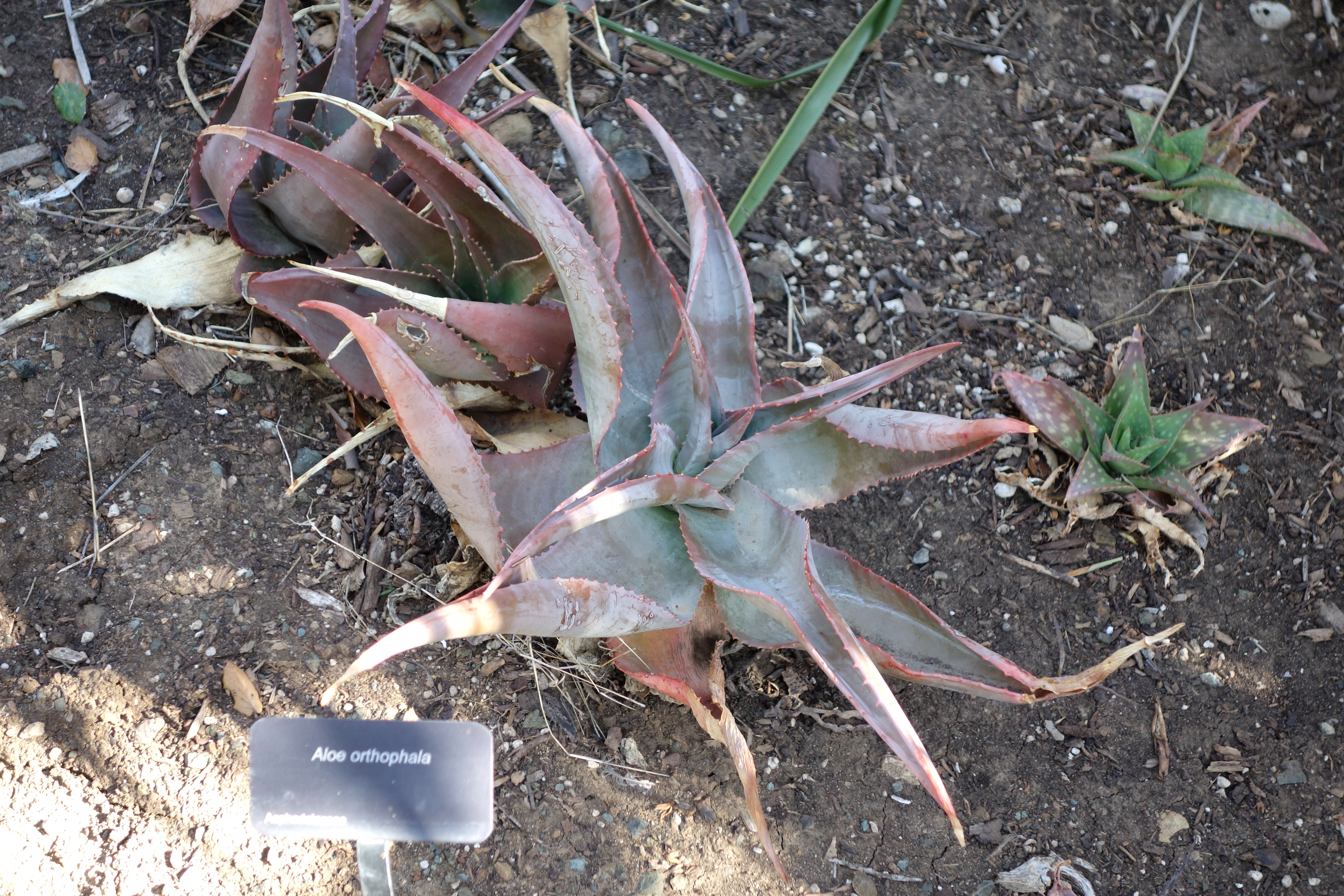

Conservation status
- CITES Appendix II (CITES)

Scientific classification
- Kingdom: Plantae
- Clade: Tracheophytes
- Clade: Angiosperms
- Clade: Monocots
- Order: Asparagales
- Family: Asphodelaceae
- Subfamily: Asphodeloideae
- Genus: Aloe
- Species: A. ortholopha

Binomial name
- Aloe ortholopha Christian & Milne-Red.

= Aloe ortholopha =

Species of succulent

Aloe ortholopha is an aloe native to open grassland at 1450–1525 meters altitude in the northern Great Dyke, Mvurwi Range, Zimbabwe.
