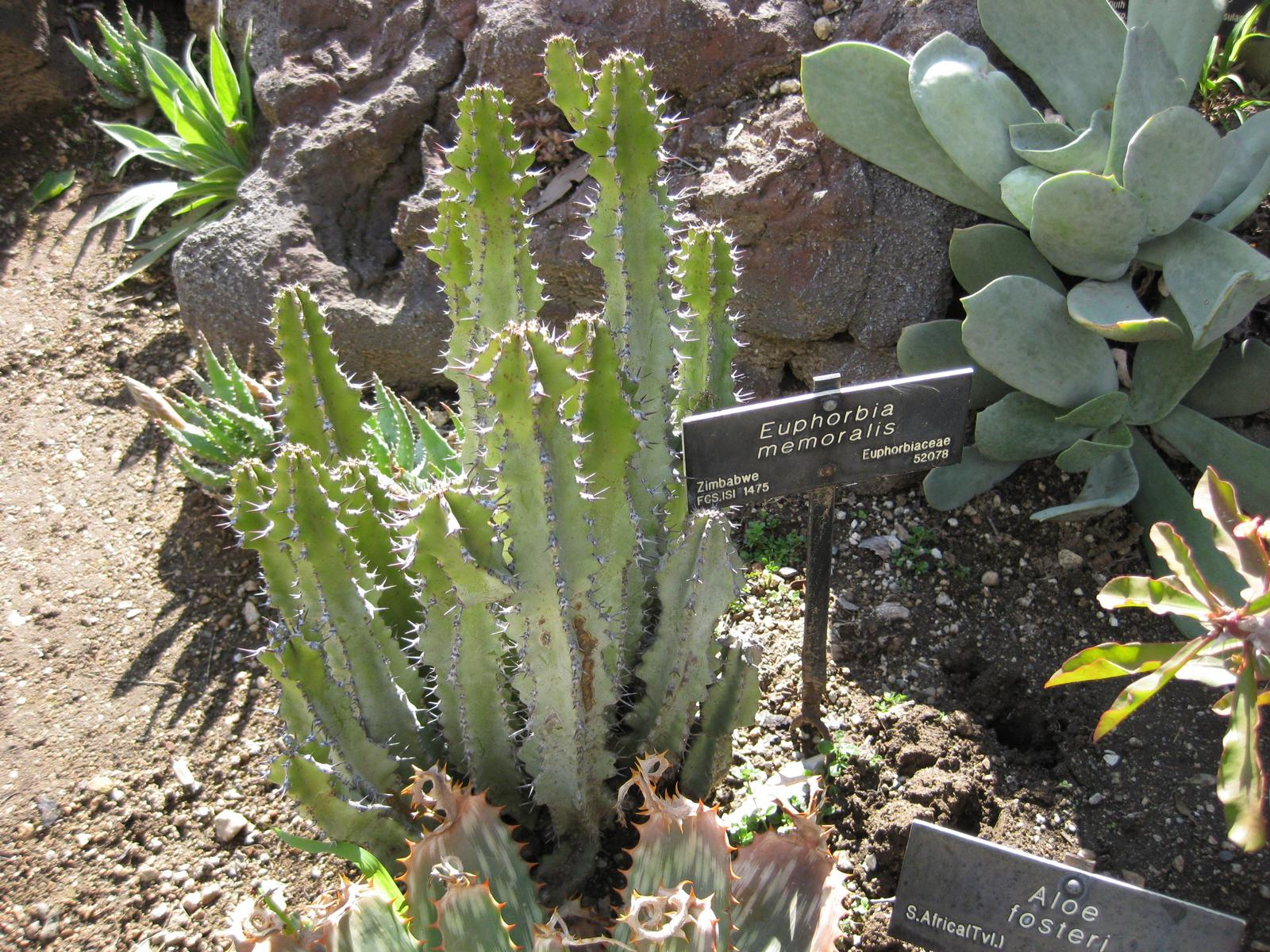
- Habit is cactus-like
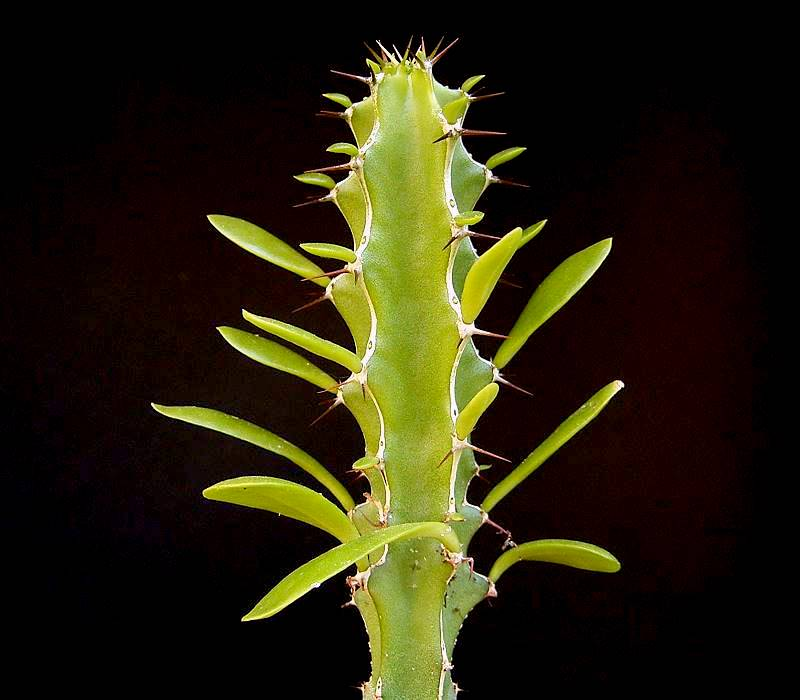
- Close-up of structures

Scientific classification
- Kingdom: Plantae
- Clade: Tracheophytes
- Clade: Angiosperms
- Clade: Eudicots
- Clade: Rosids
- Order: Malpighiales
- Family: Euphorbiaceae
- Genus: Euphorbia
- Species: E. memoralis

Binomial name
- Euphorbia memoralis R.A.Dyer

= Euphorbia memoralis =

Species of plant

Euphorbia memoralis is a species of flowering plant in the family Euphorbiaceae, native to the Great Dyke of Zimbabwe. It is endemic to ultramafic soils.
