= Lion's Den, Zimbabwe =

Lion's Den
- Location within Zimbabwe
- Coordinates: 17°16′12″S 30°01′30″E
- Country: Zimbabwe
- Province: Mashonaland West
- District: Makonde District
- City: Lion's Den Municipality
- Elevation: 1,151 m (3,776 ft)

Population (2011 Estimate)
  - Total: Less than 1,000
- Time zone: UTC+2 (CAT)
- Climate: Cwa

Lion's Den is a small town in Zimbabwe.

== Location ==
The town lies in Makonde District, Mashonaland West Province, in central northern Zimbabwe. It is located about 25 kilometres (16 mi), northwest of Chinhoyi, the nearest large town, and the location of the district and provincial headquarters. This location is approximately 150 kilometres (93 mi), by road, northwest of Harare, the capital of Zimbabwe, and the largest city in that country. Lion's Den sits on Highway A-1, the main road from Harare to Chirundu, at the International border with Zambia, about 230 kilometres (140 mi), further northwest from Lion's Den. The coordinates of the town are: Latitude:-17.2700; Longitude:30.0250 (17° 16' 12.00"S, 30° 1' 30.00"E). The town sits at an altitude of 3,776 feet (1,151 m), above sea level.

== Overview ==
Lion's Den is a small farming town. Crops raised in the surrounding countryside include cotton, maize and tobacco. In addition, cattle are raised on a commercial basis for milk and beef.

== Population ==
The current population of Lion's Den is not publicly known. In 2011, the population in the town was estimated at less than 1,000 people. The next national population census in Zimbabwe is scheduled from 18 August 2012 through 28 August 2012.

== See also ==
- Districts of Zimbabwe
- Provinces of Zimbabwe
- Economy of Zimbabwe
