= Euclase =

Nesosilicate mineral

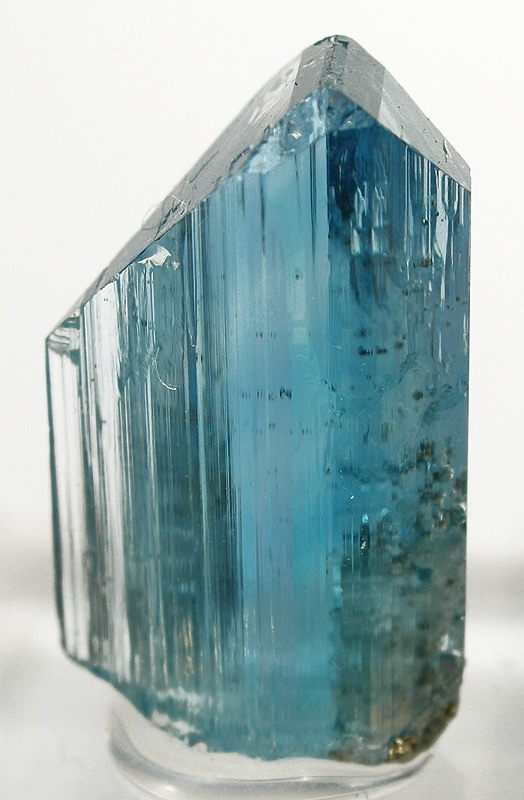

General
- Category: Nesosilicate
- Formula: BeAlSiO_{4}(OH)
- IMA symbol: Ecs
- Strunz classification: 9.AE.10
- Crystal system: Monoclinic
- Crystal class: Prismatic (2/m) (same H-M symbol)
- Space group: P2_{1}/a
- Unit cell: a = 4.763, b = 14.29 c = 4.618 [Å]; β = 100.25°; Z = 4

Identification
- Color: Colorless, white, pale green to deep yellowish green, greenish blue, pale blue to deep blue, and light red
- Crystal habit: Prismatic crystals
- Cleavage: Perfect, perfect on {010}, imperfect on {110} {001}
- Fracture: Conchoidal
- Tenacity: Brittle
- Mohs scale hardness: 7.5
- Luster: Vitreous
- Streak: White
- Diaphaneity: Transparent, translucent
- Specific gravity: 2.99 - 3.1
- Optical properties: Biaxial (+)
- Refractive index: n_{α} = 1.652 n_{β} = 1.655 n_{γ} = 1.671
- Birefringence: δ = 0.019
- Pleochroism: May be marked in shades of deep blue
- 2V angle: 50°
- Dispersion: r > v

Euclase is a beryllium aluminium hydroxide silicate mineral (BeAlSiO_{4}(OH)). It crystallizes in the monoclinic crystal system and is typically massive to fibrous as well as in slender prismatic crystals. It is related to beryl (Be_{3}Al_{2}Si_{6}O_{18}) and other beryllium minerals. It is a product of the decomposition of beryl in pegmatites. Euclase occurs mostly in association with minerals like: quartz, muscovite, fluorite, albite, rutile, schorl and calcite.

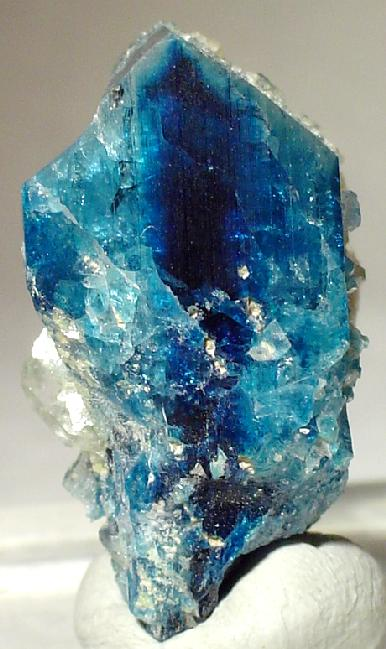
Euclase, 3.0 x 1.6 x 1.6 cm. Lost Hope Mine, Mwami, Mashonaland West Province, Zimbabwe

Euclase crystals are noted for their blue color, ranging from very pale to dark blue. The mineral may also be colorless, white, or light green. Cleavage is perfect, parallel to the clinopinacoid, and this suggested to René Just Haüy the name euclase, from the Greek εὖ, easily, and κλάσις, fracture. The ready cleavage renders the crystals fragile with a tendency to chip, and thus detracts from its use for personal ornament. When cut, it resembles certain kinds of beryl and topaz, from which it may be distinguished by its specific gravity (3.1). Its hardness (7.5) is similar to beryl (7.5 - 8), and a bit less than that of topaz (8). It was first reported in 1792 from the Orenburg district in the southern Urals, Russia, where it is found with topaz and chrysoberyl in the gold-bearing gravels of the Sanarka (nowadays probably, Sakmara River, Mednogorsk district, Orenburgskaya Oblast'). Its type locality is Ouro Prêto, Minas Gerais, Southeast Region, Brazil, where it occurs with topaz. It is found rarely in the mica-schist of the Rauris in the Austrian Alps.
