= Chinhoyi Caves =

Group of caves in north central Zimbabwe

Chinhoyi Caves Recreational Park
- IUCN category II (national park)
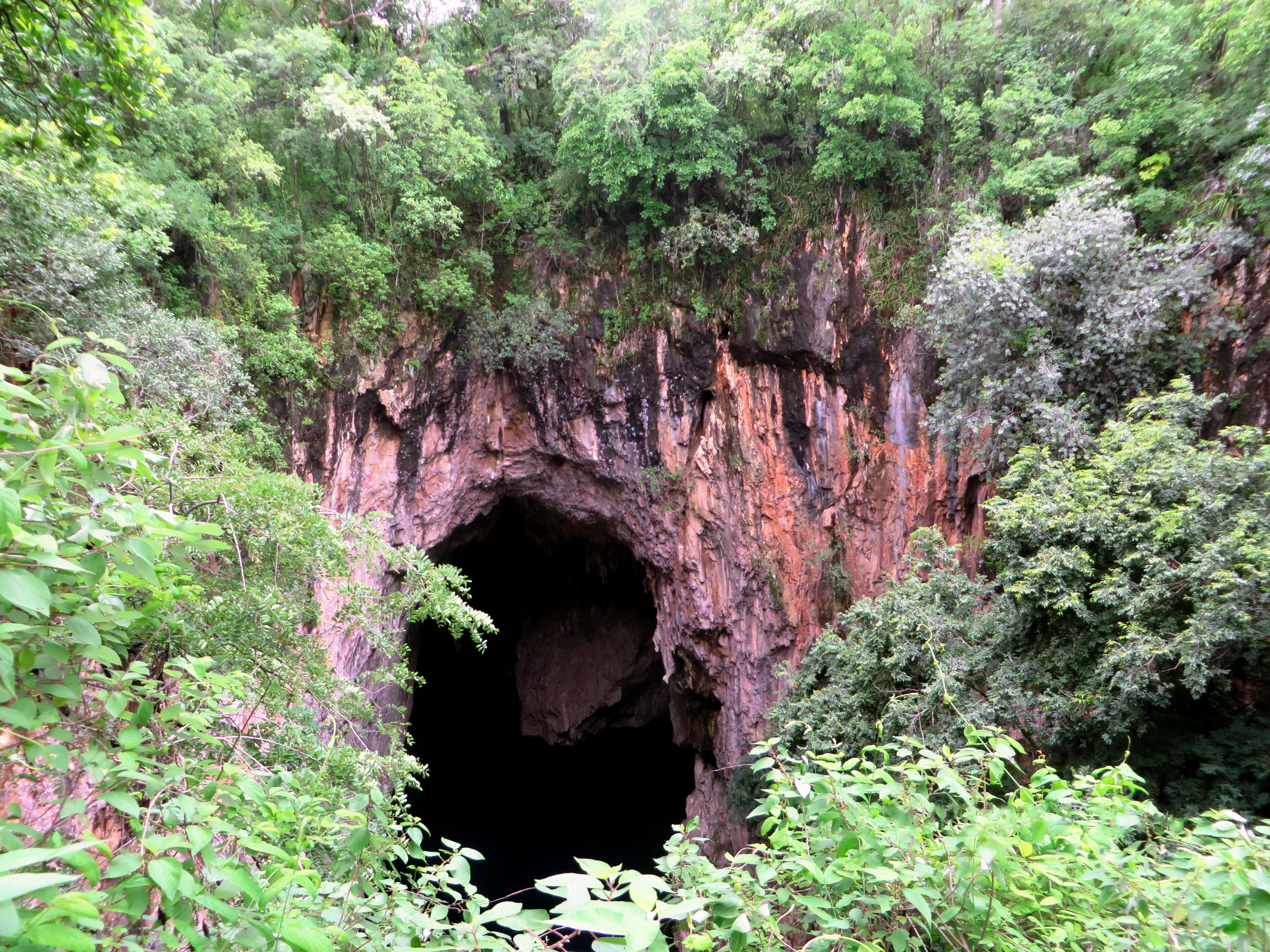
- Interactive map of Chinhoyi Caves Recreational Park
- Location: Chinhoyi District, Zimbabwe
- Nearest city: Chinhoyi
- Coordinates: 17°21′0″S 30°07′30″E
- Governing body: Zimbabwe Parks and Wildlife Management Authority

Ramsar Wetland
- Official name: Chinhoyi Caves Recreational Park
- Designated: 3 May 2013
- Reference no.: 2103

The Chinhoyi Caves (previously the Sinoia Caves) are a group of limestone and dolomite caves in north central Zimbabwe. Designated a National Park in 1955, and managed by the Zimbabwe Parks & Wildlife Management Authority.

== Location ==
The caves are located in Makonde District, Mashonaland West Province, in north central Zimbabwe. They lie approximately 9 kilometres (5.6 mi), by road, northwest of Chinhoyi (formerly Sinoia), the nearest large town, and the location of the district and provincial headquarters. This location lies about 135 kilometres (84 mi), northwest of Harare, the capital. The caves lie on the main road, Highway A-1, between Harare and Chirundu, at the International border with the Republic of Zambia, about 250 kilometres (160 mi), further northwest of the caves.

== Overview ==
The cave system is composed of limestone and dolomite. The main cave contains a pool of cobalt blue water, which is popularly called Sleeping Pool or Chirorodziva ("Pool of the Fallen"). Divers have discovered a submarine passage leading from the Bat Cave, a subchamber of the Dark Cave to another room known as the Blind Cave. Diving is possible in the caves all year round, with temperatures never beyond the 22 to 24 °C (72 to 75 °F) range with zero thermocline. Visibility is high, and 50 metres (160 ft) and above is not unusual. This site is often visited by diving expedition teams of technical divers that perform ultra deep diving. It is not uncommon for dives in excess of 100 metres (330 ft) to be made here by experienced technical divers. A campsite, run by the National Parks Authority, and a motel are located on-site.

== History ==
The local name for the cave's pool, Chirorodziva ("Pool of the Fallen") comes from an incident that occurred in 1830, where members of the Angonni tribe attacked the local people and threw their victims into the cave to dispose of them.

The limestone caves were first described by Frederick Courtney Selous in 1888. These caves are the most extensive cave system in Zimbabwe that the public can access.

== Religion ==
The caves have an important place in African Traditional Religion, with the caves themselves as a site for rainmaking, surrounded by a sacred forest, from which trees could not be felled.

== See also ==
- Districts of Zimbabwe
- Provinces of Zimbabwe
- Economy of Zimbabwe
