= Chinhoyi High School =

School in Mashonaland West Province, Zimbabwe

Coordinates: 17.3554°S 30.1765°E

Chinhoyi High School (formerly Sinoia High School) is a Government high school located in Chinhoyi, Mashonaland West province, Zimbabwe. The school was established in 1960. The school is located 2 km north of Chinhoyi town centre on the A1 road to Karoi and Kariba. The school is about 122 km north-west of Harare.

It is co-educational, with approximately 1000 students in 6 forms: Form one, Form two, Form three, Form four, Lower sixth, and Upper sixth. About 600 of the students are boarders with the remaining 400 being day students.

There are six boarding hostels each called after a British Royal house. The three girls' boarding houses are called Tudor, Windsor and Angevin. The three boys houses are called Stuart, Norman and Hanover. For inter-house sports, day scholars (non-boarders) compete for Dendera and Rukodzi). The motto of the school is Pietas which means "service to the community".

== Notable alumni ==
- Rozalla Miller, singer

== See also ==
- List of schools in Zimbabwe
- List of boarding schools
