= Baptist Convention of Zimbabwe =

- Abbreviation: BCZ
- Classification: Evangelical Christianity
- Theology: Baptist
- President: Rev Z Chigumbu
- Treasurer: Mr ChakauyaTreasurer
- Associations: All Africa Baptist Fellowship, Baptist World Alliance, Evangelical Fellowship of Zimbabwe
- Headquarters: Gweru, Zimbabwe
- Possessions: Baptist Conference Centre
- Origin: 1963
- Congregations: 500
- Members: 300,100
- Hospitals: Sanyati Baptist Hospital
- Nursing homes: Sasame Clinic
- Primary schools: Zororo Baptist Primary, Sanyati Primary
- Secondary schools: Sanyati High
- Tertiary institutions: Baptist Theological Serminary of Zimbabwe
- Slogan: Baptist people who care

The Baptist Convention of Zimbabwe is a Baptist Christian denomination in Zimbabwe. It is affiliated with the Baptist World Alliance and the Evangelical Fellowship of Zimbabwe. The headquarters is in Gweru.

== History ==
The Baptist Convention of Zimbabwe has its origins in an American mission of the International Mission Board in 1950. This was at a time when the FMB had decided to start denominational work in Southern Rhodesia (modern day Zimbabwe). The IMB appointed Clyde Dotson and his wife Hattie Dotson who were already serving in the country as independent missionaries to be the first missionary representatives of the IMB in Southern Rhodesia. In 1951 during an SBC annual conference Dotson urged the FMB to send more missionaries and resources to support missions work towards blacks in Rhodesia. He mentioned there were only 4 Baptist churches mainly targeting whites.

Church work started in Rimuka Township and Ngezi Township respectively. In 1952 a school was opened at Sanyati where Dotson had negotiated for land from the Rhodesian Government following a resettlement that had happened. A baptismal pool was dug from the ground and was plastered with cement and this is where Rev Dotson baptized the converts. The FMB sent another missionary couple Ralph and Betty Bawlin who served at the primary school and Dotson began traveling to and from cities across Zimbabwe starting churches. He was assisted by Rev J Nyathi, a teacher who had gone to South Africa for theological training and teacher Ndebele who served in Kadoma. The first churches to be built were Sakubva Baptist Church (Mutare), Harare Baptist Church (Harare), Monomotapa Baptist Church (Gweru) and Sanyati Baptist Church (Sanyati) which was built in 1956.

Villagers kept on asking for medicine from Mrs Dotson and they decided to set up a clinic at Sanyati Mission station. Other clinics were started in the Gokwe area and these include the clinics at Ganyungu, Mutange, Chinyenyetu, Manyoni, Sasame, Masakadza, Chireya, Denda, Goredema and Nenyunga. The Dotson's opened a clinic that they staffed themselves. The Sanyati Baptist Hospital was officially opened in 1953 by Drs. Giles and Wana Ann Fort the first physicians, three nurses(Monda Maria, Betty Bowlin, Margaret from Mhondoro, a nurses aid Janie Christmas and her spouse Father Christmas(painter), and a lab tech Dorothy Katz. The Rhodesian Mission Board of the Southern Baptist Convention was then established in the following years.

The growth of the Baptist work in Zimbabwe stimulated a number of many young black Rhodesians and they felt called to serve the Lord as pastors and evangelists. It became a custom that on yearly basis two pastors would attend an annual meeting of the FMB as delegates. Many of these pastors and evangelists started wanting to get involved in the governance of the church. In 1961 African pastors started asking for a full delegation status and the right to attend all meeting sessions. This led to tensions between missionaries and the African pastors. The rising tensions gave birth to a Baptist Convention in 1963. The Baptist Convention of Zimbabwe was then officially founded in 1963 and the first President was Rev Abel Nziramasanga. According to a census published by the association in 2023, it claimed 500 churches and 300,100 members.

== Organisation ==
Local member churches form the Baptist Convention of Zimbabwe, but these local churches can also be classified into different associations and different associations form regions.

== Affiliate groups ==
There are different affiliate groups within the convention and these promote missions growth and evangelism as well as targeting the special needs of each group . These include

- Baptist Men's Fellowship - BMF
- Women's Missionary Union - WMU
- Baptist Haven of Hope - a group for Single parents
- Baptist Youth Student Department - BYSD
- Baptist Young Men's Fellowship - BMF
- Young Women Association - WMU
- Girls Auxiliary - GA, WMU
- Royal Ambassadors- RA, BMF
- Little Helpers - WMU

== Governance ==
The Baptist Convention of Zimbabwe is governed by an executive committee composed of eleven members. The executive committee is responsible for directing the affairs and business of the convention.
