= Mhondoro–Ngezi District =

Mhondoro-Ngezi District
- Second-level administrative subdivision
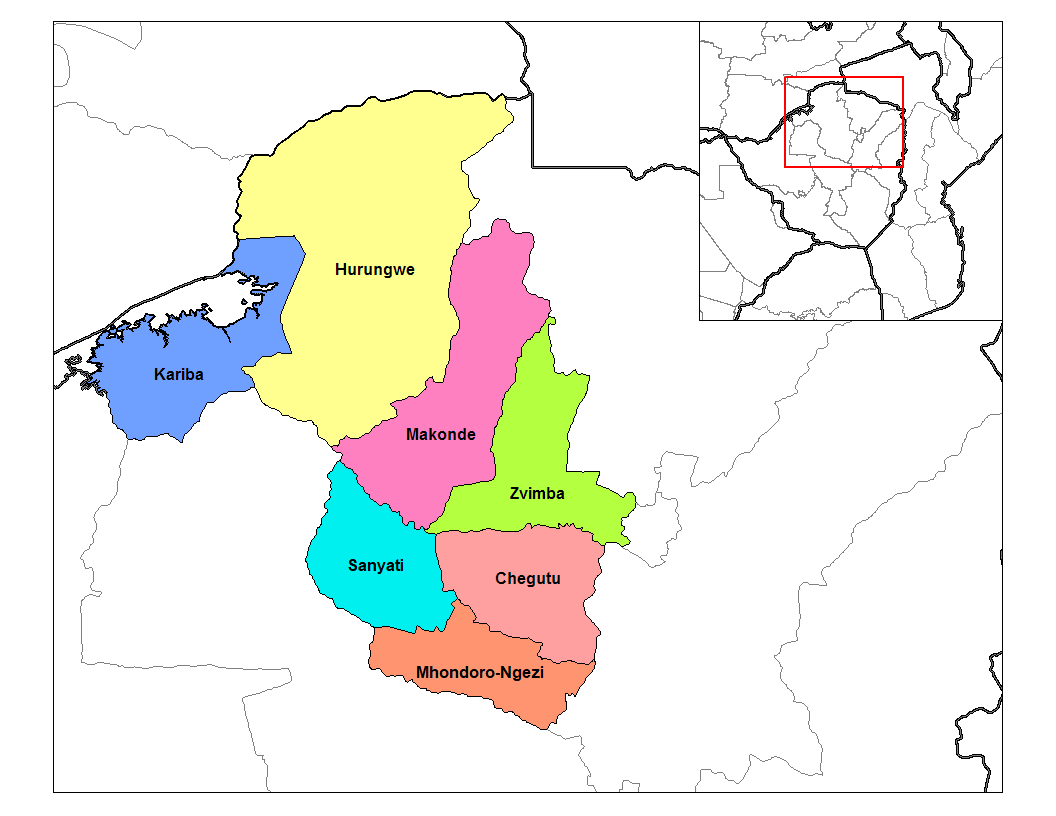
- Country: Zimbabwe
- Province: Mashonaland West

Area
  - Total: 4,295 km^{2} (1,658 sq mi)

Population (2022 census)
  - Total: 140,994
  - Density: 32.83/km^{2} (85.02/sq mi)
- Time zone: UTC+1 (CET)
  - Summer (DST): UTC+1 (CEST)

Mhondoro-Ngezi District is a district of the Province Mashonaland West in Zimbabwe. The district was created 2007 by splitting Kadoma District in Mhondoro–Ngezi District and Sanyati District. It has a population of 140,994 inhabitants (2022 census).
