= Makwiro =

Human settlement in Zimbabwe

Coordinates: 17°58′S 30°26′E

Makwiro is a settlement in Mashonaland West province in Zimbabwe.
