= Karoi District =

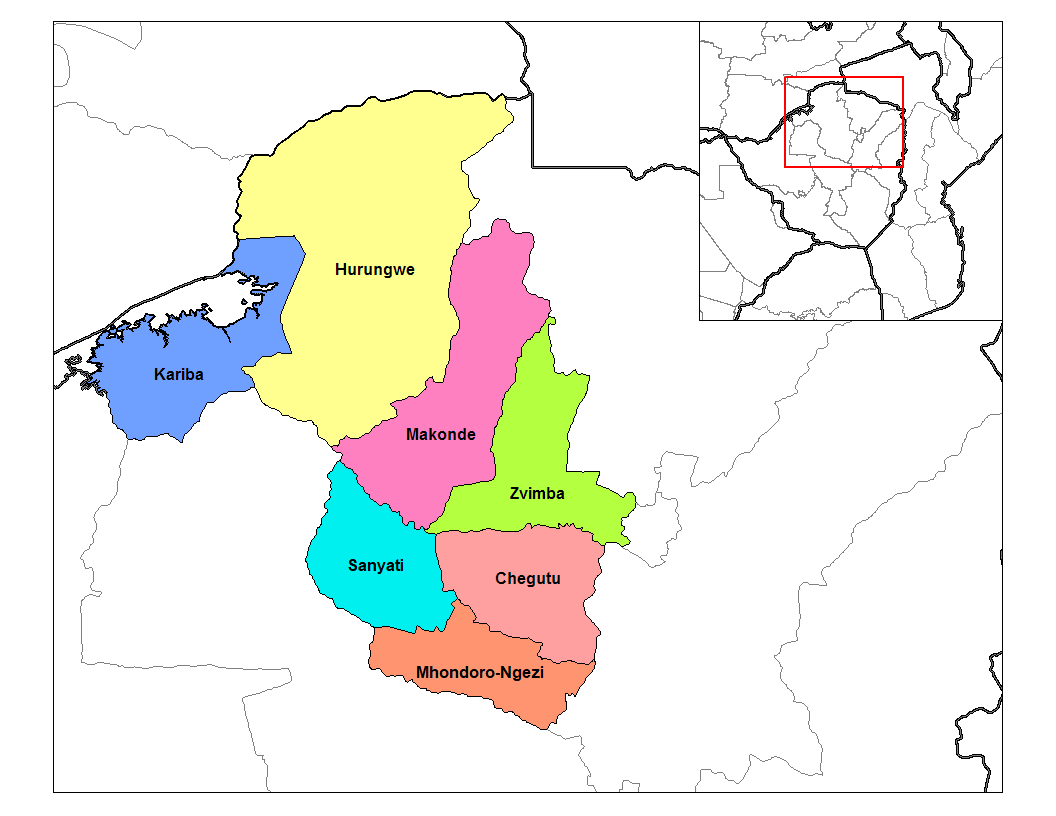
- Karoi District (yellow) in Mashonaland West Province
- Coordinates: 17°00′S 30°00′E
- Country: Zimbabwe
- Province: Mashonaland West

Area
  - Total: 19,843 km^{2} (7,661 sq mi)

Population (2022 census)
  - Total: 390,897
  - Density: 19.699/km^{2} (51.021/sq mi)

Karoi District is a district of Mashonaland West Province, Zimbabwe. The district is also known as Hurungwe District which extends to Zambian border. The Hurungwe district office are found in Karoi town.

== Location ==
The district is located in Mashonaland West Province, in north central Zimbabwe. Its main town, Karoi, is located about 200 kilometres (120 mi), by road, northwest of Harare, the capital of Zimbabwe and the largest city in that country.

== Overview ==
Karoi District is a farming district. Tobacco followed by Cotton are the main cash crops and are widely grown in the area. Urban centers in the district include Karoi, the district headquarters Magunje a growth point, Tengwe, a farming town southwest of Karoi and Kazangarare a growth point located 60 kilometers northeast of Karoi and hold one of Zimbabwe's granaries known as Mukwichi.

== Population ==
The current population of Hurungwe District is not publicly known. In 1992, the national census put the district population at 246,902. By 2002's national census, that population had increased to 309,821. The next national population census in Zimbabwe is scheduled from 18 August 2012 through 28 August 2012.

== See also ==
- Districts of Zimbabwe
- Provinces of Zimbabwe
