= Makonde District =

District in Zimbabwe

Coordinates: 17°21′S 30°12′E

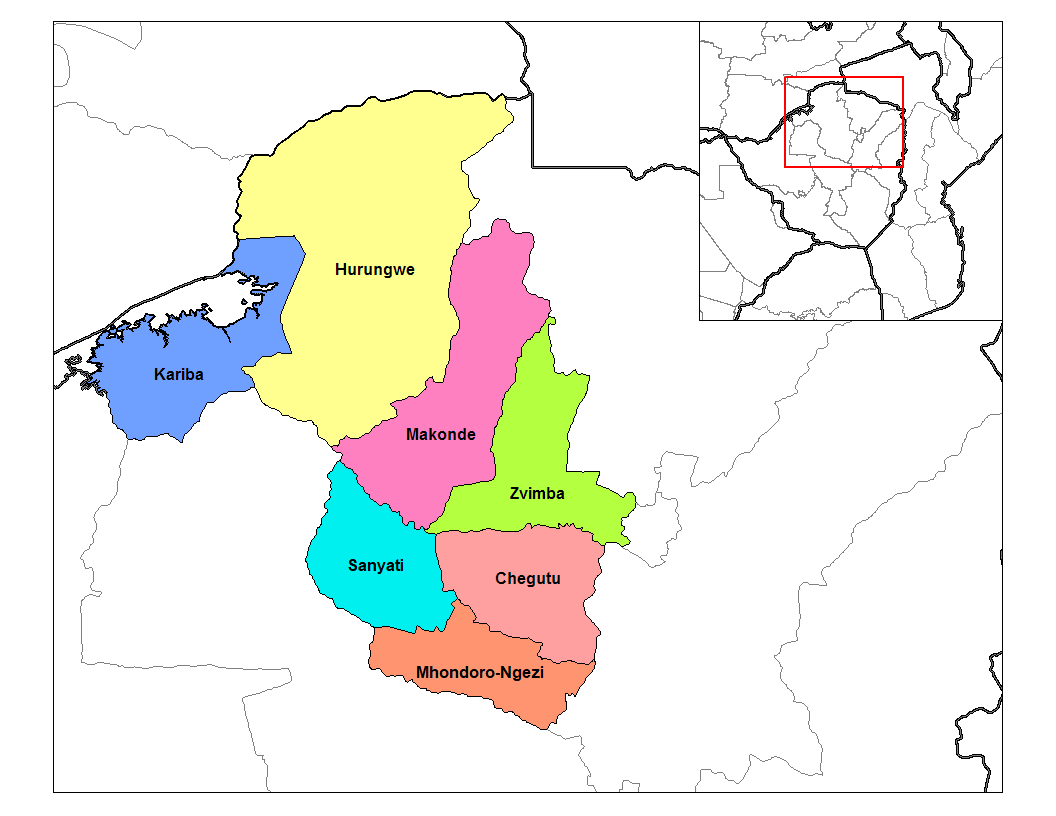
- Makonde District in Mashonaland West Province
- Country: Zimbabwe
- Province: Mashonaland West

Area
  - Total: 8,564 km^{2} (3,307 sq mi)

Population (2022 census)
  - Total: 209,960
  - Density: 24.52/km^{2} (63.50/sq mi)

Makonde District is a district in Zimbabwe.

== Location ==
The district is located in Mashonaland West Province, in north central Zimbabwe. Its main town, Chinhoyi, with an estimated population of 61,739 people in 2004, is located about 125 kilometres (78 mi), by road, northwest of Harare, the capital of Zimbabwe and the largest city in that country.

== Overview ==
Makonde District is a farming district. Crops grown here include cotton, maize and tobacco. Cattle are also raised in the district for dairy products and beef on a commercial basis. Mining of copper also takes place.

Chinhoyi, the district headquarters is a college town, hosting two major universities, namely: Chinhoyi University of Technology (CUT) and Zimbabwe Open University (ZOU). There are three major high schools; Chinhoyi High School, Nemakonde High School and Lomagundi College. In addition the district is home to numerous primary schools. The majority of schools include Hombwe, Kenzamba, Zumbara, Choto Chipfuwamiti, Mapfungwe, St Rupperts, Runene, Mkohwe, Shupa, Matoranhembe, Magurekure.

== Population ==
In 2010, the district population was estimated at 167,436 people. The 2022 census estimated a population of 209,960.

Urban centers in the district include Chinhoyi, the provincial and district headquarters, Alaska approximately 15 kilometres (9.3 mi) directly west of Chinhoyi, and Lion's Den, which lies about 25 kilometres (16 mi), northwest of Chinhoyi, on the road to Chirundu.

== See also ==
- Districts of Zimbabwe
- Provinces of Zimbabwe
