= Tengwe =

Coordinates: 17°18′0″S 29°13′59″E

Tengwe is a rural business centre in Hurungwe District in the province of Mashonaland West, Zimbabwe situated about 70 km north-west of Chinhoyi and approximately 40 km south of Karoi. Tobacco is mainly produced in the area.

It has a police station, clinic and a school. The clinic is called Tengwe Clinic and the school is called Mshowe Primary and High School. In Tengwe there are two big shops which are Farm and City and Rama wholesale, and there is a fuel station.

Tengwe Country Club is in the village. It was built before independence and refurbished in 2019.

In Tengwe there are some churches which include the following Word of Truth Ministries International, ZAOGA (FIF), Salvation Army, Methodist church and AFM.
