= Chegutu District =

Chegutu District Hartley District
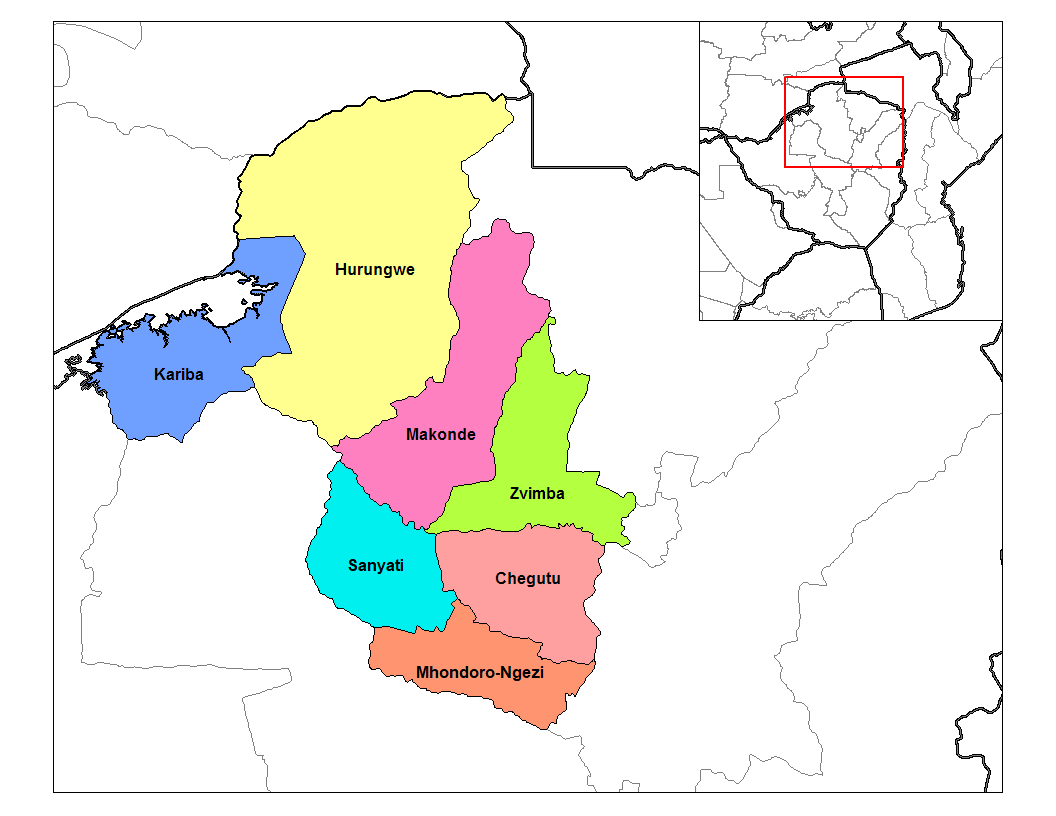
- Chegutu District (light pink) in Mashonaland West Province
- Coordinates: 18°00′S 30°00′E
- Country: Zimbabwe
- Province: Mashonaland West

Chegutu, originally known as Hartley, is a district of Mashonaland West Province, Zimbabwe. The district headquarters is located in Chegutu, a city which lies of the Harare-Bulawayo Road, (Highway A-5).

== Location ==
The district is located in Mashonaland West Province, in central northern Zimbabwe. Chegutu District is bordered by Kadoma District to the south and west, Zvimba District to the north and to the east, lies Mazoe District in Mashonaland Central Province. Its main town, Chegutu, is located about 120 kilometres (75 mi), by road, southwest of Harare, the capital of Zimbabwe and the largest city in that country.

== Economy ==
Chegutu District is primarily a mining district. Large gold deposits are found in the district and the two largest gold mines there are the Butterfly Mine (originally a pre-colonial mining site) and the Giant Mine, both owned by owned by Africa Consolidated Resources (ACR). Other mines include platinum mines such as the Hartley Mine opened in 1987. Artisanal gold mining is also prevalent, often using unsafe methods, such as mercury separation.

== Population ==
The current population of Chegutu District is not publicly known. In 1992, the national census put the district population at 191,909 people. By 2002's national census, that population count had increased to 224,589. The next national population census in Zimbabwe is scheduled from 18 August 2012 through 28 August 2012.

== See also ==
- Districts of Zimbabwe
- Provinces of Zimbabwe
- Geography of Zimbabwe
