= Sanyati District =

- Second-level administrative subdivision
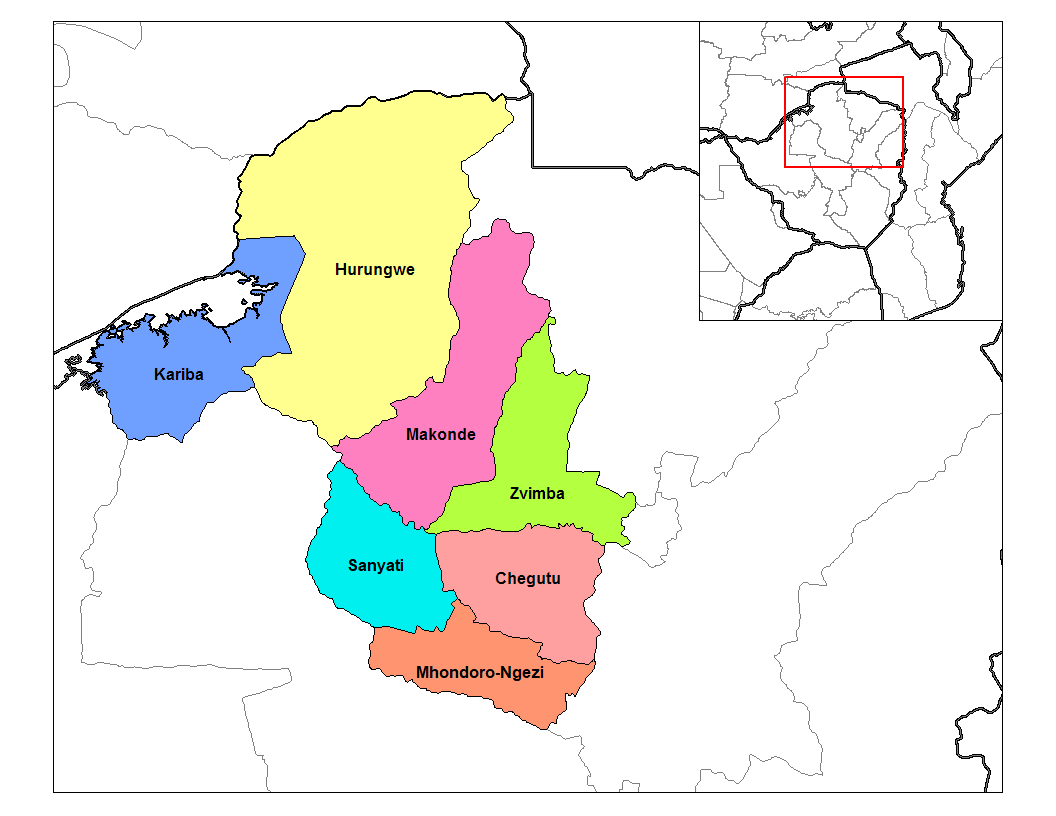
- Country: Zimbabwe
- Province: Mashonaland West

Area
  - Total: 4,833 km^{2} (1,866 sq mi)

Population (2022 census)
  - Total: 139,235
  - Density: 28.81/km^{2} (74.62/sq mi)
- Time zone: UTC+1 (CET)
  - Summer (DST): UTC+1 (CEST)

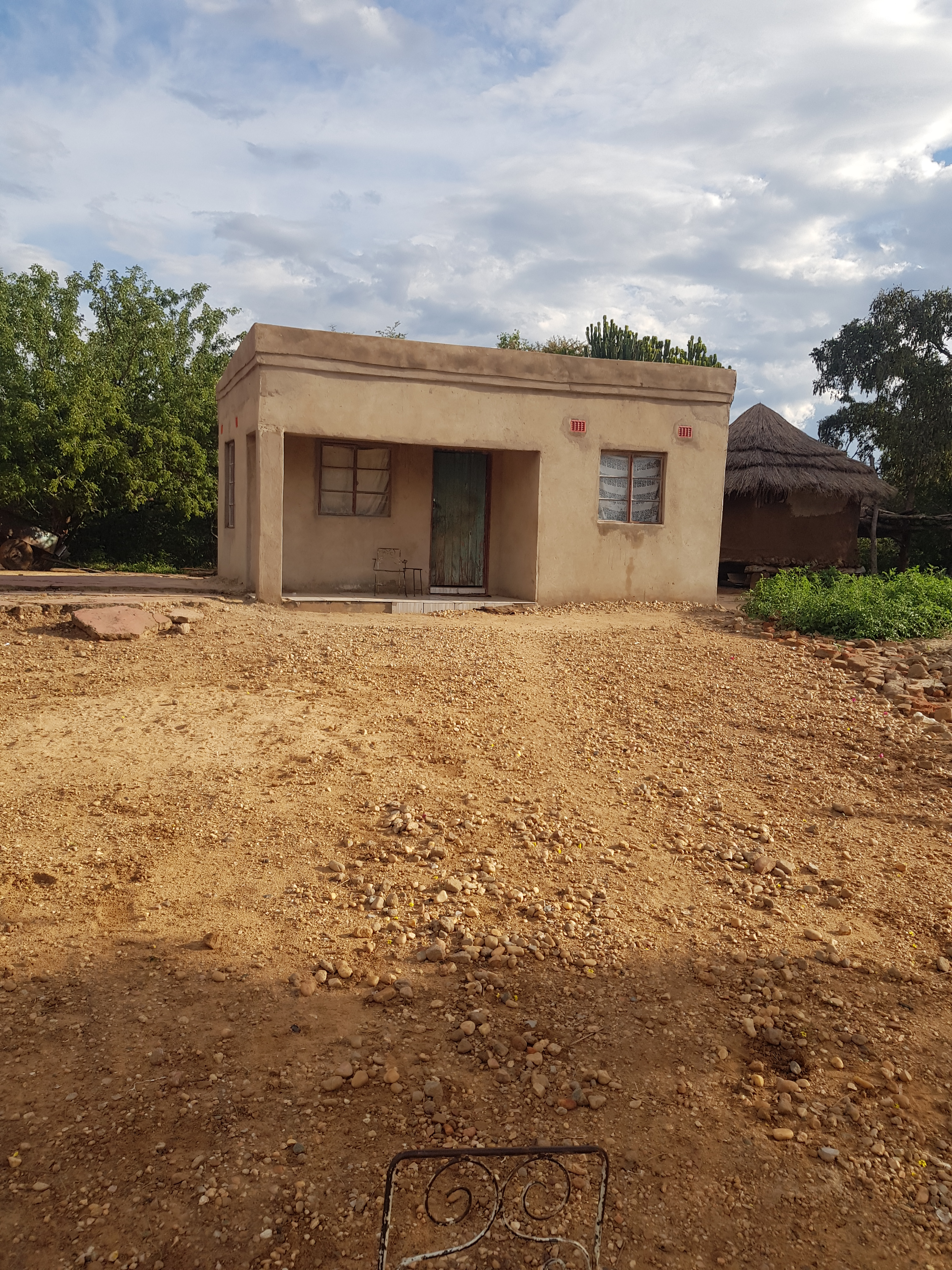
Modern and traditional houses in Sanyati District.

Sanyati District is a district of the Province Mashonaland West in Zimbabwe. The district was created 2007 by splitting Kadoma District in Mhondoro–Ngezi District and Sanyati District.

== See also ==
Sanyati
