= Eiffel Flats =

Village in Zimbabwe

Coordinates: 18°19′S 29°59′E

Eiffel Flats is a village in the province of Mashonaland West, Zimbabwe. It is located about 7 km east of Kadoma.

== History ==
The village began in 1905 as a residential township for the Cam and Motor gold mine, operated by Rio Tinto Group, now Rio Zim. The original mines are now closed. Wiridzayi Nguruve, who in 1982 became the first Commissioner of the Zimbabwe Republic Police, was the member in charge of the Eiffel Flats Police Station and served as a Sub Inspector, in the mid-1970s.

== Economy ==
Eiffel Flats economy is based around mining and metals, with Cam and Motor, historically the largest gold mine in Zimbabwe. This mine was closed in 1969, but it is planned to reopen.

There are two smelters: Empress, which is a nickel toll refinery, and Maranatha ferrochrome, which produces chrome.

== Education ==
Eiffel Flats Primary School was established in 1917 by the Rio Tinto Foundation and its first Headmaster was Mr Loveridge. It was later handed over to the community in the early 1990s when Rio Tinto was disinvesting from Zimbabwe. A parents body represented by an elected Board of Governors runs the school at the moment. The current headmaster who is Gift Bere, who took over from Mr Campher. It was rated as one of the best ATS primary schools along with Bryden, Lilfordia and Barwick. In 2012, the school won the Environmental Education Association of Southern Africa Presidential Award for its environmental campaigns.

== Recreation ==
The Cam and Motor Club incorporates a golf course, the Cam and Motor Squash, Bowls, and Tennis clubs, along with a sports bar and family restaurant.
