= Clyde Dotson =

Zimbabwean missionary (1905–1982)

Clyde J. Dotson (July 29, 1905 – September 30, 1982) was a Zimbabwean Baptist missionary led the formation of the Rhodesian Mission Board and the Baptist Convention of Zimbabwe. Dotson died in 1982 and was buried in Alabama.

== Career ==
Dotson served as pastor of Town Creek Baptist Church in Town Creek Alabama Leighton Baptist Church and Courtland Baptist Church before his service in Africa.

=== Rusitu Mission (1930-1950) ===
Dotson was commissioned in 1930, when he was assigned by the South Africa Mission Board to join other missionaries serving at Rusitu Mission in Chimanimani District. Shortly after he arrived, he was appointed to be the leader of the mission station. He served for 20 years but in 1949 he had a disagreement with the other missionaries and he left Rusitu Mission, becoming an independent missionary with his wife.

=== Southern Baptist Convention (1950-1972) ===
After working for a short time as an independent missionary, the Dotsons were appointed by the Foreign Mission Board (FMB) now International Mission Board (IMB) of the Southern Baptist Convention (SBC) in 1950. The FMB was planning its first denominational work in Rhodesia and the Dotsons were the first missionaries appointed by the FMB in Rhodesia. In the 1951 SBC Annual Congress, Dotson encouraged the SBC to send more missionaries and resources to reach out to the blacks in Southern Rhodesia. At this time there were only four Baptist churches which allowed white people only. Dotson led the establishment of Sanyati Mission, many clinics which include Sasame, Chinyenyetu, Manyoni, Chireya and Chinyenyetu, the Baptist Theological Seminary of Zimbabwe and the Baptist Convention of Zimbabwe. He left Zimbabwe in 1972 because of his deteriorating health and returned to America.

== Personal life ==
Dotson was born in Alabama. He married three times and was widowed twice. His first wife Hattie Thigpen was killed in a motorcycle accident in Harare on March 26, 1955. They had seven children, John, Margaret, Ruth, Betty, Grace, Joy and Lolete. Lolete went on to become a missionary nurse in Nigeria, and Grace went on to write a book about her family’s experience in Rhodesia.

Dotson then married Ebbie Kilgo who died during child birth in January 1958. Dotson was living in Mutare at this time and on this day he spent the night praying on one of Mutare town hills. In the morning, he told people that he had been shown Calvary by God.

In 1958, he met his third wife Anneli Valtonen, a native of Finland who had moved to South Africa to serve as a missionary. They married in 1960 before moving to serve in Zimbabwe. Anneli worked as a registered nurse and midwife. She felt called to missionary work at the age of ten. She died on October 4, 2021.

== Legacy ==
Dotson pioneered the work of Southern Baptist Convention in Zimbabwe resulting in the formation of the Baptist Convention of Zimbabwe. Through his efforts Sanyati Baptist Hospital was built as well as a number of clinics in Gokwe. There is a hall at Baptist Conference Centre named after him and his helper J Nyathi, The Dotson Nyathi Hall.

== Publications ==
- The Power of God in My Life
