= Lalapanzi =

Human settlement in Zimbabwe

Coordinates: 19°20′S 30°11′E

Lalapanzi is a town in Midlands province in Zimbabwe. It straddles the Great Dyke, a mineral-rich geological formation that runs north-south down the center of the country. The name is also applied to the areas surrounding the town.

Chromium mining is common around Lalapanzi, but has not led to major benefits for the locals. Two of the largest mines are operated by Lonrho (London Rhodesia Company), which has since given up its stake, and Zimasco (Zimbabwe Alloy and Steel Company). More recently, (starting in the 1990s) smaller, independent miners have accounted for larger volumes of the ore to leave the area. This has led to environmental problems as they are largely unregulated.

The town has one post office, one very large police station, three clinics (two private, one state-run), one railway station, two primary and one secondary school. The railway station in Lalapanzi includes a intermodal loading hub.

It has also been used as a dormitory town for the Sino-Zimbabwe cement company about 20 km (12 mi) west. However, since the commodity price collapse of the 1990s it has largely become a ghost town.
