= Selous, Zimbabwe =

Coordinates: 18°05′S 30°27′E

Selous is a village in Chegutu District in Zimbabwe. It lies not far from Harare on the main Harare to Bulawayo road. It is named after the British explorer and hunter Frederick Selous.

It is a centre of platinum and chrome mining and processing.
