= Kadoma, Zimbabwe =

Kadoma
- City
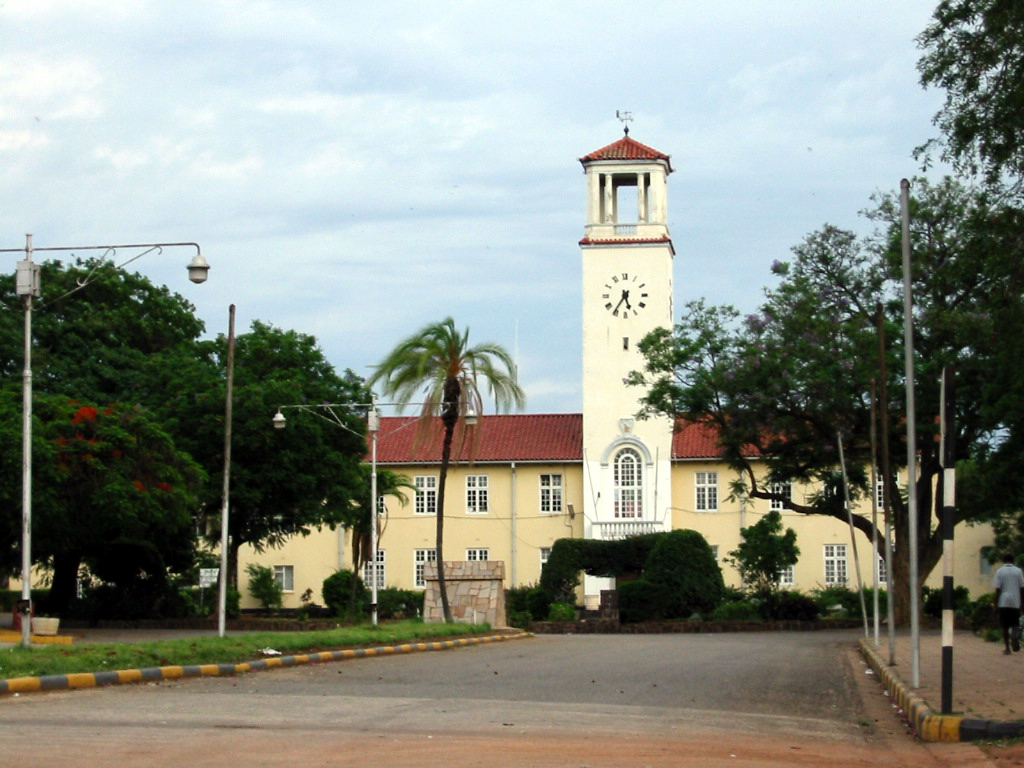
- Kadoma Townhall

- Coat of arms

- Location within Zimbabwe
- Coordinates: 18°20′24″S 29°54′00″E
- Country: Zimbabwe
- Province: Mashonaland West
- District: Kadoma
- City: Kadoma Municipality
- Founded: 1890s

Government
  - Mayor: C. Chikozho
- Elevation: 1,183 m (3,881 ft)

Population (2022 Census)
  - Total: 116,300
- Time zone: UTC+2 (CAT)
- Climate: Cwa
- Website: http://kadomacity.org.zw/

Kadoma, formerly known as Gatooma, is a city in Zimbabwe.

== Overview ==
The city is at the centre of a mining area, which provides gold, copper, and nickel. The most significant mine of the region is the Cam and Motor Mine, which is located in Eiffel Flats, about 10 kilometres (6.2 mi), by road, northeast of Kadoma. Cam and Motor is the largest gold producer in Zimbabwe's history, and is owned by Rio Tinto Zimbabwe.

Cotton is grown in the area and there was some development of related industries before 1990. The David Whithead Textile manufacturing company was opened in 1952.

ZB Bank Limited, a commercial bank, maintains a branch in the city. Kadoma is also a peaceful town.

== Geography ==
=== Location ===
The city is located in Kadoma District, Mashonaland West Province, one of the 10 administrative provinces in Zimbabwe. This location lies approximately 141 kilometres (88 mi), by road, southwest of Harare, the national capital and largest city in the country. The city lies on Highway A-5, between Harare and Bulawayo, approximately 300 kilometres (190 mi) northeast of Bulawayo. Kadoma is situated at an elevation of 3,881 feet (1,183 m) above sea level.

=== Climate ===
Climate data for Kadoma (1961–1990)
Month	Jan	Feb	Mar	Apr	May	Jun	Jul	Aug	Sep	Oct	Nov	Dec	Year
Mean daily maximum °C (°F)	28.6 (83.5)	28.3 (82.9)	28.6 (83.5)	28.0 (82.4)	26.1 (79.0)	23.9 (75.0)	23.9 (75.0)	26.7 (80.1)	30.3 (86.5)	32.0 (89.6)	30.3 (86.5)	28.7 (83.7)	28.0 (82.4)
Mean daily minimum °C (°F)	17.7 (63.9)	17.4 (63.3)	16.2 (61.2)	14.6 (58.3)	11.4 (52.5)	8.8 (47.8)	8.5 (47.3)	10.4 (50.7)	13.8 (56.8)	16.8 (62.2)	17.6 (63.7)	17.8 (64.0)	14.3 (57.7)
Average rainfall mm (inches)	183.2 (7.21)	146.8 (5.78)	77.8 (3.06)	29.9 (1.18)	5.7 (0.22)	1.6 (0.06)	0.5 (0.02)	1.3 (0.05)	3.4 (0.13)	33.2 (1.31)	90.2 (3.55)	165.0 (6.50)	738.6 (29.08)
Average rainy days	14	12	7	3	1	0	0	0	1	4	9	13	64
Source: World Meteorological Organization

== History ==
The city of Kadoma was known as Gatooma until after independence, on 18 April 1982, when new names for 32 places were gazetted. Gatooma was founded in the 1890s as a mining camp, and constituted under a village management board in 1907. The settlement was named after the nearby kraal of Chief Katuma, who is represented on the town's coat of arms by the mountain bearing his name and the chief's badge of office.

The Specks Hotel was opened in 1907, and Jameson High School started the same year when Amelia Fitt, wife of the first mayor of Kadoma, started to give classes to the town children in her house.

In 1917 Gatooma Municipality was created.

A public electricity supply was introduced in Kadoma in 1922.

The Grand Hotel opened in 1925 and had a sprung floor for dancing, the first such floor in Zimbabwe.

In the 1970s Gatooma held highland games which was attended by the Salisbury Caledonian Society Pipe Band, Churchill School Pipe Band from Salisbury and the Northlea School Pipe Band from Bulawayo.

=== Rio Tinto FC ===
The compound in which the workers lived in the 1960s and 70s was known as "Rio Tinto", and Rio Tinto Football Club was a strong team. Zimbabwe international player John Phiri, who also played in Europe, played for Rio Tinto as well as the State House Tornadoes and Darryn Textiles teams. The club continued into the 1990s.

Coaches included John Rugg and Peter Phiri, (c.1938 – 23 March 2023). and other players at the club included Joseph Zulu and Gibson Sibanda (both later politicians), Ephert Lungu, Robert Godoka, Wonder Phiri, Stanley Nyika, goalkeeper Raphael Phiri, David Mwanza, Rainos Maphumo, Charles Chirwa, Byron Manuel, and others.

== Population ==
In 2004, the population of the city was estimated at 79,174. The population of Kadoma was estimated at 77,749 in 2012.

In the 1969 census its population totalled 20,940, of whom 1,879 were white and 18,740 were African.

In 1975 the population was estimated at 33,000, of whom approximately 2700 were white.

== Sister city ==
The city of Kadoma is twinned with Stevenage in the United Kingdom.

City	Country	Year
Stevenage	United Kingdom	1989

== See also ==
- Rio Tinto Group
- Economy of Zimbabwe
