= Kadoma District =

Former district of Zimbabwe

Coordinates: 18°18′S 29°48′E

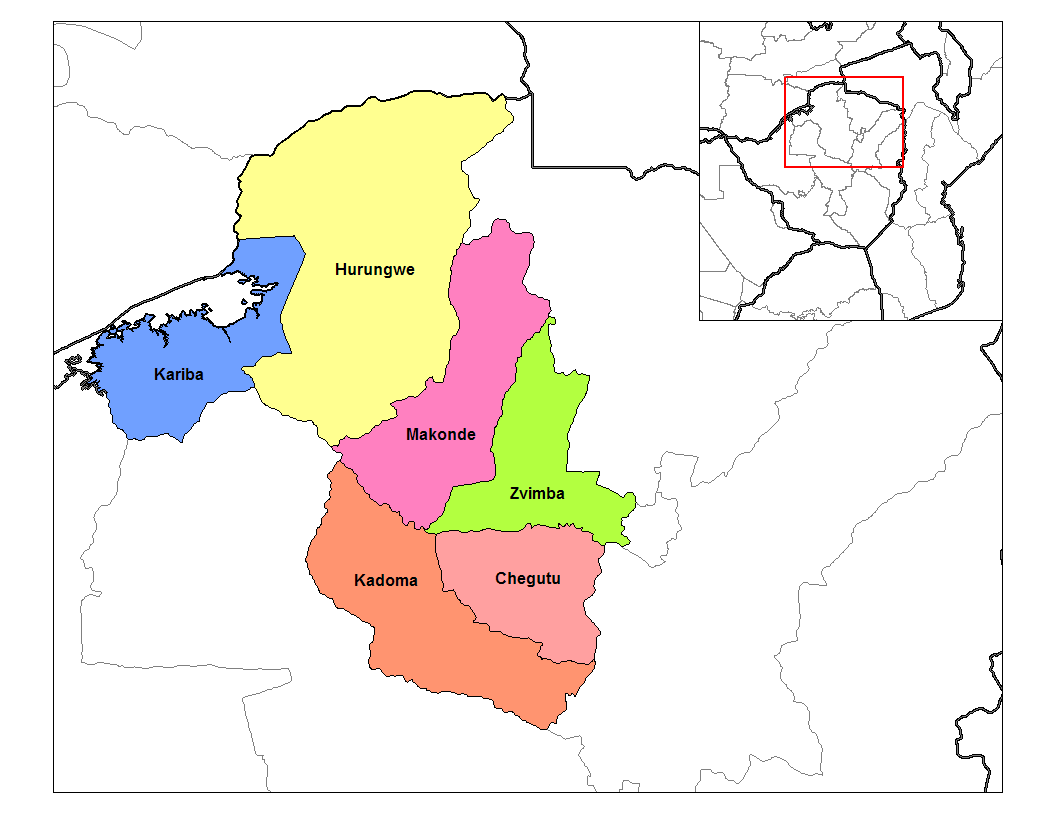
Kadoma District Mashonaland West Province till 2007

Kadoma District was a district in Zimbabwe. It was split in 2007 into two districts, namely Mhondoro–Ngezi District and Sanyati District, but now the northern part which is north of Harare-Bulawayo Highway is now in Sanyati District and south of Harare-Bulawayo Highway is in Mhondoro Ngezi District.

== Location ==
The district was located in Mashonaland West Province, one of the 10 administrative provinces in Zimbabwe. Its chief city, Kadoma, with an estimated population of 76,890 in 2004, lies approximately 166 kilometres (103 mi), by road, southwest of Harare, the national capital and largest city in the country. The coordinates of the district been:18° 18' 0.00"S, 29° 48' 0.00"E (Latitude:18.3000; Longitude:29.8000).

== Overview ==
Kadoma District was in the middle of a mining region. The chief minerals are gold, copper and nickel. The most significant mine of the region is the Cam and Motor Mine, which is located in Eiffel Flats, about 10 kilometres (6.2 mi), by road, northeast of Kadoma. Cam and Motor is the largest gold producer in Zimbabwe's history. Under the present regime, Cam and Motor is owned by Rio Tinto Zimbabwe. Other smaller mines in the district include: Venice Mine, Dalny Mine, Brompton Mine, Pickstone Mine, Etna Mine, Patchway Mine, Magisa Mines, Savannah Mines, Gatawa Mines. Cotton was grown in the district and there was some development of related industries before 1990. The David Whithead Textile Manufacturing Company was opened in 1952.

== Population ==
In 2002, the district population was estimated at 235,531 people.

== See also ==
- Districts of Zimbabwe
- Provinces of Zimbabwe
