= Karoi =

Karoi Town
- Location within Zimbabwe
- Coordinates: 16°48′36″S 29°42′00″E
- Country: Zimbabwe
- Province: Mashonaland West
- District: Hurungwe District
- City: Karoi Municipality
- Elevation: 1,275 m (4,183 ft)

Population (2022 census)
  - Total: 34,200
- Time zone: UTC+2 (CAT)
- Climate: Cwa

Karoi is a town in Zimbabwe.

== Location ==
Karoi is located in Karoi District, Mashonaland West Province, in central northern Zimbabwe. It is located approximately 85 kilometres (53 mi), by road, northwest of Chinhoyi, the nearest large town, and the location of the provincial headquarters. This location lies about 200 kilometres (120 mi), northwest of Harare, Zimbabwe's capital and largest city. Karoi lies along the main road, Highway A-1, between Harare and Chirundu, at the International border with the Republic of Zambia, about 170 kilometres (110 mi), further northwest of Karoi. The coordinates of Karoi are: 16° 48' 36.00"S, 29° 42' 0.00"E (Latitude:16.8100; Longitude:29.7000).

== Overview ==
In addition to the offices of Karoi Town Council, the town is also the location of the headquarters of Karoi District Administration. The surrounding countryside is farmland, where tobacco is the primary cash crop. In 2011, the Tobacco Industry and Marketing Board (TIMB) permitted Mashonaland Tobacco Company (MTC) to open auction floors and buy tobacco in the town, but controversy arose in 2012 about purchases from uncontracted farmers.

There are two hotels in the town: Karoi Hotel in the center of town and Twin River Inn, about 1.6 kilometres (0.99 mi), north of town, on the road to Kariba, approximately 135 kilometres (84 mi), northwest of Karoi. The main secondary schools in Karoi are Karoi High School and Chikangwe High School. The farming village of Tengwe lies about 30 kilometres (19 mi), southwest of Karoi.

== History ==
Karoi, a town located in Mashonaland West Province, Zimbabwe, has a rich history that intertwines indigenous heritage and colonial influences. The name "Karoi," which translates to "little witch" in Shona, is believed to be rooted in local folklore, though specific legends tied to this title remain largely unrecorded.

In 1945, after World War II, Karoi was designated by the government as a farming area, particularly for Caucasian veterans, who were given support to establish farms. These early settlers predominantly engaged in tobacco farming, establishing the crop as a key economic activity in the area—a role it continues to play today, sustaining Karoi’s agricultural economy and connecting it to regional and global markets.

Geographically, Karoi benefits from its location along the A-1 Highway, which links Zimbabwe’s capital, Harare, with the town of Chirundu on the Zambian border. This route makes Karoi a popular rest stop and supply center for travelers and transporters, as well as a central hub for the local population. The town’s accessibility and agricultural focus have shaped its development and sustained its role as a rural service center for the region.

== Population ==
During the 1992 national census, the population of the town of Karoi was estimated at 14,763. In 2004, the population estimate was 25,030. Karoi has a suburb called Chikangwe, located about 2 kilometres (1.2 mi), east of the central business district.

== Climate ==
Climate data for Karoi (1961–1990, extremes 1951–present)
Month	Jan	Feb	Mar	Apr	May	Jun	Jul	Aug	Sep	Oct	Nov	Dec	Year
Record high °C (°F)	35.8 (96.4)	33.6 (92.5)	31.7 (89.1)	33.6 (92.5)	30.9 (87.6)	28.0 (82.4)	28.1 (82.6)	31.2 (88.2)	34.7 (94.5)	35.7 (96.3)	36.5 (97.7)	33.7 (92.7)	36.5 (97.7)
Mean daily maximum °C (°F)	25.8 (78.4)	25.6 (78.1)	25.8 (78.4)	25.6 (78.1)	24.1 (75.4)	22.2 (72.0)	22.2 (72.0)	24.6 (76.3)	27.8 (82.0)	29.5 (85.1)	28.0 (82.4)	26.0 (78.8)	25.6 (78.1)
Daily mean °C (°F)	20.6 (69.1)	20.3 (68.5)	20.0 (68.0)	18.9 (66.0)	16.8 (62.2)	14.7 (58.5)	14.6 (58.3)	16.6 (61.9)	20.1 (68.2)	22.2 (72.0)	21.9 (71.4)	20.7 (69.3)	18.9 (66.0)
Mean daily minimum °C (°F)	16.9 (62.4)	16.8 (62.2)	15.9 (60.6)	14.0 (57.2)	11.2 (52.2)	8.7 (47.7)	8.2 (46.8)	9.9 (49.8)	13.0 (55.4)	16.0 (60.8)	16.9 (62.4)	16.9 (62.4)	13.7 (56.7)
Record low °C (°F)	13.4 (56.1)	13.0 (55.4)	10.7 (51.3)	7.3 (45.1)	4.9 (40.8)	1.9 (35.4)	2.1 (35.8)	3.6 (38.5)	5.3 (41.5)	8.1 (46.6)	10.7 (51.3)	12.2 (54.0)	1.9 (35.4)
Average rainfall mm (inches)	178.6 (7.03)	191.6 (7.54)	111.9 (4.41)	39.8 (1.57)	6.7 (0.26)	1.7 (0.07)	2.0 (0.08)	1.1 (0.04)	4.5 (0.18)	19.7 (0.78)	73.4 (2.89)	173.1 (6.81)	804.1 (31.66)
Average rainy days	17	16	11	4	2	1	0	0	1	3	9	15	79
Mean monthly sunshine hours	182.9	165.2	210.8	240.0	266.6	258.0	282.1	300.7	294.0	275.9	222.0	176.7	2,874.9
Mean daily sunshine hours	5.9	5.9	6.8	8.0	8.6	8.6	9.1	9.7	9.8	8.9	7.4	5.7	7.9
Source 1: World Meteorological Organization, NOAA (sun and mean temperature, 1961–1990)
Source 2: Meteo Climat (record highs and lows)

== See also ==
- Kariba Dam
- Lake Kariba
- List of power stations in Zimbabwe
