= Mvurwi Range =

Mountain range in Zimbabwe

- Location within Zimbabwe

Highest point
- Elevation: 1,740 m (5,710 ft)
- Prominence: 312 m (1,024 ft)
- Coordinates: 16°38′04″S 30°53′51″E

Geography
- Location: Zimbabwe

Climbing
- Easiest route: Hike

The Mvurwi range of mountains is located in northern Zimbabwe. It stretches about 160 km from Lake Manyame, just west of Harare, north to the Zambezi Escarpment. It rises to its highest point of 1740m at the Mavurwe beacon. The northernmost part of the mountain range is Mavuradonha, which is a protected area.

It is an important chromium mining region.
