= Vanad =

Vanad is a village in the province of Mashonaland West, Zimbabwe. It is located about 12 km north of Mutorashanga in the Mvurwi Range. The village started as a residential settlement for the Vanad chromite mine, operated by ZimAlloys.

According to the 1982 Population Census, the village had a population of 2,565. With the closure of the mine, Vanad became a Ghost town.
