= Chinhoyi =

City in Zimbabwe

Chinhoyi Sinoia
- City
- Coat of arms

- Location within Zimbabwe
- Coordinates: 17°20′59″S 30°11′40″E
- Country: Zimbabwe
- Province: Mashonaland West
- District: Makonde District
- City: Chinhoyi Municipality
- Established: 1906
- Elevation: 1,187 m (3,894 ft)

Population (2022 census)
  - Total: 90,800
- Time zone: UTC+2 (CAT)
- Climate: Cwa

Chinhoyi, previously known as Sinoia during the colonial era, is a city in the Makonde District of central northern Zimbabwe. It has a population of 90,800 and is primarily a college town, although it was originally founded as an Italian group settlement scheme. The nearby Chinhoyi Caves and national park are a popular attraction.

== Geography ==
Chinhoyi is located on the western banks of the Manyame River, in Makonde District, in Mashonaland West Province in central northern Zimbabwe. Its location lies approximately 116 kilometres (72 mi) by road, northwest of Harare the capital of Zimbabwe and the largest city in the country. Chinhoyi lies on the main road, Highway A-1, between Harare and Chirundu, at the international border with Zambia, about 240 kilometres (150 mi), further northwest of Chinhoyi.

The geographical coordinates of Chinhoyi are:17°20'59.0"S, 30°11'40.0"E (Latitude:-17.349722; Longitude:30.194444). Chinhoyi sits at an average elevation of 1,187 metres (3,894 ft) above mean sea level.

There are a number of small towns which are close to Chinhoyi. Banket lies about 25 kilometres (16 mi), southeast of Chinhoyi on the road to Harare, while Alaska lies approximately 15 kilometres (9 mi) directly west of town, and Lion's Den lies about 25 kilometres (16 mi) northwest of Chinhoyi on the road to Chirundu.

== Overview ==
Chinhoyi is the provincial capital of Mashonaland West Province, one of the ten administrative provinces in Zimbabwe. It is also the district headquarters of Makonde District, one of the six districts in the province.

Chinhoyi houses Chinhoyi Provincial Hospital, the largest and most modern referral hospital in Mashonaland West Province. Some of the hotels in town include Chinhoyi Hotel in the center, the Orange Grove Motel about 1 kilometre (1 mi) northwest of town on the road to Karoi and the Caves Motel, located about 8 kilometres (5 mi) northwest of town next to the Chinhoyi caves. Tourist attractions in Chinhoyi include the Chinhoyi Caves in Chinhoyi Caves National Park.

== History ==
The town was established as Sinoia in 1906, as a group settlement scheme by a wealthy Italian, Lieutenant Margherito Guidotti. He encouraged ten Italian families to settle here. The Rhodesian Bush War started in this town in the area occupied by the Chinhoyi Provincial Hospital. The name Sinoria derives from Tjinoyi, a Lozwi/Rozwi Chief who is believed to have been a son of Lukuluba (corrupted to Mukuruva by the Zezuru), who was the third son of Emperor Netjasike. The Kalanga (Lozwi/Rozwi name) was changed to Sinoia by the white settlers and later Chinhoyi by the Zezuru.

== Education ==
Chinhoyi is a college town, hosting two of the country's major universities; Chinhoyi University of Technology (CUT) and Zimbabwe Open University (ZOU). The principal secondary schools in Chinhoyi include the three government high schools; Chinhoyi High School, Chemagamba High School and Nemakonde High School, together with the private high school Lomagundi College.

== Religion ==
The Catholic Diocese of Chinhoyi, formerly called the Diocese of Sinoia, is based here. Chinhoyi Mission was established by German Jesuits in 1958.

== Transport ==
Transport to and from Chinhoyi is mainly by road. Bus services connect Chinhoyi with Harare, Karoi, Kariba, Mhangura, Bulawayo, and smaller villages in the district. Chinhoyi is on a rail branch from Harare, which ends at Lions Den. There are scheduled passenger trains. Taxis operate within the town area. There is also a local bus service. There is a small airport for private planes, called Chinhoyi Airstrip, located about 16 kilometres (10 mi), south-east of the central business district. The airport is said to be in need of maintenance. Its geographical coordinates are quoted as:17°25'58.8"S, 30°18'00.0"E (Latitude:-17.433000; Longitude:30.300000).

== Economy ==
Chinhoyi's economy is a tertiary industry meaning that it is mainly a service industry based economy. It consists of retailing, financial services, wholesaling, and provincial government services since the city is the provincial capital. Education and the construction industry influence the economy of the city. The presence of Chinhoyi University of Technology and the construction of new houses contribute to the town's economy. The city also provides many services to the surrounding small towns like Banket, Kasimure, Mutorashanga, as well as to the whole of the Makonde district.

== Population ==
The population of Chinhoyi during the 2002 census was 56,794. After the 2012 national census, the city population was estimated at 77,292 people. At that time it was the 11th largest urban centre in Zimbabwe.

== Recreational sites ==
=== Chinhoyi Caves ===
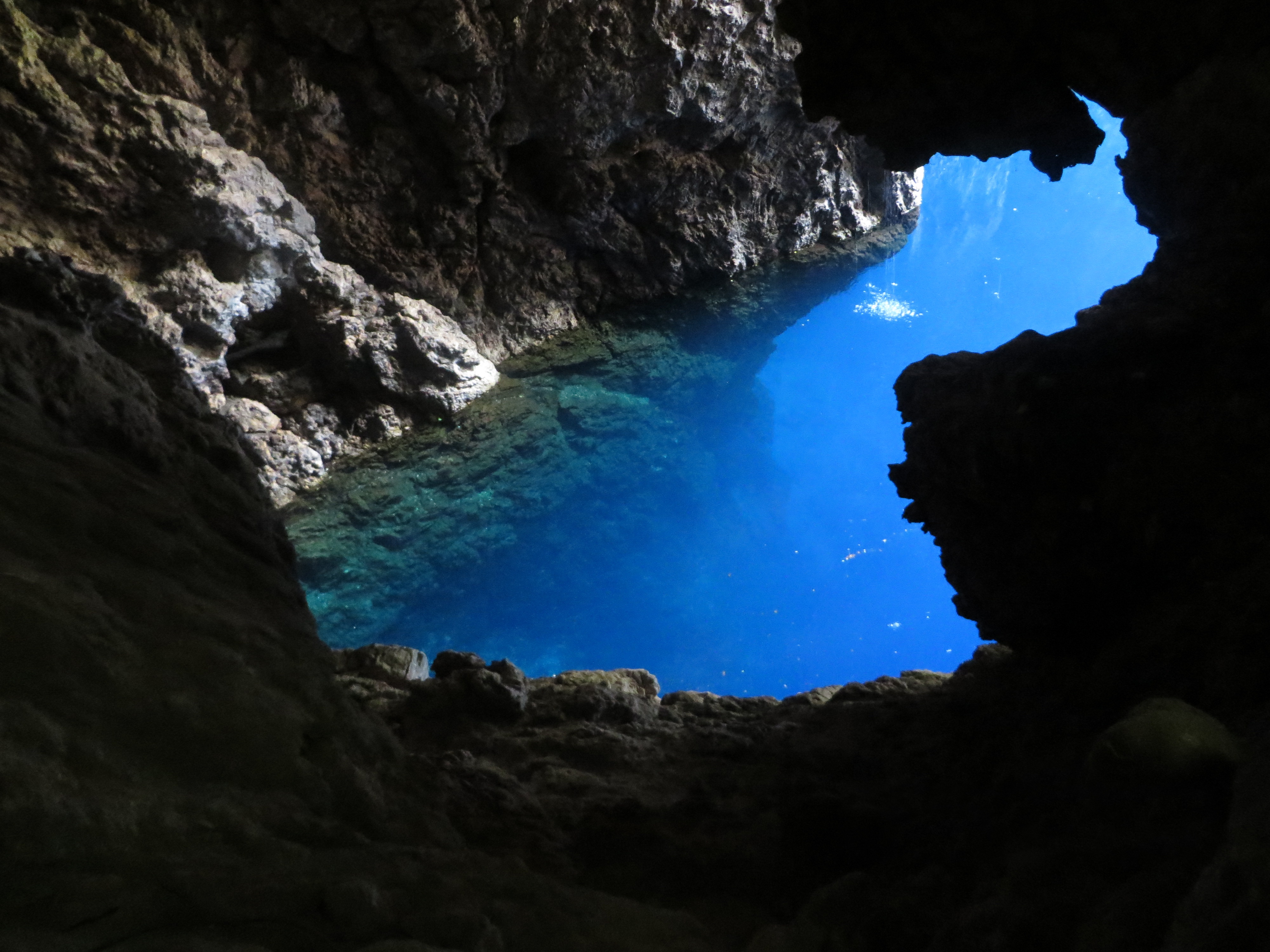
Sleeping Pool, Chinhoyi caves

These are a group of limestone and dolomite caves situated about 9 kilometers northwest of Chinhoyi along the A-1 Highway. The main cave contains a pool of cobalt blue water, which is popularly called Sleeping Pool or Chirorodziva ("Pool of the Fallen"). They have been designated as a national park and they are managed by the Zimbabwe Parks & Wildlife Management Authority. These limestone caves were first described to Europeans by Frederick Courtney Selous in 1887, but the caves have an important place in African traditional religion, with the caves themselves as a site for rainmaking, surrounded by a sacred forest, whose trees could not be felled.

== See also ==
- Railway stations in Zimbabwe
- Districts of Zimbabwe
- Provinces of Zimbabwe
- Economy of Zimbabwe
