= Mashonaland West Province =

Coordinates: 17°00′S 29°30′E

Mashonaland West: Dunhu reMashonaland West (Shona); Isabelo seMashonaland West (Northern Ndebele)
- Province
- Mashonaland West, Province of Zimbabwe
- Country: Zimbabwe
- Capital: Chinhoyi

Government
  - Type: Provincial Government
  - Minister of State for Provincial Affairs: Marian Chombo (ZANU-PF)

Area
  - Total: 57,441 km^{2} (22,178 sq mi)

Population (2022 census)
  - Total: 1,893,584
  - Density: 32.966/km^{2} (85.381/sq mi)
- HDI (2018): 0.548 low · 5th

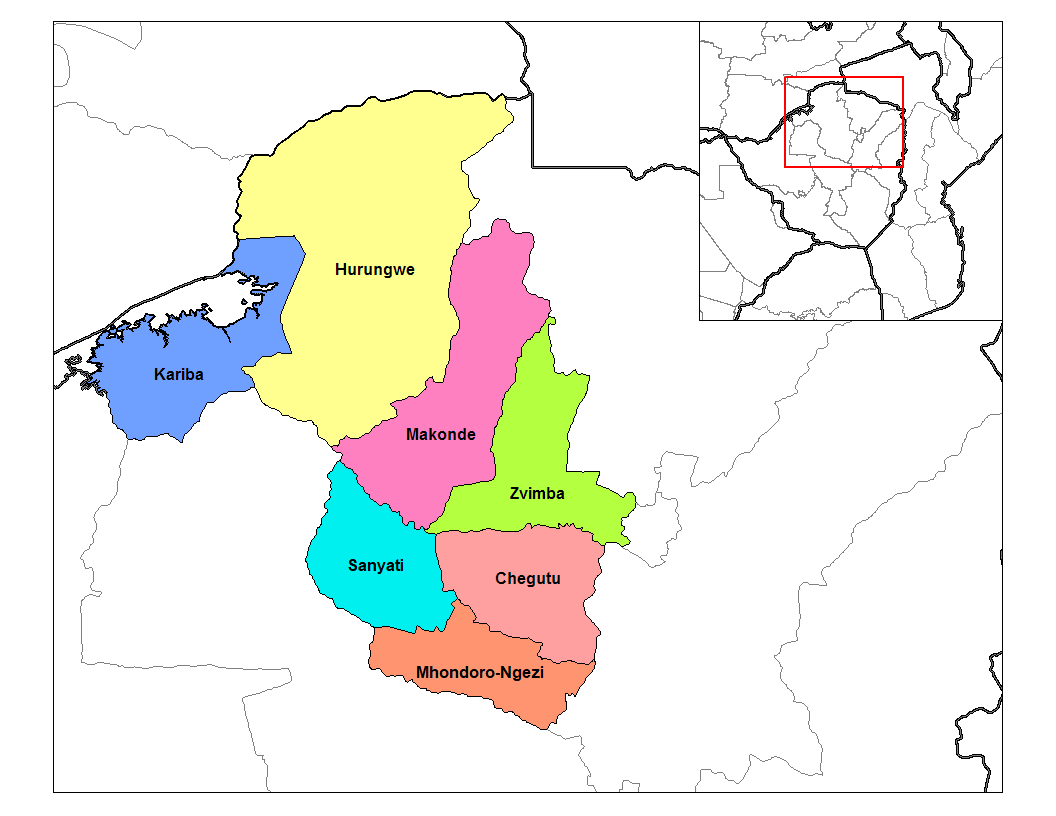
Districts of Mashonaland West

Mashonaland West is a province of Zimbabwe. It has an area of 57,441 km² and a population of approximately 1.9 million (2022). Chinhoyi is the capital of the province.

== Demographics ==
Census	Population
2002	1,224,670
2012	1,501,656
2022	1,893,584

== Geography ==
=== Districts ===
Mashonaland West is divided into 7 districts:

- Chegutu
- Hurungwe
- Kariba
- Makonde
- Mhondoro-Ngezi
- Sanyati
- Zvimba

== See also ==
- Provinces of Zimbabwe
- Districts of Zimbabwe
