= Divine Ndhlukula =

Zimbabwean businesswoman and farmer

Dr Divine Ndhlukula
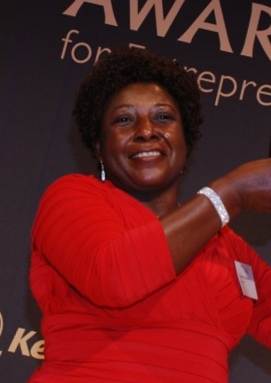
- Born: Divine Simbi; February 5, 1960 (age 66); Gutu, Zimbabwe
- Education: Midlands State University (MBA), Women's University in Africa (MBA)
- Occupations: Businesswoman; Farmer
- Employer: DDNS Security Operations
- Spouse: Stanely Ndhlukula (late)
- Children: David Simbi
- Parent(s): Mary and Piniel Simbi
- Website: www.divinendhlukula.co.zw

Dr Divine Ndhlukula is a Zimbabwean businesswoman, founder and Managing Director of DDNS Security Operations (Pvt) Ltd which is the holding company for SECURICO Security Services. Dr Ndhlukula is the past president of Zimbabwe National Chamber of Commerce (ZNCC) and Chairperson for Women’s Desk.

== Early life and education ==
She was born on 5 February 1960 in rural Gutu to Mary and Piniel Simbi. She grew up in Gutu, having attended a number of schools, namely, Zvinavashe School, Machingambi School, Bondolfi Mission, St. Domincs Secondary School, Makumbe Mission. She was married to Stanely Ndhlukula (late) and has one son - David Simbi and two grandchildren. She studied for an Executive Masters in Business Administration (MBA) at Midlands State University and she holds another an MBA from Women’s University in Africa and a PhD in Business Leadership from the Women’s University which was conferred in recognition of her business leadership and gender equality initiatives.

== General career ==
She worked for Zimbabwe Broadcasting Corporation and Old Mutual for six years as an Accounting Officer and then joined Intermarket Life Assurance as a Marketing Executive where she worked for 16 years and left to found SECURICO.

== Business career ==
She founded a security company Securico from humble beginnings in Zimbabwe in 1998. In an interview she said that the idea to form Securico was conceived out of the need to earn a livelihood but critically to revolutionize the male dominated security industry. Speaking to a Zimbabwean newspaper she said:

I thought there was a gap in the industry. Companies that were there were not living up to the needs of the clients. The industry was renowned for wild cat strikes and guards generally were perceived as the lowly-paid in any sector. I wanted to change the perceptions and create a niche in which people could carve out a career and I knew I needed to go in with a different approach and that approach was going to make the difference, the people had to be key or central feature of the vision.

Securico is the first Zimbabwean staffed security company to be certified to the internationally acclaimed ISO9001:2008 Quality Management System.

== Positions held ==
- Security Association Zimbabwe – Past Chairman
- Chamber of Mines – Past Chairperson of the Joint Suppliers and Producers Committee
- Zimbabwe National Chamber of Commerce (ZNCC) - Past President
- Zimbabwe National Chamber of Commerce (ZNCC) – Chairperson of Women’s Desk
- Professional Executives & Businesswomen Forum (PROWEB) – Trustee
- African Women Entrepreneurs Prog (AWEP) – Founding Trustee
- Harare Sunshine Holdings
- Member of the National Competitiveness Commission Board
- First Lady Development Advisory Board
- Inducted in the prestigious JA International Global Business Hall of Fame 2021
- Recognised as one of the Top 100 Women CEOs in Africa in 2019
- PROWEB (Professional Women, Women Executives and Business Women’s Forum) President: current (Year 2021)

== Philanthropic Work ==
She is the founder of the Mentorship in Practice programme, Woman Owned Brand initiative, an offshoot of the Women in Enterprise Conference and Awards platform which she started in 2013 to help women scale up their businesses. Became the first SADC member at Women Presidents Organization.

In November 2022, she launched Mbuya Mary Simbi library in her home area of Gutu that benefits 8 catchment schools where she is also paying fees for disadvantaged kids.

== Honours and awards ==
- Empretec Entrepreneur of the Year 2001 and Empretec Entrepreneur of Decade (Services Sector) 2002;
- Manager of the year 2005 for Zim Institute of Management
- Celebrate a Sister Business award 2006
- Institute of Directors Zimbabwe Director of the Year (SMEs) 2008
- Institute of Directors Overral Director of Year(Run Up) 2009
- Zimbabwe Women Filmmakers/UNifem Business Award 2010.
- National Quality Awards Company of the Year 2011
- Zimbabwe’s 7th Best Employers 2010 and 7th Best Employer again for 2011
- Africa Awards for Entrepreneurship 2011 Grand Prize run by Legatum and Omidyar.
- National Annual Quality Awards – Individual Winner 2012
- Woman Investor of the Year by Zimbabwe Investment Authority 2013
- Overall Winner (Services) Africa’s Most Influential Women in Business and Government 2013 by CEO of South Africa
- African Woman of the Year 2013 African Achievers Awards
- EY World Entrepreneur Award Southern Africa – Exceptional category 2014 Winner.
- International Women Entrepreneurial Challenge Awardee 2014
- UNCTAD/Empretec Top Ten Global Women in Business 2014
- Women Heritage Society Hall of Fame 2014
- Zimbabwe National Leadership Excellent Award Private Sector Award Winner 2016
- Zimbabwe Northern Region Leadership Excellence Awards Private Sector Winner 2016
- One of the Top 10 Most Influential Businesspeople Post independence Zimbabwe. –Empretec
- Zimbabwe Institute of Management 2017 Leadership Excellence- Private Sector Leader of the Year award
