= Indian Economic Trade Organization =

Non-governmental trade association

- Founded: 2013; 13 years ago
- Founder: Dr. Asif Iqbal; S. Krishnakumar
- Type: Non-governmental trade association
- Purpose: Policy advocacy
- Headquarters: Bangalore, India
- Key people: S. Krishnakumar (Chairman); Asif Iqbal (President)
- Website: www.ieto.in

Indian Economic Trade Organization (IETO) is an Indian non-governmental trade association and advocacy group. It supports the countries to bolster industry support for stronger participation in the multilateral trade negotiations process.

== Background and history ==
The Indian Economic Trade Organization was founded in 2013 by the former Minister of State for Defense and Agriculture, S. Krishnakumar IAS and Dr. Asif Iqbal, who was the executive director of the Asian Arab Chamber of Commerce.

IETO provides consultation services to the foreign companies that seeking local partners, collaborations for service distribution networks, events and conferences. IETO also receives funds for operations from its members within India. It organizes Asian Arab Awards every year with various partners like the Bahrain Businesswomens Society. The nominees and achievers are selected by an international jury that has offices in GCC Countries and in the 21 other countries of the continent.

The Indian Economic Trade Organization also conducts green iftar every year to bring in inclusiveness in the society on the World Environment Day, which dishes are substituted with vegetarian food made from organic vegetables. In 2016, it collaborated with the Consulate General of Israel to invite Muslim community for Iftar dinner with the Chief Imam of India. IETO took the Delegation of Karnataka Chief Minister HD Kumaraswamy to provide support for agriculture, security, innovation and start-ups. It has also worked in for strengthening Bosnia India Relations by starting economic and trade activities in Bosnia with the help of local participation. Later IETO has also opened for collaborations in Kosovo for the economic and trade betterment.

The president welcomed the Indian delegation's visit to Armenia and their intention to develop cooperation. The delegation was headed by Dr. Asif Iqbal and consisted of Bharat Lal Meena, Chairman of the BEST Innovation University and Ashok Alur, the Vice Chancellor of the BEST University. IETO launched the Djibouti Trade forum in Hyderabad in the presence of the Ambassador of Djibouti in India Mr. Said Absieh Warsama and the business community in Hyderabad. IETO formed the BBIN chamber of commerce to foster trade and Commerce between the four countries Bhutan, Bangladesh, India and Nepal, to build effective relations and to fill in gaps left by MSMEs in all four countries. The BBIN announced the centenary celebrations of Sheikh Mujibur Rahman in India in 2020 to foster friendship between two nations.

IETO organized the 2019 International Migrants Day in New Delhi, attended by Wael Battrekhi, minister counsellor for Palestine's embassy in India. IETO organised the India Africa Economic Forum in association with the India Africa Trade Council with 23 countries and Ambassadors of Zimbabwe, Malawi, Zambia, Gabon and Namibia, Ghana, Ethiopia and ministerial delegates from Mali, Mauritania, Tunisia, and Ivory Coast.

In 2020, Dr Asif Iqbal, the president of IETO inaugurated The Indo-Baltic Trade Council.

In Feb 2021, IETO opens the Asian Arab chamber of Commerce in Chennai, India, which was inaugurated by Ambassador of Kazakhstan Yerlan Alimbayev. In the same month India Tunisia business council was also launched.

In March 2021, IETO in collaboration with the Latin America Caribbean Federation of India opened the Ecuador trade office in Bangalore which was inaugurated by Ambassador of Ecuador to India, Hector Gonzalo Cueva.

IETO led the Indian official delegation to Zimbabwe in association with the Zimbabwe National Chamber of Commerce (ZNCC) and Zimbabwe Miners Federation (ZNF) . The delegation signed 19 MOU's in areas of Smart Mining, Agriculture, Tourism, Health and Films. The delegation was hosted by the Deputy Minister of Trade & Commerce Mr. Raj Modi.

The President of the IETO Dr. Asif Iqbal was invited by the Russian Government to lead Indian delegation at the St. Petersburg International Economic Forum which was held in Saint Petersburg in June 2021. During this time Dr. Iqbal met with the Governor of Saint Petersburg Alexander Beglov, Vice President of the Saint Petersburg Chamber of Commerce Ekaterina Lebedeva and Consul General of India Deepak Miglani, IFS from the Ministry of External Affairs, Govt of India.

On 3 August 2021, the Namibia High Commissioner in India Gabriel Sinimbo inaugurated the India Namibia Trade Forum in Chennai, along with the Director of the Ministry of External Affairs Venkatachallam Murugan and the President of the Indian Economic Trade Organization Dr. Asif Iqbal. The delegation from South India went to Namibia in March 2020 to conduct the India Namibia business forum with more than 50 Namibian companies.

Namibia mulls direct export of diamonds and semi-precious stones to India.

The IETO organized the EAC (East Africa Community) summit in New Delhi which saw participation of the High Commissioner of Rwanda in India Ms. Jacqueline Mukangira and the High Commissioner of Tanzania Baraka H. Luvanda, both members of the EAC. The chief guest was Mr. Puneet Kundal IFS, the Joint Secretary of the East and South Africa (E&SA) Division, Ministry of External Affairs, Govt of India.

In December 2021, The Ambassador of Sierra Leone to India Rashid Sesay was welcomed by Dr. Asif Iqbal, President of IETO and various trade initiatives were discussed including the visit of Multisectoral Indian Delegation to Sierra Leone.

The President of the IETO and India Africa Trade Council (IATC) Dr. Asif Iqbal and the India Pacific Trade Council organized the Launch of Papua New Guinea coffee in India with the High Commissioner of Papua New Guinea Paulias Korni OBE and the Finance Minister of Tamil Nadu Palanivel Thiaga Rajan in Chennai with the Ministry of External Affairs Head of Secretariat Mr. Venkatachalam Murugan.

In March 2022, The trade Delegation from Telangana for Pharma and Diamond sectors was announced to Namibia by the High Commissioner of Namibia.

In March 2022, IETO starts India Cuba Trade and Pharma Relationships in Telangana.

In May 2022, First Lady of Zimbabwe Dr. Auxillia Mnangagwa, visited India along with 23 member delegation on behalf of the Angel of Hope Foundation, she was received by IETO president Asif Iqbal, Amararam Gurjar, Director (East and South Africa Division) Ministry of External Affairs, Govt of India and the Ambassador of Zimbabwe to India Dr. Majoni Godfrey Chipare.

In 2022, IATC President Asif Iqbal, participated in the CHOGM2022 meeting in Kigali Rwanda and met various heads of state to discuss trade relations, these included the President of Guyana Irfan Ali, Prime Minister of Bahamas Philip Davis, Prime Minister of SAMOA Ms. Fiamē Naomi Mataʻafa, CEO of Rwanda Development Board Clare Akamanzi, Foreign Minister of Gabon Michael Moussa Adamo, Foreign Minister of Bangladesh Dr. A. K. Abdul Momen, CEO of Trade Malta Anton Buttigeig, CEO of the Botswana Investment and Trade Centre Keletsositse Olebile, Ambassador of Samoa in Belgium Francella Strickland, Chairman of EDO state Government in Nigeria Greg Obgeifun and representative of IMF in Rwanda, Gabor Pula.

In September 2022, IETO Delegation visited Namibia for the Mining Expo and participated in the India Namibia Conference which also saw the appointment of Kamaldeep Gill as Agriculture Commissioner of the India Africa Trade Council.

In 2022, The Indian delegation visited Ghana to inaugurate the office of the Central and Western Africa as Headquarter of IATC Central and West Africa. That same year, a MOU was signed between Indian Economic Trade Organization and Lesotho as well as with Gabon for business between the two respective nations.

IETO is coordinating with local Indian companies on trade with Russia to Conduct Bilateral Business in Local Currencies and promote UPI system of payments. To bypass the dollar-denominated trades by creating an alternative payment ecosystem other than the global SWIFT platform.

IETO delegation visited Jamaica and were hosted by the Indian High Commissioner Masakui Rungsung and Senator Aubyn Hill, Minister of Industry, Investment, & Commerce of Jamaica. The delegation was accompanied by Sujata Vanjamuri the Trade Commissioner of the Latin American Caribbean Trade Council.

The India Africa Trade Council organized the IATC 2023 Awards for Excellence in the continental relationships. The recipients this year were the Vice President of Zimbabwe, Trade Minister of Malawi and Gabon, Housing Minister from Republic of Chad, Ministers from Congo and High commissioner from Eswatini and Namibia along with other Indian companies like Jindal Steel, ITC Agro, Afro Asian Rural Development Organization among others.

In August 2023, The regional office of the India ASEAN trade council was inaugurated in Pune by the Maharashtra's Minister of Social Welfare, Dileep Kamble and MLA Eknath Khadse. Dr Sachin Kate was appointed as the Trade Commissioner of the India ASEAN Trade Council. That same month IETO Signed MOU with the University of Commonwealth Caribbean in New Delhi in the presence of High Commissioner of Jamaica Jason Hall, High Commissioner of Gabon Josephine Ntyam, and High Commissioner of Seychelles Harisoa Lalatiana Accouche in New Delhi. The conference witnessed representation from The Gambia, Australia, Malaysia and Papua New Guinea.

In Dec 2023, IETO Delegation met with Ambassador of India in Vietnam, Sandeep Arya and briefed him about the Signed MOU with the Vietnamese counterparts Global Genius Network in Hai Phong city. Mr. Nguyen Phu was appointed Director of Vietnam for India ASEAN Trade Council.

In 2023, a delegation of IETO visited Vietnam to attend the Horasis conference in Binh Duong. IETO delegation, led by consul general of India in Vietnam, Madan Mohan Sethi, was also invited by the Dak Lak Province.

As of October 2024, Bency George holds a position on the Board of Directors of the India-GCC Trade Council. He is also Director of Corporate International Relations at the Indian Economic Trade Organization (IETO).

As of April 2026, https://globaldiplomacy.in/2026/04/20/ieto-and-saez-bangladesh-advance-strategic-collaboration-in-dhaka/ , Bangladesh Advance Strategic Collaboration in Dhaka to Strengthen South Asian Economic Integration as present Dr.Asif Igbal (IETO) and Mr.Mahamud Hasan (SAEZ)
