= Zimbabwe Institute of Legal Studies =

Law school in Harare, Zimbabwe

- zils logo
- Other names: ZILS
- Motto: Equip – Empower – Enhance
- Type: private
- Established: 2 February 2010
- Founders: Godwills Masimirembwa
- Academic affiliations: Ministry of Higher and Tertiary Education Institute of Forensic Accountants
- Chairman: Godwills Masimirembwa
- Academic staff: 30
- Students: approx 300
- Location: 53 Fife Avenue, Harare, Harare, Zimbabwe; 17.8216894°S 31.0443885°E
- Language: English
- Colors: Gold and Navy blue
- Website: www.zils.ac.zw

The Zimbabwe Institute of Legal Studies (ZILS) in Harare, is the first and currently only college awarding law courses in Zimbabwe. It was founded in 2009 by Godwills Masimirembwa a lawyer by profession and former chairman of the ZMDC. First students enrolled in 2010 and all programmes are taught in the English language. The college awards five courses (Applied Law, Forensic Science and Crime Investigations, Forensic Accounting And Fraud Investigations, Mineral Law And Policy, Commerce And Law) up to National Diploma (ND) level through five law-related departments. The college is accredited by the National Council for Higher Education, under the Ministry of Higher and Tertiary Education. Therefore, the courses awarded by the ZILS have equal weight as courses awarded by Harare Polytechnic because their courses are accredited by the same body. In theory, the ZILS is a polytechnic of law because Harare Polytechnic does not offer law courses.

== History ==
The Zimbabwe Institute of Legal Studies officially opened for business in 2010 with its founder assuming chairmanship of the college. In 2012, the Law Society of Zimbabwe threatened to disrepute the college by claiming not to recognize its certificates and diplomas. It appeared that the President of the LSZ had a personal feud with Godwills Masimirembwa because he only questions awards by the ZILS and accepts any qualification from colleges abroad. In 2018, the institution partnered with CEE Creative Zimbabwe Web Design, a web development company, to provide online library services.

== Courses ==
1. Applied Law
2. Forensic Science and Crime Investigations
3. Forensic Accounting And Fraud Investigations
4. Mineral Law And Policy
5. Commerce And Law

== See also ==
1. Zimbabwe Institute of Management
2. Zimbabwe Institution of Engineers
