= Zie =

Zie or variants could refer to:

- The pronunciation of the letter Z
- Zié, an Ivorian masculine given name
- Zimbabwe Institution of Engineers, a professional organization
- ZieZie, a British rapper

== See also ==
- Z (disambiguation)
