= India Africa Trade Council =

- Abbreviation: IATC
- Type: Non-governmental trade association
- Services: Business promotion, networking, policy reforms
- Website: www.indafrica.in

India Africa Trade Council (IATC) is an Indian non-governmental trade association that provides a platform to enhance business activities between India and Africa.

== Background ==
IATC is a non-profit, trade association, that provides Indian Businessmen a platform to do trade with African countries. The IATC secretariat consist of different sub committees. It was established in Chennai for establishing business relations between India and African countries. IATC was inaugurated by Nagma Mallick, Additional Secretary (Africa) Ambassador and Dr Tizita Mulugeta Yimam, the Ambassador of Ethiopia in India. IATC has trade offices in different cities of India to that include Kolkata, Mumbai, Pune, Ahmedabad, Indore, Ranchi, Bhubaneshwar, Hyderabad, Chennai, Kochi, Bangalore and Hyderabad. IATC offices in Africa are in Accra, Tunis, Rabat, Djibouti, Ethiopia, Zimbabwe, Namibia, Botswana, South Africa, Mauritius, Kenya and Zambia.

== History ==
In August 2021, Dr James Rajamani, CEO of Kingdom Exim Group, was sworn into the office of the representative of the IATC West Africa Region. Jeremiah Quayson has been appointed director of corporate affairs for West Africa at India Africa trade council and honored lifetime honorary membership of the council.

In May 2021, Jeremiah Quayson, IATC's corporate affairs director met with Albert Nyakotey, MP for Yilo Krobo.

In June 2021, The AfCFTA committee was launched at the Ghana Embassy in New Delhi.

In December 2021, Rashid Sesay, the Ambassador of Sierra Leone was welcomed by Dr. Asif Iqbal, President of IETO and various trade initiatives were discussed including the visit of Multisectoral Indian Delegation to Sierra Leone.

Dr. Shrenik Nahar is appointed the Trade Commissioner of India Africa Trade Council at the Tanzania Desk in order to promote bilateral relations for trade and commerce.

In 2022, IATC president Asif Iqbal participated in the CHOGM2022 meeting in Kigali Rwanda and met various heads of state to discuss trade relations, these included the president of Guyana Irfan Ali, Prime Minister of Bahamas Philip Davis, Prime Minister of SAMOA Ms. Fiamē Naomi Mataʻafa, CEO of Rwanda Development Board Clare Akamanzi, Foreign Minister of Gabon Michael Moussa Adamo, Foreign Minister of Bangladesh Dr. A. K. Abdul Momen, CEO of Trade Malta Anton Buttigeig, CEO of the Botswana Investment and Trade Centre Keletsositse Olebile, Ambassador of Samoa in Belgium Francella Strickland, chairman of EDO state Government in Nigeria Greg Obgeifun and representative of IMF in Rwanda, Gabor Pula.

The India Africa Trade Council organised the IATC 2023 Awards for Excellence in the continental relationships. The recipients this year were the vice president of Zimbabwe, trade minister of Malawi and Gabon, housing minister from Republic of Chad, ministers from Congo and high commissioner from Eswatini and Namibia, along with other Indian companies like Jindal Steel, ITC Agro, Afro Asian Rural Development Organization, among others.

Between 2022 and 2023, the chief operating officer of the India Africa Trade Council was Bency George. He also was director of global markets & missions.

Tunisia

In February 2021, India Africa Trade Council established the India Tunisia Business Council.

Tanzania

In April 2025, the India Africa Trade Council (IATC) announced the appointment of Vinayak S. Menon as the Honorary Trade Commissioner of Tanzania to India. The appointment was formally conferred by Her Excellency Anisa Kapufi Mbega, High Commissioner of the United Republic of Tanzania to India, during an official ceremony attended by IETO President Dr. Asif Iqbal. The designation reflects ongoing efforts to enhance bilateral trade and investment cooperation, with Menon tasked with facilitating business engagement between Indian enterprises and Tanzanian governmental and private-sector institutions.

Namibia

Namibia Trade office was opened in Chennai under the India Namibia Trade Forum with support from the IATC. The office was inaugurated byeconomic diplomacy, Gabriel Sinimbo the high commissioner of Namibia in India and the president of the IATC Dr. Asif Iqbal. The trade Delegation from Telangana for Pharma and Diamond sectors was announced to Namibia by the high commissioner of Namibia. In September 2022, IETO Delegation visited Namibia for the Mining Expo and participated in the India Namibia Conference which also saw the appointment of Kamaldeep Gill as Agriculture Commissioner of the India Africa Trade Council.

Ghana

In March 2021, Ghana Trade center was inaugurated by high commissioner of Ghana in Bengaluru, Sebastian Beliwine. The delegation also offered to set up a food processing unit and IT institute in Ghana. In August 2021, Dr James Rajamani, CEO of Kingdom Exim Group, has been sworn into the office of the representative of the IATC West Africa Region. Jeremiah Quayson has been appointed director of corporate affairs for West Africa at India Africa trade council and honored lifetime honorary membership of the council. In October 2022, The Indian delegation visited Ghana to inaugurate the office of the Central and Western Africa as Headquarter of IATC Central and West Africa, along with The Gã Mantse, Nii Tackie Teiko Tsuru II, and the Deputy Minister of Trade and Industry, Michael Okyere Baafi.

Libya

In June 2021, a cooperation agreement was signed between IETO and the Libya African Business Council in Tunis. The agreement focuses on cooperation in the field of IT, Healthcare and academic institutes.

Lesotho

In June 2022, MOU was signed between Indian Economic Trade Organization and the High Commission of Lesotho in New Delhi represented by the foreign minister of Lesotho Matsepo Ramakoe and the high commissioner to India Lineo Irene Molise.

Gabon

In August 2022, The India Gabon Business Council was launched on the National Day of Gabon. MOU was signed between the Indian Economic Trade Organization and the Embassy of Gabon represented by the Charge D'Affaires Josephine Patricia Ntyam.

Zimbabwe

In 2021, An Indian Trade Organisation delegation visited Zimbabwe. The delegation was welcomed by Zimbabwe National Chamber of Commerce (ZNCC) and Zimbabwe India Trade Council. Vishal Nagesh is appointed as the vice chairman of the Zimbabwe India Trade Council. In May 2022, First Lady of Zimbabwe Dr. Auxillia Mnangagwa, visited India along with 23 member delegation on behalf of the Angel of Hope Foundation, she was received by IETO president Asif Iqbal, Amararam Gurjar, Director (East and South Africa Division) Ministry of External Affairs, Govt of India and the Ambassador of Zimbabwe to India Dr. Majoni Godfrey Chipare.
