= Philip Polewara =

Papua New Guinean military officer

Philip Polewara MBE
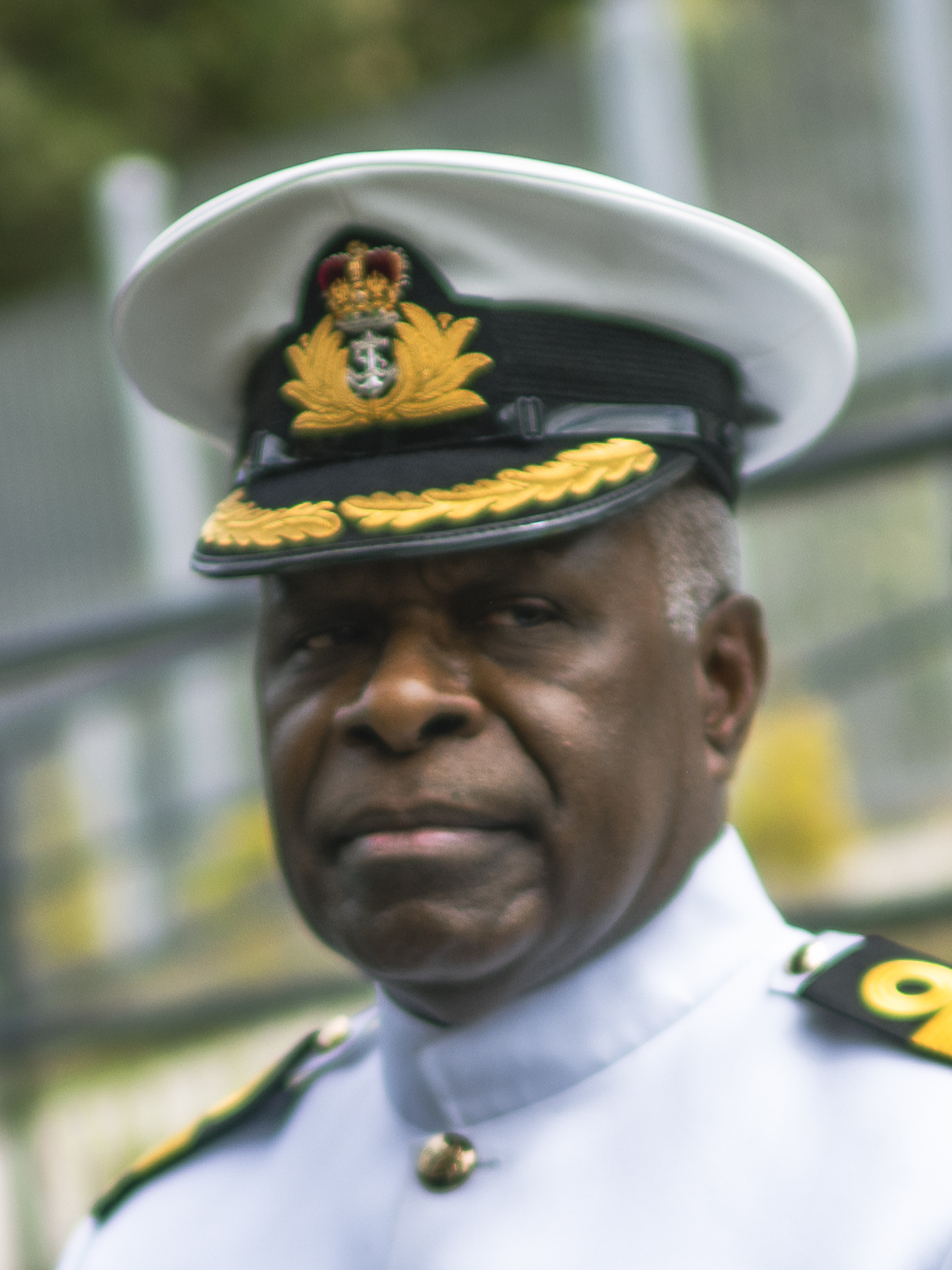
- Philip in 2023

Chief of the Papua New Guinea Defence Force
- Incumbent
- Assumed office June 10, 2024
- Prime Minister: James Marape
- Preceded by: Mark Goina

Commodore of the Papua New Guinea Defence Force
- In office 1988 – June 10, 2024

Personal details
- Citizenship: Papua New Guinea
- Education: University of Papua New Guinea; (BBus); Salve Regina University; (PhD)

Military service
- Years of service: 1988 - present
- Rank: Rear Admiral

Philip Polewara MBE is a Papua New Guinean military officer who currently serves as the chief of the Papua New Guinea Defence Force since June 2024. Prior to his appointment, he was commodore of the Defence force from 1988 until 2024.

He is ranked as the Rear Admiral in the Defence force. He previously served as the chief of staff captain in Bougainville in 2019. Polewara is a member of the Papua New Guinea Institute of Directors, where he serves since 2016.

== Education ==
Polewara went to the University of Papua New Guinea where he graduated with a Bachelor of Business. He is a graduate of the US Naval Staff College, the US Joint Forces Staff College, and the US Naval Command College. After graduating in 2013, he went to the Naval War College, where he served as an International Fellow. He earned a Master's degree and a PhD at Salve Regina University in 2023.

== Career ==
In March 2018, he was appointed as the chief of staff. During the 2024 Enga landslide, he released an assessment alongside other such as Billy Joseph. Philip was appointed as Chief in June 2024 by Prime Minister James Marape alongside being upgraded to rear admiral.

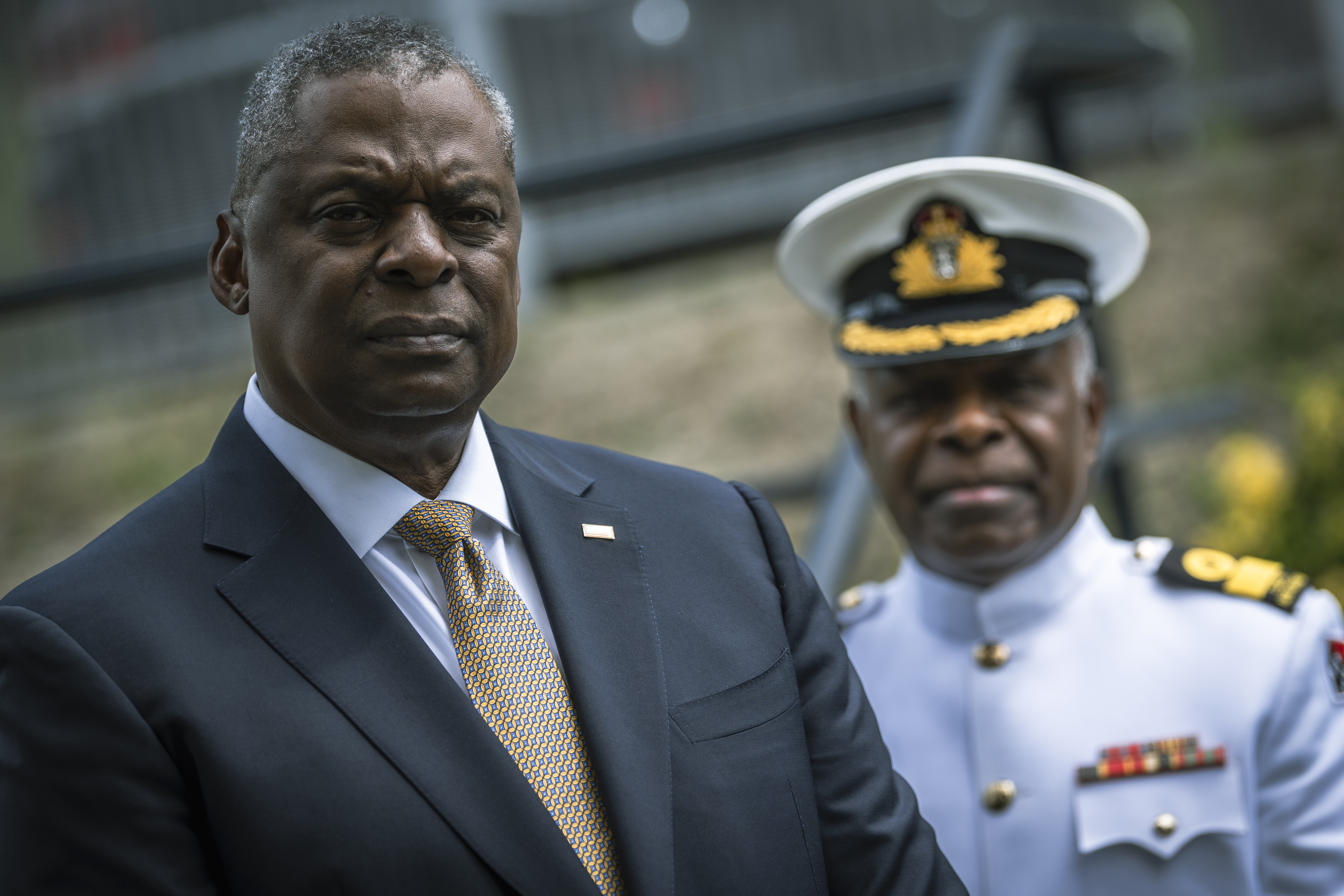
U.S. secretary of defense Austin (left) and Polewara (right) in July 2023

=== Foreign relations ===
In September 2024, he welcomed Pope Francis to Papua New Guinea. He farewelled the first adviser to India Edison Napyo in 2024.

=== United States ===
Polewara first met Vice Admiral Justin Jones at a airport alongside Defence Minister Win Bakri Daki in July 2023.

Polewara met Justin Jones in May 2025 at Port Moresby. They discussed better relations between United States and Papua New Guinea. During the same month, he visited the U.S with supporting new uniforms for the PNGDF.

== See also ==
- India-Papua New Guinea relations
- United States Navy
