= David Mantiziba =

Zimbabwean entrepreneur (born 1998)

- Born: February 16, 1998 (age 28); Harare, Zimbabwe
- Education: Chinhoyi University of Technology
- Occupation: Entrepreneur
- Known for: Founder of microfinance company Wildfin Financial Services

David Mantiziba (born 16 February 1998) is a Zimbabwean entrepreneur and the founder of microfinance company Wildfin Financial Services. He is also Chairman of Skipwide Group of Companies and a Member of Forbes Business Council.

== Early life and education ==
David Mantiziba was born on 16 February 1998 at Mbuya Maria Maternity Unit in Harare. He grew up in Borrowdale, Harare. Mantiziba had his early education at Zimre Primary School then proceeded to Goromonzi High School and High Achievers Coach International for his high school. In 2017 he attained a degree in accounting at Chinhoyi University of Technology.

== Career ==
David Mantiziba started his journey as an entrepreneur in 2020 when he founded Wildfin Financial Services and became the youngest CEO of a fast-growing licensed financial institution recorded by the Reserve Bank of Zimbabwe. Wildfin was the first fintech financial institution in Zimbabwe to offer instant credit lines. The company also has operations in Zambia.

Mantiziba also sits as the Chairman of Skipwide Group of Companies, a group with a diverse portfolio which includes real estate, automotive and software development through which he acquired a UK tech franchise called Eazi Apps in 2020 as a sole operator in South Africa and Zimbabwe.

He was made an official member of Forbes Business Council in 2025.

== Recognition ==
- Young CEO of the year 2023 (Institute of Corporate Directors)
- 40 under 40 most influential business people in Zimbabwe (Institute of Corporate Directors)
- Young Entrepreneur of the year (Zimbabwe National Chamber of Commerce)
- Winner of the 50 under 40 Leading African Investors 2024 (Africa Investment Leaders Forum)
- 100 Leading Investors in Africa 2025 (Africa Investment Leaders Forum)
- Recognised as a fasted growing brand in Africa 2025 (Emerging Brands Africa Awards)
- 100 Most Influential Global Leaders (Pan African Youth)
- 40 under 40 Africa
- Young African CEO of the Year 2025 (Africa CEO summit)
