= Tinashe Manzungu =

Zimbabwean businessman (born 1985)

- Born: 27 October 1985 (age 39); Kwekwe, Zimbabwe
- Occupation: Businessman
- Years active: 2010–present
- Organization(s): Zimbuild, Clientsure

Tinashe Manzungu (born 27 October 1985) is a Zimbabwean businessman. He is a former president of the Zimbabwe National Chamber of Commerce, co-founder and CEO of Zimbuild Property Investments, and chairman of TM Group. Manzungu is also the Africa Business Council board director.

== Life and career ==
Manzungu was born in Kwekwe, Zimbabwe, on 27 October 1985. As an entrepreneur, he has interests in construction, financial services, and insurance. In 2020, he was appointed president of the Zimbabwe National Chamber of Commerce and subsequently reappointed in 2021. He sits on the COMESA business council and on the Africa Business Council.

In 2023, he was recognised at the Leaders Without Borders annual business summit, and a year later, he was selected among the group's Top 100 Influential Global Voices.

In 2024, he was appointed president of the Zimbabwe Building Contractors Association.

== Positions ==
- Midlands State University – (former council member)
- Zimbabwe Building Contractors Association – senior vice president
- Zimbabwe Association of Microfinance Institutions (board member)
- ZIMCARE Trust (board chair)
- African Business Council (board director)
- Zimbabwe National Chamber of Commerce (former president)
- COMESA Business Council (board director)

== Selected awards ==
- Magafest Business Awards 2017 – CEO of the year
- Magafest Business Awards 2017 – Industrialist of the year
- 100 Most Influential Young Zimbabweans Under 40 of 2018
- Megafest Top 20 Outstanding Man in Business 2019
- Magafest Business Awards 2020 – Businessman of the Year 2020
- African Achievers Awards 2023 – Excellence in Leadership
- African Achievers Awards 2023 – Global Corporate Enterprise in Africa
