= School of Social Work (Harare) =

College campus in Harare, Zimbabwe

School of Social Work, Zimbabwe
- Established: 1963 type = General college
- Location: Harare, Harare Province, Zimbabwe
- Campus: Urban
- Affiliations: Midlands State University
- Website: https://ww5.msu.ac.zw/home/faculties/social-sciences/school-of-social-work/

School of Social Work, Zimbabwe, is a college campus in Harare, Zimbabwe. It offers undergraduate and postgraduate courses in social work. It is a department of the Midlands State University, Zimbabwe Midlands State University.

The college was founded in 1963, although some say 1964.

== Courses ==
- Bachelor Of Science Social Work
- Master of Science in Social Work
- Postgraduate Diploma in Social Work
- Certificate in Social Work
