= National Council for Higher Education =

National Council for Higher Education may refer to:

- Uganda National Council for Higher Education
- National Council for Higher Education, Zimbabwe
