= Mai Musodzi =

- Born: 1885; Harare, Zimbabwe
- Died: 21 July 1952
- Citizenship: Zimbabwean
- Occupation: Social worker

Elizabeth Maria "Mai" Musodzi Ayema MBE (born Musodzi Chibhaga, c. 1885–1952) was a Zimbabwean feminist and social worker from Salisbury.

== Biography ==
Musodzi Chibhaga was born around 1885 near Salisbury (now Harare) in the upper Mazowe valley to parents Chibhaga and Mazviwana. Her aunt was Shona spiritual leader Nehanda Nyakasikana. She and her siblings were orphaned following the 1896–1897 anti-colonial rebellions against the British South Africa Company. They then lived with their uncle at the Jesuit mission Chishawasha. Musodzi was baptised Elizabeth Maria in 1907. She married Zambian BSA police sergeant Frank Kashimbo Ayema in 1908.

Musodzi helped found the Harare African Women's Club in 1938. She led the organisation, which provided mutual aid, offered services and classes for women, and lobbied for a maternity clinic staffed by Red Cross-trained women. Musodzi also supported women's rights in her roles on the Native Advisory Board and the National Welfare Society's African committee. She worked against the eviction and arbitrary arrests of women as well as humiliating examinations for sexually transmitted infections. In the 1940s she formed the sodality group Chita chaMaria Hosi yeDenga (The sodality of Mary Queen of Heaven) with Berita Charlie and Sabina Maponga. She was the leader of the group and earned the appellation Mai (Mother).

In April 1947 Musodzi was awarded an MBE (Member of the Most Excellent Order of the British Empire) and was among select guests invited to dine at the Government House with Queen Elizabeth The Queen Mother and the royal family. During the royal dinner, she refused to sit at the table reserved for African notables, instead finding her seat on the floor.

Musodzi died on 21 July 1952. Salisbury Location's Recreation Hall in Mbare was renamed Mai Musodzi Hall in her honour. Historian Tsuneo Yoshikuni published the book Elizabeth Musodzi and the Birth of African Feminism in Early Colonial Africa in 2008.
