= Frederick Shava =

Zimbabwean politician

The Honourable Frederick Shava Sen.
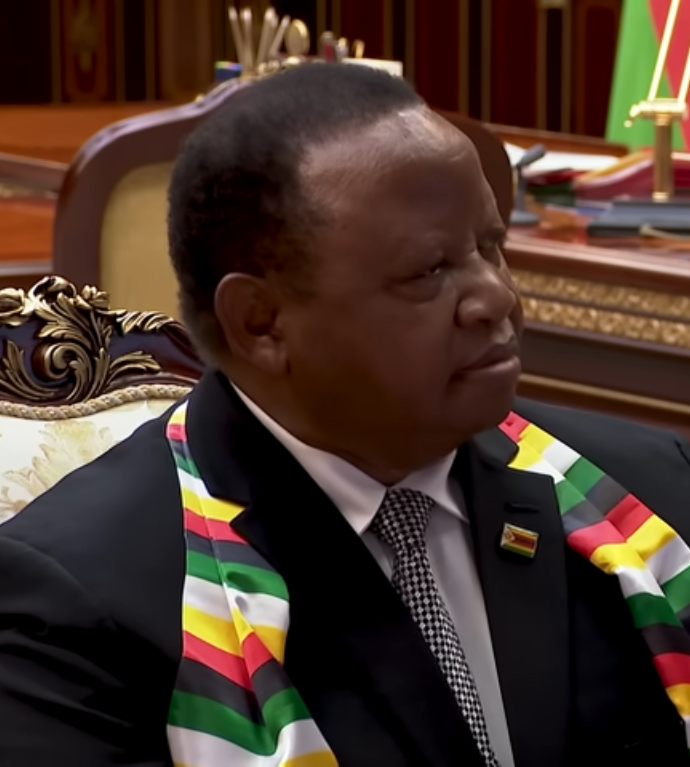

Minister of Higher and Tertiary Education, Innovation, Science and Technology Development
- Incumbent
- Assumed office 15 October 2024
- President: Emmerson Mnangagwa
- Deputy: Simelisizwe Sibanda
- Preceded by: Amon Murwira

Senator for Midlands
- Incumbent
- Assumed office 4 September 2023
- President: Emmerson Mnangagwa

Chairman of the SADC Council of Ministers
- In office 13 August 2024 – 12 August 2025
- President: Emmerson Mnangagwa
- Preceded by: Tete António
- Succeeded by: Rasata Rafaravavitafika

Minister of Foreign Affairs and International Trade
- In office 2 March 2021 – 15 October 2024
- President: Emmerson Mnangagwa
- Deputy: Sheillah Chikomo
- Preceded by: Sibusiso Moyo
- Succeeded by: Amon Murwira

Permanent Representative of Zimbabwe to the United Nations
- In office 19 September 2014 – 8 February 2021
- President: Robert Mugabe; Emmerson Mnangagwa
- Preceded by: Chitsaka Chipaziwa
- Succeeded by: Albert Ranganai Chimbindi

Zimbabwean Ambassador to China
- In office 6 April 2007 – 19 September 2014
- President: Robert Mugabe
- Preceded by: Christopher Mutsvangwa
- Succeeded by: Paul Chikawa

Personal details
- Born: 20 March 1949 (age 77) Chivi, Cheteni Village, Southern Rhodesia
- Party: ZANU–PF
- Spouse: Beatrice Foya Shava
- Education: Royal Holloway College; Imperial College London

Frederick Musiiwa Makamure Shava (born 20 March 1949) is a Zimbabwean politician who was appointed Minister of Higher Education, Science and Technology on 15 October 2024. He was formerly the Minister of Foreign Affairs and International Trade from 2 March 2021 to 15 October 2024. He also serves as a member of the Senate representing Midlands Province, having been sworn in on 17 March 2021. He replaced the late Sibusiso Moyo in both the Senate and as foreign minister.

Prior to his cabinet appointments, Shava served as Zimbabwe's representative to the United Nations, where he was the President of the UN Economic and Social Affairs Council. Shava also served in Robert Mugabe's government as the Minister of Labour, Manpower Planning and Development from 1981 to 1986 and Minister of State for Political Affairs in 1987. While a cabinet minister in the Mugabe government, Shava was convicted for perjury in the Willowgate motor scandal, a matter for which he later received a presidential pardon. He also served as Zimbabwe's ambassador to China from 2007 to 2014. He became Council Chairperson of the Southern African Development Community in August 2024.

== Early life and education ==
Shava was born on 20 March 1949 in Chivi, in what was then the colony of Southern Rhodesia. He attended secondary school at St. Ignatius College in Chishawasha, and went on to earn a Bachelor of Science in biology from the University of Zambia or the University of Zimbabwe. He also holds a Master of Science in nematology from Imperial College London and a Master of Philosophy and Doctor of Philosophy, both in parasitology, from Royal Holloway College.

Allegations of Unauthorized Borrowing (2024)

In October 2024, Frederick Shava was implicated in a legal case concerning the unauthorized borrowing of public funds. A lawsuit filed by former opposition legislator Marvellous Kumalo accused Shava and Public Service, Labour and Social Welfare Minister July Moyo of violating the Public Finance Management Act (Treasury Instructions), 2019, and the Constitution. The allegations centered around borrowing funds from government-established programs, including the Sustainable Livelihoods Fund, the Child Welfare Fund, and the Older Persons Fund, without prior Treasury approval.

The High Court, presided over by Justice Gladys Mhuri, ruled that Shava and Moyo had acted unlawfully and breached public trust. The court ordered both ministers to reimburse the misappropriated funds within 90 days. Shava was specifically directed to repay amounts borrowed from the Industrial Training and Trade Testing Fund and the Skilled Manpower Trade Testing and Certification Fund.
