= Midlands State University =

University in Zimbabwe

- Former name: Gweru Teachers' College
- Motto: Our Hands, Our Minds, Our Destiny
- Type: Public
- Established: 2000
- Chairman: Doctor Engineer Caleb Makwiranzou
- Chancellor: Emmerson Mnangagwa ex officio as President of Zimbabwe
- Vice-Chancellor: Victor Ngonidzashe Muzvidziwa
- Students: 31,000
- Undergraduates: 28,000
- Postgraduates: 3,000
- Location: Senga, Gweru, Zvishavane, Harare, Midlands, Zimbabwe; 19.516°S 29.833°E
- Campus: Urban
- Colors: Gold and Sky Blue
- Nickname: MSU
- Website: www.msu.ac.zw

Midlands State University is a government owned university in Zimbabwe. The university has 10 faculties (Agriculture, Environment and Natural Resources; Arts and Humanities; Built Environment, Art and Design; Business Sciences; Education; Engineering and Geosciences; Law; Medicine and Health Sciences; Science and Technology; Social Sciences) offering a wide variety of courses and many specialist programmes. The university is accredited through the National Council for Higher Education, under the Ministry of Higher and Tertiary Education of Zimbabwe.

The main campus is located in Gweru the third largest city in Zimbabwe. The university adopted a multi campus system therefore it has a satellite campus in the mining town of Zvishavane and other campuses located in the city of Gweru. TelOne campus is the second popular campus after Main campus.

== History ==
The idea of a university in the Midlands Province dates back to the foundation of the National University of Science and Technology when Gweru, which was identified as a possible site for a second university campus in the country, lost its bid to Bulawayo. Two other opportunities to host institutions of higher learning (the Open University and the Catholic University) were also missed by the Midlands Province, when the two universities went to Harare. It was in the midst of such disappointments that two initiatives converged to give birth to what has since become the Midlands State University. The President R G Mugabe, on the nudging of the provincial political leadership of the Midlands, accepted the idea of a national university being built in the Midlands. This coincided with the then Ministry of Higher Education and Technology's policy of devolution, which was aimed at expanding access to higher education by converting teachers and technical colleges into degree granting institutions. It was through the process of devolution that beginning in 1998 Gweru Teachers College started to enrol students studying for the Bachelor of Commerce with Education and the Bachelor of Science with Education degrees offered by the University of Zimbabwe.

The Minister of Higher Education and Technology transformed the devolution project at Gweru into Zimbabwe's third state university by means of the State University in the Midlands Act of April 1999.

The new university, whose name was later changed to the Midlands State University, was to be housed at the Gweru Teachers College premises.

== Organisation ==
The titular head of the university is the Chancellor, who is the President of Zimbabwe. The university is governed by a University Council, comprising the university's chief officers, representatives of the Senate, staff and students, nominees of the Minister of Higher and Tertiary Education and representatives form various sectors of commerce and civil society. The chief executive of the university is the Vice-Chancellor, who is appointed by the Chancellor after consultation with the Minister of Higher and Tertiary Education and the University Council. The Vice-Chancellor is assisted by one or more Pro–Vice-Chancellors, appointed by the University Council with the approval of the Minister of Higher and Tertiary Education.

The academic authority of the university is vested in the Senate, comprising the university's chief officers, the deans of faculties, all full professors, the chairmen of departments and staff and student representatives. The university is divided into faculties, managed by an executive dean and governed by a Faculty Board comprising all professors and lecturers.

== Fully semesterised university ==
Midlands State University is a fully semestered and modularised University. Enrolment takes place twice a year, in March and in August. Modules offered at any level in a semester are available at the same level during the next semester. This arrangement gives an opportunity to those students who, at the end of a semester are required to 'carry' or 'repeat' failed modules to do so in the next semester.

Students enrolled at MSU study for four-year or five-year degree programmes spending their Third Level on Work Related Learning in industry and other work places. Work Related Learning is an approach to teaching and learning which requires a student to spend some time during the course of study on 'hands on' practical experience.

== Student life ==
Residences There is a large number of flats which house male and female students separately. Many of the flats are named after prominent anti-colonial patriots such as Kaguvi and Nehanda. In 2013, the university constructed new halls of residence so as to cope with the increasing number of undergraduates. MSU is also currently constructing Halls of residence at its Telone Campus, and these are the most expensive and stylish hostels. The Batanai Campus has two hostels namely Rutendo and Ruzivo. Below is a table of all hostels and their locations:

Halls of Residence
Campus Location	Hostel	Gender	Occupants/Room
Batanai Campus	Rutendo	Female	2
Batanai Campus	Ruzivo	Female	1
Main Campus	Uhuru	Male	2
Main Campus	Dzapasi	Male	4
Main Campus	Magamba	Male	6
Main Campus	Runyararo	Female	2
Main Campus	Wadzanai	Female	2
Main Campus	Rufaro	Male	2
Main Campus	Nyadzonya	Male	2
Main Campus	Rusununguko	Male	2
Main Campus	Kaguvi	Female	2
Main Campus	Nehanda	Female	2
Main Campus	China	Female	5
Main Campus	Japan	Male	5

These hostels, however cannot accommodate all students and may not be preferred or afforded by all students therefore a lot of students are accommodated in close neighbourhoods that include Senga, KMP, Nehosho, Windsor Park, Daylesford, Kopje and Gweru East.

== Campuses ==
Midlands State University has many campuses and these include

- Main Campus in Gweru
- Telone Campus which accommodates the Business and Law students in Gweru
- Batanai Campus which accommodates the School of Tourism and Hospitality studies in Gweru
- Harare Campus in Harare
- Kwekwe Campus in Kwekwe.
- Zvishavane Campus in the mining town of Zvishavane
