= Anthony Watsham =

British entomologist

Anthony Watsham (Jesuit)
- Born: 30 April 1924; Aylesbury, England
- Died: 17 January 2019 (aged 94); Harare, Zimbabwe
- Occupations: Jesuit priest, teacher
- Years active: 1967-2019
- Known for: Entomologist
- Notable work: 123 drawings and watercolors of Scelionidae

Anthony Watsham FRES (30 April 1924 – 17 January 2019) was a member of the Society of Jesus, a Catholic priest, and a noted entomologist. He spent more time at St Ignatius College to the time he died. He was made an honorary lifetime member of the Entomological Society of Southern Africa in 2001, and was also a Fellow of the Royal Entomological Society in England.

== Life ==
Watsham was born in Aylesbury, England, on 30 April 1924. He studied architecture before joining the Royal Air Force and served in India during the Second World War. Upon his return to England in 1947 he entered the Jesuits, and was ordained a Catholic priest in 1958. From 1961 he taught at St. Aidian's College in Grahamstown, South Africa, and it was here that he began his study of scelionidae.

He joined the Jesuit Mission in Zimbabwe in 1967, teaching biology at Saint Ignatius College (Zimbabwe) and at Macheke. After his retirement from teaching in 1994 Warsham moved to the Convent at Macheke in eastern Zimbabwe and continued to study hymenoptera, while also painting African butterflies. He then moved to St Ignatius College Chishawasha where he spent the rest of his days.

He died at home in his sleep on 17 January 2019 in Harare, Zimbabwe.

== Entomologist ==
While at St. Ignatius College in the rural surroundings of Chishawasha near Harare, Zimbabwe, Watsham spent his spare time collecting, studying. drawing, and painting parasitic wasps. He also added to his collection during his travels to Namibia, South Africa, and Europe. Much of his collection is housed at the Natural History Museum, London, and at the South African National Collection of Insects in Pretoria, where hymenopterists from around the world use his research into the taxonomy and biology of the fig wasps associated with ficus thonningii. His book of drawings and watercolours of African chalcid wasps was published in 1996.

Watsham catalogued 123 species of scelionidae complete with drawings or watercolors. He was made a Fellow of the Royal Entomological Society, and kept in touch with those who benefited from his research: medical doctors, scientists, pharmacists, molecular specialists, research scientists, entomologists, and educators around the world. When he was made an honorary member of the Entomological Society of Southern Africa, mention was made of his "exquisite insect art."
