= Silveira House =

Jesuit centre in Zimbabwe

- Established: 1964; 62 years ago
- Purpose: Social justice and development
- Location: Chishawasha, Zimbabwe
- Director: Gibson Munyoro
- Affiliations: Jesuit, Catholic
- Website: silveirahouse.org.zw

Silveira House is a Jesuit centre for religious training and education located in Chishawasha, on the outskirts of Harare, Zimbabwe. Founded in 1964, it is named after Gonçalo da Silveira, the first Jesuit priest to come to Zimbabwe in the 16th century.

== History ==
Silveira was founded in 1964 by John Dove, who remained at Silveira House until 1984.

In the late 1960s and 1970s, Silveira House became a centre for trade union education and political organizing. With the establishment of Zimbabwe as an independent nation in 1980 and new opportunities for the black majority, Silveira continued its programs in civic education for political participation, and in skills training, agriculture, and community building. With the economic woes of the 1990s, Silveira launched programs in peacebuilding, lobbying, and advocacy, and increased its technical training capacity.

In 2018 Silveira House organized an indaba for the 23 Zimbabwean presidential candidates.

== See also ==
- List of Jesuit sites
