= Victor Ngonidzashe Muzvidziwa =

Zimbabwean anthropologist

Professor Victor Ngonidzashe Muzvidziwa is the current Vice Chancellor of Midlands State University in Zimbabwe. He is an anthropologist trained at the University of Waikato, New Zealand. His other qualifications, BA and MA, are from the University of Zimbabwe.

== Career ==
Muzvidziwa is a career academic whose journey in higher and tertiary education began in 1983 as a Teaching Assistant at the University of Zimbabwe. He subsequently chaired his department, before being promoted to be Dean of the Faculty of Social Sciences at University of Zimbabwe. He went on to hold the same position at University of Swaziland. He returned to his home country after being promoted as Pro-Vice Chancellor at University of Zimbabwe. He then moved to Midlands State University where he became an understudy of the founding vice chancellor Professor Ngwabi Bhebhe who was facing retirement.

== Research ==
His research encompasses a wide range of interests including: livelihood studies, gender, marriage, migration, and housing.
