= Sheillah Chikomo =

Zimbabwean politician

The Hon. Sheillah Chikomo MP

Deputy Minister of Foreign Affairs and International Trade
- Incumbent
- Assumed office 3 February 2024
- President: Emmerson Mnangagwa
- Minister: Frederick Shava; Amon Murwira
- Preceded by: David Musabayana

Member of Parliament for Mwenezi East
- Incumbent
- Assumed office 4 September 2023
- President: Emmerson Mnangagwa
- Preceded by: Joosbi Omar
- Constituency: Mwenezi East
- Majority: 15,322 (80.0%)

Personal details
- Born: September 18, 1990 (age 35) Triangle, Zimbabwe
- Party: ZANU-PF
- Education: Monash University

Sheillah Chikomo is a Zimbabwean politician. She is the current Deputy Minister of Foreign Affairs of Zimbabwe and a member of parliament. She is the member of ZANU–PF.
