= St. Ignatius College, Zimbabwe =

St. Ignatius College

Location
- Chishawasha, Mashonaland East Province; Zimbabwe
- 17°47′20″S 31°13′38″E

Information
- Type: Private secondary boarding school
- Motto: Latin: Ignem Mittite In Terram (Set The World on Fire)
- Religious affiliation: Catholicism
- Denomination: Jesuit
- Patron saint: Ignatius Loyola
- Established: 1962; 64 years ago
- Sister school: St Dominic's Chishawasha
- Rector: Prof Fr Lawrence Daka S.J
- Headmaster: Hamilton Maganga
- Chaplain: Fr Jose Julio S.J.(Br George Chanda S.J Acting chaplain)
- Gender: Boys: Form 1 to 4; Co-educational: Form 5 to 6 and A-levels
- Age: 12 to 18
- Enrolment: 455
- Student to teacher ratio: 1:36
- Houses: Kagwa; Lwanga; Mkasa
- Colors: Green and yellow
- Slogan: Ignem Mittite In Terram
- Sports: Rugby Basketball Soccer Hockey Volleyball Cricket Swimming Tennis Netball
- Mascot: Hound
- Nickname: GINA
- Teams: Hounds Hilltop Saints Leopards Jumpers
- Rival: Kutama College
- Website: www.stignatiuscollege.ac.zw

St. Ignatius College is a private Catholic secondary boarding school, located at Chishawasha, near Harare, in the Mashonaland East Province of Zimbabwe. The school was founded by the Society of Jesus in 1962 as the brother institution for St. George's College, Harare.

From 1962 to 1971 the school was an all-male school; until the nuns of Congregation Jesu helped bring female scholars only for Advanced Level. The College's sister school is nearby St Dominic's Chishawasha which meets frequently for social and co-curricula events. In its 59 years of inception it has garnered a name as the hub of profound education maintaining a hold within the top ten list of the national examinations. It linked to St Ignatius' College in England in its founding and has continuing links to St Augustine, Edinburgh, and Boston College, Massachusetts. The school's traditional rival is Kutama College.

It became a private institution in January 2020. (resm 2020)

== History ==
St. Ignatius College was founded by the Jesuit Fathers after they had seen the need to educate marginalised black students. According to Sister Stephanie, IBVM, (a founding member of Mary Ward House) the black community faced a number of challenges due to the draconian policies of the colonial racist regime. The college was meant to cater for the educational needs of the marginalised black people.

The first building to be constructed was the administration block in 1961 which housed the Jesuits before the construction of the Community House later in 1967. The next buildings to be constructed were the ZJC Block and Junior House. In 1967 the St. Ignatius College Chapel was constructed.

In 2013 St. Ignatius College placed sixth nationally in O-levels with a 95.95% pass rate. There is a scramble to get into the 6th form at St. Ignatius, as many of the top students in the nation apply. There are various exercises the boys participate in to exemplify the Jesuit goal of training men and women for others.

== Notables ==
Sister Stephanie helped establish Mary Ward in 1967 and remained teaching at St. Ignatius for over 40 years. At the start, French and Latin were taught and clubs included drama, canoeing, and Boy Scouts.

Long-standing teachers include Fr. Gregory Xavier Croft, S.J., who developed science education throughout Zimbabwe. He co-authored Science for Zimbabwe, one of the first science textbooks written after independence in 1980. He retired from Ignatius in 1991 but continued teaching physics at St. Alberts in Mount Darwin, Zimbabwe, and St. Boniface in Magunje. He died peacefully in Garnet House, Harare, in 2000.

Fr. Anthony Watsham, S.J., was a biology teacher and world authority in entomology. He spent much of his free time in the company of animals, dogs, birds, and a baboon named 'Bibiana'. A painter of great imagination, he decorated the Jesuit house at St. Ignatius with abstract art. One of his greatest academic achievements was the study and documentation of the parasitic wasps that live inside figs. He was awarded an honorary life membership of the Entomological Society of Southern Africa and became a Fellow of the Royal Society in London.

== Notable alumni ==
- Godfrey Chidyausiku – former Chief Justice of Zimbabwe
- Frederick Shava – senator and cabinet minister
- Petina Gappah – lawyer and writer

== See also ==
- Catholic Church in Zimbabwe
- Education in Zimbabwe
- List of Jesuit schools
- List of schools in Zimbabwe
