= Ministry of Foreign Affairs and International Trade (Zimbabwe) =

Government ministry of Zimbabwe

- Logo of the ministry

Ministry overview
- Formed: 18 April 1980
- Jurisdiction: Government of Zimbabwe
- Headquarters: 4240 Munhumutapa Building Samora Machel Avenue / Sam Nujoma Street, Harare; 17.82638826703024°S 31.050928143542137°E
- Minister responsible: Amon Murwira, Minister of Foreign Affairs and International Trade
- Deputy Minister responsible: Sheillah Chikomo, Deputy Minister of Foreign Affairs and International Trade
- Ministry executive: Albert Ranganai Chimbindi, Secretary
- Website: www.zimfa.gov.zw

The Ministry of Foreign Affairs and International Trade of the Republic of Zimbabwe is a cabinet ministry of Zimbabwe, responsible for conducting foreign relations of the country.

The current Minister of Foreign Affairs and International Trade is Amon Murwira. He was appointed by President of Zimbabwe, Emmerson Mnangagwa, being sworn in on 15 October 2024, replacing Frederick Shava.

== Color key ==
Political parties

United Federal Party
Rhodesian Front
United African National Council
ZANU–PF

Other factions

Independent

== List of ministers ==
The following is a list of Foreign Ministers of Zimbabwe and its historical antecedents since 1953:

No.	Portrait	Name (Birth–Death)	Term of office	Title
Federation of Rhodesia and Nyasaland (1953–1963)
1		Sir Godfrey Huggins (1883–1971)	7 September 1953 – 18 December 1953	Minister of External Affairs and Defence
1		Sir Godfrey Huggins (1883–1971)	18 December 1953 – 2 November 1956	Minister of External Affairs
2		Sir Roy Welensky (1907–1991)	2 November 1956 – 31 December 1963	Minister of External Affairs
Southern Rhodesia (1964–1965)
1		Winston Field (1904–1969)	1 January 1964 – 14 April 1964	Minister of External Affairs and Defence
2		Ian Smith (1919–2007)	14 April 1964 – 8 May 1964	Minister of External Affairs and Defence
2		Ian Smith (1919–2007)	8 May 1964 – 28 August 1964	Minister of External Affairs
3		Clifford Dupont (1905–1978)	28 August 1964 – 17 November 1965	Minister of External Affairs
Rhodesia (1965–1979, an unrecognised state)
—		Ian Smith (1919–2007); Acting	17 November 1965 – 1966	Minister of Foreign Affairs
4		The Duke of Montrose (1907–1992)	31 December 1966 – 11 September 1968	Minister of Foreign Affairs
5		Jack Howman (1919–2000)	September 1968 – 31 July 1974	Minister of Foreign Affairs
6		P. K. van der Byl (1923–1999)	2 August 1974 – 1 June 1979	Minister of Foreign Affairs
Zimbabwe Rhodesia (1979, an unrecognised state)
1		David Mukome (c. 1942–2020)	1 June 1979 – 11 December 1979	Minister of Foreign Affairs
Zimbabwe (since 1980, a recognised state)
1		Simon Muzenda (1922–2003)	18 April 1980 – 1 January 1981	Minister of Foreign Affairs
2		Witness Mangwende (1946–2005)	1 January 1981 – 22 December 1987	Minister of Foreign Affairs
3		Nathan Shamuyarira (1928–2014)	22 December 1987 – 15 March 1995	Minister of Foreign Affairs
4		Stan Mudenge (1941–2012)	15 April 1995 – 14 April 2005	Minister of Foreign Affairs
5		Simbarashe Mumbengegwi (born 1945)	15 April 2005 – 9 October 2017	Minister of Foreign Affairs
6		Walter Mzembi (born 1964)	9 October 2017 – 27 November 2017	Minister of Foreign Affairs
—		Simbarashe Mumbengegwi (born 1945); Acting	27 November 2017 – 30 November 2017	Minister of Foreign Affairs
7		Sibusiso Moyo (1960–2021)	30 November 2017 – 20 January 2021	Minister of Foreign Affairs and International Trade
—		Amon Murwira (born 1970); Acting	20 January 2021 – 2 March 2021	Minister of Foreign Affairs and International Trade
8		Frederick Shava (born 1949)	2 March 2021 – 15 October 2024	Minister of Foreign Affairs and International Trade
8		Amon Murwira (born 1970)	15 October 2024 – present	Minister of Foreign Affairs and International Trade

== See also ==
- Ministry of External Affairs (Rhodesia)
