= Gladys Mhuri =

Gladys Mhuri is a Zimbabwean lawyer and jurist. She was sworn in as a judge of the High Court of Zimbabwe on 13 July 2021 by Deputy Chief Justice Elizabeth Gwaunza.

Prior to becoming a judge, Mhuri was director of public prosecutions, under the attorney-general of Zimbabwe. Mhuri's first judicial appointment was to the Labour Court, where she rose to be the Senior President, a position which she held for more than ten years.

== Landmark cases ==
=== High Court ===
- 2024 Justice Gladys Mhuri ordered Public Service, Labour and Social Welfare Minister July Moyo and Higher and Tertiary Education, Innovation, Science and Technology Development Minister Frederick Shava to reimburse the various funds from which they had illegally borrowed.

=== Labour Court ===
- 2014 On remand from the Supreme Court, Flexmail (Private) Ltd lost its attempt to pay workers in relatively valueless Zimbabwe currency. Judge Mhuri held that the workers must receive adequate compensation, as that was a time of hyperinflation in Zimbabwe currency, payment in dollars was required. The original trial in Labour Court in 2007 found Flexmail liable to pay illegally fired workers.
- 2017 Mhuri ruled in favor of workers who were fired without cause after the Zuva Petroleum judgment of 2015. The workers were entitled to reinstatement or payment of damages. Justice Mhuri ruled that the Labour Amendment Act (Number 5 of 2015) applies in retrospect to cover all those who lost their jobs from 17 July 2015, as it, inter alia, codified existing law as made clear by Section 18 of the Finance Act. The judgment affected thousands of workers.
- 2018 Judges Betty Chidziva and Gladys Mhuri ruled that the doctors' and nurses' strike was illegal in that they had not provided adequate notice to their employer, the Health Services Board (HSB). The HSB was allowed to dock salaries of all doctors and medical staff for the number of days they did not report for duty.
