= Simelisizwe Sibanda =

Zimbabwean politician

The Hon. Simelisizwe Sibanda MP

Deputy Minister of Higher and Tertiary Education, Innovation, Science and Technology Development
- Incumbent
- Assumed office 31 July 2024
- President: Emmerson Mnangagwa
- Minister: Amon Murwira; Frederick Shava
- Preceded by: Himself
- In office 14 September 2023 – 1 July 2024
- President: Emmerson Mnangagwa
- Minister: Amon Murwira
- Preceded by: Raymore Machingura
- Succeeded by: Himself

Member of Parliament for Bubi
- Incumbent
- Assumed office 4 September 2023
- President: Emmerson Mnangagwa
- Preceded by: Soury Key Mguni
- Constituency: Bubi
- Majority: 6,536 (35.3%)

Personal details
- Party: ZANU-PF

Simelisizwe Sibanda is a Zimbabwean politician. He was appointed Deputy Minister of Higher Education and Tertiary Education of Zimbabwe in September 2023. He is a member of parliament. He was fired on 1 July 2024 following allegations of mistreating a teacher on grounds of the teacher’s ethnicity. He is the member of ZANU–PF.
