= Kutama College =

Catholic high school in Norton, Zimbabwe

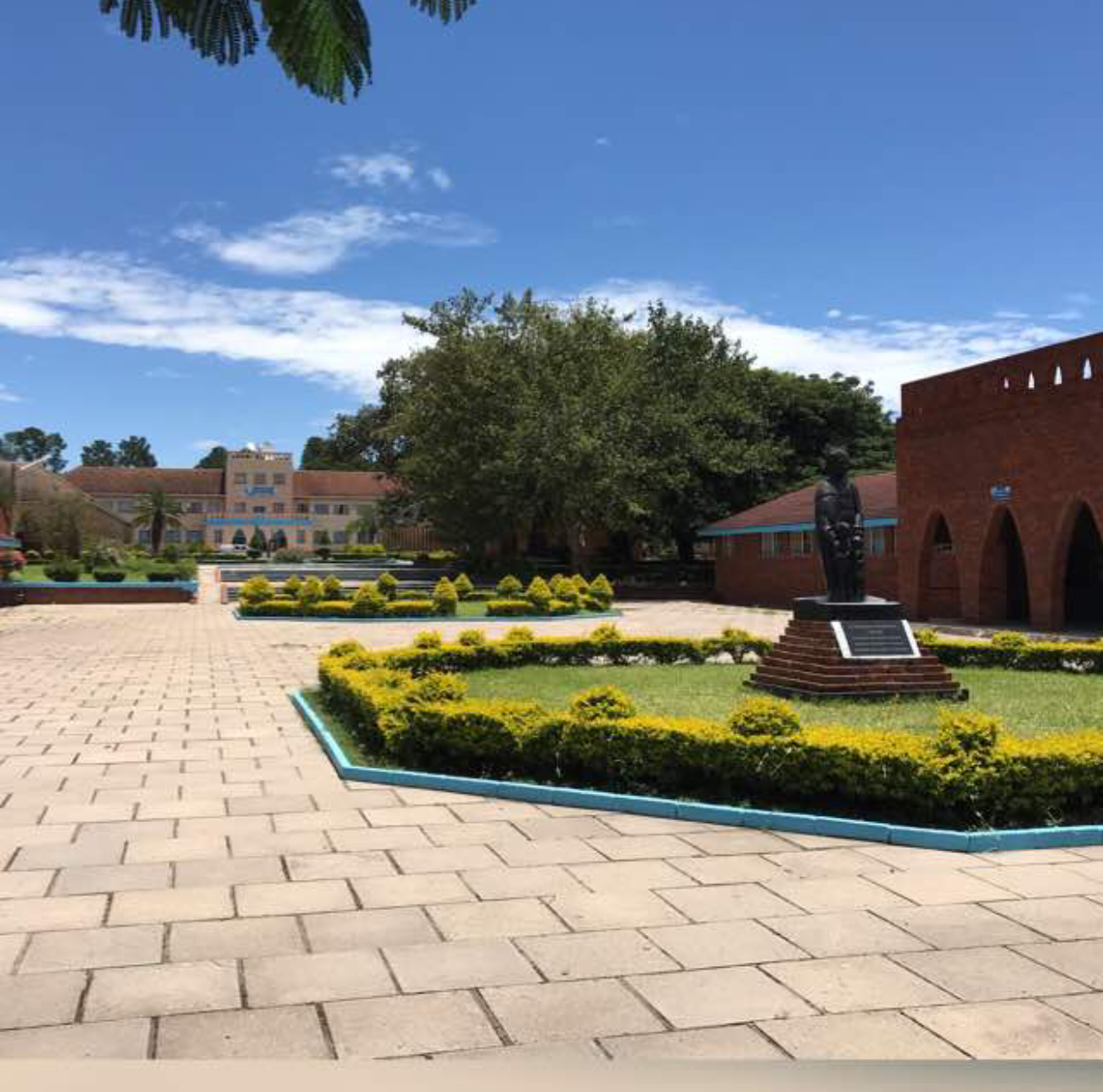

Location
- Private Bag 909 Norton; Mashonaland West About 80km by road from Harare Main post office Zimbabwe
- 17°48′24″S 30°23′10″E

Information
- Type: Private Catholic boarding high school
- Motto: Esse Quam Videri; (To be, rather than to seem / Be what You Are!)
- Established: 1914; 112 years ago
- Principal: Francis Mukoyi
- Grades: Form 1 – Upper Six
- Age: 12 to 18
- Enrollment: 450 -500 boys and girls.
- Colors: Blue; Gold
- Rival: St. Ignatius College, Zimbabwe
- Yearbook: Echo Chronicle
- Tuition: USD$2 500.00 per term (trimester system)
- Website: kutamacollege.ac.zw

Kutama College (officially St Francis Xavier's Kutama College) is a private Catholic boarding high school near Norton, Zimbabwe in the Zvimba area, 80 kilometres southwest of Harare. Grown out of a Mission station founded in 1914 and run by the Marist Brothers, Kutama has a student population of about 500 pupils. The institution was an all-boys school until 2024 when the first cohort of girls enrolled.

Kutama College is one of the largest top schools in Zimbabwe. Kutama College was ranked 26th out of the top 100 best high schools in Africa by Africa Almanac in 2017, based on quality of education, student engagement, strength and activities of alumni, school profile, internet and news visibility.

The school moto "Esse Quam Videri" is Latin meaning "to be, rather than to seem".

== History ==
Founded prior to the Second World War by English Jesuit Priests at the request of Bishop Aston Chichester, Kutama was one of the first institutions to offer high school education to students of African descent in colonial Rhodesia. Its Jesuit origins are reflected in its official name, St Francis Xavier College. The school is part of Kutama Mission, a Catholic mission originally run by Jesuits but now run by the Marist Brothers, a Catholic order devoted to educational work.

James A. Chinamasa, Kutama College Headmaster in the 1990s, with his wife.

The school's first headmaster was Father Jerome O'Hea, an Irish-born priest after whom the local mission hospital is named. Its most famous headmaster was James Anthony (affectionately known as "Jachi") Chinamasa, a Kutama College Old Boy (KOBA) and elder brother of Zimbabwean Justice Minister Patrick Chinamasa. The current headmaster is Mr Francis Mukoyi who took over from Br Jacob Mutingwende.

== Houses ==
Like most high schools in Zimbabwe, which follow the traditional British school system, students at Kutama are divided into four houses each having its own colour:

- Champagnat (Blue), named after the Saint Marcellin Champagnat, the founder of the Marist movement.
- Chichester (Red)
- Michael (Green)
- Patrick (Yellow)

== Notable alumni ==
- Bernard Chidzero – Zimbabwean economist, politician, writer (1927–2002) – Zimbabwe's second finance minister (1982–1995)
- James Chikerema – President of the Front for the Liberation of Zimbabwe (1925–2006)
- Elliot Manyika – Zimbabwean politician (1955–2008) – former Minister without portfolio
- Douglas Mombeshora – Zimbabwean politician
- Robert Mugabe – Leader of Zimbabwe from 1980 to 2017

== See also ==
- List of schools in Zimbabwe
- List of boarding schools
- List of Marist Brothers schools
- Association of Trust Schools
