= Papua New Guinea Defence Force ranks =

The Military ranks of Papua New Guinea are the military insignia used by the Papua New Guinea Defence Force. With its military originating from the Australian Army, Papua New Guinea shares a rank structure similar to that of Australia.

== Commissioned officer ranks ==
The rank insignia of commissioned officers.

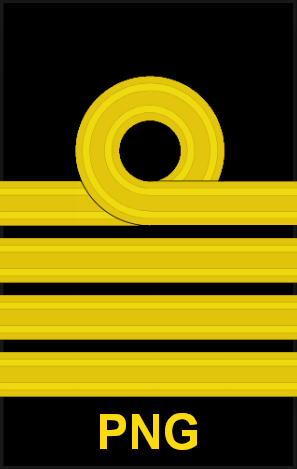
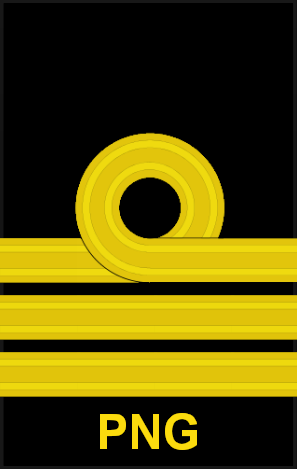
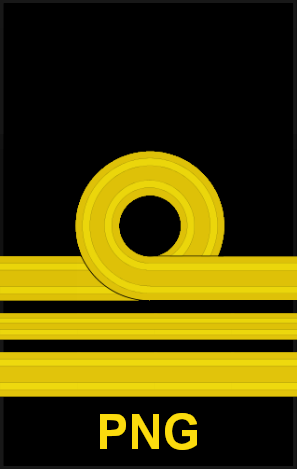
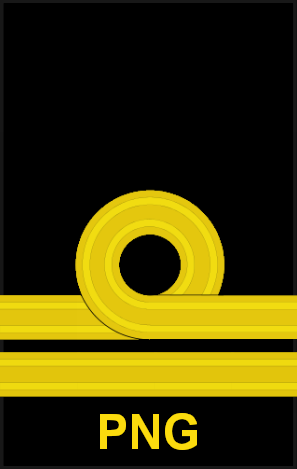
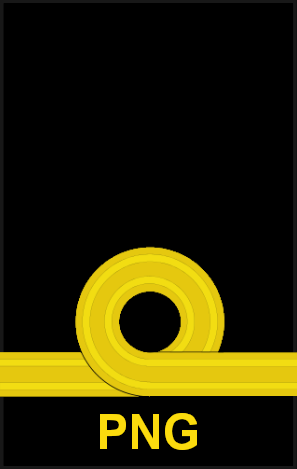
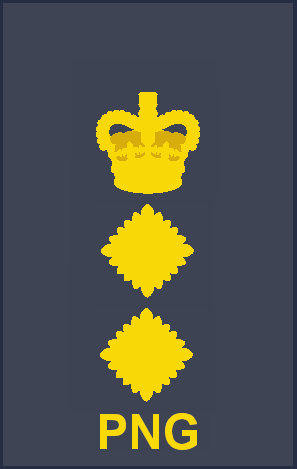
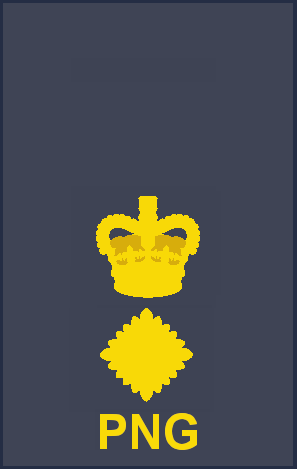
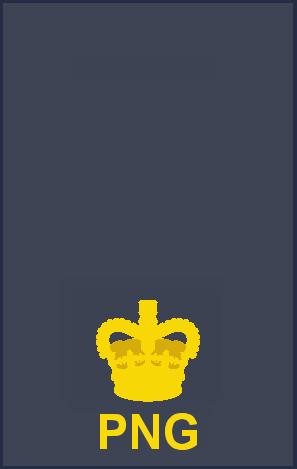
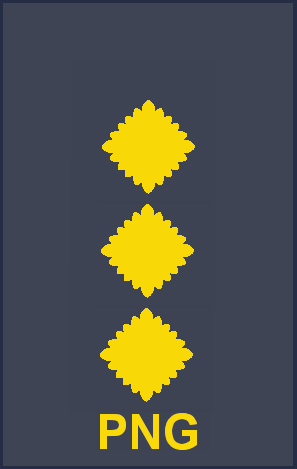
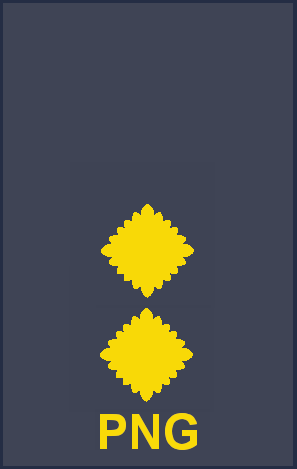
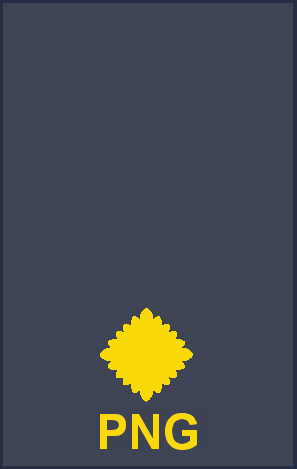
Rank group	General / flag officers		Senior officers			Junior officers
Papua New Guinea Land Element
Papua New Guinea Land Element	Major general	Brigadier general	Colonel	Lieutenant colonel	Major	Captain	First lieutenant	Second lieutenant
Papua New Guinea Land Element	Meja jeneral	Brigadia jeneral	Kolonel	Leftenan kolonel	Meja	Kepten	Leftenan	Namba tu leftenan
Papua New Guinea Maritime Element
Papua New Guinea Maritime Element	Rear Admiral	Commodore	Captain	Commander	Lieutenant; Commander	Lieutenant	Sub; Lieutenant
Papua New Guinea Air Element
Papua New Guinea Air Element			Colonel	Lieutenant colonel	Major	Captain	First lieutenant	Second lieutenant
Papua New Guinea Air Element			Kolonel	Leftenan kolonel	Meja	Kepten	Leftenan	Namba tu leftenan
Rank group	General / flag officers		Senior officers			Junior officers

== Other ranks ==
The rank insignia of non-commissioned officers and enlisted personnel.

Rank group	Senior NCOs				Junior NCOs		Enlisted
Papua New Guinea Land Element							No insignia
Papua New Guinea Land Element	Warrant officer class 1 ?	Warrant officer class 2 ?	Staff sergeant Plag Sajen	Sergeant; Sajen	Corporal; Kopul	Lance corporal Lans Kopul	Private; Praivet
Papua New Guinea Maritime Element								No insignia
Papua New Guinea Maritime Element	Warrant officer		Chief petty officer	Petty officer	Leading seaman		Able seaman	Seaman
Papua New Guinea Air Element							No insignia
Papua New Guinea Air Element	Warrant Officer Class 1	Warrant Officer Class 2	Staff Sergeant	Sergeant	Corporal	Lance Corporal	Private
Rank group	Senior NCOs				Junior NCOs		Enlisted
