= India–Papua New Guinea relations =

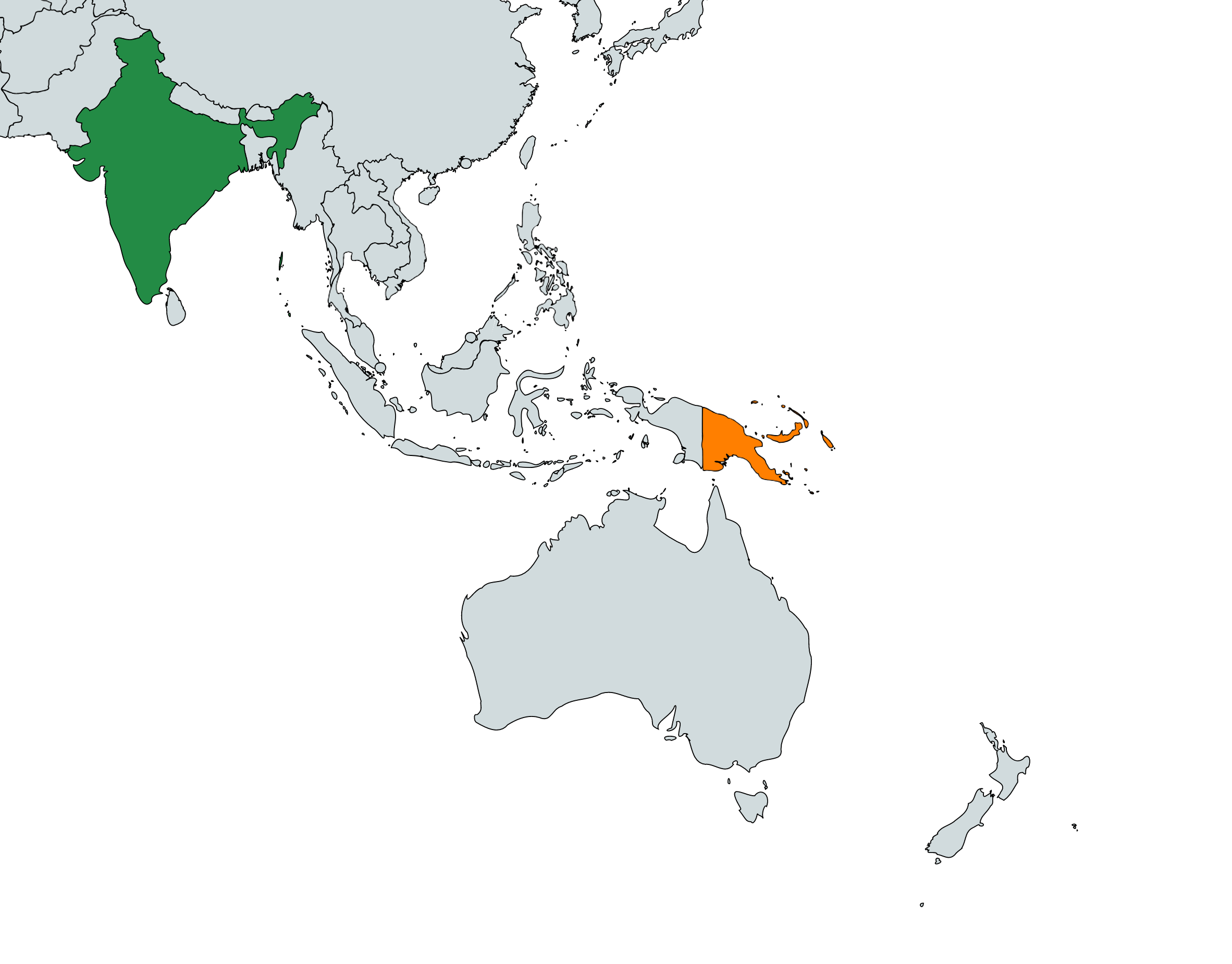
- India: Papua New Guinea

Diplomatic mission
- High Commission of India, Port Moresby: Embassy of Papua New Guinea, New Delhi

India and Papua New Guinea established diplomatic relations in 1975. Papua New Guinea has a High Commission in New Delhi, whilst India operates a High Commission in Port Moresby. Both countries are members of Commonwealth of Nations and the Non-Aligned Movement.

== History ==
Relations started in 1975 when PNG became independent from Australia and ever since relations have grown. India has been educating many PNG officers/students and many Indians live in Papua New Guinea serving in sectors such as IT, Education, Government and Trade.

== Trade ==
In 2010–11 fiscal year, Papua New Guinea-India trade reached US$239 Million.

In 2017, PNG and India entered an Economic Partnership Agreement with a focus on investments and infrastructure projects in Papua New Guinea to facilitate more trade with India.

The President of the IETO and India Africa Trade Council (IATC) Dr. Asif Iqbal and the India Pacific Trade Council organized the Launch of Papua New Guinea coffee in India with the High Commissioner of Papua New Guinea H.E Paulias Korni OBE and the Finance Minister of Tamil Nadu Palanivel Thiaga Rajan in Chennai with the Ministry of External Affairs Head of Secretariat Mr. Venkatachalam Murugan.

== See also ==
- Foreign relations of India
- Foreign relations of Papua New Guinea
