= St Dominic's Chishawasha =

Coordinates: 17.7929°S 31.2286°E

- Chishawasha; Zimbabwe

Information
- Type: Private, boarding school
- Motto: Veritas (Latin: Truth)
- Denomination: Catholic
- Opened: 1898
- Sister school: Saint Ignatius College
- Gender: Girls
- Enrollment: 420
- Website: DominicChishiawasha

St Dominic's Chishawasha is a Roman Catholic girls boarding school situated in Chishawasha valley, about 24 km from Harare, the capital of Zimbabwe. It began as an elementary school in 1898; the secondary school was opened in 1967. In 2017 the enrollment consisted of 420 full-time boarding students.

== History ==
St Dominic's was founded by the Sisters of the Dominican Order in 1896, and is still run by them. Besides traditional school subjects, sewing, cooking, technology, and business courses are taught. Since 2001 the school has offered A-levels. In 2013, 89 girls from the school took O-levels and 93.26% of these passed, which ranked ninth in the country.

The school was established as a sister school to St Ignatius College which is run by Jesuit priests. Together they produced a music album in 2017. The school is in the Chishawasha Mission parish of St. Ignatius Loyola.

The school motto is 'Veritas', which is a Latin term for truth, and is the motto of the Dominican Sisters. The school badge has a black and white crest which has the cross and the school motto Veritas on the top.

== Activities ==
Student clubs include taekwondo, karate, chess, drummies, mbira, traditional dance, LEO, drama, art, cheerleaders, and rosary group. Sports include basketball, volleyball, athletics, and soccer.

In 2016 the girls won first place among 17 schools in a choral competition.

== Notable alumni ==
- Petina Gappah, author
- Betty Makoni, gender activist
- Priscilla Misihairambwi-Mushonga, politician
- Zukiswa Wanner, author
- Divine Ndhlukula, Business woman

== See also ==
- List of schools in Zimbabwe
- List of boarding schools
