= Papua New Guinea Defence Force =

Military of Papua New Guinea

- Papua New Guinea Defence Force emblem
- Founded: 1973
- Service branches: Land Element; Maritime Element; Air Element
- Headquarters: Murray Barracks, Port Moresby
- Website: defence.gov.pg

Leadership
- The Minister for Defence: Elias Kapavore
- Commander of the PNGDF: Rear Admiral Philip Polewara

Personnel
- Military age: 20
- Conscription: No
- Active personnel: 4000 (2024 est.)

Expenditure
- Budget: $US113.1 million (2014)
- Percent of GDP: 1.9 (2014)

Related articles
- History: First World War; Asian and Pacific theatre of World War I; Battle of Bita Paka; Second World War; Pacific War; New Guinea campaign; Coconut War; Bougainville Civil War
- Ranks: Ranks

The Papua New Guinea Defence Force (PNGDF) is the military organisation responsible for the defence of Papua New Guinea. It originated from the Australian Army land forces of the territory of Papua New Guinea before independence, coming into being in January 1973 and having its antecedents in the Pacific Islands Regiment. The PNGDF is a small force, numbering around 3,600 personnel, and consists of a Land Element, an Air Element and a Maritime Element. It is a joint force tasked with defending Papua New Guinea and its territories against external attack, as well as having secondary functions including national-building and internal security tasks.

Defence accounts for less than 2% of GDP, while also receiving significant assistance and training support from Australia, New Zealand, the United States, and other nations.

The PNGDF Land Element includes two infantry battalions, an engineer battalion, a signal squadron, an Explosive Ordnance Disposal (EOD) unit, and a preventive medicine platoon. The Air Element is a small air wing operating three light transport aircraft and two leased helicopters. The Maritime Element consists of four Guardian-class patrol boats and two landing craft. The army is under the direct command of Headquarters PNGDF, while the air wing and navy have their own commanding officers. The PNGDF does not have a Commander-in-Chief but rather a Commander who advises the Minister for Defence. Allegiance is sworn to the King of Papua New Guinea, presently Charles III, and the realm of Papua New Guinea. The PNGDF is under the control of the National Executive Council through the Minister for Defence.

== History ==
The PNGDF originated from the Australian Army land forces of the Territory of Papua New Guinea before independence, coming into being in January 1973 and having its antecedents in the Pacific Islands Regiment. At independence it numbered 3,750 all ranks, while another 465 Australian personnel augmented the force to assist in training and technical support. In the mid-1990s, the PNG economy was in crisis with financial support provided by the World Bank and the International Monetary Fund (IMF) on the proviso of economic reform with the first phase in 1996 to include defence. Successive attempts to reduce the size of the PNGDF in response to the country's economic problems provoked fierce resistance. In 2000, the World Bank and the IMF provided loans with economic reform conditions and a Commonwealth Eminent Persons Group (CEPG) report recommended to government that the PNGDF strength be reduced by more than half. In March 2001, soldiers mutinied after learning the government had approved the CEPG report. The government capitulated after 10 days to the mutineers' demands, agreeing not to cut the army's strength. However, in 2002 it was announced that the PNGDF would be reduced from 4,000 to around 2,100 personnel. In early 2004 the government reaffirmed its commitment to implement cuts within the armed forces, with a definitive restructuring expected to take place. Chief of Staff Captain Aloysius Tom Ur told troops in January 2004 that the 2004 strength of 3,000 would be reduced by one-third, and that during 2004, the force's personnel branch would merge with the support branch into a new organisation. Ultimately the reduction-in-size target was reached in 2009.

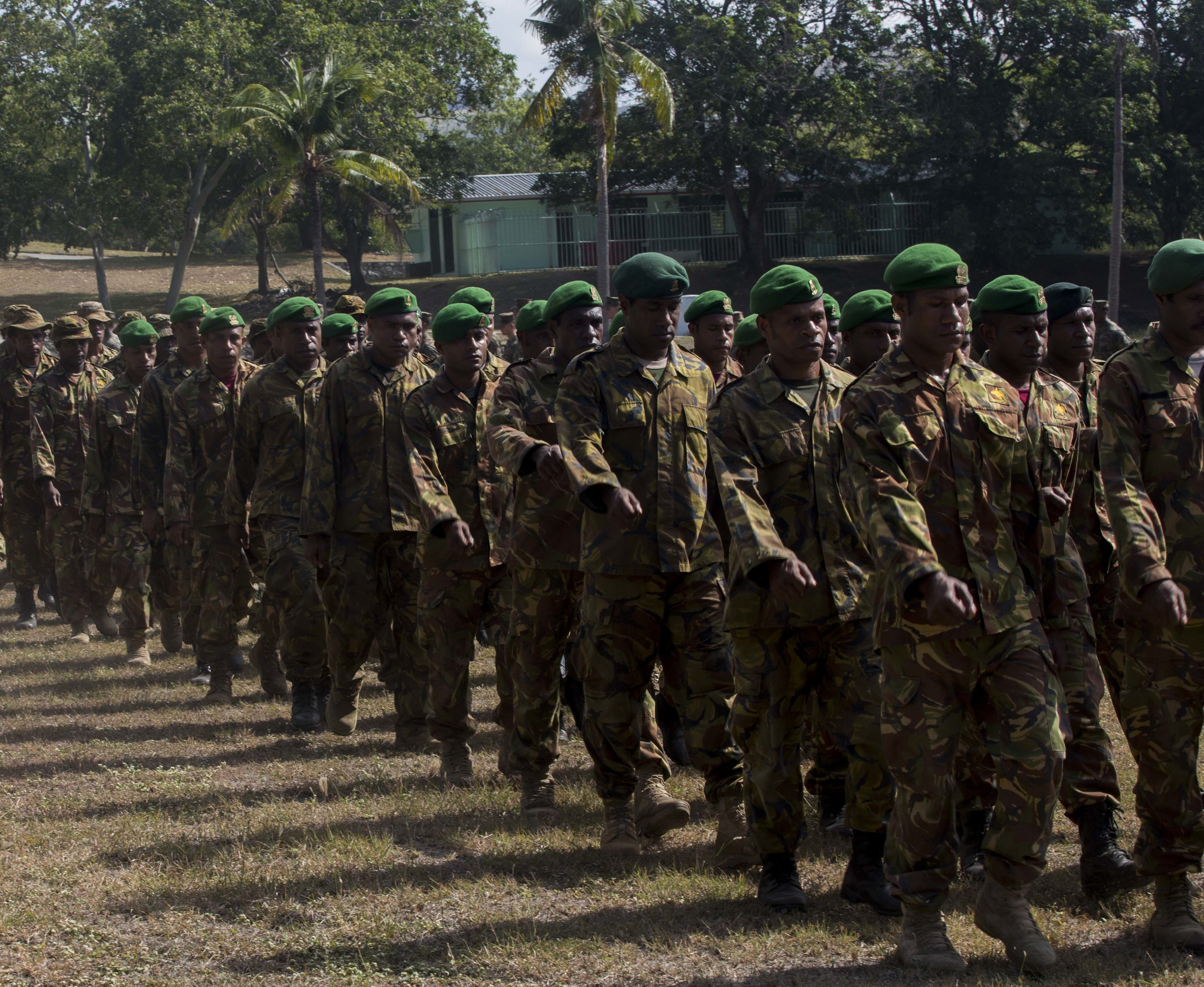
PNGDF soldiers at Taurama Barracks

PNGDF capability is considered modest, with the army facing significant problems including a chronic budget crisis, a lack of experience in conventional operations, limited ability to be deployed independently overseas as well as internal tensions. The air force and navy also suffer major equipment and funding shortfalls—to the point of sometimes almost being grounded—and are both too small and poorly equipped to take part in operations overseas. Indeed, the entire PNGDF is badly in need of new equipment. Australia, New Zealand, France and several other nations are assisting in the training and the professionalisation of the PNGDF, while others—including Germany and China—provide budgetary assistance. Australia's aid for the PNGDF is currently worth AUD9.2 million with an additional AUD40 million committed the reform programme. AUD20 million was committed initially, mainly for paying off redundant personnel. A second tranche of AUD20 million is for the refurbishment of barracks over five years (AUD5 million). As of January 2006 29 Australian defence personnel were engaged in training and advising in areas including policy, management, maritime, infantry, engineering, personnel, logistic and finance areas of assistance. Two more Australian personnel were seconded as advisers on logistics and personnel matters in August 2006, while an Australian bureaucrat from the Department of Defence is posted to the PNG defence department. "Australia is particularly interested in supporting Port Moresby in the areas of counter-terrorism, maritime patrols and defence organisation structures and procedures."

During its history the PNGDF has sent 400 troops to assist the Vanuatu government put down a secessionist revolt in 1980 and was called out in aid to the civil power in Port Moresby in 1983. It has also conducted operations against the OPM (Organisasi Papua Merdeka or Free Papua Movement), based in Irian Barat, and which had been involved fighting the Indonesian armed forces. From 1989 to 1997 the PNGDF was involved in fighting the secessionist Bougainville Revolutionary Army (BRA) on Bougainville and Buka. During these operations the PNGDF was criticised for its treatment of civilians, human rights violations and the use of mercenaries. More recently, following the passage of a constitutional amendment allowing the stationing of the PNGDF on foreign soil, 80 personnel joined the Australia-led Regional Assistance Mission to the Solomon Islands (RAMSI) in July 2003. As of 2008 PNGDF personnel remain in the Solomon Islands as part of the scaled down, rotational Pacific contingent.

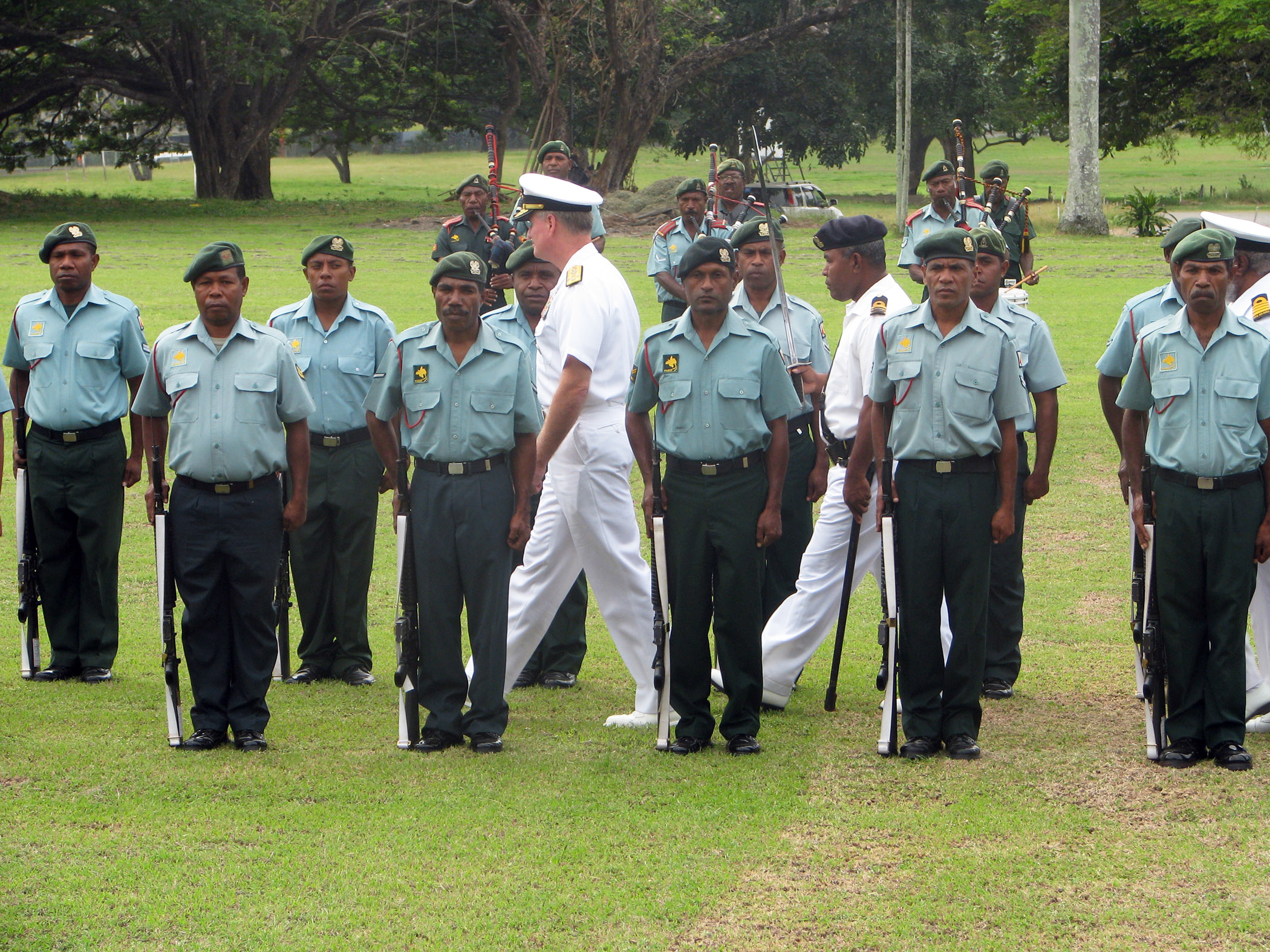
Admiral Patrick Walsh, commander of the U.S. Pacific Fleet, reviews a Papua New Guinea Defence Force Honor guard

Today, the PNGDF is a small force numbering around 2,100 personnel, and consisting of a Land Element, an Air Element and a Maritime Element. It is a joint force tasked with defending Papua New Guinea and its territories against external attack, as well as having secondary functions including national-building and internal security tasks. Defence accounts for up to 4% of government expenditure, while also receiving significant assistance and training support from Australia, New Zealand, the United States and other nations. The army is under the direct command of Headquarters PNGDF, while the air force and navy have their own commanding officers. The PNGDF is under the political oversight of the Minister for Defence.

On 26 January 2012, military personnel under the command of the retired officer Colonel Yaura Sasa purported to arrest the commander of the Papua New Guinea Defence Force, Brigadier General Francis Agwi. It was reported that former Prime Minister Sir Michael Somare had ordered the operation in relation to his attempts to regain the leadership of the country, and had offered to appoint Sasa the commander of the PNGDF.

In 2013, the Defence White Paper 2013 was released which called for the size of the PNGDF to be increased from 2,600 personnel to 5,000 personnel by 2017 back to the pre Reform Program level in 2002. Defence spending under the White Paper was to increase from 1.45% of GDP to 3% of GDP by 2017. The PNGDF was to be modernised under the White Paper with the Land Force to be reequipped with new weapons and equipment and vehicles, the Maritime Element was to acquire new vessels and the Air Element was to restore its fix wing fleet to flying status and acquire new aircraft. In 2017, the Post-Courier reported that the White Paper objectives to modernise and reequip the PNGDF had not been achieved as defence spending had remained the same due to economic challenges.

== Land Element ==
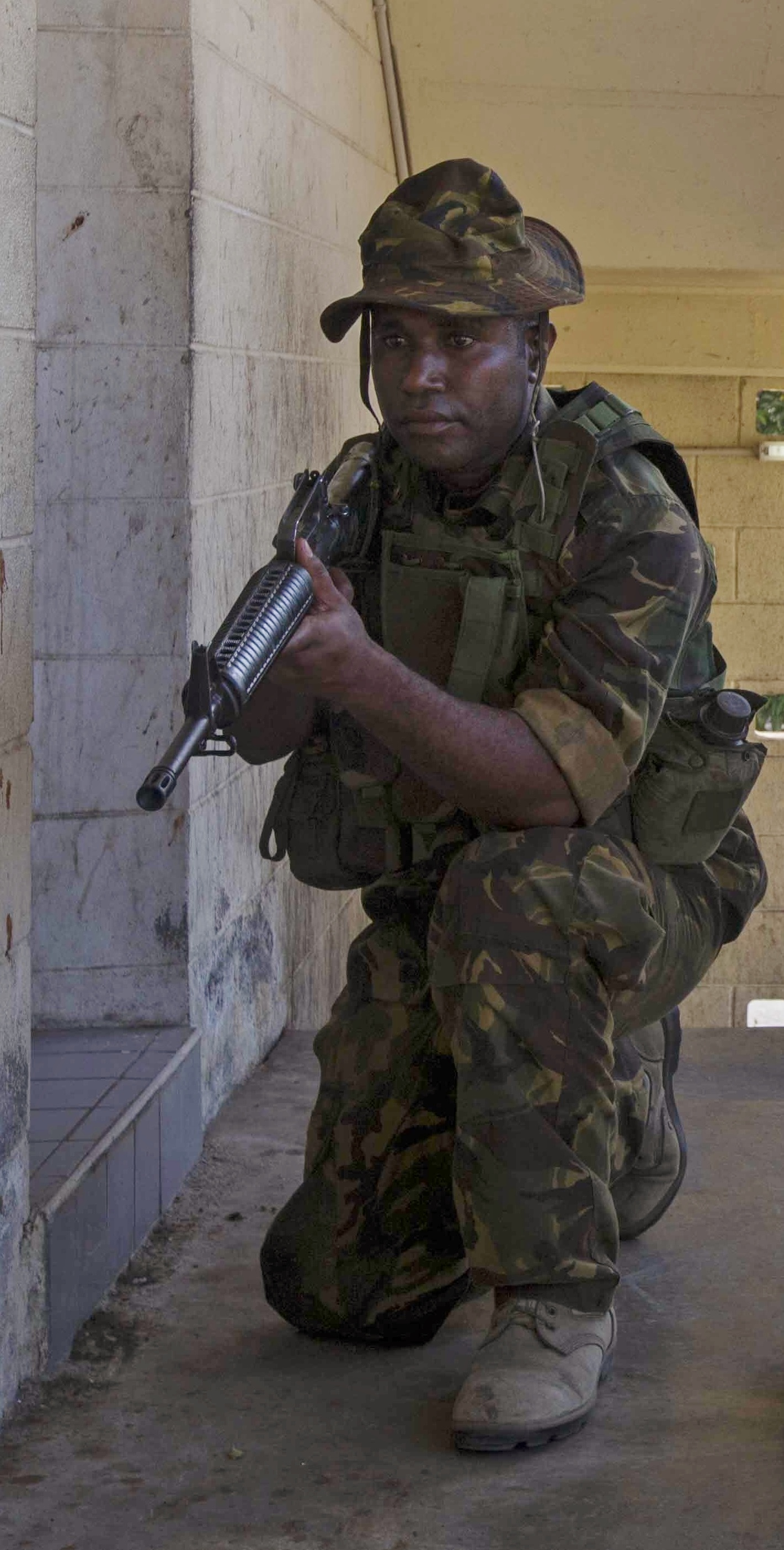
A PNGDF soldier in Kumul uniform with an M16 rifle

The Land Element is the PNGDFs army land force, being primarily a light infantry force capable of conducting low-tempo operations only; it is the senior of the three services. The army has its origins in the Royal Pacific Islands Regiment, which was formed in 1951 as a component of the Australian Army. Since independence, the army has become an indigenous organisation with its own traditions and culture. Nonetheless, the force has adopted foreign ideas on the roles and needs of an armed force, leading to proposals for armour, artillery and attack helicopters. However, the army faces severe budgetary problems and has therefore had virtually no money for operations, training, and maintenance or capital equipment upgrades. In this context, proposals to develop the army into a well equipped, mobile conventional land force, are unlikely in the near to medium term. The army's role is to protect against external aggression, provide for internal security in support of the police, and to carry out civic action and relief operations when required. The engineer battalion is used for civic action with construction and reticulation capabilities, while the two infantry battalions also constructs roads, bridges and other infrastructure in regions where commercial companies are unwilling to work for security reasons.

The army has no significant experience in conventional operations and according to Janes it has limited ability to deploy overseas independently; "it is not effective in internal security operations and has often shown scant regard for political authority. This was illustrated in August 2006 when the PNG government declared a state of emergency in the Southern Highlands province where a proposed gas pipeline has been planned. Troops were being deployed to restore law, order and good governance in the province. In these latter circumstances it has proven to be more of a threat to the state than an asset. For reasons of cultural diversity and rivalry, terrain and transport difficulties and the reduction and retaining of the smaller army—a successful army coup would be extremely unlikely."

During the 1990s the army's main role was internal security and counter-insurgency operations in Bougainville, where a secessionist movement was attempting to bring independence. This operation—which lasted at varying levels of intensity until 1997—revealed the army's ineffectiveness, lack of training and indiscipline. The army was accused of significant human rights violations and there were indications it was operating independently of the government. Indeed, in June 1991 Colonel L. Nuia was dismissed for killing civilians and using Australian-donated helicopters to dump their bodies at sea, while in September 1993 the PNG government offered to pay compensation for Solomon Island civilians killed by PNGDF forces who had pursued BRA members across the border. The fighting in Bougainville also exposed weaknesses in command, training, discipline and force structure. Later the army was also involved in the controversial Sandline affair of 1997, when the PNGDF Commander—Jerry Singirok—blocked the use of mercenaries to destroy the revolt on Bougainville. The current restructure has focused on the removal of men of a quality now judged to have been unsuitable for the Bougainville campaign and since the end of operations there the army has, with Australian assistance, attempted to reform all aspects of its training and administration.

In the early 21st century terrorism has become increasingly a concern for Papua New Guinea policy-makers and one of the major objectives of the army for 2008 is to prepare itself to deter any attack on its sovereignty but more particularly to terrorist attacks. Equally, although the army has no history of peace support contributions, its involvement in RAMSI has proven a catalyst to determine how it could train for and be used in UN operations. Despite these efforts the army is still not in a position to provide forces with the appropriate "level of training and discipline" without significant risk, according to Janes. To be sure, however, "the army command views such deployment as their contribution to the 'economic well-being of PNG' and a way of maintaining any semblance of a proficient armed force."

As of 2015, women are permitted to serve in non-combat roles in the PNGDF's Land Element.

=== Current organisation ===
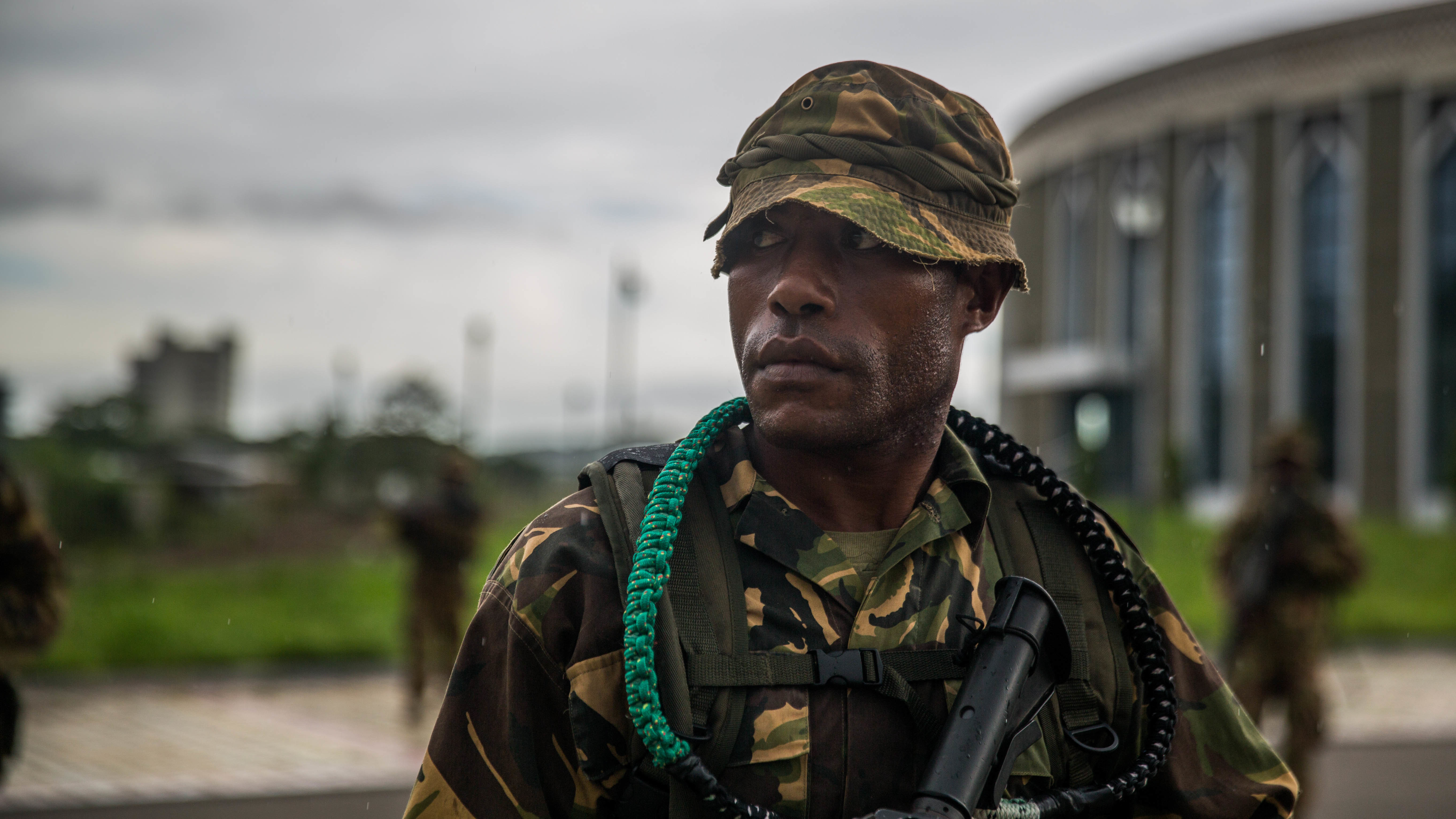
A PNGDF soldier in 2017

The Land Element is directly commanded by the Commander PNGDF, Brigadier General Gilbert Toropo, and has been significantly reduced in size due to restructuring (from 3,500 to 1,800 as of late 2007) and currently comprises the following:

- Command HQ (Port Moresby);
- two light Infantry battalions of the Royal Pacific Islands Regiment (1 RPIR at Port Moresby and 2 RPIR at Wewak);
- Long Range Reconnaissance Unit;
- one Engineer battalion (Lae);
- Signals Squadron (Port Moresby);
- EOD unit;
- Preventative Health Platoon; and
- Defence Academy (Lae)

A ceremonial guard was established in 2015.

The army's main bases include Port Moresby, Wewak and Lae, while company strength outstations are located at Kiunga and Vanimo. Communications centres are found at all of these locations and also on Manus island. Papua New Guinea has large areas of uninhabited jungle suitable for training. A training depot is maintained at Goldie River near Port Moresby and at Lae.

Historically the army has been poorly trained; however Australia has recently made this the focus of the Enhanced Defence Partnership programme, supplying training, advisors and equipment. New Zealand is also contributing training assistance under its Mutual Assistance Programme. Equally army personnel have in the past trained with the French in New Caledonia, while US Special Forces have occasionally undertaken joint exercises in PNG. At present, however, over 90 per cent of the budget is dedicated to pay and retrenchments, and as a consequence there is little left to fund training exercises. While most soldiers are not currently formally qualified for their rank, there are determined moves to professionalise the army after the restructure is complete. Indeed, the army has an officer training academy and a small trade training capacity, which is being boosted by Australian personnel. A small number of officer candidates also undertake training at the Royal Military College – Duntroon, in Canberra. Australian procedures are followed as a matter of course, and their influence is increasing as more joint training exercises are held.

==== Long Range Reconnaissance Unit ====
The Long Range Reconnaissance Unit (LRRU) is the Land Element's special forces unit responsible for special reconnaissance and for providing the PNGDF's counter terrorism capability. In 1996, the Special Forces Unit (SFU) was formed which was later renamed the LRRU. The LRRU has trained with the Australian Special Air Service Regiment (SASR) and the New Zealand Special Air Service (NZSAS) in Papua New Guinea in its long-range reconnaissance role for many years.

In 2014, the LRRU commenced developing an urban counterterrorism and hostage rescue capability for the APEC Summit held in 2018, it received new equipment in preparation for this. The LRRU then provided a response capability for the Pacific Games in July 2015, with training provided by Australian Army Special Operations Command (SOCOMD) units and the NZSAS.

The Warrior Wing established in the 1990s by United States Army Special Forces (Green Berets) consists of experienced LRRU soldiers who provide reconnaissance training and coordinate exercises with foreign units.

=== Equipment ===
The army is only lightly equipped—possessing no artillery, heavy weapons, anti-armour or anti-aircraft weapons. It is chronically short of equipment, maintaining just a few mortars, small arms and limited communications equipment. Because mobility is severely impaired due to PNG's mountainous geography, heavy rain forest, and the nation's underdeveloped transport infrastructure, artillery is not used by the New Guinea Defence Force.

Regardless, while the army's equipment remains largely outdated and inadequate, some new equipment was procured in late 2003 was commissioned during 2004. PNGDF has fielded a new digital satellite communications network, enabling it to communicate with its personnel on the Solomon Islands, stationed there as part of PNG's commitment to the international intervention force. The army can also now communicate securely with its personnel located at seven fixed ground stations—the barracks at Murray, Taurama, Goldie, Lombrum, Igam, Vanimo and Moem. The system also includes mobile units installed on small trucks which communicate from remote locations via the fixed ground stations. Equally in June 2007, the army received 32 new HF Barrett communication radios, at a cost of PGK800,000, in order to assist with providing security for the 2007 election.

The security of the PNGDF's weapons is also an issue, and it is alleged that various mortars, guns and small arms have been used in tribal conflicts and robberies. In response, more secure armouries have been provided by Australia, however weapon security remains elusive. Further attempts to improve weapons security were implemented during 2005 with fortnightly weapon checks and making unit commanders accountable for the return of weapons, with serious action threatened for any defaults. Also, soldiers are now forbidden to carry weapons in public without specific permission.

The Chinese government donated 40 military vehicles in December 2015. In 2017–2018, China donated armoured vehicles, troop carriers, buses, mobile kitchen vans and ambulances. Ten armoured vehicles were donated including four Norinco WZ-551 wheeled infantry fighting vehicles.

In May 2020, Australia donated 28 DJI Phantom drones to patrol its border with Indonesia.

==== Small arms ====
In 2006, the PNGDF headquarters issued a directive to standardise weapons, with the number of small arms types to be reduced from 58 to 11, subsequently 3,418 weapons were disposed of. In October 2025, the Australian government announced that it would supply the PNGDF with 3,500 rifles over the course of the next four years. In February 2026, the Deputy Secretary of the Capability Acquisition and Sustainment Group said that the Australian Combat Assault Rifle (ACAR) manufactured by Lithgow Arms had been chosen as the rifle that Australia will provide to the PNGDF.

Name	Origin	Type	Notes
Pistols
Sig Sauer	United States	Semi-automatic pistol	
Rifles
FAMAS	France	Assault rifle	
M16A2	United States	Assault rifle	Standard service rifle of the PNGDF.
Machine guns
Ultimax 100	Singapore	Light machine gun	Ultimax 100 Mk.2.
FN MAG	Belgium	General-purpose machine gun	MAG-58 variant.
M60	United States	General-purpose machine gun	Sourced from Australia.
Browning M2HB	United States	Heavy machine gun	
Explosive weapons
M203	United States	Grenade launcher	

==== Vehicles ====
Name	Origin	Type	Quantity	Notes
WZ-551	China	Infantry fighting vehicle	4	Donated by China
Harrow Security Vehicles Tygor E1 up-armoured Toyota Land Cruiser	United Arab Emirates	Armored car	9	Donated by Australia
Harrow Security Vehicles Vader X up-armoured Toyota Land Cruiser	United Arab Emirates	Armored car	3	Donated by Australia

== Air Element ==
PNGDF roundel

The Air Element of the PNGDF, operating a small number of light aircraft and rotary wing assets in support of army operations. Like the PNGDF in general the air element suffers from chronic equipment shortages and underfunding, but probably even more so than the other two branch elements. The role of the air force is to support army operations with transport, air re-supply and medical evacuation capabilities. In future it may also be used to bolster border security and conduct maritime surveillance missions.

=== Current organisation ===
The Air Element is commanded by Lieutenant Colonel Nancy Wii. It consists of the Air Transport Wing and has only one squadron—the Air Transport Squadron—with a strength of about 100 personnel, being based at Jackson Airport in Port Moresby. In recent years it has suffered from significant serviceability issues. Indeed, it only became airborne again in 2005 for the first time in five years, as funding shortages resulted in the small transport aircraft fleet being grounded for an extended period. By January 2006, one CN-235, one Arava and one UH-1H Iroquois helicopter had been made operational, with single examples of each of those three types also being returned to service by 2007.

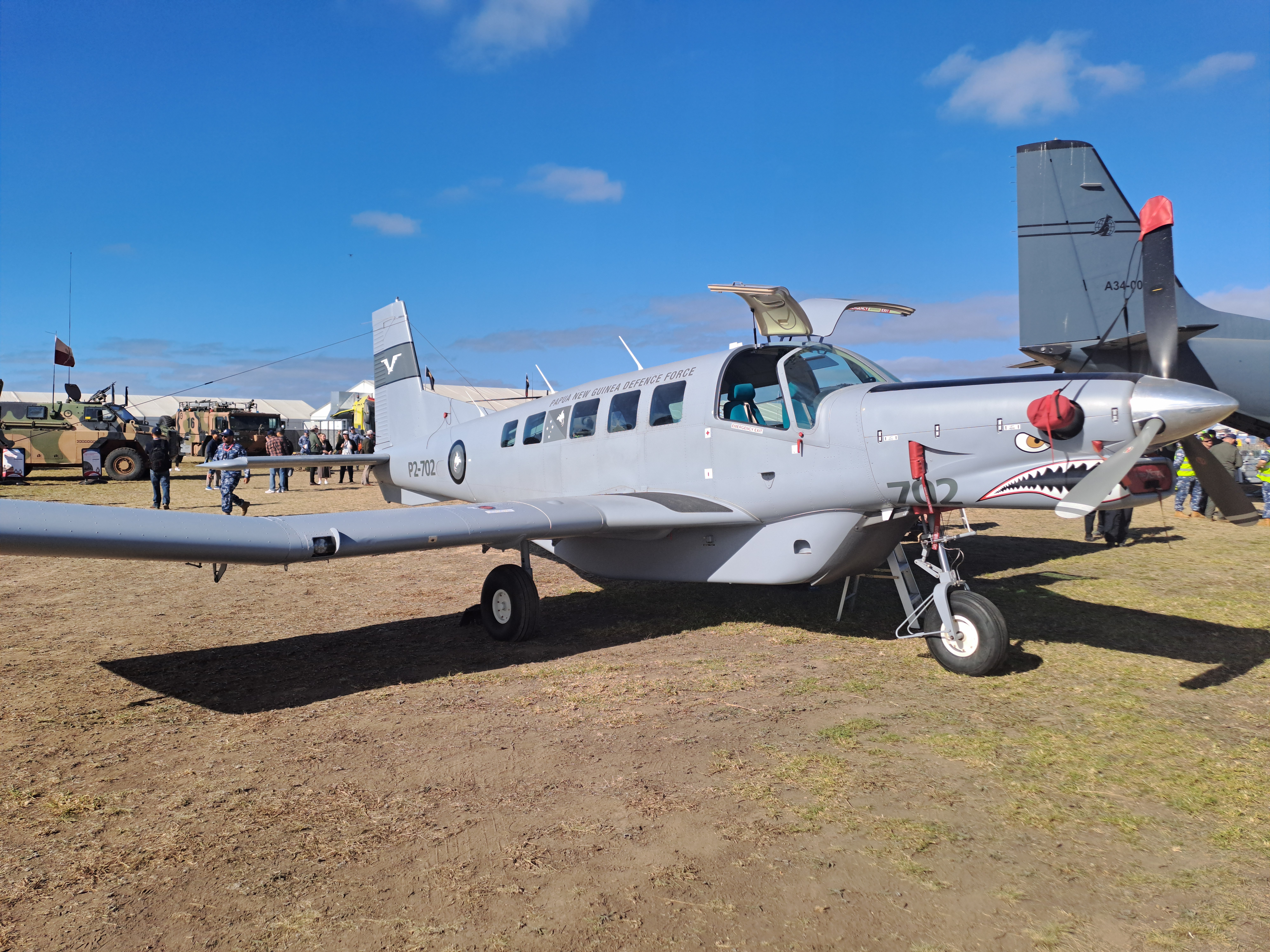
A Papua New Guinea Defence Force PAC-750 XSTOL at the 2025 Avalon Airshow.

A 2003 review recommended the air element's strength be reduced to 65 personnel, a figure which the PNGDF is working towards as part of its current restructuring programme. By the end of 2004, the air element was suffering from an acute shortage of pilots, but recruitment in 2005 succeeded in raising the pilot pool to 10 by January 2006. After several years when no training was undertaken pilots are now sent to Singapore and Indonesia for instruction on simulators. Given its limited operational activity and the lack of combat equipment, little thought has been given to tactical doctrine however.

Since 2012, the Australian government has facilitated the lease of two helicopters from Hevilift PNG to provide a rotary wing capability which in 2016 was extended until 2019. In February 2016, a contract was signed with New Zealand company Pacific Aerospace for four PAC P-750 XSTOL aircraft for search and rescue and surveillance and two PAC CT/4 Airtrainer aircraft. One PAC P-750 was delivered in 2018 and in 2021, with the assistance of the Royal Australian Air Force, its airworthiness was restored. In 2023, Australia donated two new PAC P-750s to the Air Element.

In September 2025, one of the two grounded CASA CN-235s had its engines restarted after eight years, as part of the CASA Recovery Program. After the completion of phase one, which was 85-90% complete, the aircraft will be flown to Indonesia as part of phase two for a complete overhaul. After the completion of phase two, the PNGDF plans to have Indonesian companies repair the other grounded CN-235 aircraft.

In February 2026, the Air Element received a Bell 412 helicopter.

=== Current inventory ===
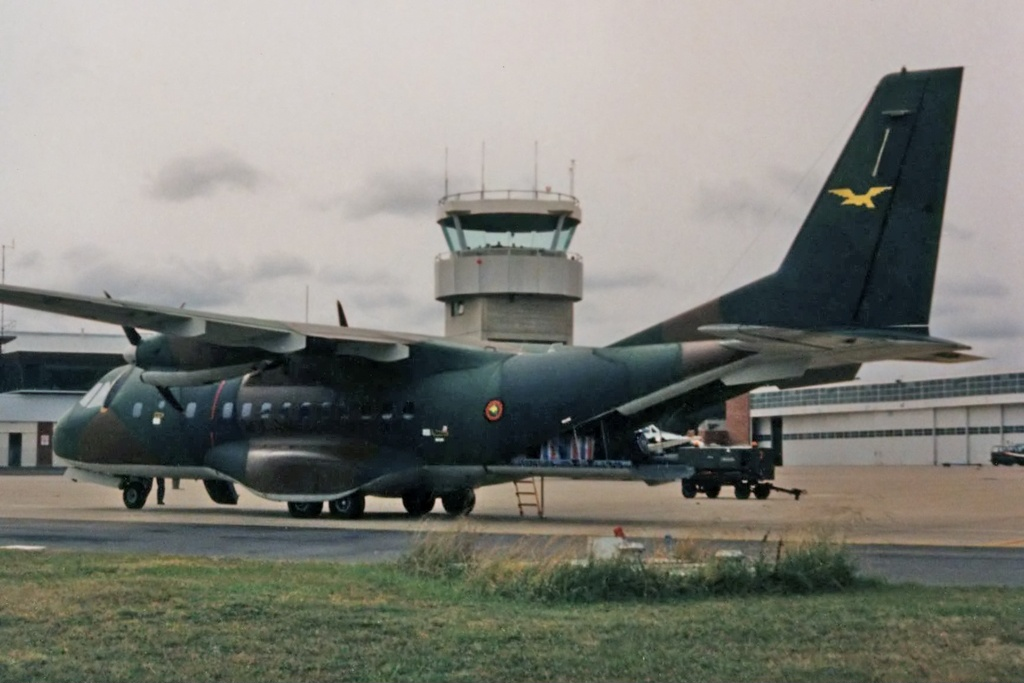
A PNGDF CN-235 at RAAF Fairbairn in Australia

Aircraft	Origin	Type	In service	Notes
Transport
PAC P-750	New Zealand	Utility	3	
CASA CN-235	Spain; Indonesia	SAR; Utility		2 aircraft not in service
Helicopters
Bell 412	United States	Utility	1	Leased for PNG by Australian Government.

=== Retired aircraft ===
Previous aircraft operated by Papua New Guinea consisted of the Douglas C-47, GAF Nomad, IAI-201 Arava, and the Bell UH-1 Huey helicopter. The UH-1H Iroquois helicopters and IAI Arava fixed-wing aircraft were to be retired in 2016.

== Maritime Element ==
The Maritime element is the naval branch of the PNGDF, being mainly a light patrol force and is responsible for defending local waters only. It too suffers from chronic equipment shortages and underfunding. The navy has three primary roles: support for military operations, EEZ protection, and heavy logistic support for the army and civil society.

=== Current organisation ===
Naval Ensign

The navy is commanded by Commander Sebastian Maru and consists of approximately 200 personnel and is based in Port Moresby (HMPNGS Basilisk) and Manus Island (HMPNGS Tarangau) and currently comprises the following:

- Four Guardian-class patrol boats (supplied by Australia)
- One Balikpapan-class landing craft (transferred from Royal Australian Navy)
- One Malaysian built landing craft (supplied by Australia)

According to Janes, the navy is badly underfunded and the task of patrolling such a large Exclusive Economic Zone (EEZ) is too great and they are heavily reliant for information about the presence of foreign ships on daily reports supplied by US satellite surveillance. The main concern is illegal tuna fishing by Japanese vessels. Australia continues to assist the navy patrol its waters and in the training of personnel. A Royal Australian Navy Officer has been seconded to PNG's National Co-ordination Centre and joint exercises are held regularly to review and strengthen current maritime border surveillance. The Australian Border Force also takes part in cross-border patrols. As a matter of course, Australian doctrine and procedures are used.

In November 2018, Australia donated to PNG the first of four Austal-built Guardian-class patrol boats to replace the four Pacific-class patrol boats donated to PNG in the late-1980s through the Pacific Patrol Boat Program. The first Guardian-class boat HMPNGS Ted Diro was commissioned in February 2019. In 2018, the first Pacific-class boat was decommissioned with the remaining three decommissioned in 2021. In June 2022, PNG commissioned HMPNGS Cape Gloucester, a Malaysian-built landing craft donated to PNG by Australia. Cape Gloucester replaced two Balikpapan-class landing craft: HMPNGS Salamaua decommissioned in 2020 and HMPNGS Buna decommissioned in 2021. HMPNGS Lakekamu, a Balikpapan-class landing craft donated to PNG by Australia in 2014, remains in service as a training ship in addition to transporting equipment.

Australia is funding a A$175 million upgrade to the Lombrum Naval Base on Manus Island with construction commencing in mid-2020.

=== Vessels ===
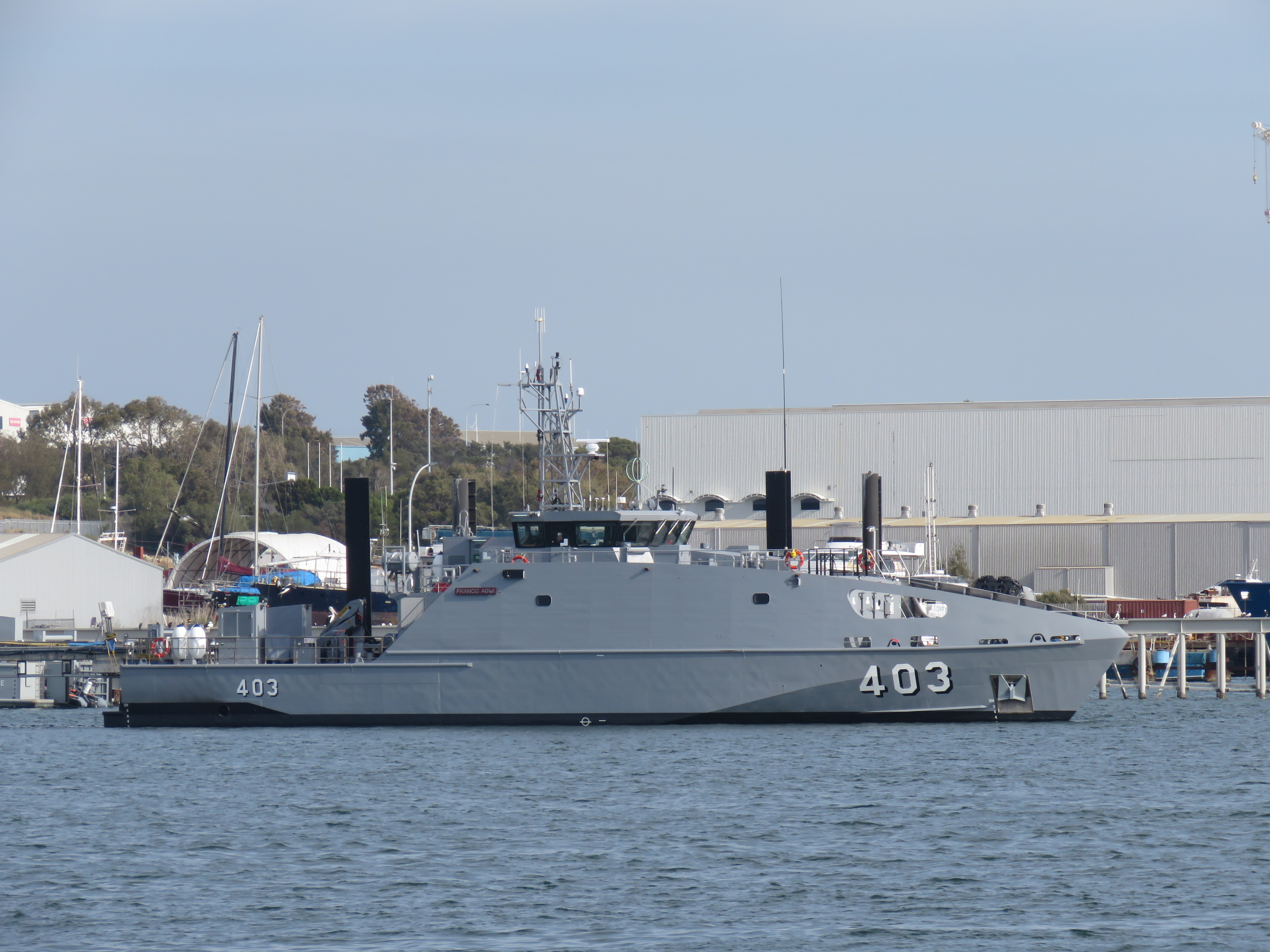
HMPNGS Francis Agwi at Austal shipyard in 2021

Vessel	Origin	Type	Notes
HMPNGS Lakekamu	Australia	Landing Craft	Balikpapan class
HMPNGS Cape Gloucester (L21)	Malaysia	Landing Craft	
HMPNGS Ted Diro (P401)	Australia	Patrol Boat	Guardian Class
HMPNGS Rochus Lokinap (P402)	Australia	Patrol Boat	Guardian Class
HMPNGS Francis Agwi (P403)	Australia	Patrol Boat	Guardian Class
HMPNGS Gilbert Toropo (P404)	Australia	Patrol Boat	Guardian Class
