= Amon Murwira =

Zimbabwean politician

The Honourable Prof. Amon Murwira
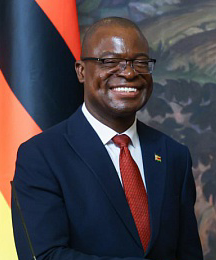
- Murwira in 2025

Minister of Foreign Affairs and International Trade
- Incumbent
- Assumed office 15 October 2024
- President: Emmerson Mnangagwa
- Deputy: Sheillah Chikomo
- Preceded by: Frederick Shava

Minister of Higher and Tertiary Education, Innovation, Science and Technology Development
- In office 2 December 2017 – 15 October 2024
- President: Emmerson Mnangagwa
- Deputy: Simelisizwe Sibanda
- Preceded by: Jonathan Moyo
- Succeeded by: Frederick Shava

Personal details
- Born: 1970 (age 55–56) Nzuwa Village, Gutu, Rhodesia
- Party: ZANU–PF
- Education: University of Zimbabwe

Professor Amon Murwira (born 1970) is a Zimbabwean politician and academic. He is currently the Minister of Foreign Affairs and International Trade for Zimbabwe. He was appointed on 15 October 2024 when he swapped positions with the former Foreign Minister, Frederick Shava. Murwira is a member of Zanu-PF and was first appointed to the cabinet in 2017. He is not a member of parliament.

Murwira had been the Minister of Higher Education, Science and Technology for Zimbabwe, appointed in Emmerson Mnangagwa's first cabinet, and reappointed after each subsequent election.

== Early life and education ==
Murwira was born in 1970 in Nzuwa Village, Gutu, Zimbabwe. His father died when he was nine years old. He attended Shumbayarerwa Primary School, Rafemoyo Secondary School and Gutu High School, where he received six distinctions in his O-levels. In 1994 he received his Bachelors degree in Geography from the University of Zimbabwe. He then got his Masters in Environmental Systems Analysis and Monitoring at the International Institute for Aerospace Survey and Earth Sciences (ITC) of the University of Twente in the Netherlands. He received his Ph.D. in Geographic Information Science (GIS and Remote Sensing) from the University of Zimbabwe.

== Career ==
Before getting his Masters, Murwira taught Geography first at Chirichoga Secondary School in Nemamwa, Masvingo, and the at Victoria High School in Masvingo. He then went to work for the government as an ecologist in Mashonaland East. The Ministry of Environment, Bureau of Natural Resources, sponsored further study in Canada in remote sensing.

Following his Ph.D. Murwira became a lecturer in the Department of Geography and Environmental Science at the University of Zimbabwe. He was a contributing author to Human-Wildlife Conflicts in Southern Africa: Riding the Whirlwind in Mozambique and Zimbabwe. In addition, Murwira has over one hundred scientific publications to his credit.

Immediately following the 2017 Zimbabwean coup d'état, Murwira received a surprise appointment as Minister of Higher and Tertiary Education, Science and Technology Development.

The Minister for Higher Education, Professor Murwira, has been a leading brain in applied research. What you are looking at is an enhancement of that ‘vocationalisation’ of Higher and Tertiary Education so that it has a practical bearing as a hatchet for solutions to the industrial question.

— President Mnangagwa: On the appointment of Amon Murwira

Murwira was also, briefly, the acting Minister of Foreign Affairs and International Trade from 20 January 2021 to 2 March 2021, after the death in office of Sibusiso Moyo.
