= Zimbabwe Institute of Management =

Zimbabwean professional Institution

- Established: 1957; 69 years ago
- Mission: Develop and promote best practice in management and leadership in Zimbabwe
- Focus: Business Leadership and Management
- President: Remigio Chingara
- Chair: Arnold Tinaye Jacob
- Head: Godfrey Sunguro (CEO)
- Address: 34 Fereday Drive
- Location: Eastlea, Harare, Zimbabwe
- Website: zim.ac.zw

Zimbabwe Institute of Management is a membership based and non-profit making management organisation founded in 1957 with the main goal of promoting and developing best practices in management and leadership.

The institute offers Executive Diplomas in Business Leadership, General Management, Applied Strategy, Sports Management, Supply Chain Management Monitoring and Evaluation as well as diplomas in Business Administration, Project Management, Environmental Health & Safety Management, Supervisory Management and Security Management, as well as certificate courses in management.

== History ==
The Institute traces its origins to 1957, when a group of managers began meeting informally to address professional challenges and promote management development. The body later formalized as The Rhodesian Association of Management. In 1959, this became The Rhodesian Institute of Management and, following Zimbabwe's independence, it adopted the name Zimbabwe Institute of Management in 1980.

In 1978, the Institute introduced its Management Awards, initially sponsored by Kurt Kuhn of Zisco Steel, with the first award presented to J. Fraser of Bata Shoe Company. The awards have since become an annual event, recognizing excellence in leadership across private, public, and SME sectors.

ZIM has grown into a national organization with its headquarters in Harare, a regional office in Bulawayo, and training centres in Victoria Falls, Gweru, and Mutare. It offers executive diplomas, diplomas, and certificates in management and leadership, as well as customized corporate training.

== Awards ==
The Zimbabwe Institute of Management Awards were established in 1978 by the organisation to recognise, develop and promote management leadership excellence at all managerial levels. The awards are held annually.

The award categories are

1. Private sector leader of the year,
2. Public service leader of the year,
3. SME leader of the year,
4. Young leader of the year,
5. Customer service excellence,
6. National contribution award / Lifetime Achievement Award,
7. Regional Contribution Award
8. Most Influential Leader of the Year Award

The manager of the year award is the most prestigious award and is judged on profitability, growth, human resources development, quality of social responsibility, economic development of their organisation as well as personal development of the nominated individual.

== See also ==
- Zimbabwe National Chamber of Commerce
- Zimbabwe Institute of Legal Studies
- Zimbabwe Institution of Engineers
