= Yerlan Alimbayev =

Kazakh diplomat

Erlan Älimbaev
- Ерлан Әлімбаев
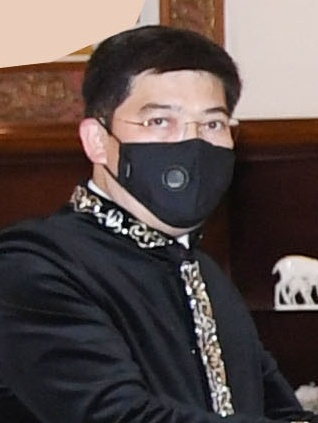
- Älimbaev in 2020

Permanent Representative of Kazakhstan to the United Nations Office at Geneva
- In office 27 January 2022 – 26 September 2025
- President: Kassym-Jomart Tokayev
- Preceded by: Janar Aitjan
- Succeeded by: Erjan Qazıxan

Ambassador of Kazakhstan to Bangladesh
- In office 2 September 2020 – 19 April 2021
- President: Kassym-Jomart Tokayev
- Preceded by: Barlıbay Sadıqov
- Succeeded by: Nurlan Jalğasbaev

Ambassador of Kazakhstan to Nepal, Bhutan and Maldives
- In office 2 September 2020 – 19 April 2021
- President: Kassym-Jomart Tokayev
- Succeeded by: Nurlan Jalğasbaev

Ambassador of Kazakhstan to India and Sri Lanka
- In office 4 September 2019 – 19 April 2021
- President: Kassym-Jomart Tokayev
- Preceded by: Bolat Särsenbaev
- Succeeded by: Nurlan Jalğasbaev

Personal details
- Born: 6 January 1975 (age 51) Kyzylorda, Kyzylorda Region, Kazakh SSR, Soviet Union
- Education: Geneva School of Diplomacy and International Relations; Al-Farabi Kazakh National University

Erlan Altynbaiūly Älimbaev (Kazakh: Ерлан Алтынбайұлы Әлімбаев; born 6 January 1975) is a Kazakh politician and diplomat.

Prior to his appointment as the Ambassador to India, Alimbayev has served as Ambassador-at-Large of the Ministry of Foreign Affairs of Kazakhstan and as the National Coordinator on the matters of the activities of the Shanghai Cooperation Organization from Kazakhstan. In various years, he held diplomatic positions in the Embassies of Kazakhstan in India, the Republic of Korea, as well as the Permanent Mission of Kazakhstan to the UN Office, and other international organizations in Geneva, Switzerland.

== Early life and education ==
Born in Kyzylorda, Alimbayev earned his bachelor's degree in Oriental studies from the Al-Farabi Kazakh National University. Alimbayev also hold a master's degree from Geneva School of Diplomacy and International Relations. He speaks Kazakh, Russian, English, French, Hindi, and Urdu and is the recipient of several State awards and recognition.
