= Claire Akamanzi =

Rwandan lawyer

Clare Akamanzi
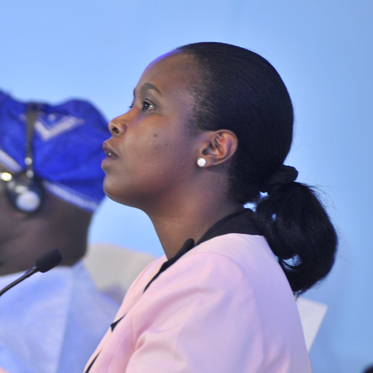
- in 2011
- Born: 1979 (age 46–47); Uganda
- Citizenship: Rwandan
- Education: Makerere University (Bachelor of Laws); Law Development Centre (Diploma in Legal Practice); University of Pretoria (Master of Laws); Harvard University (Master of Public Administration); Concordia University; Honorary Degree in Laws
- Occupations: Politician, lawyer
- Years active: 2004–present
- Known for: The Law, Politics
- Title: Former CEO of RDB ,( Rwanda Development Board )

Clare Akamanzi is a Rwandan lawyer, public administrator, businesswoman, and politician who served as the executive director and chief executive officer of the Rwanda Development Board from February 2017 to September 2023. The position is a cabinet-level appointment made by the President of Rwanda. She has since been appointed as the chief executive officer of NBA Africa, following the resignation of former CEO Victor Williams.

== Background and education ==
Akamanzi was born in Uganda to Rwandan refugee parents in 1979. She is the fourth-born in a family of six siblings. She attained pre-university education in various parts of Uganda. The family moved a lot, because her parents were refugees in Uganda.

She is married and is a mother to two children. She holds a Bachelor of Laws, awarded by Makerere University, in Kampala, Uganda's capital city. She also holds the Diploma in Legal Practice, obtained from the Law Development Centre, also in Kampala.

Her Master of Laws in trade and investment law was obtained from the University of Pretoria, in South Africa. She also holds a Masters in Public Administration, obtained from Harvard University, in Cambridge, Massachusetts, in the United States. She received an honorary degree in Laws from Concordia University in June 2018.

== Career ==
She began her career in 2004 in Geneva, Switzerland at the World Trade Organization (WTO) headquarters. The government of Rwanda appointed her as a diplomat/special trade negotiator at the WTO. Later, she transferred to the Rwandan embassy in London, the United Kingdom as the commercial diplomat (commercial attaché).

She returned to Rwanda in 2006 and was appointed Deputy Director General of the then Rwanda Investment and Export Promotion Agency (RIEPA) "before RDB was merged with other institutions in 2008". In 2008, Akamanzi became the Deputy chief executive officer responsible for Business Operations and Services, at RDB. She later transitioned to being the chief operating officer of the Rwanda Development Board. She then took study leave to pursue graduate studies in the United States. When she returned, she served as "Head of Strategy and Policy" in the President's Office.

In 2020, the World Health Organization (WHO) announced that Akamanzi was one of the founding board members of the WHO Foundation.

On 27 December 2023, it was announced that Akamanzi will hold the position of the CEO of NBA Africa starting from 23 January 2024.

== Other activities ==
- Africa Europe Foundation (AEF), Member of the High-Level Group of Personalities on Africa-Europe Relations (since 2020)

== Publications ==
- In the Trenches: Open for Business
- Rwanda's Push For Five-Star Development: An Interview With The Ceo Of The Rwanda Development Board On The Present And Future Of Rwandan Economic Development
- Development At Crossroads: The Economic Partnership Agreement Negotiations With Eastern And Southern African Countries On Trade In Services

== See also ==
- Valentine Rugwabiza
