= NBA Africa Game =

NBA Africa Game may refer to:

- NBA Africa Game 2015
- NBA Africa Game 2017
- NBA Africa Game 2018
