= Institute of Forensic Accountants =

The Institute of Forensic Accountants is a professional body representing and providing professional certification for forensic accountants in Nigeria. As of September 2015 it had 4,300 members and 1,800 registered students. The institute was established in March 2007 to regulate the profession of forensic accountancy in Nigeria. The head office of the institute is in Kaduna. The institute also has regional offices in Abuja, Kano, Jos and Port Harcourt.

== History ==
The institute was established in 2007 under the Corporate Affairs Commission, Nigeria. The establishment process of the institute started in 2006, but because of the complex nature of forensic accounting, on 28 November 2006 the Corporate Affairs Commission, Nigeria sought for written permission for the establishment of the institute from the Nigerian Federal Ministry of Education's and the Nigerian Federal Ministry of Justice. These approvals were given by Nigerian Federal Ministry of Education and Nigerian Federal Ministry of Justice in November 2006 and February 2007 respectively. On 9 March 2007, the Certificate of establishment of the institute was issued thereby making it a forensic accounting educational institute in Nigeria.

== Membership ==
The membership of the institute consists of two grades:

- Associate member, which bears 'Certified Forensic Accountant' (CFA)
- Fellow member which bears 'Fellow of Forensic Accountant' (FFA)

To be admitted as an Associate, a candidate must have completed a period of qualifying practice of at least three years and passed the institute’s qualifying examinations. To be a Fellow, a candidate must have CFA and in addition with post-qualification experience of not less than five years.
