= Zié =

Zié is a masculine given name. Notable people with the name include:

- Zié Diabaté (born 1989), Ivorian footballer
- Zié Ouattara (born 2000), Ivorian footballer
