= Zimbabwe Institution of Engineers =

Professional organisation of engineers in Zimbabwe

The Zimbabwe Institution of Engineers is the professional organization of engineers in Zimbabwe. It has graded membership, including student, technician, graduate and corporate membership as well as the status of fellow.

== See also ==
- Zimbabwe Institute of Management
- Zimbabwe Institute of Legal Studies
