= Ministry of Higher and Tertiary Education, Innovation, Science and Technology Development (Zimbabwe) =

Government ministry of Zimbabwe

Agency overview
- Preceding agency: Ministry of Higher and Tertiary Education
- Jurisdiction: Government of Zimbabwe
- Headquarters: 6th Floor, Block F, Mgandane Dlodlo Building, Corner Simon Muzenda Street and Samora Machel Avenue, Harare; 17.82514383877964°S 31.053032243897498°E
- Minister responsible: Frederick Shava, Minister of Higher and Tertiary Education, Innovation, Science and Technology Development
- Deputy Minister responsible: Simelisizwe Sibanda, Deputy Minister of Higher and Tertiary Education, Innovation, Science and Technology Development
- Website: mhtestd.gov.zw

The Ministry of Higher and Tertiary Education, Innovation, Science and Technology Development is a government ministry focused on education in Zimbabwe and is responsible for universities, polytechnics and colleges in Zimbabwe. The incumbent minister is Frederick Shava.

It oversees:

- National Council for Higher Education
- Universities and colleges in Zimbabwe

Former ministers include:

- Amon Murwira 2 December 2017 – 15 October 2024
- Jonathan Moyo 6 July 2015 – 27 November 2017
- Oppah Muchinguri December 2014 – 6 July 2015
- Olivia Muchena 10 September 2013 – 9 December 2014
- Stan Mudenge 16 April 2005 – 4 October 2012
- Herbert Murerwa 9 February 2004 – 16 April 2005

== See also ==
- Education in Zimbabwe
- Ministry of Higher Education, Science and Technology (Zimbabwe)
