= Chishawasha =

Roman Catholic Jesuit mission in Zimbabwe

Coordinates: 17.788880°S 31.227203°E

Chishawasha is the name of a Roman Catholic Jesuit mission located about 25 km east of Harare, Zimbabwe. The mission was founded by the Jesuit priest Father Francis Richartz in 1892 on a large farm. The mission has 3 schools - Chishawasha Primary School, a secondary school for girls called St Dominic's' Chishawasha as well as a mostly-boys school called St. Ignatius College. There is a Regional Major Seminary for diocesan priests from Zimbabwe and Botswana, and Silveira House, a Jesuit centre for religious training and education, is also located there.

== Background ==
The Jesuit Mission arrived in Zimbabwe between 1890 and 1898 along with the Pioneer Column serving as chaplains. In recognition to this service, Cecil John Rhodes gave them a farm which they used for developing a mission centre.
