= National Council for Higher Education, Zimbabwe =

The National Council for Higher Education is the parastatal responsible for accreditation of universities in Zimbabwe, under the Ministry of Higher and Tertiary Education. It was established in 1990 as a measure of quality insurance of higher education in Zimbabwe. Increasing access to education in recent decades has increased the number of higher level institutions in the country. For example, eight more universities were established between 1999 and 2005. The Zimbabwe Council for Higher Education (ZIMCHE) was formed in 2006 as another measure to guarantee quality and accreditation for university education. As of 2012, there were fifteen registered universities (nine public and five private), fifteen teachers' colleges, eight polytechnics and two industrial training colleges.

== See also ==
- Education in Zimbabwe
