= Zimbabwe National Chamber of Commerce =

Private sector voluntary organization in Zimbabwe

The Zimbabwe National Chamber of Commerce (The Chamber) is a private sector voluntary organization established in 1894 for The Chamber is established for the purpose of developing, promoting, and lobbying for its members and the local business community. As an independent organization the Zimbabwe National Chamber of Commerce represents the interest of its members through lobbying, collaboration and facilitation. It additionally strives to serve as a way for businesses and authorities in Zimbabwe to communicate with each-other.
