= 2014 Australian federal budget =

Australian federal budget 2014–15
- Submitted: 13 May 2014
- Submitted by: Abbott government
- Submitted to: House of Representatives
- Country: Australia
- Parliament: 44th
- Party: Liberal/National Coalition
- Treasurer: Joe Hockey
- Total revenue: $385.8 billion
- Program spending: $417.8 billion
- Deficit: $37.9 billion
- Debt: $238.7 billion (net debt)
- Website: www.budget.gov.au/2014-15/

The 2014 Australian federal budget was the federal budget to fund government services and operations for the 2014/15 financial year. The 2014 budget was the first delivered by the Abbott government, since the Coalition's victory in the 2013 Australian federal election. Treasurer Joe Hockey presented the budget to the House of Representatives on 13 May 2014.

The budget featured significant changes to address a perceived deficit crisis. This included a proposed dramatic downsizing of government bureaucracy, and contained significant changes to welfare, new initiatives for a medical research fund and spending on roads. A budget surplus exceeding 1% of GDP was not expected until 2023.

The austere budget faced widespread criticism and was overwhelmingly rejected by the Australian public as reflected in all opinion polls after its release. Opposition to "unfair" budget measures came from the opposition and cross-bench, pensioners, economists, the union movement, students and welfare, community and disability groups with some taking to the streets in protest. The budget included changes which were contrary to pre-election commitments and promises made by the Liberals in opposition. Critics argue that every one of the following pre-election commitments made by Tony Abbott were broken in the first budget: "No cuts to education, no cuts to health, no change to pensions, no change to the GST and no cuts to the ABC or SBS." Echoes of the "dead and buried" Fightback! policy package from the 1993 election occurred with proposals to defer unemployment benefits for six months for under 30s and the removal of 100% GP bulk billing by the introduction of what became known as the "GP Tax", a $7 co-payment on all general practitioner medical appointments. Most of proposals were shelved, dumped or modified in the wake of the significant backlash.

The poor reception is viewed as one of the core reasons behind Abbott being replaced as Liberal Party leader and Australian Prime Minister in September 2015, by Malcolm Turnbull, at the September 2015 Liberal Party of Australia leadership spill. This also lead to the dumping of Hockey as Treasurer, with Hockey resigning from Parliament by the end of the year. The health & medical elements of this budget were also a factor in the 2025 Australian federal election. Peter Dutton, the Leader of the Opposition at the 2025 election, was the Minister for Health during the attempted introduction of the GP Tax, a fact widely publicised and referenced during the election campaign that saw Dutton defeated by Labor in the general election, and for his seat in the House Of Representatives.

== National Commission of Audit ==
The Abbott government commissioned a National Commission of Audit in October 2013 to recommend measures to reduce government spending. The Commission made 86 recommendations, including a slowing of increases in the age pension, an increase in the retirement age to 70 by 2035 and the inclusion of the family home in new means testing from 2027. These Commission's recommendations were adopted in the budget. Other controversial recommendations include co-payments of Medicare bulk billing.

== Forecasts ==
Before the budget's release Treasurer Joe Hockey signalled the budget would contain widespread spending cuts in response to what he described as an unsustainable growth in government expenditure.

=== Deficit ===
In August 2013, in a budget update before the forthcoming federal election, the Australian Treasurer under the Second Rudd government forecast a $30.1 billion deficit for 2013–14. In December 2013, the Treasurer (Joe Hockey) under the Abbott government forecast a $47 billion deficit for the same period, due to the new government's decision not to implement savings and revenue measures put forward by the Rudd government before the election, and an unexpected injection of $8 billion into the Reserve Bank. The four-year forward estimates project a difference of $68 billion. More than half of that difference has been attributed to lower government revenue from taxation. A surplus was projected for 2023/24.

The budget recorded a deficit for 2014–15 of $37.9 billion.

== Revenue ==
=== Taxation ===
The budget introduced a "deficit levy" of 2% on personal incomes over $180,000, which was expected to raise around $2.5 billion a year over its duration. Legislation to impose the levy, called the Temporary Budget Repair Levy, was assented to on 25 June 2014, and commenced on 1 July 2014 and will apply for three years.

The corporate tax rate decreased by 1.5% from 1 July 2015 to 28.5% according to this budget.

The National Commission of Audit recommended that the Family Tax Benefit Part B be abolished. It will now be means tested to a new threshold of $100,000. Families will cease being eligible for the payment when their youngest child turns six.

The indexation of the federal fuel excise was reintroduced. The adjustment will be made twice a year and is expected to raise $3.7 billion in its first four years. Indexation had been abandoned in 2001. The change took effect on 10 November 2014, increasing the base rate to 38.6 from 38.14¢ per litre.

== Expenditure ==
In April 2014, Joe Hockey made it clear the budget would see a significant tightening of federal government expenditure which would be felt by all sectors of the community. More than three-quarters of the savings in the 2014 budget were the result of cuts to government spending.

=== General government ===
A number of federal government services and approvals will increase in price and new fees will apply including some provided by Austrade and Geoscience Australia. Funding for foreign aid was frozen leading to a saving of $7.6 billion over five years.

Federal politicians and public servants will have their salary frozen for one year. Post retirement benefits for federal politicians are being reigned in. This includes limitations on travel expenses, staffing arrangements and working entitlements. 3,000 positions within the Australian Taxation Office will be lost with thousands of staff retrenched from other major federal departments. The Australian Workforce and Productivity Agency and the Australian Water Commission were to be abolished. 76 government agencies will be abolished a small number merged or privatised. These cutbacks are expected to save $500 million over four years. The budget for the CSIRO was reduced by $146.8 million over four years.

=== Social security and welfare ===
"The age of entitlement is over."

— Speech by federal Treasurer Joe Hockey

The Newstart Allowance for those seeking work will not be available to people under the age of 25. The unemployed under the age of 30 would not qualify for any payment for six months, after which the Work for the Dole program would be required. If after another six months there is no employment, the six-month cycle of off/on payment starts again. The Schoolkids bonus is to be abolished. A Paid Parental Leave scheme was to have been introduced. The Seniors Health Card will not be eligible to retired couples with more than $1.4 million in assets. The indexation for pensions will be lowered from 2017 onwards, after it is linked to inflation rather than male average earnings. New funding for the National Rental Affordability Scheme (NRAS) ceased on 1 July 2014 with funding for tenanted NRAS properties continuing. The First Home Saver Accounts scheme will be abolished leading to savings of $134.3 million. Documents revealed in 2018 showed that the government was considering a social security measure for this budget which would cut off income support entirely for people under 30.

=== Infrastructure, transport and energy ===
The budget allocated significant funding for road infrastructure in western Sydney, including for the WestConnex motorway and for roads to Badgerys Creek Airport as well as significant funding for Melbourne's East West Link. There was also funding for two major road projects in South East Queensland – the final section of the upgrade of the Ipswich Motorway and the Toowoomba Second Range Crossing.

The budget reduced government support for renewable energy and climate change-related programs.

=== Education ===
The budget proposed to cut $4.7 billion of funding from higher education over four years. On average, the Commonwealth's contribution to the funding of university degrees was to be cut by 20%. From 2016, the interest rate charged on HECS debts, which had been linked to the consumer price index was to be charged at the same rate as government long-term borrowings. HECS debts would have to be repaid once an individual's income reaches $50,638. Universities were to be able to set their own fees for courses under a new deregulated fee system. Modelling conducted by Universities Australia indicates that the fee to study at an Australian university will on average double in cost.

$245.3 million was to be spent on continuing the school chaplaincy program over four years.

=== Defence ===
Before the budget was released the Abbott government announced Australia's biggest ever military purchase of 58 Lockheed Martin F-35 Lightning II which were to be delivered in 2018.

=== Health ===
A controversial $7 co-payment to see a bulk billing doctor, receive x-rays and get a blood test was proposed to save $3.4 billion over five years, however $5 of it will go toward medical research. All 61 Medicare Locals—organisations established to plan and fund extra health services—are going to close. The Senate blocked passage of the medical co-payment, but approved the establishment of the Medical Research Future Fund in August 2015, with funding to be found through reduced health spending and the Health and Hospitals Fund, until a balance of $20bn is reached in 2020.

=== Community services and culture ===
Funding for the ABC and SBS was cut by 1% leading to costs savings of $43.5 million. This is despite repeated comments by the Abbott government that funding to the ABC would not be cut, which Abbott later said he regretted. The ABC's contract to operate the Australia Network was cancelled after its first year of a 10-year contract. The Australia Council for the Arts had its funding cut by around $30 million. Screen Australia lost $38 million over four years.

More than 150 programs, grants and activities designed to assist Indigenous Australians are being replaced by five broad-based programs with cuts to funding of $534 million aimed at reducing duplication and waste. The next three years of funding to the National Congress of Australia's First Peoples has been cancelled. Money was allocated to a school truancy officer program, extra police in remote communities and Indigenous teenage sexual health programs.

Rural communities are expected to benefit from the introduction of the Green Army. The Green Army aims to provide training and experience in the environmental and heritage conservation fields for the unemployed aged 17–24 years. Funding for community Landcare grants has been reduced and replaced by the establishment of the National Landcare Program.

=== Science ===
Commonwealth Scientific and Industrial Research Organisation is to see its budget cut by $AU114 million, forcing the closure of two historic radio telescopes.

== Opposition and crossbench response ==
Opposition leader Bill Shorten has expressed fierce opposition to the doctor co-payments, changes to the pension age and unemployment benefits as well as cuts to state funding and the fuel excise. Both the ALP and the Australian Greens opposed the move to a deregulated fee structure for university degrees on the basis that the quality of education will likely shift towards a person's capacity to pay. Jenny Macklin criticised changes to welfare for the unemployed saying that "The Prime Minister has completely deserted young Australians looking for work". Clive Palmer dismissed the government's stated concern over sovereign debt claiming the budget was "based on lies". Senator Nick Xenophon described the budget as "mean, nasty and dumb". Independent MP Andrew Wilkie implored the opposition and crossbench MPs to go so far as to block supply in his opposition to the budget.

Following the second rejection of the budget measures by the Senate, Abbott has been challenged by Opposition Leader Bill Shorten and Clive Palmer to act upon a double dissolution trigger and request Governor-General Peter Cosgrove to dissolve both houses of Parliament or bring in a mini-budget.

== Critical reception ==
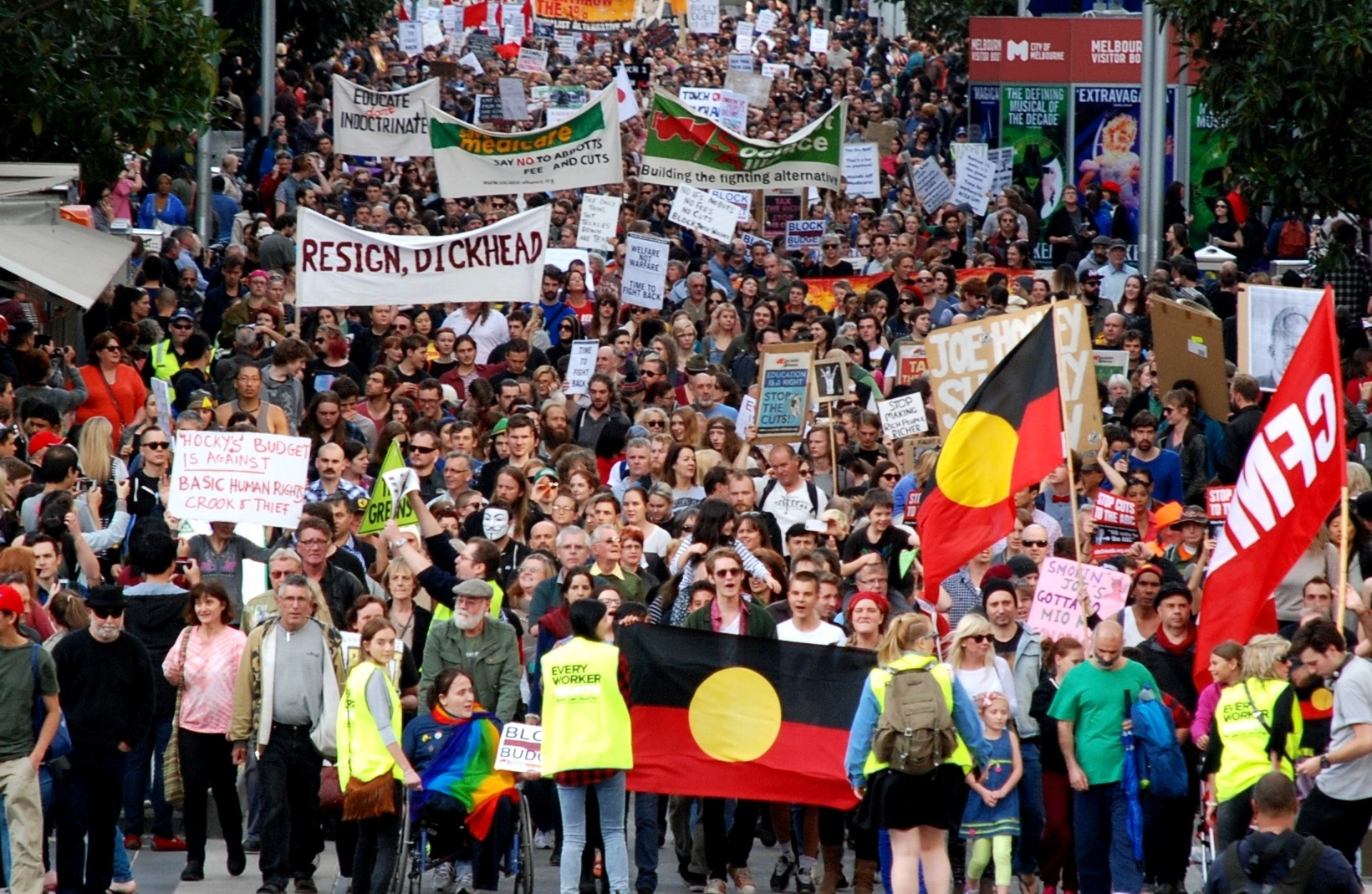
Protestors at 18 May 2014 anti-budget march in Melbourne

Even before the budget was delivered the Reserve Bank of Australia warned that a tightening of fiscal policy combined with a decline in resources construction projects would lead to an increase in the unemployment rate. Economist Ben Phillips described the budget as "very regressive overall". Economist Chris Richardson described the budget as the toughest since 1997. Welfare, community and disability groups rallied heavily against the budget. It was criticised because it places a higher burden on low income earners compared to the more wealthy. Analysis by ACOSS revealed the budget will hit low and middle-income households the hardest. Further analysis by the Treasury indicated that the budget would have disproportionately negative impact on low income households compared to wealthier ones. Chief Executive of the Council on the Ageing Ian Yates criticised changes to pension index arrangements claiming they would result in more pensioners falling below the poverty line. ACOSS was also highly critical of the cessation of payments for the first six months to unemployed people under 30. David Gonski criticised plans to limit school funding to CPI increases rather than a needs based funding model after 2017. The Australian Education Union criticised funding for chaplains in school saying the money could be spent on students with disabilities.

One of the strongest criticisms of the budget is that it breaks numerous pre-election promises. In response to a loss in funding for hospitals and schools, premiers and chief ministers attended an emergency meeting in Sydney to discuss their response. Post-budget polls revealed a large decline in support for the government, with the opposition opening up various leads on the primary and two-party vote, better prime minister, and net satisfaction ratings. It was recorded as the worst-received Australian federal budget in polling history.

Following the March in March protests two months earlier, on 18 May 2014 "tens of thousands" marched in capital cities protesting against the budget. A protest march organised by the Victorian Trades Hall Council attracted around 10,000 union members nearly a month after the budget was delivered.

In July, 20,000 people were estimated to have marched in the "Bust the Budget" rally in Melbourne against the unfairness and inequity of the 2014 budget. Concurrent marches were held in Sydney, Canberra and Newcastle and many other centres across the country.

== See also ==
- Economy of Australia
