= National Commission of Audit =

The National Commission of Audit was a commission formed by the Abbott government on 22 October 2013 as an independent body to review and report on the performance, functions and roles of the Commonwealth government. The chair of the Commission was Tony Shepherd AO who is a former head of the Business Council of Australia. The other Commissioners were Peter Boxall AO, Tony Cole AO, Robert Fisher AM and Amanda Vanstone.

The Terms of Reference for the Commission was to make recommendations to return the budget to a sustainable surplus of 1% of GDP by 2023/24. The Commission was not asked to examine the revenue side of the budget, though it looked at some revenue issues. The Commission's report was the first full scale review of government expenditures for 18 years.

== Recommendations ==
The Commission Report was titled Towards Responsible Government and published in two parts. Phase One Report, published in February 2014, dealt predominantly with improving the sustainability of finances, and Phase Two Report, published in March 2014, mostly addressed public sector performance and accountability as well as infrastructure. The Commission made 86 recommendations – 64 in its Phase One Report and 22 recommendations in its Phase Two Report. Among the recommendations, the report recommended a slowing of the increases in the age pension to 28% of the average weekly earnings, an increase in the retirement age to 70 by 2035 and the inclusion of the family home in new means testing from 2027. These Commission's recommendations were adopted in the budget.

The Commission also recommended changes to the bulk billing arrangements under Medicare, by the introduction of a compulsory copayment regime. The recommendation was accepted by the Abbott government in the 2014 Australian federal budget, though the proposed budget measure deviated from the committee's recommendation in the copayment being linked to funding for a medical research fund. The budget measure has been widely criticised.

The Commission found that the vertical and horizontal fiscal imbalance in Australia is a major impediment to growth and prosperity and recommended that the States have direct access to a portion of income tax generated in their economy and this be offset by a reduction in tied grants. It also recommended a pro rata distribution of GST with top ups to the supported States. The Commission reviewed and recommended rationalisation of many of the 900 Commonwealth bodies. Similarly on grants programs, it recommended far tighter controls and monitoring and assessment of outcomes.

The Commission calculates that its recommendations would generate savings estimated at $60 to $70 billion per year within ten years, as well as a significant annual saving in interest arising from a reduction of debt.

== Cessation ==
The National Commission of Audit ceased on 31 March 2014, six weeks before the release of the 2014 budget. Treasurer Joe Hockey, in response to the recommendations, quickly emphasised that the report was "not the budget", but did not rule out adopting any of the proposals.
