= Agricultural Competitiveness White Paper =

2015 Australian government agricultural policy document

The Agricultural Competitiveness White Paper was produced by the Abbott government, and released on 4 July 2015. It set out the Government of Australia’s roadmap of measures to grow the agriculture sector.

== The Paper ==
According to the Department of Agriculture, the White Paper outlines a $4 billion investment in Australian farmers and the competitiveness and profitability of the agriculture sector:

The White Paper responds to the ideas, feedback and comments from thousands of interested parties—including farmers, industry, business and the community—about how we can ensure the agriculture sector remains a significant contributor to the economy and local communities and takes advantage of available opportunities. The development of the White Paper was an election commitment by the government in The Coalition’s Policy for a Competitive Agriculture Sector. - Department of Agriculture

The paper announced tax changes to assist farmers and encourage investment in water infrastructure and fencing, to mitigate droughts. It also includes money for roads and dam development, to assist in production and transport to markets; and five new agricultural trade counsellors help open up overseas markets. The paper contained an $11.4 million boost to the Australian Competition & Consumer Commission (ACCC), and the engagement of a new Agriculture Commissioner at the ACCC, to encourage fair-trading and strengthen competition in supply chains.

The paper added $300 million to the National Water Infrastructure Fund, established by the Abbott Government's White Paper on Developing Northern Australia.
