= Northern Australia Roads Program =

Northern Australia Roads Program is a suite of projects designed to deliver upgrades to high priority roads in northern Australia. In 2016 the Australian Government announced 19 projects to be funded under this program, and in 2020 another was added. This program is separate to the Northern Australia Beef Roads Program, also announced in 2016, which contains a further 18 projects.

== Funding and program status ==
Funding by the Australian Government is up to 80% of total costs, with the remainder being met by state, territory and local governments. The initial funding allocation by the Australian Government was $600 million, most of which has now (in March 2022) been expended on the identified projects, most of which have been completed or are nearing completion.

In the 2022 Federal Budget a further $380 million over four years was allocated for projects yet to be determined.

== Type of work ==
The work undertaken includes bridge and culvert construction, road widening, sealing, overtaking lanes and pavement renewal.

== Projects ==
The roads involved in the 20 projects are listed below.

=== Queensland ===
- Flinders Highway (2 projects)
- Capricorn Highway
- Kennedy Developmental Road (2 projects)
- Barkly Highway
- Bowen Developmental Road
- Landsborough Highway
- Peak Downs Highway
- Bajool-Port Alma Road, Rockhampton

=== Northern Territory ===
- Plenty Highway
- Tjukaruru Road
- Keep River Plains Road
- Arnhem Highway
- Buntine Highway

=== Western Australia ===
- Great Northern Highway (3 projects)
- Marble Bar Road
- Broome-Cape Leveque Road

== Project details ==
Where there is an article about a road the project details have been included therein. For roads with no article the details are shown below.

=== Bajool-Port Alma Road ===
The project for pavement widening and safety upgrades to the port access road was completed by January 2022 at a total cost of $14.5 million.

=== Keep River Plains Road ===
The project to upgrade and seal sections of the road and construct two new bridges over Keep River and Sandy Creek was completed in late 2020 at a total cost of $87.3 million.

== White Paper on Developing Northern Australia ==
The Northern Australia Roads Program is part of the White Paper on Developing Northern Australia, a $600 million commitment to upgrade high priority roads in northern Australia.

== Parliamentary report ==
The Parliament of Australia has produced a report on transport infrastructure that includes extensive details of the Northern Australia Roads Program, among others.

== Press recognition ==
The Roads and Infrastructure magazine has published details of the progress of a number of projects under the Northern Australia Roads Program.

== Progress reporting ==
As Queensland projects under the Northern Australia Roads Program reach significant milestones these are reported on the Department of Transport and Main Roads website.

=== Completed Queensland projects ===
Date	Details
April 2021	Bowen Developmental Road sealing - Rockingham Creek to Mount Coolon.
July 2021	Capricorn Highway - Rockhampton to Gracemere Duplication.

== See also ==
- Northern Australia
- Road transport in Australia
