= New Colombo Plan =

Australian government initiative

The New Colombo Plan (NCP) is an initiative of the Australian Government aimed at increasing exchange in the Indo-Pacific region for Australian university students. The plan was launched as a signature initiative of the Abbott government's foreign policy in 2014, and was aimed at enhancing the knowledge of the Indo-Pacific in Australia, by supporting Australian undergraduates studying and undertaking internships in the region. The program consists of three separate grant streams: the New Colombo Plan Scholarship Program, the New Colombo Plan Semester Program and the New Colombo Plan Mobility Program.

In 2014, the pilot scheme supported 40 scholars and more than 1300 mobility students to study and undertake work placements. In 2015 the Scheme expanded further across the Indo-Pacific, awarding 69 scholarships and supporting more than 3,100 mobility students. The scheme was continued by the Turnbull government. By 2017, the NCP was supporting around 7,400 mobility students and 105 scholarship recipients. In 2025, DFAT announced that it planned for NCP to be supporting 500 scholars annually by 2028.

The initiative is jointly administered by the Department of Foreign Affairs and Trade (Australia) and Department of Education (Australia, 2019–2020).

== Scholarships ==
Scholars receive a dedicated case manager, internship and networking opportunities, a training program from the Australian Government, and up to $87,000 in monetary benefits per successful applicant. Scholars must undertake a credited exchange or study abroad program in the Indo-Pacific, and they typically conduct internships, mentorships, language training and community advocacy while abroad.

Scholar selection first consists of Universities nominating up to 10 students to compete nationally for the Scholarships. Each university varies in nomination selectivity and process. Successful nominees then proceed through Australian Government selection processes. Selection criteria for the Scholarships are:

- Academic excellence at the tertiary level;
- Leadership in the community;
- Adaptability and resilience; and,
- Ability to contribute to New Colombo Plan goals.

The application process also considers reports from academic and community-based referees.

== Mobility grants ==
Mobility grants are grants of between AU$3,000 and $7,000 to assist Australian undergraduate university students with short-term study, practicums, research and internships.

== See also ==
- Colombo Plan
