= White Paper on Developing Northern Australia =

The White Paper on Developing Northern Australia was a White Paper produced by the Abbott government to examine ways to invest in economic development of the north of Australia. The paper concerned parts of Australia north of the Tropic of Capricorn, from Western Australia, through the Northern Territory and into Queensland.

== Terms of Reference ==
The terms of reference of the paper stated that the Government would produce a White Paper to "set out a clear, well-defined and timely policy platform for realising the full economic potential of the north, including a plan for implementing these policies over the next two, five, 10 and 20 years:"

The north has some natural advantages relating to agriculture, mining, energy and tourism. It also has geographic advantages from its proximity to the fast-growing Asian and Tropical regions, presenting opportunities in services such as education and health. The north also has strategic importance, with defence having an important role in the security and development of northern Australia. However, it faces significant economic, environmental and social challenges, including: a sparse population; infrastructure, transport and service delivery costs; competition for skilled labour; harsh and extreme weather; and possible constraints around water resource development.

The Government wanted the Paper to produce a stocktake of northern Australia's natural, geographic and strategic assets, and the potential for further development of the region's minerals, energy, agricultural, tourism, defence and other industries, as well as a comprehensive assessment of risks and impediments to growth and set out agreed policy actions via a cross-agency Taskforce in the Department of the Prime Minister and Cabinet.

A new Northern Australia Strategic Partnership comprising the Prime Minister and the Premiers of Queensland and Western Australia and the Chief Minister of the Northern Territory was established, to provide leadership on the development of northern Australia and inform the development and implementation of the White Paper.

== The Paper ==
In June 2015, the Abbott government released the first ever White Paper on Developing Northern Australia. The Paper contained policy proposals for the development of the north as an "economic powerhouse" over the next two decades, and examined new roads, studies of dam sites, changes to land-use laws as part of a development blueprint.

Elements of the push for northern development included boosting links with the Asia-Pacific economies; a $600 million roads package; money to upgrade airstrips and explore rail freight options; a $100 million beef roads fund and a $5 billion concessional loans facility; a $200 million water infrastructure fund and a plan to study river systems for dams viability; support for native title bodies and new surveys to start simplifying land arrangements for economic investment; and a $75 million Cooperative Research Centre.

== See also ==
- Northern Australia Beef Roads Program
- Northern Australia Roads Program
- Agricultural Competitiveness White Paper
- Savannah Way
