= Bulk billing =

Health care subsidy in Australia

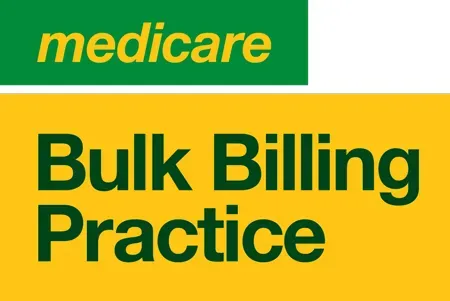
Medicare Bulk Billing Practice logo

Bulk billing is a payment agreement under Australia's universal health insurance scheme where the health professional accepts the Medicare rebate as the full and only charge for the service, making the service free for eligible patients at the point-of-care. Bulk billing is at the discretion of the health professional but may attract additional payments to encourage the practice. The dollar-figure paid to the health professional is dependent on which Medicare Benefits Schedule item codes applies.

Bulk billing rebates may be collected and paid directly to the service provider, or the service provider may collect the equivalent fee from the patient, leaving the patient to claim the rebate online, over the telephone, by mail, or at a Medicare office. Increasingly, service providers offer electronic lodgement at the practice using EFTPOS.

== Decline in bulk billing ==
Service providers may choose whether or not to use bulk billing. In January 2023, it was reported that only 42.7% of general practitioners bulk billed, while outside of Sydney and Melbourne less than a third bulk billed. In the Australian Capital Territory and Tasmania, only 5% and 6.9% of GPs bulk billed respectively. The key purpose of bulk billing is to provide an economic constraint on medical fees and charges.

To address the decline in bulk billing, the Australian Medical Association (AMA) called on the federal government to revise indexation to ensure rebates better reflect the rising costs of providing medical care and running a practice, which it says would encourage more GPs to bulk-bill. The president of the AMA said that "the average government contribution to Medicare claims have fallen in real terms by more than 5 per cent over the past two decades, placing significant cost pressures on doctors."

== 2014 co-payment proposal ==
In the 2014 Australian federal budget, the Abbott government proposed to impose a $7 co-payment for all bulk billed GP and medical test visits. The proposal was to reduce the medicare rebate payable to service providers by $5 (which applies to all consultations, and not just bulk billed ones) with the additional $2 paid by patients also going to providers. The proposal was widely criticised. In March 2015, the Health Minister Sussan Ley announced that "we are not pursuing it at all" with Prime Minister Tony Abbott declaring the co-payment was "dead, buried and cremated".
