= Abbott government =

Australian government (2013–2015)

Abbott government

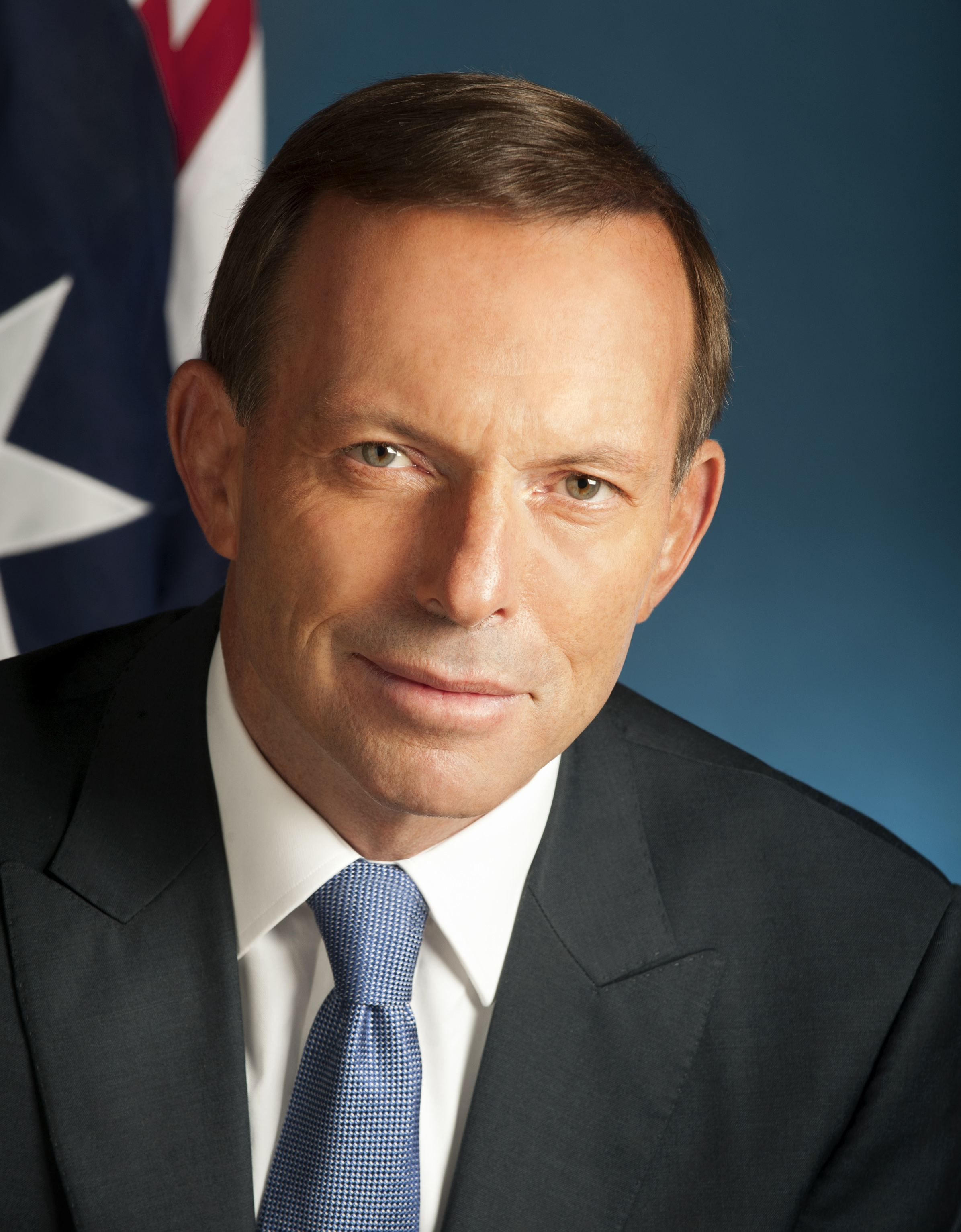

In office
- 18 September 2013 – 15 September 2015
- Monarch: Elizabeth II
- Governor-General: Dame Quentin Bryce; Sir Peter Cosgrove
- Prime Minister: Tony Abbott
- Deputy: Warren Truss
- Party: Liberal and National (Coalition)
- Status: Majority
- Origin: Coalition wins 2013 federal election
- Demise: Abbott loses 2015 Liberal leadership spill
- Predecessor: Rudd government (II)
- Successor: Turnbull government

The Abbott government was the federal executive government of Australia led by the 28th Prime Minister Tony Abbott. The government was made up of members of the Liberal–National Coalition. The Leader of The Nationals, Warren Truss, served as Deputy Prime Minister. Following the 2013 Australian federal election held on 7 September, the Coalition defeated the second Rudd government, ending six years of Labor government. The Abbott government was sworn into office on 18 September 2013. Less than two years later on 14 September 2015, Malcolm Turnbull defeated Abbott in a leadership ballot, 54 votes to 44 and the Turnbull government became the executive government of Australia.

In economic policy, the Abbott government aimed to rein in a budget deficit that reached A$48.5 billion by June 2014. It concluded free trade agreements with China, Japan and South Korea. It removed the Rudd-Gillard era Resource Super Profits Tax and carbon pricing. It established the National Commission of Audit to advise on restoring the Budget to surplus; instituted the Royal Commission into Trade Union Governance and Corruption; founded the Medical Research Future Fund; and produced White Papers on Developing Northern Australia and the Agricultural Competitiveness. Treasurer Joe Hockey delivered two Budgets, the first focused on expenditure reduction measures, but faced a hostile reception in the Senate and media. Partial deregulation of universities, and a $7 contribution to doctor visits were proposed, but blocked by the Senate. The second Budget emphasised stimulus for the small business sector.

Abbott campaigned in opposition and in office to halt the people smuggling trade, and unauthorised maritime arrivals ceased during his term of office under Operation Sovereign Borders. In foreign policy, Australia continued its military engagement in the Middle-East, amid the worsening Syrian conflict. In 2015, The Abbott government agreed to resettle an additional 12,000 refugees from the region. Abbott and Foreign Minister Julie Bishop challenged Russia at the United Nations over the shooting down of Malaysian Flight MH17 in Ukraine. The government launched the New Colombo Plan to encourage educational exchange with the Indo-Pacific region.

Domestically, Abbott campaigned for recognition of Indigenous Australians in the Australian Constitution, flagging a referendum for 2017, and promised a plebiscite on the issue of same-sex marriage. Investments in air and road infrastructure were prioritised. Many of Abbott's proposed policies were opposed by the Australian Senate which was, during the Abbott government, controlled by opposition parties. The 2013 election saw the emergence of the right-wing Palmer United Party, which lead to fears that conservative voters would defect from supporting Abbott's Liberal coalition, but Palmer United fractured soon after. The Liberal Party faced Cabinet leaks and early leadership instability, after a poorly received first Budget and amid media criticism. Abbott became the shortest-serving Australian Prime Minister since William McMahon, when his government was succeeded by the Turnbull government. Turnbull cited Newspoll results and "economic leadership" as reasons for mounting his challenge against Abbott.

== Background ==
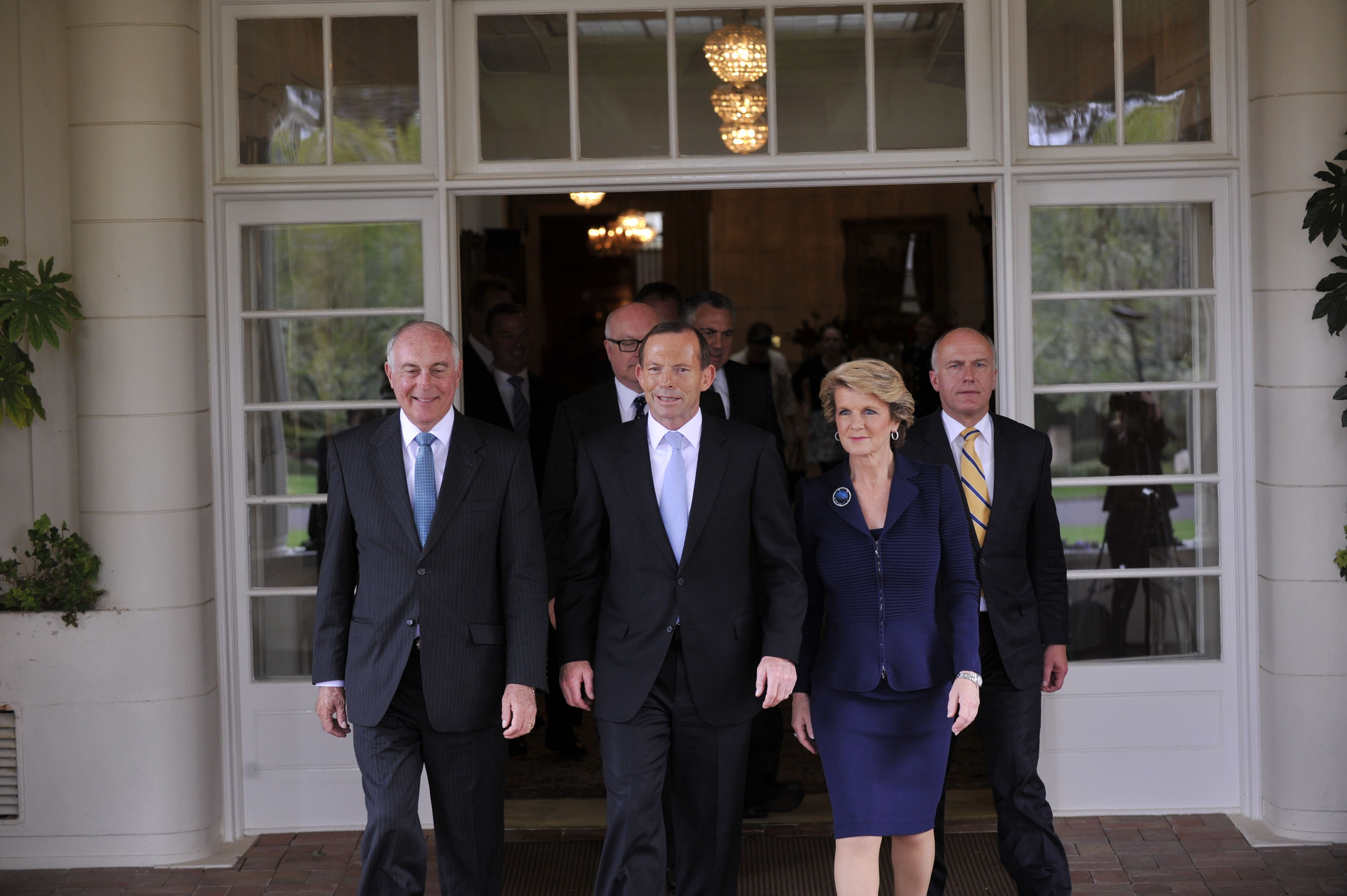
Senior members of the government following their swearing-in ceremony: Warren Truss, Tony Abbott, Julie Bishop, and Eric Abetz.

The Liberal–National coalition, led by Abbott, won the 2013 Australian federal election, returning their Coalition to power after six years in opposition. Abbott, a Rhodes Scholar, and former trainee Catholic priest, journalist and political advisor, had entered Parliament in 1994 as the Member for Warringah and served as a senior minister in the Howard government, which lost office at the 2007 election to the Australian Labor Party, led by Kevin Rudd. Abbott served as Shadow Minister for Indigenous Affairs under Liberal leaders Brendan Nelson and Malcolm Turnbull and then became Leader of the Opposition following a 2009 leadership spill in which he defeated the incumbent leader, Turnbull, by one vote.

Rudd did not complete his first term in office, having been replaced by Julia Gillard following an internal Labor party leadership vote in June 2010. Abbott led the Coalition to the 2010 federal election, which saw the Gillard government narrowly retain office by forming a minority government with the support of four crossbench MPs after the election produced a hung parliament. Leadership instability in the Labor Party continued, and Gillard was replaced by Rudd following a Labor ballot conducted shortly before the 2013 election.

As Opposition Leader, Abbott opposed the Rudd–Gillard government's introduction of a mining profits tax, and emissions trading scheme and carbon tax, and criticised the handling of asylum seeker policy. He offered support to the Gillard government's National Disability Insurance Scheme, and matched the government on its first four years funding for the Gonski restructuring of education funding. He took a proposal for an expanded paid parental leave scheme, part funded by a levy on big business, to the 2010 and 2013 elections. If elected, he promised to instigate a referendum to give recognition to Indigenous Australians in the Australian Constitution, and to prioritise indigenous affairs by placing it within the department of prime minister and cabinet, saying: "There will be, in effect, a prime minister for Aboriginal affairs". In his 2013 election campaign, Abbott told the media that the Coalition wanted to "build a stronger economy so that everyone can get ahead. We'll scrap the carbon tax, end the waste, stop the boats and build the infrastructure and the roads of the 21st century."

== 2013 election ==
The Liberal Party under Abbott, together with the National Party, led by Warren Truss, achieved a 3.65-point two-party-preferred swing at the 2013 election, winning 90 of the Australian House of Representatives seats compared with the Labor Party's 55. The Greens retained their one seat in the chamber, with Bob Katter of Katter's Australian Party also returned. Two independents won seats in the House, and the seat of Fairfax fell from the Nationals to Clive Palmer, leader of the newly formed Palmer United Party.

The emergence of the fledgling Palmer United Party was a notable feature of the election. The new party secured a House of Representatives seat and three senators (although two senators subsequently split from the party). The Greens, which had been in alliance with Labor for the preceding three years, lost one senator and a third of their vote under new leader Christine Milne. The party had campaigned heavily against Abbott and promised to block his key election commitment to abolish the carbon tax it had jointly introduced with the Gillard government.

The Australian Electoral Commission successfully petitioned the High Court for the West Australian Senate election to be declared void, on account of 1,375 ballot papers lost during a recount after the election. The initial count had declared the Liberals and Labor winners of four of six seats, with remaining two going to Zhenya Wang of the Palmer United Party, and Labor's Senator Louise Pratt. The faulty recount narrowly gave the final two seats to Wayne Dropulich of the Australian Sports Party, and to the Greens' Senator Scott Ludlam. In February 2014, the High Court ordered a new Senate election for Western Australia.

== Appointments ==
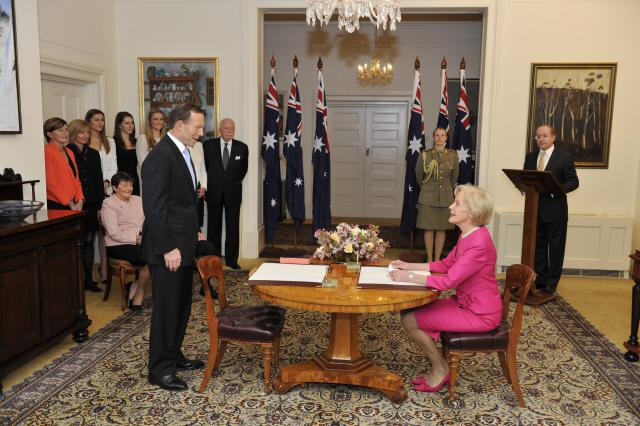
Tony Abbott is sworn in by Governor-General Quentin Bryce

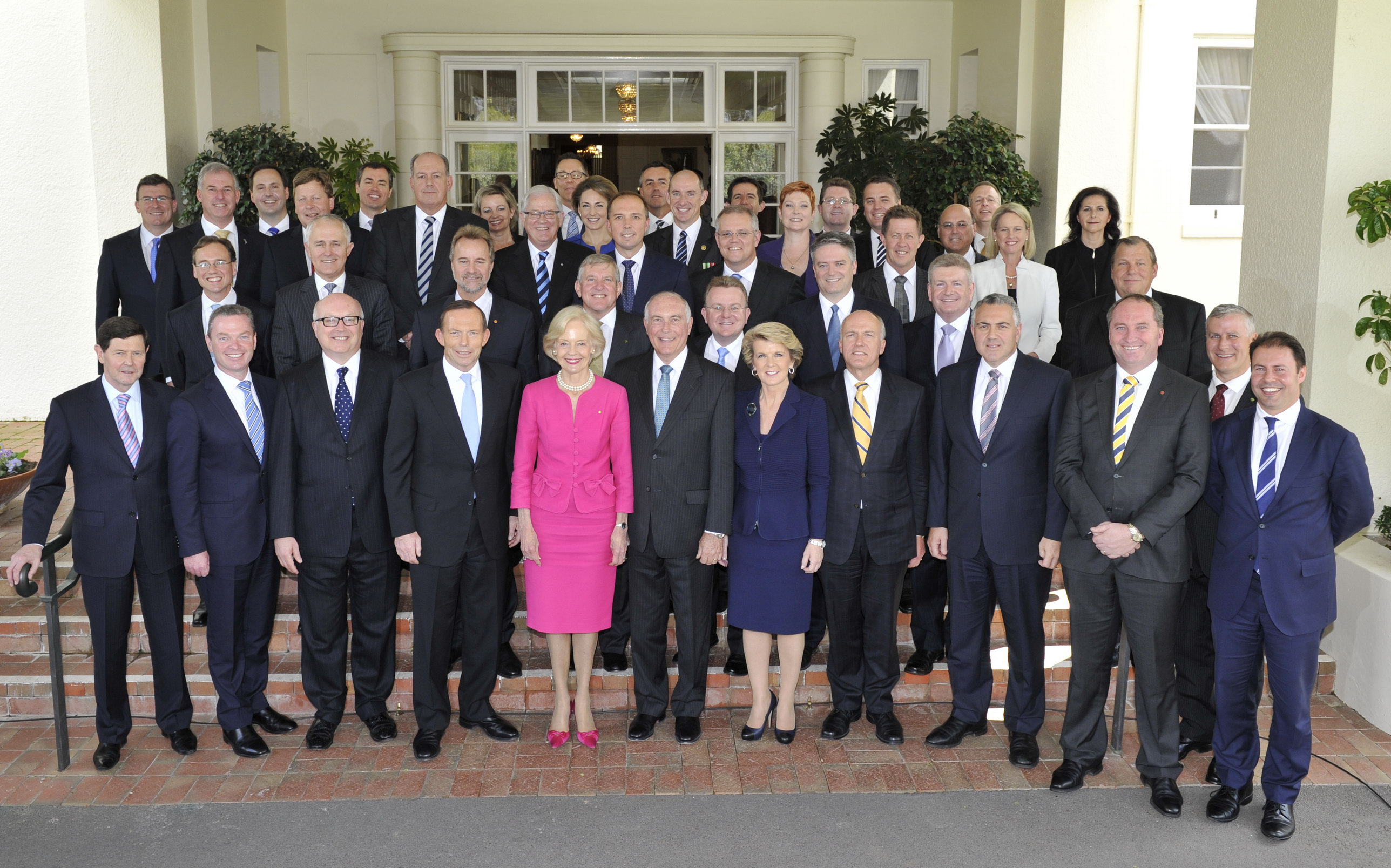
The Abbott government after being commissioned by Quentin Bryce on 18 September 2013.

Governor-General Quentin Bryce officially commissioned the Abbott ministry on 18 September 2013. Fifteen of Abbott's ministers had served in the Howard government. The Leader of the National Party, Warren Truss, became Deputy Prime Minister, Joe Hockey assumed the post of Treasurer and Deputy Liberal Leader Julie Bishop became the first woman appointed Foreign Minister of Australia. Senator Mathias Cormann was promoted to the position of Minister for Finance.

Of the three female members of the Abbott Shadow Cabinet, Julie Bishop retained her position in Foreign Affairs following the 2013 election, while Bronwyn Bishop became Speaker of the Australian House of Representatives, and the Shadow Industry Minister Sophie Mirabella lost her seat at the election. Bronwyn Bishop resigned as Speaker in 2015. Julie Bishop remained the only woman in Cabinet until Sussan Ley was appointed to Cabinet to replace Peter Dutton as Health and Sport Minister in 2014 when Dutton was made Immigration Minister in Abbott's Cabinet revision. Five other women were appointed to posts in the outer ministry, and one of the twelve parliamentary secretaries is female. Philip Ruddock, the longest serving member in the Parliament, was appointed Chief Government Whip. Eric Abetz retained the portfolio of Employment, George Brandis was appointed Attorney-General, Christopher Pyne as Education Minister, and Abbott's former leadership rival Malcolm Turnbull took Communications.

In his speech following his swearing-in ceremony, Abbott said his government would "strive to govern for all Australians": "We won't forget those who are often marginalised; people with disabilities, Indigenous people and women struggling to combine career and family. We will do our best not to leave anyone behind. We hope to be judged by what we have done rather than by what we have said we will do."

The Abbott ministry was not announced for an unusually long period and the Agence France Presse reported that Abbott had set out to stamp a "markedly different style on government" standing "in stark contrast to the 'chaos' he liked to accuse his Labor predecessors of fomenting as almost hourly soundbites, lengthy press conferences and briefings were cranked out in an effort to control the 24-hour news cycle".

Responsibility for women's policies and programs was moved from the Department of Families, Housing, Community Services and Indigenous Affairs into the Prime Minister's Office, with Michaelia Cash appointed Minister Assisting the Prime Minister for Women. The ministry also divided responsibilities for science between the portfolios of Education, under Christopher Pyne, and Industry, under Ian McFarlane. The December 2014 Cabinet reshuffle saw Ian McFarlane become the Minister for Industry and Science.

== Term of government ==
=== Foreign affairs ===
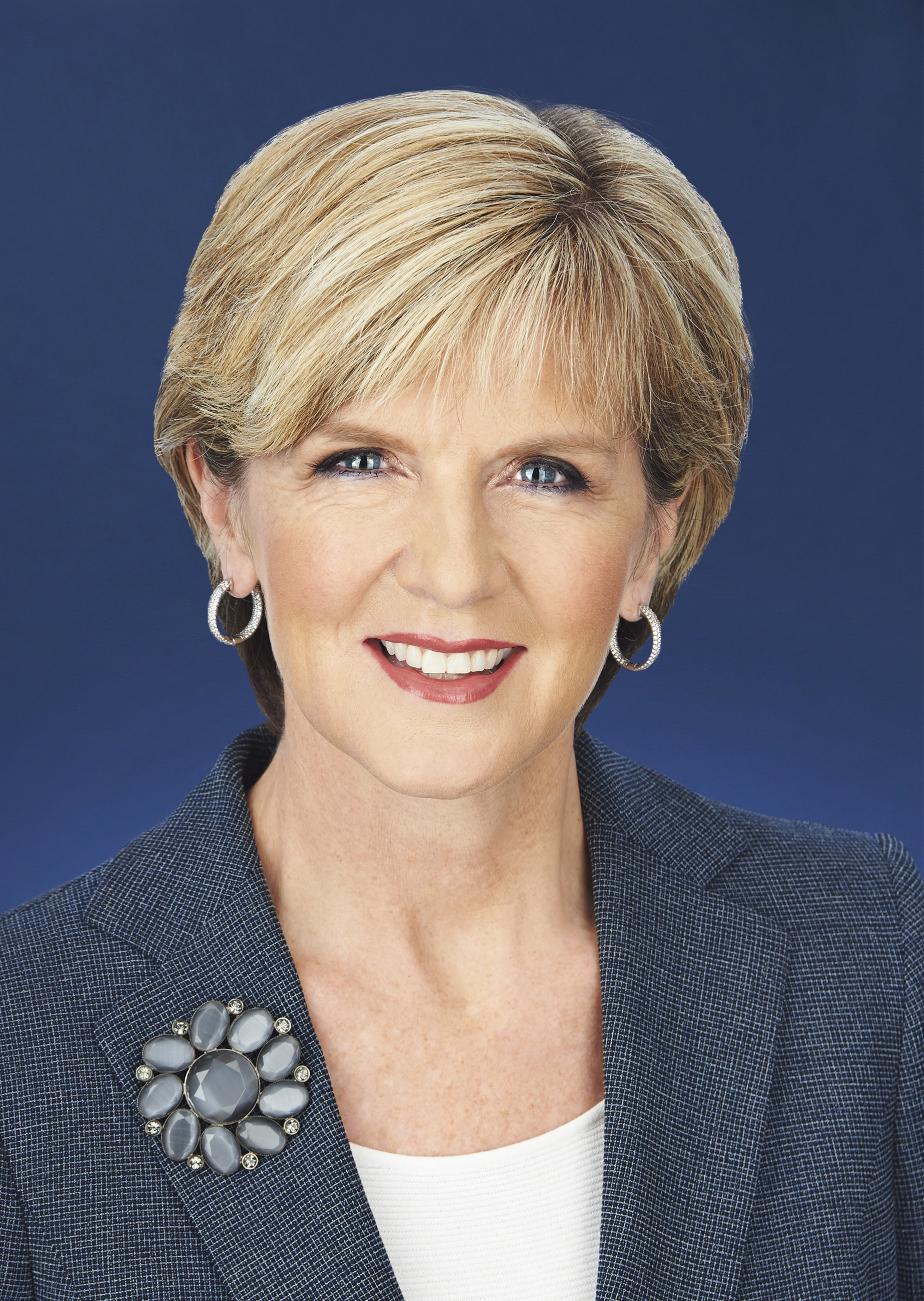
Minister for Foreign Affairs and Deputy Liberal Leader, Julie Bishop.

Julie Bishop became the first woman to represent Australia as Minister for Foreign Affairs. In Opposition, Abbott and Bishop pledged that a Coalition government would shift Australia's foreign policy focus to be "less Geneva, more Jakarta". Abbott chose the Indonesian capital as his first overseas destination, and travelled to Jakarta on 30 September 2013, to meet with President Susilo Bambang Yudhoyono on 30 September 2013.

In October, Abbott returned to Indonesia to attend his first APEC leaders' summit, to discuss trade and economic relations and meet with Chinese President Xi Jinping, US Secretary of State John Kerry and other world leaders. Following the summit, Abbott travelled to Bali, where he laid a wreath at the memorial of the 2002 Bali bombing. He also announced a commitment to extend compensation to Australian victims of terrorist attacks, allowing payments of up to A$75,000 to those who suffered in attacks on New York, London, Egypt, Mumbai, Jakarta, Bali and Nairobi since 2001. In Brunei, Abbott also attended his first East Asia Summit with world leaders, including India's Prime Minister Manmohan Singh.

In 2013, prior to the election of the Abbott government, US intelligence leaker Edward Snowden had been granted asylum by Russia after handing over large amounts of confidential information from US government databases to world media. Australian–Indonesian diplomatic relations began to suffer in the early months of the government, as The Guardian and ABC News began to publish material, which had been made public due to Snowden's leaking, suggesting that Australian spy agencies during the term of the previous government had spied on the Indonesian President and his wife. The alleged spying had taken place soon after the July 2009 bombing of Jakarta's Marriott and Ritz-Carlton hotels. Indonesia recalled its ambassador over the affair.

==== Shooting down of MH17 ====
During the 2014 Russian military intervention in Ukraine, Malaysia Airlines Flight 17 was shot down in a missile attack. Julie Bishop and Australia's UN Ambassador Gary Quinlan led negotiations at the United Nations Security Council to adopt a unanimous resolution, demanding that the armed groups in control of the crash site refrain from interfering with it and allow for the repatriation of victims and an international investigation into the attack. Bishop was honoured by The Netherlands for her role in securing the resolution and investigation.

The downing of the flight had resulted in 298 deaths, including 38 Australian citizens and residents. In the lead up to the 2014 G20 meeting in Brisbane, Tony Abbott focused world attention on Russia's role in the shooting down of the civilian plane. In a meeting with Russian President Vladimir Putin at the APEC meeting in Beijing, Abbott reportedly told the president that Australia had information that the missile that destroyed the plane had Russian origin and that Russia should consider apologising and offering appropriate restitution to the victims of the shooting. Russia continued to deny involvement.

=== Trade ===
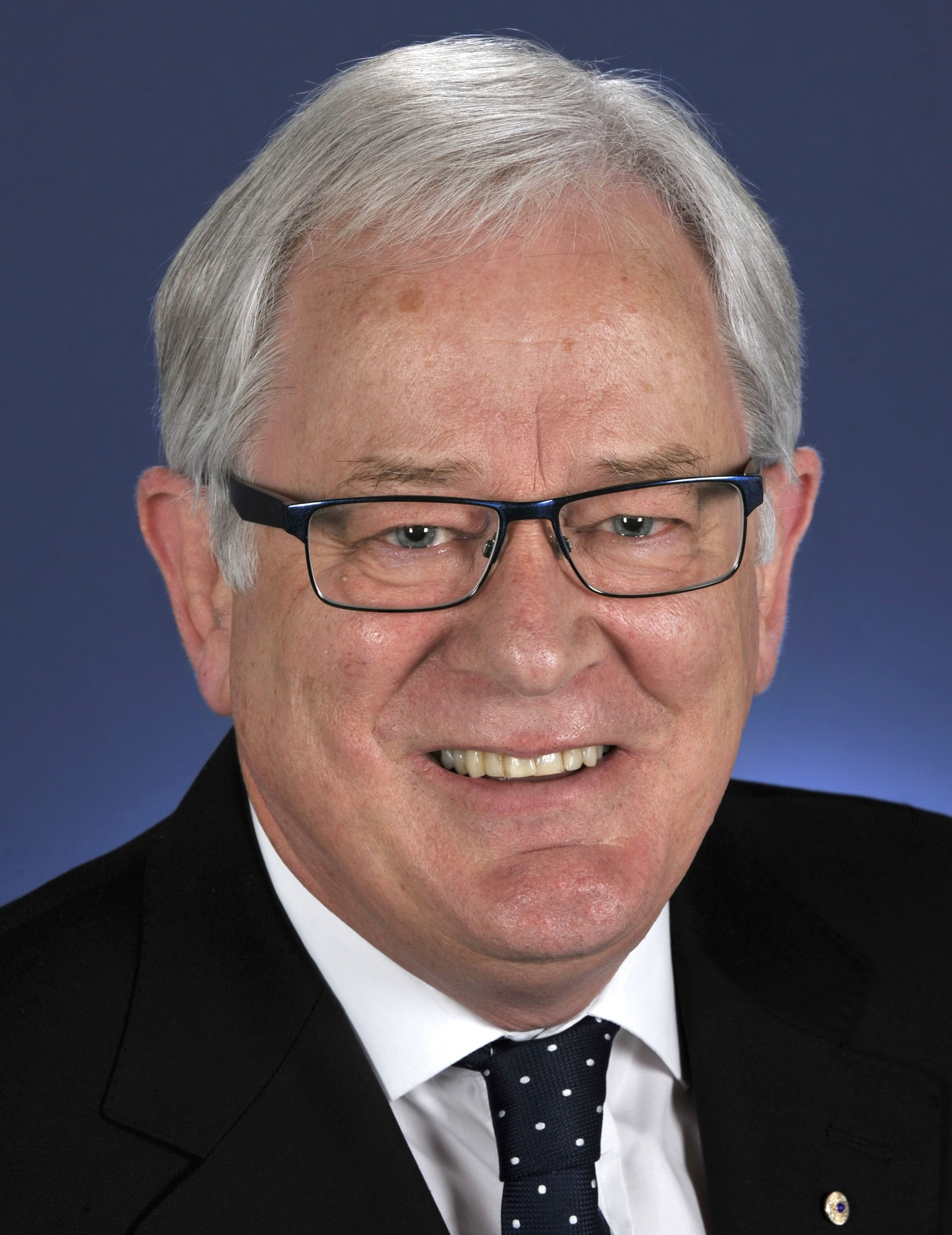
Trade Minister Andrew Robb.

Andrew Robb served as Minister for Trade and Investment. In April 2014, Abbott led a trade delegation to Japan, South Korea and China. The three economies accounted for more than half of all of Australia's two-way trade. By the close of his tenure, Abbott's government had struck free trade agreements with the three nations.

The Abbott government also established the Germany-Australia Advisory Group, to advise on improving trade relations, and pursued trade agreements with Indonesia and India.

==== Free trade agreements ====
===== Japan–Australia Economic Partnership Agreement =====
On the Japanese leg of the 2014 trade mission, Abbott agreed the key elements of a free trade agreement with the government of Shinzo Abe. A number of concessions were secured for Australian agricultural exporters, while Australian tariffs on electronics, whitegoods and cars were to be lowered. Negotiations for the agreement began under the Howard government in 2007. Abbott said, "This is the first time that Japan has negotiated a comprehensive economic partnership agreement or free trade agreement with a major economy, particularly a major economy with a strong agricultural sector." Abe travelled to Australia in July to sign the Japan–Australia Economic Partnership Agreement, and address the Australian Parliament.

===== Australia Korea Free Trade Agreement =====
On the South Korean leg of the mission, Abbott signed the Australia Korea Free Trade Agreement (KAFTA) with the government of Park Geun-hye in Seoul. The agreement reduced tariffs on primary products and reset the foreign investment review threshold to more than $1 billion.

===== China–Australia Free Trade Agreement =====
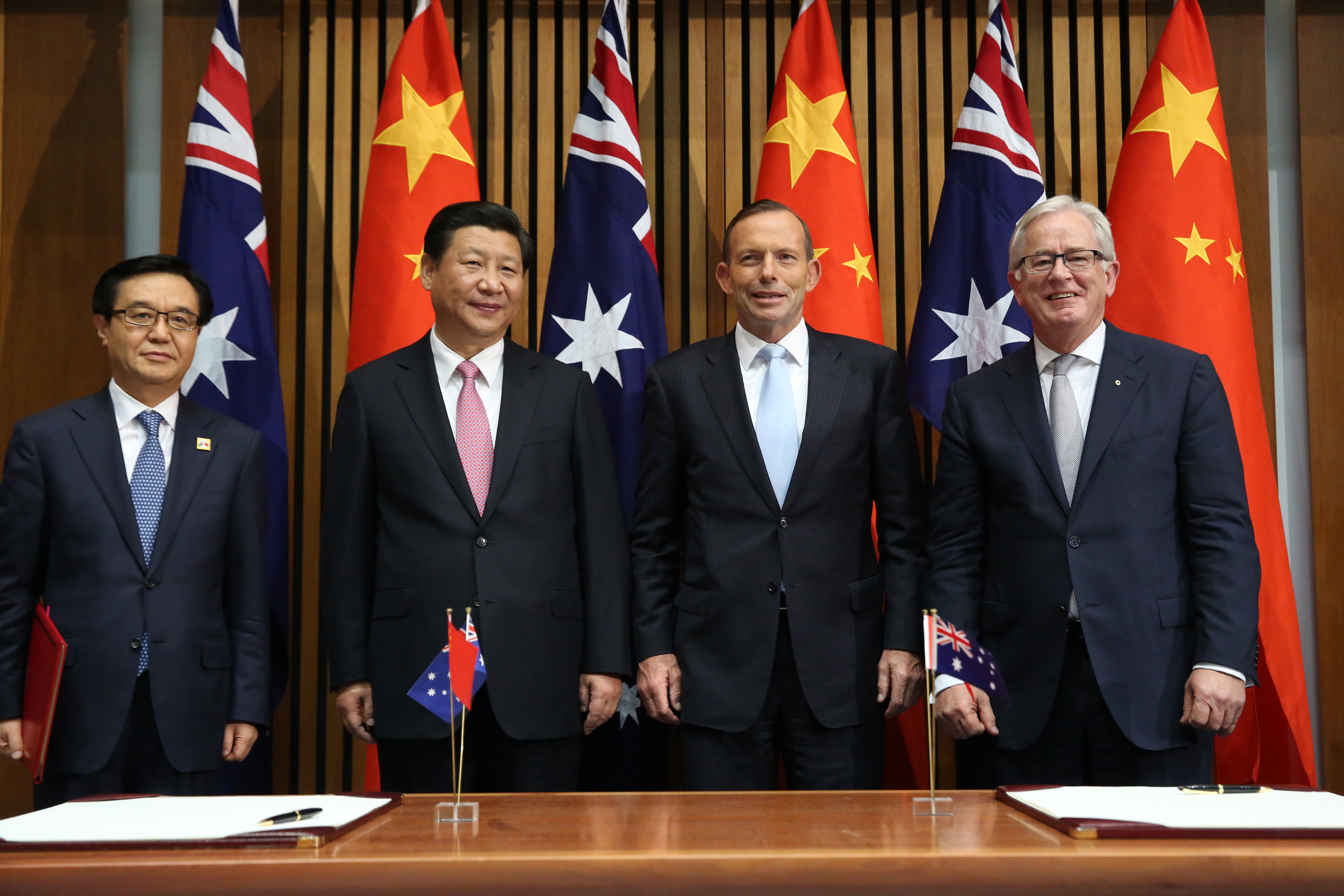
Prime Minister Abbott and Trade Minister Andrew Robb signing the Free Trade Agreement with Chinese President Xi Jinping and Minister for Commerce Gao Hucheng.

The Abbott trade mission continued on to China, where he met with Premier Li Keqiang and President Xi Jinping. In an address to the Boao Forum, Abbott said "Team Australia" is in China to "help build the Asian century". He was accompanied by Foreign Minister Bishop, Trade Minister Robb, five of Australia's state premiers, and 30 of the country's senior business executives. Abbott also discussed the search for missing Malaysia Airlines flight MH370, being led by Australia. Abbott announced military co-operation between the China and Australia would be developed to include high-level meetings, staff exchanges and joint exercises. He also announced that President Xi would address the Australian Parliament in 2015.

The China–Australia Free Trade Agreement (ChAFTA) was signed in Canberra on 17 June 2015, by Andrew Robb, and the Chinese Commerce Minister, Gao Hucheng. Abbott hailed the agreement, saying that, along with the Korean and Japan agreements, it would underpin Australia's prosperity in coming years. Labor campaigned against the agreement during the Canning by-election, but subsequently agreed to support the Turnbull government in ratifying the FTA.

=== Defence ===
The Abbott government period saw the continued wind down of Australia's involvement in the Afghanistan conflict and moves to enhance co-operation with China, Japan and the United States in regional defence operations, but also saw the deterioration of the Syrian Civil War and rise of the threat of Islamic State, along with an ongoing Islamist terrorism threat to Australia and its allies. Abbott committed to increasing Defence spending to two per cent of GDP within a decade. David Johnston served as Minister for Defence until December 2014, when he was replaced by Kevin Andrews.

At the end of October 2013, Abbott travelled to Afghanistan with opposition leader Bill Shorten for a special ceremony at the Australian base in Tarin Kowt in Uruzgan, saying that "Australia's longest war is ending. Not with victory, not with defeat, but with, we hope, an Afghanistan that is better for our presence here." Afghan forces were scheduled to take over running of the camp in mid-December.

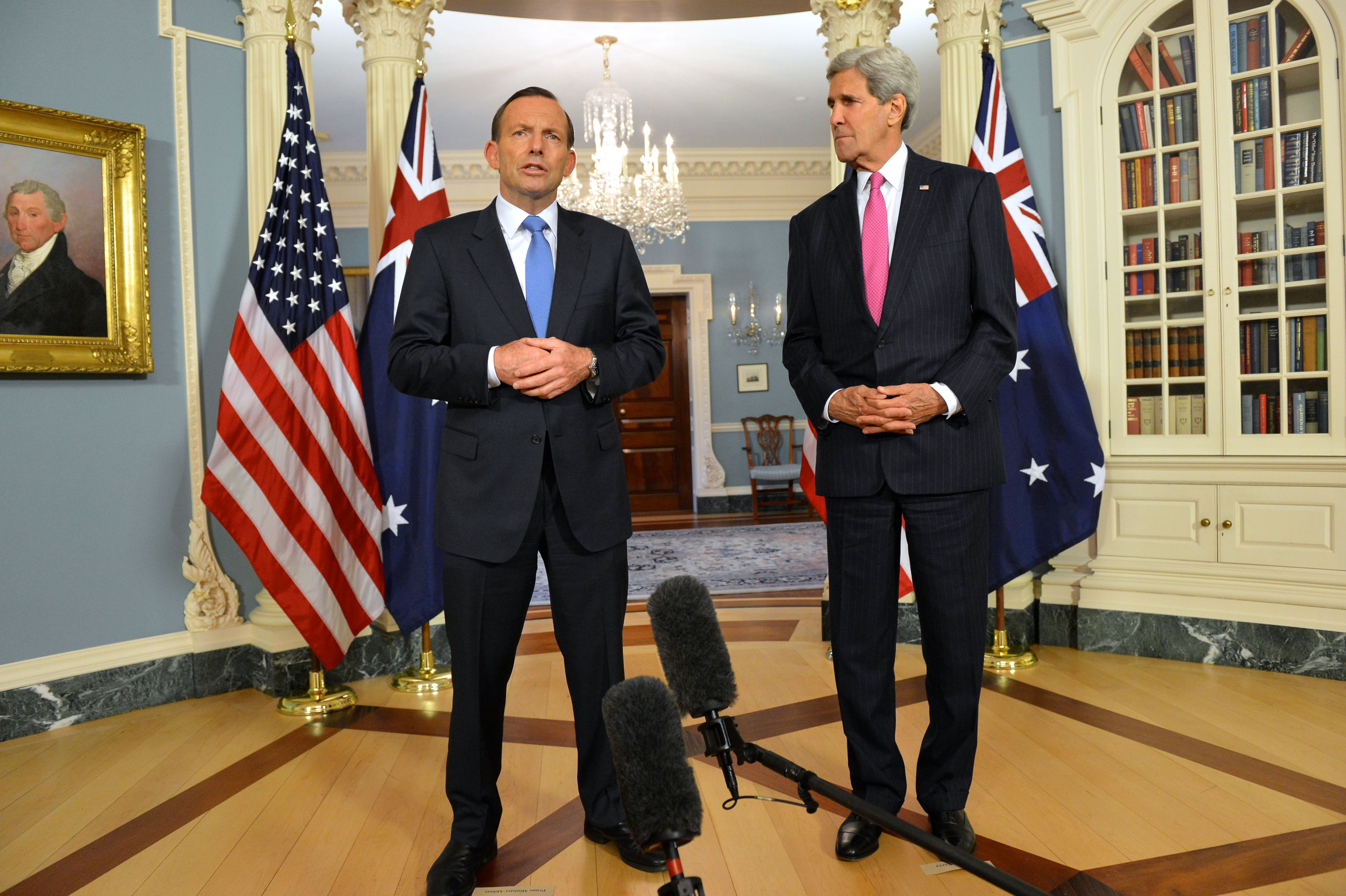
Tony Abbott with US Secretary of State John Kerry in June 2014.

Abbott met with US President Barack Obama in June 2014, in Washington, and approved a legal agreement for the deployment of around 1,300 US Marines to the Northern Territory, first proposed under the Gillard government. Abbott also moved to strengthen economic and defence ties with Japan, signing the Japan–Australia Economic Partnership Agreement and inviting Shinzō Abe to address Parliament and announcing a transfer of defence technology and equipment would be included in it.

In 2014, the government announced the investment of $12 billion in F-35 joint strike fighters.

Submarine construction

Fairfax Political Editor Mark Kenny attributed the anti-Liberal swing in the 2014 Fisher state by-election in South Australia to Federal factors associated with the Defence Portfolio, writing: "People on both sides of the aisle in Adelaide say the dominant factor was the Abbott government's perceived intention to buy submarines 'off the shelf' from Japan rather than build the high-tech vessels in South Australia as had been promised."

Days prior to the by-election, the Defence Minister David Johnston had denounced the capabilities of the Australian Submarine Corporation which wanted to construct Australia's new submarine fleet at Adelaide, saying the company was at least $350 million over budget in building three air warfare destroyer ships: "You wonder why I'm worried about ASC and what they're delivering to the Australian taxpayer, you wonder why I wouldn't trust them to build a canoe?" the Minister told Parliament. Labor campaigned at the by-election on the issue, and linked Abbott to the state vote. Labor won the traditionally Liberal seat by just five votes from a 7.27 percent two-party swing to go from minority to majority government.

MH370 search

On 8 March 2014 Malaysian Airlines Flight MH370 disappeared and presumably crashed somewhere in the Indian Ocean, within Australia's search and rescue zone. Consequently, the Chinese and Australian militaries co-operated in the search for the missing plane, and in April 2014 the People's Liberation Army asked to operate under Australian command in the largest international exercises in which it had ever participated. The Fairfax press reported: "It is believed to be the first time the PLA would operate under Western command in a military exercise".

Islamic State deployment

Following the Arab Spring uprisings, and withdrawal of the bulk of US troops from Iraq, the threat of Islamic State/ISIL/ISIS emerged, amid the deteriorating Syrian Civil War. The extremist Sunni Islamist group was battling government forces in Syria and Iraq, with the objective of establishing of an Islamic caliphate across the region. Domestic terrorist attacks by ISIS supporters occurred in Australia in 2014, with knife and gun attacks in Melbourne and Sydney against police and civilians. In October 2014, the Federal cabinet approved the decision to launch air strikes in Iraq in response to concerns over ISIL militant groups. Abbott announced that the Australian mission was to "disrupt and degrade" Islamic State "at home and abroad".

According to Defence analyst and Abbott confidant Catherine McGregor, Abbott was frustrated at the lack of a serious effort to destroy ISIS and wanted to approach the British and the French to join him in lobbying the Obama Administration to escalate its campaign against the Islamic State, and to deploy Australian Special Forces to find and kill ISIS leaders. In September 2015, the Abbott government expanded Australia's military mission, by joining US-led airstrikes against IS targets in Syria, and announced that 12,000 additional refugees from the region would be accepted. Shortly after losing office, Abbott gave this appraisal of the battle against Islamic State:

The rise of Daesh has turned it into a fight between bad and worse: the Assad regime whose brutality is the Islamic State death cult's chief local recruiter; and a caliphate seeking to export its apocalyptic version of Islam right around the world. Given the sheer scale of the horror unfolding in Syria, Iraq and everywhere Daesh gains a foothold – the beheadings, the crucifixions, the mass executions, the hurling off high buildings, the sexual slavery – and its perverse allure across the globe, it's striking how little has been done to address this problem at its source. The United States and its allies, including Britain and Australia, have launched airstrikes against this would-be terrorist empire. We've helped to contain its advance in Iraq but we haven't defeated it because it can't be defeated without more effective local forces on the ground.

— Tony Abbott, London, 28 October 2015.

==== Terrorism ====
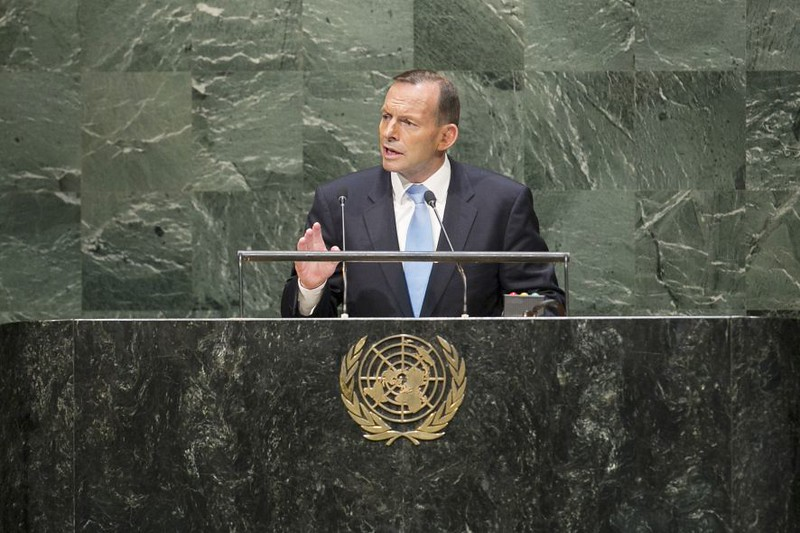
Prime Minister Tony Abbott addressing the United Nations General Assembly in 2014.

The government was concerned as early as August 2014 that the Indonesian militant Islamist terror group Jemaah Islamiah has aligned itself to ISIL (ISIS), and formed a potential threat. On 23 September, the government raised Australia's terror alert level from medium to high. In September 2014, an Islamic State supporter was shot dead after stabbing two policemen in Melbourne, and in December, an Islamic State supporter was shot dead after taking hostages and holding up a café in Martin Place, Sydney, in an attack in which two hostages died. A month later, Abbott condemned the Charlie Hebdo terror attacks in France as an "unspeakable atrocity".

When 60 people were killed in attacks in France, Tunisia and Kuwait on one day on 27 June, Abbott said: "This illustrates yet again that as far as the Daesh death cult is concerned, it's coming after us." In July, Communications Minister Malcolm Turnbull told the Sydney Institute that ISIL is not "Hitler's Germany, Tojo's Japan or Stalin's Russia" and that government should not amplify its significance.

At the opening of a regional summit against terrorism in Sydney in June 2015, Abbott praised the leadership against Islamist terrorism shown by Muslim statesmen such as Malaysia's Prime Minister Najib – who had described ISIS as "against God, against Islam and against our common humanity" – and of Egypt's president el-Sissi – who told Egyptian imams that Islam needed a "religious revolution". After losing office, Abbott said on Paul Murray Live on 8 December 2015: "We've got to work closely with live-and-let-live Muslims because there needs to be, as President (Abdel Fattah) Al-Sisi of Egypt has said, a religious revolution inside Islam... All of those things that Islam has never had – a Reformation, an Enlightenment, a well-developed concept of the separation of church and state – that needs to happen, but we can't do it; Muslims have got to do this for themselves."

=== Citizenship ===
In 2015, the cabinet debated giving the immigration minister new powers to strip dual nationals of their citizenship if they are supporters of terrorist organisations.

=== Indigenous affairs ===
Abbott, a former Indigenous Affairs Minister, reformed the portfolio and brought it within the Department of the Prime Minister and Cabinet, saying: "There will be, in effect, a prime minister for Aboriginal affairs". Northern Territory Senator Nigel Scullion was appointed the Minister for Indigenous Affairs in the Abbott Ministry. Scullion also served as Leader of the Nationals in the Senate.

In 2013, Andrew Forrest was chosen to lead a review into Indigenous employment and training programs, which was to report to the Australian government. The review was delivered on 1 August 2014, with 27 recommendations. This was the genesis of the Healthy Welfare Card initiative.

In his February 2014 "Closing the Gap" report to Parliament, Abbott said that Australia was failing to meet the "more important and the more meaningful targets" of reducing Indigenous disadvantage, and proposed to add a new target to close the gap between Indigenous and non-Indigenous school attendance within five years.

Constitutional recognition

Speaking at the Welcome to Country ceremony to mark the opening of the 44th Parliament in 2013, Abbott committed to pursuing recognition of Indigenous Australians in the Australian Constitution, and noted that the 44th parliament would have two Indigenous members. Liberal MP Ken Wyatt chaired an all-party Parliamentary Committee examining the issue, and released a report in June 2015 ahead of a bi-partisan summit.

In NAIDOC Week 2015, Abbott and Opposition Leader Bill Shorten jointly hosted a summit with around 40 indigenous leaders at Kirribilli House to discuss the process for achieving Constitutional recognition. Abbott said he hoped the wording for a referendum could be concluded in 2016, for a referendum vote in 2017.

Indigenous Advisory Council

Abbott announced the establishment of the Indigenous Advisory Council in November 2013. The government-appointed council was to meet three times a year with the Prime Minister and senior ministers to advise the government on policy implementation. Aimed at sparking "new engagement" with Indigenous Australians, the 12-member council was headed by Warren Mundine.

Remote community visits

In Opposition, Abbott promised to spend a week a year in remote indigenous communities. In September 2014, Abbott and a number of Cabinet Ministers and Departmental Heads set up camp in an Aboriginal Community in Arnhem Land, near Nhulunbuy, 600 kilometres (370 mi) east of Darwin. The Prime Minister discussed land tenure, welfare and constitutional recognition. On his August 2015 week in remote indigenous communities, Abbott again discussed constitutional recognition and became the first Prime Minister to visit the grave of land rights champion Eddie Mabo.

Funding for Indigenous affairs

The government also reduced funding to the National Aboriginal and Torres Strait Islander Legal Services (ATSILS) and associated policy officer positions in state governments, but not by as much as it had committed to during the election campaign.

In December 2013 the government announced that was unlikely to provide further funding for the elected National Congress of Australia's First Peoples, which had been established in 2010 as the national representative body for Indigenous Australians.

In June 2014, the ABC reported that the government planned to find a further $600 million in savings from Indigenous programs, in addition to the $534 million cuts in the 2014 budget.

=== Economic policy ===
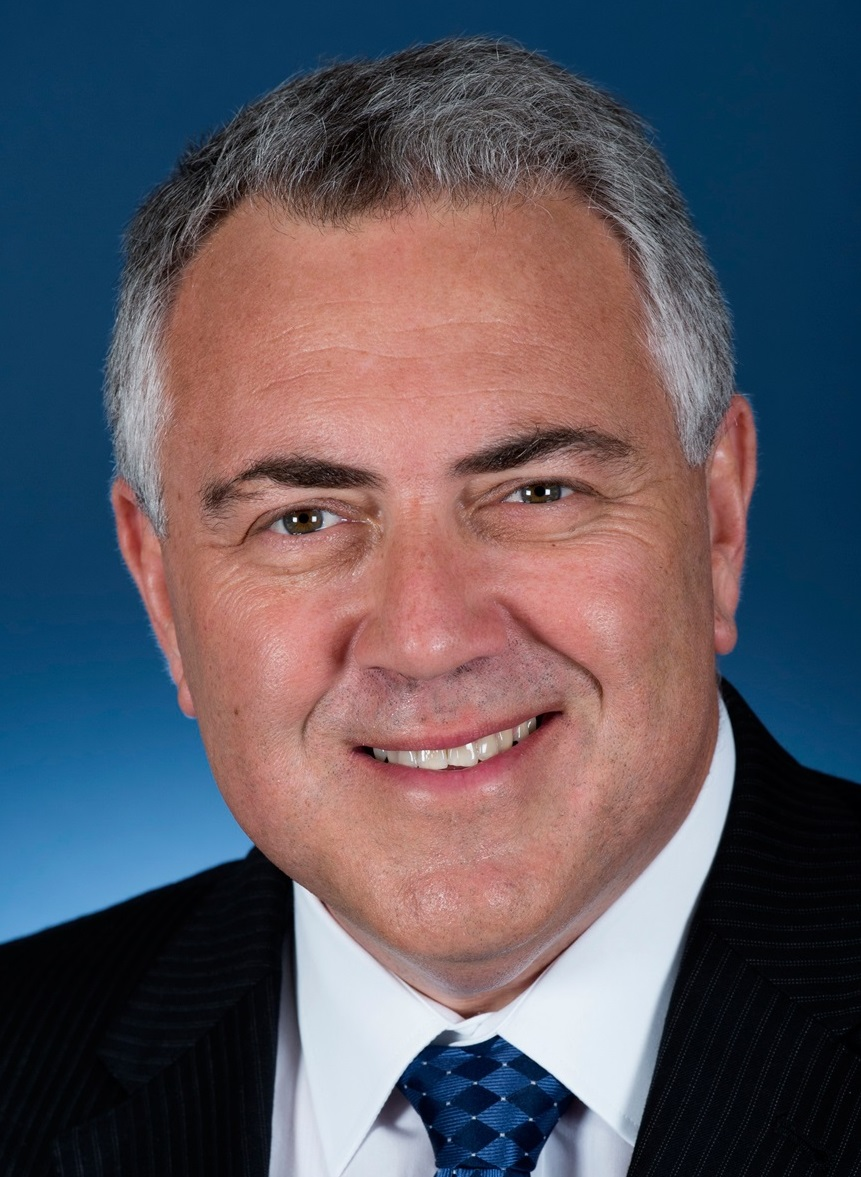
Abbott government Treasurer Joe Hockey.

2013 Election

Launching his campaign for the 2013 Election, Tony Abbott outlined the economic priorities of the Coalition, promising to tackle government debt, eliminate "waste" in government expenditure, and decrease taxes which place a burden on industry and business:

We'll build a stronger economy so everyone can get ahead. We'll scrap the carbon tax so your family will be $550 a year better off. We'll get the budget back under control by ending Labor's waste... And we'll build the roads of the 21st century because I hope to be an infrastructure prime minister who puts bulldozers on the ground and cranes into our skies.[...] The current government has turned $50 billion in the bank into debt spiralling towards $400 billion that our children and grandchildren will struggle to repay. We can't go on like this.

— Tony Abbott campaign launch speech, 2013.

Abbott promised to "cut red tape" and reduce the company tax rate. He committed to abolishing the carbon tax, to bring down power and gas prices, and to abolishing the mining tax to increase investment and employment. On industrial relations, he promised to "move the workplace relations pendulum back to the sensible centre, restore a strong cop-on-the-beat in the construction industry, and hit dodgy union officials with the same penalties as corporate crooks."

Appointments

Joe Hockey, a former Minister for Employment and Workplace Relations in the Howard government, became Treasurer of Australia, and Senator Mathias Cormann became Finance Minister in the Abbott government. Hockey had himself been a contender for the leadership of the Liberal Party in the ballot that saw Abbott win the role in 2009. Cormann had served as Shadow Assistant Treasurer and Shadow Minister for Financial Services and Superannuation. At a 27 September media conference Hockey said the government faced a challenge to sustain growth as the mining investment boom deflates, and indicated that the government was considering ways to stimulate infrastructure spending. Within the first year of their economic stewardship there were 790,000 people unemployed, with an unemployment rate of 6.4% – a 12-year high and an increase of 0.7 points from the time the government came to office. Youth unemployment rose to a 17-year high. Hockey, eleven months after coming to office, blamed the steep rise in unemployment during his stewardship on the former government.

The 2014 federal budget was released on 13 May. In 2015, the Department of Treasury released an intergenerational report, assessing the long-term sustainability of government policies based on demographic projections of Australia's population. In April, Peter Costello published an opinion piece in The Daily Telegraph describing proposed tax changes as a "morbid joke".

==== National Commission of Audit ====
The National Commission of Audit was announced by Treasurer Hockey, and the Minister for Finance, Senator Mathias Cormann, on 22 October 2013. It was established as an independent body to "review and report on the performance, functions and roles of the Commonwealth government" and to advise on eliminating wasteful spending and government inefficiency and make recommendations to achieve savings sufficient to deliver a surplus of 1 per cent of GDP prior to 2023–24. The government appointed Tony Shepherd AO to chair the commission. The other commissioners were: Dr Peter Boxall, Tony Cole, Robert Fisher and Amanda Vanstone.

==== Taxation ====
In the 2013 Election campaign, Tony Abbott promised a "comprehensive tax white paper" to look at tax reform. In June 2014, Abbott launched the Reform of the Federation white paper, with an eye to clarifying "roles and responsibilities for states and territories so that they are as far as possible, sovereign in their own sphere". In March 2015, Joe Hockey launched the Abbott government's Tax White Paper titled "Re:think". In 2015 Abbott made calls for increasing the GST to 15%.

==== Privatisation and efficiency ====
The Abbott government sought to cut spending and sell assets to rein in a budget deficit that reached A$48.5 billion by June 2014. The Australian Competition & Consumer Commission chairman recommended the selling of assets to increase productivity. The National Commission of Audit report released in May 2014 recommended sale of the postal service, along with the Royal Australian Mint and other state assets. The government raised $5.68 billion selling shares of Medibank Private, Australia's biggest health insurer (the sale was Australia's second-largest initial public offering).

The 2014 budget announced scoping studies for the privatisation of the Mint, Australian Hearing, the Australian Securities & Investments Commission (ASIC) share registry and Defence Housing Australia, with its $10 billion real estate portfolio. In the 2015 budget, the government opted to sell the ASIC share registry, but not the Mint or Defence Housing Australia.

==== Industrial Relations ====
In February 2014, Abbott announced the Royal Commission into trade union governance and corruption to inquire into financial irregularities associated with the affairs of trade unions. The Australian Workers Union, Construction, Forestry, Mining and Energy Union, Electrical Trades Union, Health Services Union and the Transport Workers Union were named in the terms of reference. The Royal Commission inquired into the activities relating to slush funds and other similar funds and entities established by, or related to, the affairs of these organisations. The Commissioner handed down his report in December 2015, finding "widespread and deep-seated" misconduct by union officials in Australia, and referring than 40 people and organisations to authorities, including police, Directors of Public Prosecutions, the Australian Securities and Investments Commission and the Fair Work Commission. The Final Report made a recommendation for the establishment of an independent body to investigate union records and finances was made, and was received by the Turnbull government

==== Northern Australia White Paper ====
The Abbott government sought to attract investment in northern Australia. In June 2015, it released the first ever White Paper on Developing Northern Australia. The Paper contained policy proposals for the development of the north as an "economic powerhous" over the next two decades, and examined new roads, studies of dam sites, changes to land-use laws as part of a development blueprint. Elements of the push for northern development included boosting links with the Asia-Pacific economies; a $600 million roads package; money to upgrade airstrips and explore rail freight options; a $100 million beef roads fund and a $5 billion concessional loans facility; a $200 million water infrastructure fund and a plan to study river systems for dams viability; support for native title bodies and new surveys to start simplifying land arrangements for economic investment; and a $75 million Cooperative Research Centre.

==== Agricultural Competitiveness White Paper ====
The Agricultural Competitiveness White Paper, released on 4 July 2015, outlined a $4 billion investment in Australian farmers and the competitiveness and profitability of the agriculture sector: The Paper announced tax changes to assist farmers and encourage investment in water infrastructure and fencing, to mitigate droughts. It also includes money for roads and dam development, to assist in production and transport to markets; and five new agricultural trade counsellors help open up overseas markets. The Paper contained an $11.4 million boost to the Australian Competition & Consumer Commission (ACCC), and the engagement of a new Agriculture Commissioner at the ACCC, to encourage fair-trading and strengthen competition in supply chains. The Paper added $300 million to the National Water Infrastructure Fund, established by the Northern Australia White Paper.

==== 2014 Budget ====
In May 2014, Joe Hockey delivered his first Federal Budget. Hockey told Parliament: "On the back of five budget deficits in a row we have inherited a further $123 billion of deficits and debt rising to $667 billion. This challenge is not of our making, but we, the women and men behind me, accept responsibility to fix it." Hockey outlined a number of proposed expenditure reductions, the abolition of the carbon and mining taxes, a Temporary Budget Repair Levy on high income earners, structural reforms to welfare and university education expenditure, the reintroduction of the fuel excise levy, and the establishment of a $20 billion Medical Research Future Fund, funded by the introduction of a $7 Medicare co-contribution. Hockey predicted, that if the measures were implemented, the budget deficit would fall from $49.9 billion to $29.8 billion over the next year.

On Budget night, economist Chris Richardson told the ABC 7.30 programme that the Budget was "a solid start towards the planned surplus while it promises some political tussles ahead." Prior to the 2013 election, Tony Abbott told SBS Television that there would be: "No cuts to education, no cuts to health, no change to pensions, no change to the GST and no cuts to the ABC or SBS." Fairfax Media reported in May that a number of Budget measures broke pre-election commitments and promises made by the Liberals in opposition. On 19 May, News Limited reported that "According to Newspoll, nearly half of voters said the measures will be lousy for the economy, and more than 60 per cent told a separate Nielsen survey the Budget was unfair."

A number of savings and revenue measures in the budget were opposed by Labor, the Greens and cross benches in the Senate. In his Budget in reply speech, Opposition Leader Bill Shorten said that Labor would oppose around $13 billion worth of cuts and tax hikes, including the changes to university funding. Initially Labor joined the Greens in opposing the reintroduction of a fuel excise levy, delaying passage of the measure until June 2015. Labor and the Greens opposed the Coalition's promised abolition of carbon pricing, and the introduction of "direct action" carbon-reduction policies, but the Government secured cross bench support for the repeal of the tax in July 2014. Labor and the Greens opposed abolition of the Rudd-Gillard mining tax, but it was repealed with the support of the Palmer United Party in September. The Government was unable to secure passage of its expanded Paid Parental Leave Scheme, or medicare co-contribution and the measures were scrapped. Education Minister Christopher Pyne continued to negotiate for passage of university funding reforms, but the measures are not supported by the Opposition and minor parties.

This budget has been described as "the beginning of the end" for the Abbott government.

==== 2015 Budget ====
In his 2015 Budget Speech, Hockey said: "On the economic front, iron ore prices have fallen dramatically and the recovery in the global economy has been weaker than expected. But I say to you, the economic plan laid down by this government more than a year ago, is in place and it is helping us to deal with these challenges." Hockey proposed significant new small business tax concessions, and said the government would increase funding for development of Australia's north, drought assistance, jobseeker assistance, national security and medical research. The GST was to be revised to include digital purchases

The ABC reported that Hockey's second budget would see a $35 billion deficit for 2015–16, with a fall to $7 billion by 2018–19. The ABC noted that Hockey had pledged $5.5 billion for small businesses and that small business would receive a 100% tax write off for assets costing less than $20,000. A crackdown on welfare fraud would bring in $1.7 billion over forward estimates, and the fight against ISIS would receive better funding.

=== Financial services policy ===
The Abbott government refused calls for a royal commission into financial planner misconduct at the Commonwealth Bank (one of the largest financial service providers in Australia) after a senate committee review into the matter found gross exploitation of bank customers. The government, which favours deregulation, intends to remove customer protections in the sector; allow advisers to earn sales commission and other so-called "conflicted remuneration" from providing general financial advice; and remove the requirement for financial advisers to tell customers how much they are receiving in commissions every year and give them the chance to opt out of the arrangements every second year. This was in addition to removing the laws that require financial advisers to act in the best interest of their clients, and the requirement that they provide clients with a statement of the fees they'll be charged each year.

=== Social policy ===
==== Adoption ====
In December 2013, Abbott launched a taskforce to help make it easier for Australians to permanently adopt children. He made the announcement flanked by NSW Premier Barry O'Farrell and actors Hugh Jackman and Deborra-Lee Furness, who supported the process.

==== Parental leave scheme ====
At the 2013 election, Abbott proposed a plan for $5.5 billion paid parental leave scheme to provide parents with 26 weeks' paid leave, at full replacement wage up to an annual salary of $150,000 (or a maximum of $75,000) – or the minimum wage if greater. The wage replacement strategy was designed to be an economic driver and boost female workforce participation rates and was intended to replace the Gillard government's $1.8 billion scheme, introduced in January 2011.

==== Same sex marriage ====
In opposition, Abbott's Coalition had voted against a same-sex marriage bill put to the Parliament, but in office Abbott indicated that, while he personally opposed redefinition of marriage, if a bill were to come before the new parliament, the Coalition party room would discuss its stance on the issue. In Government, Abbott reaffirmed that he did not support changing the law to recognise same-sex marriages. Attorney General George Brandis challenged the ACT Legislative Assembly's unilateral recognition of same-sex marriage as being inconsistent with the Federal Marriage Act and therefore unconstitutional, a view which was upheld by the High Court on 12 December 2013.

Abbott permitted Coalition members to advocate for change if they felt strongly on the issue, and indicated that if a bill were to come before the new parliament, the Coalition party room would discuss its stance on the issue. Opinion polls suggested growing support for change, and on 11 August 2015, Abbott called a Coalition Party room vote and MPs voted against allowing a free vote on the issue 66 to 33. Abbott was criticised by some pro-gay marriage Liberal MPs for holding the vote in the Coalition party room, rather than the Liberal party room. To settle the issue, Abbott proposed a plebiscite following the next election.

==== Safe Schools ====
The Safe Schools Coalition Australia was formally launched in June 2014 by the (Liberal) Abbott government. Abbott would later critize it by 2017.

==== Disaster recovery assistance ====
One day after the 2013 New South Wales bushfires destroyed 200 homes in the Blue Mountains to the west of Sydney, the government eased the criteria for receipt of the Australian Government Disaster Recovery Payment, removing financial assistance for evacuees.

=== Immigration ===
Scott Morrison was appointed Minister for Immigration and Border Protection in the Abbott Ministry. In opposition, the Coalition had been highly critical of the Labor government's Asylum Seeker policies. Campaigning for office, Morrison said that the Coalition "has always believed in immigration as one of the great nation building planks of policy" and that it would undertake measures to restore confidence in Australia's immigration program. The Abbott-led opposition had opposed the Labor government's tightening of restrictions on 457 "skilled migrant" visas, and pledged that in government, it would repeal the law and issue more 457 visas, to stimulate economic growth.

==== Refugees ====
In 2014, Australia took in 11,570 refugees from offshore, mostly through the UNHCR program, which was 11% of the global figure within the Third country resettlement category. For Third country resettlement refugees, this ranked Australia as the recipient of the third highest figure overall, and first on a per-capita basis. For total refugees, this ranked Australia 22nd overall and 28th on a per-capita basis.

In 2015, the Abbott government had been pursuing a policy of increasing its refugee intake from 13,750 people to 18,750 by 2018, but the worsening Syrian Civil War refugee crisis, led Abbott to announce an additional intake of 12,000 places for people escaping that conflict. The Government also committed to $44 million in financial aid to prepare camps for the northern winter. Abbott lost office in September, and the Turnbull government inherited the plan.

==== Asylum seekers ====
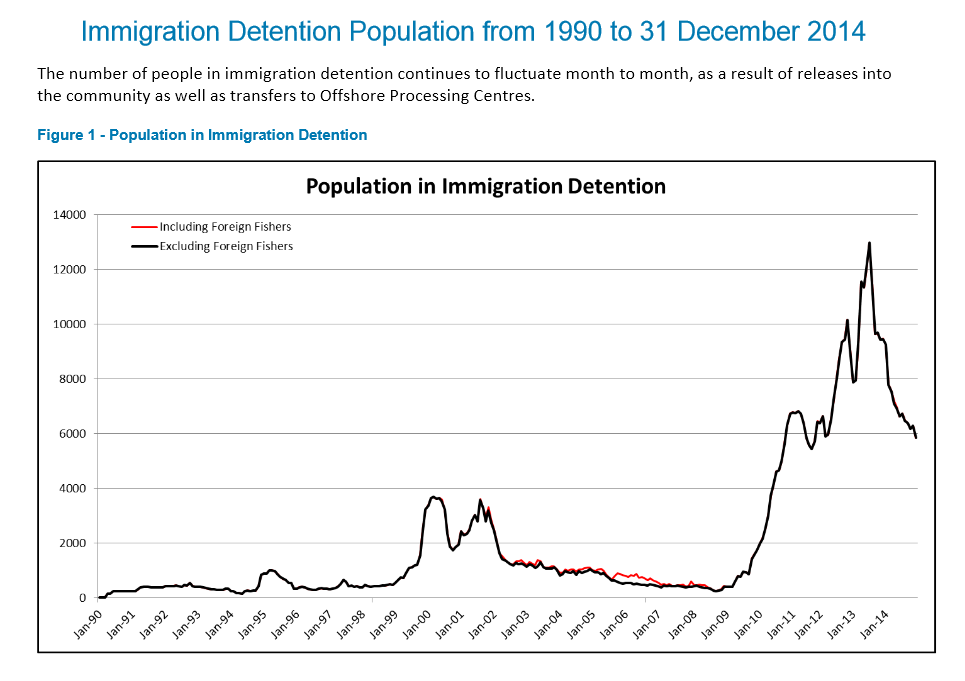
Immigration detention population to December 2014

In Opposition, Tony Abbott promised that his government would "stop the boats" within his first term of Government. Abbott had been highly critical of Labor's handling of Asylum Seeker policy, and the re-emergence of the people smuggling trade, possibly due in part to the dismantling of Howard government policies. Scott Morrison was tasked with managing the government's efforts at stemming the flow of deaths at sea, and unauthorised boat arrivals.

While it's clear that "the boats" did stop arriving (or sufficiently slow down) during the Abbott governments term, the exact cause can't be known for certain. It is likely to have been the result of policy changes enacted by the Rudd Government which continued to take effect well into the Abbott Government. An analysis by former Immigration Department chief John Menadue and Australian National University migration expert Peter Hughes regards the downturn in boat arrivals to have begun after the Second Rudd government announcement that asylum seekers would not be settled in Australia, and other measures undertaken by the Rudd government to resettle refugees elsewhere.

Regardless of the cause, the Abbott Government were able to take credit for "stopping the boats". It was considered a 'delivered' election promise as Tony Abbott simply promised that "the boats" would stop during his time in office. In April 2015, ABC Fact Check reported that Abbott's promise to stop the boats had been delivered: "The Government launched Operation Sovereign Borders on 18 September 2013, when it took office. Boats continued to arrive for the remainder of 2013, at a rate of five to seven per month. The picture changed in January 2014. Since then only one boat, carrying 157 asylum seekers, has arrived."

Operation Sovereign Borders

On the day it was sworn in, the Abbott government launched Operation Sovereign Borders, a joint agency task force designed to combat people smuggling. Deputy Chief of Army, Angus Campbell was appointed to lead the effort. The government instituted a policy of turning-back-boats where it was safe to do so, and sent arrivals to offshore processing centres. From January 2014, until the demise of the Abbott government in September 2015, only one asylum vessel was reported to have reached Australia.

In December 2014 the Abbott government passed the Migration and Maritime Powers Legislation Amendment (Resolving the Asylum Legacy Caseload) Bill 2014 (Cth) giving the immigration minister unprecedented powers to control the lives of asylum seekers. The Immigration Minister told a Senate inquiry in January 2014 that sharing of information about "on-water" tactics and intelligence should be limited in the interest of national security. That month, no new boat arrivals were recorded for the first time since the election of the Abbott government.

On 14 January 2014, Morrison announced the closure of four mainland detention centres. On 4 February 2014, he said that no asylum seeker boats had reached Australia for 36 days, which was the longest stretch in almost five years. "This is the longest period of no illegal boat arrivals since March of 2009, when arrivals first started to significantly escalate as a consequence of the former Labor Government's decision to abolish the strong border protection regime they inherited from the Howard Government", Morrison told reporters.

The government apologised to Indonesia after Australian Navy ships performing border protection tasks entered the country's waters on six occasions during December 2013 and January 2014. The incidents led to a deterioration in the relationship between the Australian Defence Force and the Indonesian National Armed Forces.

Detention Centres

On 17 February 2014 there was a riot in the Manus Island detention centre. The riot occurred amid concerns by asylum seekers in detention that their claims were not being processed. The Australian reported that asylum claims were being processed in the lead up to the Manus Island riots. It has since been reported that no such processing was occurring.

The BBC reported in December 2014 that "Rights group say conditions in the PNG and Nauru camps are totally inadequate, citing poor hygiene, cramped conditions, unrelenting heat and a lack of facilities. They say these conditions are causing physical and mental health issues among detainees" and that "Two young Iranian men have died as a direct result of their detention in PNG."

In response to a February 2015 Human Rights Commission report critical of conditions for children in detention, Abbott said "The most compassionate thing you can do is stop the boats. We have stopped the boats" and criticised the Commissioner for not investigating the issue under Labor, when hundreds of people were dying at sea and 2000 children were in detention. The detention figure had reduced to 211 under the Abbott government.

Sri Lankan and Indian vessels

In June/July 2014, reports emerged that two boats, carrying presumed Sri Lankan asylum seekers, had been intercepted in the waters between Sri Lanka and Australia. On 7 July, the Immigration Minister confirmed to the High Court that 41 asylum seekers on a boat intercepted west of the Cocos Islands had been returned to Sri Lanka, following an "enhanced screening process" at sea. Plaintiffs sought an injunction on the transfer of a further 153 asylum seekers from. The Government told the High Court there remained 157 asylum seekers, who were on an Indian flagged vessel that had departed from Pondicherry, India. These asylum seekers were transferred from Cocos Islands to Western Australia to be granted access to Indian consular officials. The Government said that when these asylum seekers "refused to meet Indian consular officials, who were to establish their identities and residency status", they were transferred to Nauru. The return of Tamil asylum seekers to Sri Lanka was controversial, as the Australian government had previously described Sri Lanka as "responsible for government-sponsored torture, abuse and mistreatment by police and security forces".

In the government's first year they spent $120,000 on domestic media monitoring on immigration and asylum seekers in the face of criticism for being an overtly secretive area of government.

=== Infrastructure ===
In the 2013 election campaign, Abbott said he wanted to be known as an "infrastructure prime minister". In his first Budget, Joe Hockey announced "Over the next six years, the government will help build new roads, rail, ports and airports" and outlined spending commitments to the East West Link, Melbourne, Toowoomba Bypass, Perth Freight Link, Midland Highway upgrade in Tasmania and the North South Road Corridor project in Adelaide and said: "our $1 billion National Stronger Regions Fund, together with $200 million of new Black Spot funding, and $350 million extra for Roads to Recovery will deliver jobs and better roads across regional and rural Australia."

In May 2015, the Abbott government released the Australian Infrastructure Audit. In his 2015 Budget speech, Hockey announced the reintroduction of Fuel Indexation to assist with funding of road-building and said: "We are rolling out the biggest infrastructure program in Australia's history, with new road and freight corridors being built right across the country".

Transport investment

In opposition, Abbott had called for less investment in "inefficient, over-manned, union-dominated, government-run train and bus systems", because "cars facilitated a sense of personal mastery public transport never would", saying "The humblest person is king in his own car." In office, Abbott withdrew some funding for planned public transport projects.

On 19 September 2013, Abbott joined NSW Premier Barry O'Farrell to jointly launch the 33-kilometre (21 mi) WestConnex motorway for Sydney.

In Victoria, Abbott supported construction of the East West Link, Melbourne. The Age reported that the timing of the provision of funds for the East West Link, the last day of the 2013–14 financial year, was criticised by federal Auditor-General Grant Hehir as a strategy to artificially blow out the deficit of the outgoing government.

Second Sydney airport

On 15 April 2014, the Abbott government announced approval for a Second Sydney Airport at Badgerys Creek, 50 kilometres (31 mi) west of the Sydney central business district, and to develop accompanying integrated infrastructure. The announcement of the A$2.5 billion project ended years of uncertainty over the site, which had been purchased by the Hawke government. Abbott predicted that the project would create 60,000 new jobs for Western Sydney by the time the airport was fully operational.

=== Science ===
The first Abbott ministry divided responsibilities for science between the portfolios of Education, under Christopher Pyne, and Industry, under Ian McFarlane. This was reported as the first ministry since 1931 to be without a dedicated Minister for Science. This drew criticism from scientific organisations including the Australian Academy of Science. The December 2014 Cabinet reshuffle saw the title Science restored, under Ian McFarlane's Ministry of Industry and Science.

In the 2014 Budget, Joe Hockey announced a commitment to build the $20 billion Medical Research Future Fund, to boost funding for medical research. However, the Budget was criticised for its $450 million reduction in funding for science agencies.

=== Media and Communications ===
Malcolm Turnbull took up the role of Minister for Communications following the election of the Abbott government. On 14 September 2015, Turnbull resigned the position to challenge Abbott's leadership of the Liberal Party.

==== ESafety Commissioner ====
The national eSafety Commissioner, a position established in July 2015 by the Abbott government, under the Enhancing Online Safety for Children Act 2015.

==== National Broadband Network ====
Tony Abbott, as Leader of the Opposition, and Malcolm Turnbull, as Shadow Minister for Communications and Broadband, stated in 2010 that in government they would 'demolish' the NBN.

In opposition, the Abbott-led Coalition was critical of the Labor government's National Broadband Network policy, and proposed to deliver "a cheaper version, more efficiently", by funding a technologically inferior fibre to the node network, rather than Labor's primarily fibre to the premises network. In opposition, the Coalition promised their alternative would deliver a minimum 25 Mbit/s to 100% of premises by 2016 and a minimum 50 Mbit/s to 100% of premises by 2019, requiring peak funding of $29.5bn. This compared to the previous government's NBN target of 100 Mbit/s to 93% of premises by 2021 and 25 Mbit/s to the remaining 7% of premises by 2016, with peak funding of $44bn. Social media activists attacked the Coalition's plan, describing it as "fraudband".

Following the 2013 election, Communications Minister Malcolm Turnbull assumed responsibility for management of the network, and invited the Labor appointed board of NBN Co to offer their resignations and announced a strategic review of the project. The review found that the Coalition's NBN would require funding of $41bn (up from $29.5bn) and that 44% of premises would receive 25 Mbit/s by 2016 (down from 100%). Turnbull, a former Rhodes Scholar and successful businessman, had previously worked in the field of internet communications, being a co-founder of OzEmail.

On 15 December 2014, the government announced that it had struck a deal with the nation's largest telecommunications provider, Telstra, to gradually acquire Telstra's copper fixed-line network for a total cost of A$11 billion. The government was able to effectively re-negotiate the former government's NBN deal with Telstra, at no additional cost to taxpayers.

==== Media relations ====
Fairfax Press and Abbott government

On 1 September 2015, Immigration Minister Peter Dutton said Fairfax Media were conducting "a bit of a jihad" against the Government, and that there was a "huge move by Fairfax at the moment to try and bring the Government down...[and Fairfax is] being helped by the ABC".

In May 2015, Fairfax political correspondent Peter Hartcher had made allegations against Tony Abbott, claiming falsely that he had snubbed the gay partner of an ambassador in Paris. Parliamentary Secretary Alan Tudge described the front-page article as a "disgraceful smear".

In July 2015, a court found that the Fairfax Press had defamed Treasurer Joe Hockey, and found Darren Goodsir, the Sydney Morning Herald's editor in chief, was "motivated by malice" in the matter.

In August 2015, the ABC Media Watch programme reported that a front-page of The Age newspaper "ripped into the recent war record of former SAS captain Andrew Hastie, Liberal candidate in the 2015 Canning by-election, which could be crucial to Tony Abbott's future" and found the coverage to be "both unfair and misleading", and likened it to the Hockey defamation case. In a 29 August article, Peter Hartcher incorrectly asserted that Tony Abbott was involved in the decision to launch a planned Border Force operation in Melbourne.

ABC & Abbott government

In a Treasurer's debate prior to the 2013 Election, Hockey told the Q&A programme spending on the ABC would be subject to review. On the eve of the Election, Abbott told SBS Television "No cuts to... the ABC or SBS." In November 2014, Communications Minister Turnbull said that the ABC and SBS, as public broadcasters, should not be exempt from spending cuts that applied to almost all government departments, and the ABC would receive a cut of 4.6 per cent cut over five years.

In early 2015, an internal ABC review of its coverage of the first Hockey Budget criticised the post-budget interview by the flagship current affairs shows 7:30 and Lateline, finding that a 7:30 interview by Sarah Ferguson showed how "perceptions of bias could be inflamed unnecessarily" and that Ferguson did not appear to show the Treasurer enough respect. It found that Lateline host Emma Alberici could have given the impression of bias by asking a Coalition MP: "Do you think voters are really stupid and can't recognise a lie when they see one?"

In June 2015, Abbott initiated a brief ministerial boycott of the Q&A programme, after it arranged for Zaky Mallah to ask a question of a Government minister, from its live studio audience. Mallah had been jailed for threatening federal government officials, and had posted violent comments about conservative female journalists on Twitter. On-air, Mallah said "The Liberals now have just justified to many Australian Muslims in the community tonight to leave and go to Syria and join ISIL". Turnbull criticised Abbott's boycott, telling 7.30: "I take the view that wherever there is an open microphone I'm happy to get on the other side of it." The ABC found that there had been an "error of judgement", but repeated the programme later in the week, prompting Abbott to say that "heads should roll" over the affair.

The hosts of the ABC's political programs spoke in favour of Abbott's demise. Kerry O'Brien and Barrie Cassidy, hosts respectively of the ABC's flagship weekly current affairs programs Four Corners and Insiders, welcomed the replacement of Abbott by Turnbull. as did ABC radio commentators Fran Kelly Paul Bongiorno and Amanda Vanstone. Fairfax and News Limited reported that Leigh Sales, the host of 7.30 gave Turnbull an unusually warm first interview following his toppling of Abbott.

2 GB radio

Conservative 2 GB radio commentators Alan Jones, Ray Hadley and Andrew Bolt criticised Turnbull's challenge to Abbott. In the 7 months following his taking of the Liberal leadership, Turnbull conducted 17 interviews at the ABC, and boycotted 2 GB Radio.

=== Environment ===
Following its election in 2013, the Abbott government created a new Department of the Environment, with Greg Hunt as Minister for the Environment. Hunt, a former Fulbright scholar, and human rights and development activist with the United Nations, had held the Shadow portfolio under successive Liberal leaders. In relation to climate change policy, Abbott had campaigned strongly against the Labor government's system of carbon pricing, and promised a "Direct Action Plan" for carbon emissions reduction. His government abolished the Gillard government's carbon tax, but committed Australia to continuing to reduce greenhouse gasses at the Paris Agreement conference.

==== Climate Change ====
On the eve of the 2013 election, Abbott outlined his stance on climate policy in an interview on the ABC TV Insiders program:

...I think that climate change is real, humanity makes a contribution. It's important to take strong and effective action against it, and that is what our direct action policy does... The important thing is to take strong and effective action to tackle climate change, action that doesn't damage our economy. And that is why the incentive-based system that we've got, the direct action policies, which are quite similar to those that president Obama has put into practice, is – that's the smart way to deal with this, a big tax is a dumb way to deal with it.

— Tony Abbott on the ABC TV Insiders prior to 2013 election.

After taking office in September 2013, Minister Hunt abolished the Gillard government advisory Climate Commission, stating that this move formed "part of the Coalition's plans to streamline government processes and avoid duplication of services" and that the Department of the Environment would take on its role.

The Abbott government announced a "Direct Action Plan" on climate change, with an overall goal to reduce Australia's emission to 5% below 2000 levels by the year 2020. In April 2014, the government released a White Paper on its plan, centred around a multi billion dollar Emissions Reduction Fund (ERF) designed to provide financial incentives to carbon emitters to reduce their emissions. The ERF was established to support a range of carbon abatement programs, including vegetation management, energy efficiency and transport.

===== Repeal of the carbon tax =====
The Gillard government's Clean Energy Act 2011 had established carbon pricing in Australia. However, Gillard had promised not to introduce a carbon tax during her 2010 election campaign, and Abbott as Opposition Leader had campaigned strongly against the legislation as a broken Labor election promise, which he promised to repeal if elected.

Abbott delivered his election promise to remove the carbon tax with the support of the Senate cross bench in July 2014.

===== 2014 United Nations Climate Change Conference at Lima =====
In December 2014 during the 2014 United Nations Climate Change Conference in Lima, the Abbott government pledged $200 million over four years to the Green Climate Fund. The government said: "The pledge to the Green Climate Fund will facilitate private sector-led economic growth in the Indo-Pacific region with a particular focus on investment in infrastructure, energy, forestry ... and emissions reduction programmes."

===== The 2014 Paris Agreement =====
In a 2014 meeting with French President Francois Hollande ahead of negotiations for the Paris Agreement on reducing global carbon emissions, Abbott said it was "vital" that the Paris conference succeed and did not become "another disaster like Copenhagen," which had agreed on only non-binding goals. "For it to be a success, we can't pursue environmental improvements at the expense of economic progress," Abbott said

In December 2015, Foreign Minister Julie Bishop represented Australia in negotiations for the Treaty, and signed on Australia's behalf. She hailed the agreement as an "historic occasion". Australia committed to implement an economy-wide target to reduce greenhouse gas emissions by 26 to 28 per cent below 2005 levels by 2030. Australia announced its ratification of the Paris Agreement on 10 November 2016 (during the term of the Turnbull government which succeeded the Abbott government).

===== Other climate change policy issues =====
In November 2013, the Abbott government made a decision not to send a ministerial delegate to the 2013 Warsaw climate summit. Days later the Abbott government abandoned its longstanding policy to cut emissions by between 5% and 25% of 2000 levels by 2020, stating that the Coalition would only commit to a 5% emissions reduction target.

Hunt also stated that the government will abolish the Climate Change Authority and Clean Energy Finance Corporation. In October Abbott and Hunt disputed statements from Christiana Figueres, the head of the United Nations Framework Convention on Climate Change, that the 2013 New South Wales bushfires were probably linked to climate change and that the government's Direct Action policy would be harmful, with Abbott stating that Figueres was "talking through her hat". Tony Abbott announced plans to again study the supposed health impacts of wind farms, before the public release of a survey of scientific literature on the issue.

"I do take your point about the potential health impact of these things...when I've been up close to these windfarms not only are they visually awful but they make a lot of noise...What we did recently in the Senate was to reduce, Alan, capital R-E-D-U-C-E, the number of these things that we are going to get in the future...I frankly would have liked to have reduced the number a lot more but we got the best deal we could out of the Senate and if we hadn't had a deal, Alan, we would have been stuck with even more of these things...What we are managing to do through this admittedly imperfect deal with the Senate is to reduce the growth rate of this particular sector as much as the current Senate would allow us to do."

— Tony Abbott on the Alan Jones radio show, 10 June 2015.

The 2014 Budget proposed to scrap the Australian Renewable Energy Agency which the Coalition repeatedly promised to retain in the lead up to the 2013 Federal Election, dumped the election promise for Million Solar Roofs, cut $484 million from Landcare and the Caring for Our Country programs, provided $1.5 billion for the East-West Link freeway and axed the National Water Commission.

Legislation to implement the Emissions Reduction Fund came into effect on 13 December 2014

In 2015, the Abbott government:

- Attempted to bring climate contrarian Bjørn Lomborg to the University of Western Australia with a $4 million grant
- Moved to prevent the $10 billion Clean Energy Finance Corporation from backing wind energy and household solar projects.
- Cut the Howard government's Renewable Energy Target and included a provision to include native wood waste as a renewable fuel source

Documents obtained with a Freedom of Information request show that the Department of Prime Minister and Cabinet proposed an investigation into the Bureau of Meteorology to address claims in The Australian that the BoM was exaggerating global warming. Environment Minister Greg Hunt argued against the investigation, instead setting up a review forum which found that the Bureau of Meteorology data were accurate.

==== Other environmental issues ====
In December 2013 Environment Minister Greg Hunt controversially approved the dumping of three million cubic metres of dredge spoil in the Great Barrier Marine Park. In the same month the Abbott government defunded Environment Defenders Offices across Australia. In January 2014, Environment Minister Greg Hunt cleared the way for a controversial shark cull in Western Australia by exempting it from federal legislation designed to protect threatened species,

Following on from its decision to fund the Environment Defenders Office, in June 2014 the federal Liberal Party unanimously endorsed a proposal to strip charity status from environmental groups including the Wilderness Society, the Australian Conservation Foundation and the Bob Brown Foundation. The same month the Abbott government lost a bid to have part of Tasmania's World Heritage forest de-listed from UNESCO's World Heritage programme, after declaring Australia had too much 'locked up' forest and that loggers were the 'ultimate conservationists'.

"We have quite enough national parks. We have quite enough locked up forests already. In fact, in an important respect, we have too much locked up forest.

— Tony Abbott at timber industry dinner on 4 March 2014.

=== Biosecurity ===
The Biosecurity Bill 2014 passed through parliament on 14 May 2015 with bipartisan support, as possibly "one of the most substantial and significant pieces of legislation to pass through Parliament during the term of the [Abbott] Government", seven years from its instigation following the 2008 Beale Review. It had been introduced by Labor's Gillard government in 2012. The Biosecurity Act 2015 was a major reform of the Quarantine Act, in particular in its strengthening and modernising the existing framework of regulations governing biosecurity in Australia.

=== Health ===
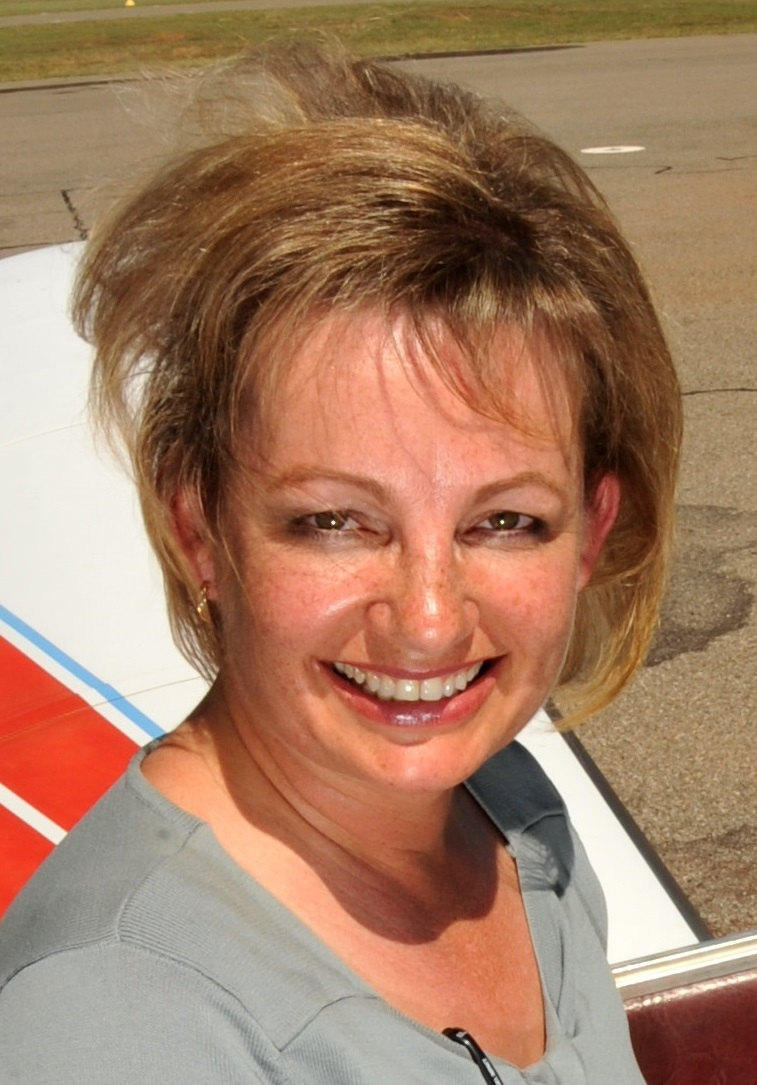
Sussan Ley took over as Minister for Health from Peter Dutton in December 2014

Following the election of the Abbott government, Peter Dutton became Minister for Health and Sport, the latter portfolio being elevated to Cabinet for the first time. In December 2014, Sussan Ley took over as Minister for Health and Sport. The Abbott government was elected in the early stages of implementation of the National Disability Insurance Scheme, which had been introduced by Julia Gillard, and for which the Coalition had offered bi-partisan support. The Government proposed the introduction of a $7 co-payment for GP visits to permanently augment funding of Medicare and establish a medical research fund to work towards curing cancer and dementia. The funding proposal failed to pass the Senate, but the Medical Research Future Fund was established in 2015.

In its first term, the Abbott government ceased a $5 million annual grant to the Australian Red Cross established under the Howard government.

When Scott Morrison became Social Services Minister, he proposed a crackdown on Disability Support Pensions to fund the National Disability Insurance Scheme.

61 Medicare Locals were replaced with 31 Primary Health Networks.

The 2014 Budget reduced the Commonwealth's share of hospital funding by A$15 billion by 2024, with the majority of the cuts beginning in 2017, despite a pre-election commitment of no cuts to health.

The Government raised $5.68 billion selling shares of Medibank Private.

==== Co-payment and Medical Research Future Fund ====
In his 2014 Budget Speech, Joe Hockey announced a commitment to build the $20 billion Medical Research Future Fund, in addition to existing funding through the National Health and Medical Research Council. Hockey predicted that the fund would, "within six years, be the biggest medical research endowment fund in the world" and announced that "all the savings from the introduction of a $7 Medicare co-contribution, modest changes to the Pharmaceutical Benefits Scheme and other responsible changes in this Health Budget" would be directed to the fund until it reaches $20 billion.

The $7 co-payment was to be for general practitioner (GP) visits and clinical pathology. Proceeds from the co-payment were to go towards a medical research fund. Since the announcement there has been a collapse in private medical research donations for medical research. It later emerged that the government had failed to model the impacts of the new GP fee including the impacts on hospital emergency room waiting times and medical research.

The Senate blocked passage of the medical co-payment, but approved the establishment of the Medical Research Future Fund in August 2015, with funding to be found through reduced health spending and the Health and Hospitals Fund, until a balance of $20bn is reached in 2020. The Fund is managed by the Future Fund, with interest generated going to medical research, beginning with $10 million in 2015, growing to $390m over the following three years.

==== Vaccination campaign ====
In April 2015, the Government announced the "no-jab, no pay" welfare reform to improve vaccination rates among minors for preventable diseases. The Abbott government initiative, which denies childcare rebate and family tax benefit A to parents who refuse to vaccinate their children resulted in "conscientious objector" numbers falling from 39,523 in December 2014 to 30,092 in December 2015, ahead of the commencement of the law.

=== Education ===
Christopher Pyne was appointed as Minister for Education. He assumed the education portfolio during the early stages of implementation of the school funding reforms inspired by the Gonski review, and introduced by the Gillard-Rudd governments, for which the Abbott led Opposition had pledged to match the Labor government's proposed funding for the next four years in August 2013 after initially opposing the measures. On 24 November 2013 Pyne announced that the Government was reviewing all aspects of the Gonski funding agreements on the grounds that they were "a shambles and quite unimplementable", and inferior to the model in place under the Howard government. Following protests from the state governments that had signed funding agreements, Abbott announced on 2 December that the government would still provide the funding that the Labor government had committed to over a four-year period, but the states would no longer be required to raise their funding or make other reforms, on the grounds that the government did not want to "try to run public schools out of Canberra".

In the 2014 budget, the Abbott government set aside $245 million for religious chaplains in schools. Secular schools were stripped of the option of hiring a secular equivalent, as they had been allowed to do under previous funding arrangements. Furthermore, taxpayers would subsidise the training of priests and other religious workers at private colleges for the first time under the Abbott government's proposed higher education reforms. In 2014 it was announced that religious teaching, training and vocational institutes would be eligible for a share of $820 million in new Commonwealth funding over three years.

==== New Colombo Plan ====
The New Colombo Plan was launched as a signature initiative of the Abbott government's foreign policy, and was aimed at enhancing the knowledge of the Indo-Pacific in Australia, by supporting Australian undergraduates studying and undertaking internships in the region. In 2014, the pilot scheme supported 40 scholars and more than 1300 mobility students to study and undertake work placements. In 2015 the Scheme expanded further across the Indo-Pacific, awarding 69 scholarships and supporting more than 3,100 mobility students. The scheme was continued by the Turnbull government.

==== University and TAFE deregulation ====
The Abbott government proposed in the 2014 budget the deregulation of universities and TAFEs. Furthermore, the amount of public funding for university courses will be reduced by 20% and expose students to big increases in their student debts with the removal of all caps on the fees universities can charge. Student debts will be compounded at the 10-year bond rate with a cap at 6% (it has historically been typically above 6%) instead of the consumer price index. Total government higher education funding is projected to be $9.5 billion by 2017–18. While this is a nominal increase of $750 million compared with 2012–13, analysis by The Guardian Australia shows it represents a cut of about $1.5 billion in real terms when population growth and inflation are taken into account. The government then claimed that removing the upper limit on university fees will cause fees to decrease. This contradicts the designer of the HECS system, Bruce Chapman, who has warned student debts will triple.

=== Freedom of information ===
The government moved to abolish the role of Freedom of Information Commissioner, abolish the Office of the Australian Information Commissioner and charge $800 for reviews of "freedom of information" request denials.

== 2015 Abbott leadership loss ==
=== Leaks against Abbott ===
The Abbott government was afflicted by leaks publicising policy divisions over national security and social policy. In 2014, leaked discussions about the Malaysian Airlines flight MH17 disaster in Ukraine had claimed Abbott wanted to send 1000 Australian soldiers to secure the site, but cabinet colleagues, including Foreign Minister Bishop talked him out of it. In January, a leak claimed Abbott ignored the advice of Treasurer Hockey and Health Minister Dutton to cut the Medicare rebate by $20, and in February a leak from the expenditure review committee claimed Abbott and his chief of staff were at odds with Ministers over the "earn or learn" welfare reform.

=== First leadership challenge ===
In February 2015, Liberal MPs Don Randall and Luke Simpkins called a February 2015 spill motion to spill the leadership positions of the party, though with no contender. Abbott won the vote 61 to 39.

The ABC reported that in the lead up to the motion, the Abbott government had been facing "leaks and growing media criticism", when Abbott earned the "ire of his colleagues and the derision of many Australians by appointing Prince Philip, the Duke of Edinburgh, as a Knight of the Order of Australia", and that the defeat of the Liberal National Party government of Campbell Newman had also disheartened the Coalition. On 5 February, Fairfax had reported that leadership speculation was at "fever pitch" after backbench Senator Arthur Sinodinos questioned Abbott's judgement on Sky News and refused to confirm if the Prime Minister would still hold his job in a week's time. The following day, the ABC's 7.30 reported that "The tensions between the Prime Minister and the colleagues campaigning to oust him are heading to a showdown."

In the months after the failed spill motion, leaking and backgrounding against Abbott continued, but polling for the Coalition initially improved. Following the Second Hockey Budget in May 2015, Newspoll placed Abbott's approval rating at an eight-month high, and in front of Bill Shorten as better prime minister for the first time in six months.

=== Further leaks ===
National security leaks

In February 2015, Abbott was hit by leaks criticising his interventions to attempt to save Myuran Sukumaran and Andrew Chan from the death penalty in Indonesia, and claiming that he had come up with a plan to "unilaterally invade Iraq" with a force of more than 3000 Australian troops to take on Islamic State forces. Abbott and Civil and military chiefs said the report was wrong. Fairfax reported that the leak "confirmed there are still people very close to Mr Abbott willing to leak information against him following this month's defeated leadership spill."

In May 2015, Fairfax correspondent Peter Hartcher published lengthy transcripts breaching Cabinet confidentiality purporting to recount Cabinet discussions on cancelling citizenship for dual nationals suspected of supporting terrorism. Hartcher wrote: "As a member of the Abbott cabinet, Malcolm Turnbull is obliged to keep any criticisms of the government's performance to himself. Unless, of course, it's in the confidentiality of the cabinet room itself", before quoting Turnbull and other Ministers at length in their criticisms of a national security policy proposal.

Cabinet cohesion

Following the citizenship leak, a leak emerged that Abbott had warned his cabinet against leaks. Julie Bishop and Malcolm Turnbull denied being the source of the leaks, and Joe Hockey was not in the room. Later, an internal four-page briefing document from the Prime Minister's office was leaked, revealing a strategy to attack the opposition as indecisive over anti-terror legislation. Bret Walker suggested the proposed changes would be unconstitutional.

In August, "talking points" briefing papers from the PMO advising Ministers to tell the media that "our cabinet is functioning exceptionally well," were leaked to Fairfax. The Herald reported: "Thursday's breach of confidentiality is the latest in a rolling series of leaks that have hit the government this week, including Monday night's threadbare cabinet agenda to the Seven Network and the Guardian Australia, details of Tuesday's party room meeting and Wednesday's morning note"

=== Second leadership challenge ===
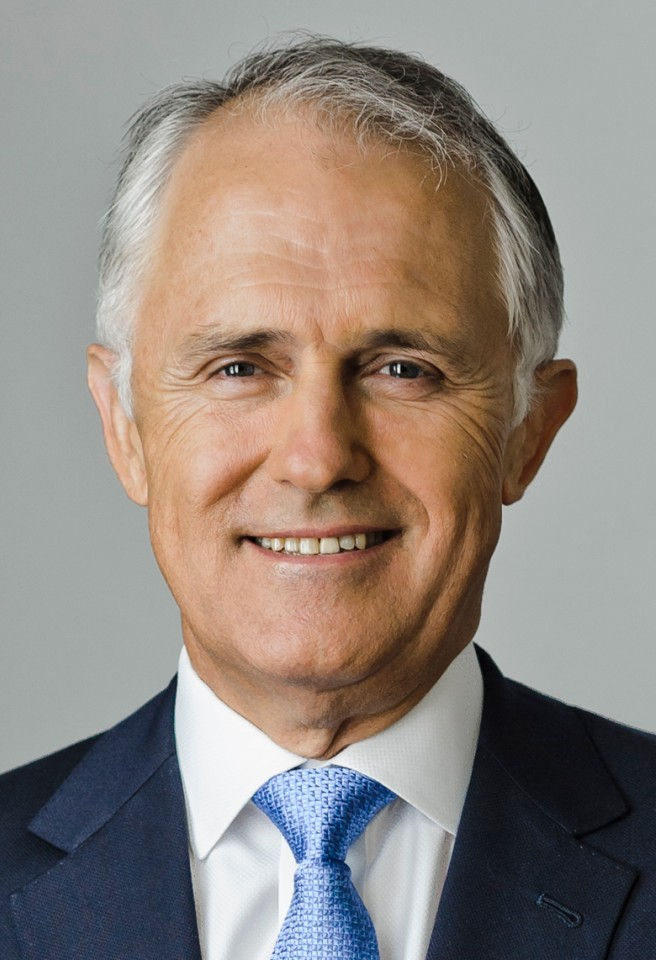
Successful Liberal leadership challenger Malcolm Turnbull defeated the incumbent with 54 votes to 44.

On 14 September 2015, Turnbull announced that he would be challenging Abbott. Turnbull cited Newspoll results and a need for a new style of "economic leadership" as reasons for mounting his challenge: "We have lost 30 Newspolls in a row. It is clear that the people have made up their mind about Mr Abbott's leadership," he said. In response, Abbott said that he was "dismayed by the destabilisation that's been taking place now for many, many months" and that Australia needed "strong and stable Government and that means avoiding, at all costs, Labor's revolving-door prime ministership." A September 2015 leadership spill was called, with Turnbull challenging Abbott, and winning by 54 votes to 44, and Abbott supporter Kevin Andrews challenging Julie Bishop and losing 70–30.

Approval ratings of Tony Abbott as Prime Minister View source data.

== Aftermath ==
Turnbull dropped Abbott, Joe Hockey, Eric Abetz, Ian Macfarlane, Kevin Andrews, Michael Ronaldson and Bruce Billson from his ministry, but increased the number of cabinet ministers from 19 to 21. Abbott returned to the backbench, while Julie Bishop remained Deputy Liberal leader and Foreign Minister in the Turnbull government. Scott Morrison became Turnbull's Treasurer, and Immigration Minister Dutton, an Abbott supporter, retained his post.

Polling was initially favourable to Turnbull following the leadership change, but the Coalition faced internal tensions as a result of the change. In a final address to the media as Prime Minister, Abbott expressed pride in the record of his government, but warned against a "poll-driven" political culture and unnamed media figures and politicians who would "connive at dishonour" by spreading anonymous, self-serving claims: "A febrile media culture has developed that rewards treachery" he said. In early December 2015, Abbott said he would not make a decision on his political future until April 2016.

Immigration Minister Dutton was excluded from the National Security Committee of Cabinet, reportedly over tensions between himself and Turnbull. In November, Fairfax reported: "Simmering tensions over the September leadership coup have flared up amid revelations Julie Bishop's chief of staff attended the meeting of Liberal MPs plotting against Tony Abbott on the night before the spill" as Abetz and Dutton called on Bishop to explain.

Former ministers Abetz and Andrews expressed some discontent at government direction, while Bruce Billson announced his retirement and Ian McFarlane – with the support of Deputy Prime Minister Warren Truss – attempted to switch to the National Party, but the move was blocked by the Liberals. Hockey's seat of North Sydney went to a by-election, which saw a 12.84% swing against the Liberal Party.

From the back bench, Abbott continued his commentary on the record of his government and on world affairs, particularly in relation to national security and the challenge posed by Islamist terrorism. Media critics accused Abbott of "sniping". Amid the deteriorating Syrian Civil War and following Germany's decision to open its borders to large numbers of asylum seekers, Abbott delivered the Margaret Thatcher Lecture in London on 28 October, and urged Europe to look to the Australian example of border management, and for the international community to do more to resolve the Syrian conflict. Turnbull did not endorse Abbott's view. Following the subsequent November 2015 Paris attacks by IS sympathisers, Turnbull said a political solution, not a military invasion was needed for Syria.

== See also ==
- Abbott ministry
- Turnbull government
- Telecommunications (Interception and Access) Amendment (Data Retention) Act 2015
