= March in March =

Marches in Australia

March in March protests
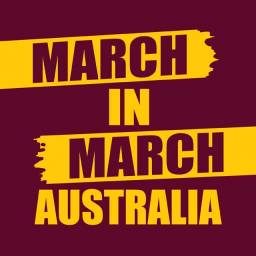
- March in March Australia designed by Shaun Minahan
- Date: 15 March 2014 – 17 March 2014
- Location: All Australian capital cities and many regional centres
- Caused by: Policies of the Abbott government; Lack of government transparency
- Goals: Delivery of a message of no confidence in the Australian government
- Methods: Demonstrations; Internet activism
- Status: Ongoing online activism.

Number
80,000	112,000

March in March refers to a series of marches which were held around Australia on 15–16 March 2014, and in Canberra, the national capital, on 17 March 2014, a parliamentary sitting day. The marches were attended by at least eighty thousand people across Australia and were peaceful (The Sydney Morning Herald reported 112,000). Senator Scott Ludlam tabled the statement of no confidence in the Australian government produced by the organisation in the Australian Senate. Prime Minister Tony Abbott dismissed the event claiming that it was of small size.

The movement is in general opposition to the Liberal-National Coalition government led by Tony Abbott, who was elected at the 2013 federal election held on 7 September. It has mostly been organised on social media.

The March in March movement has since grown to address a wider range of issues including industrial relations, environmental issues, asylum seeker policy and opposition to privatisation of public assets.

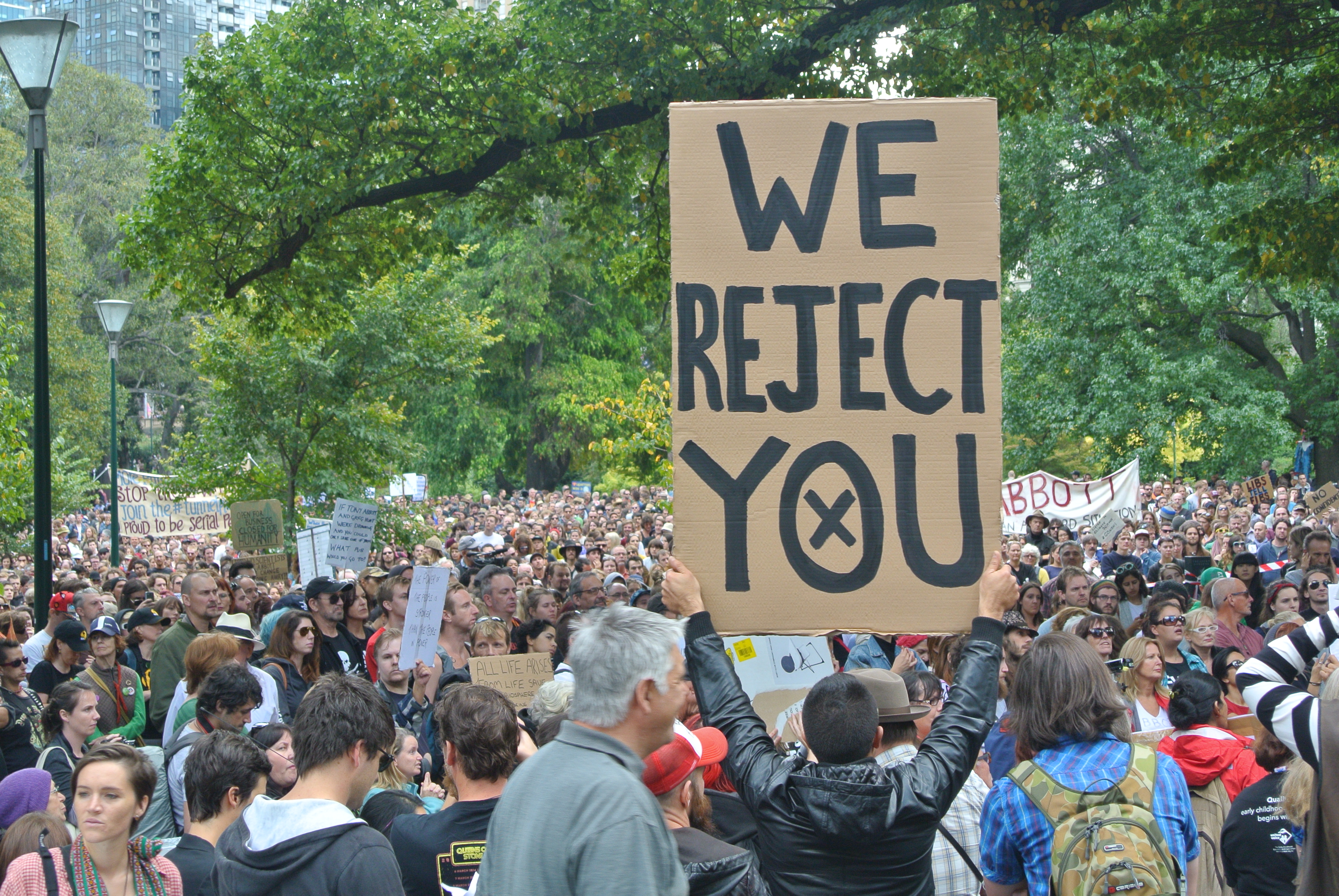
March in March in Melbourne

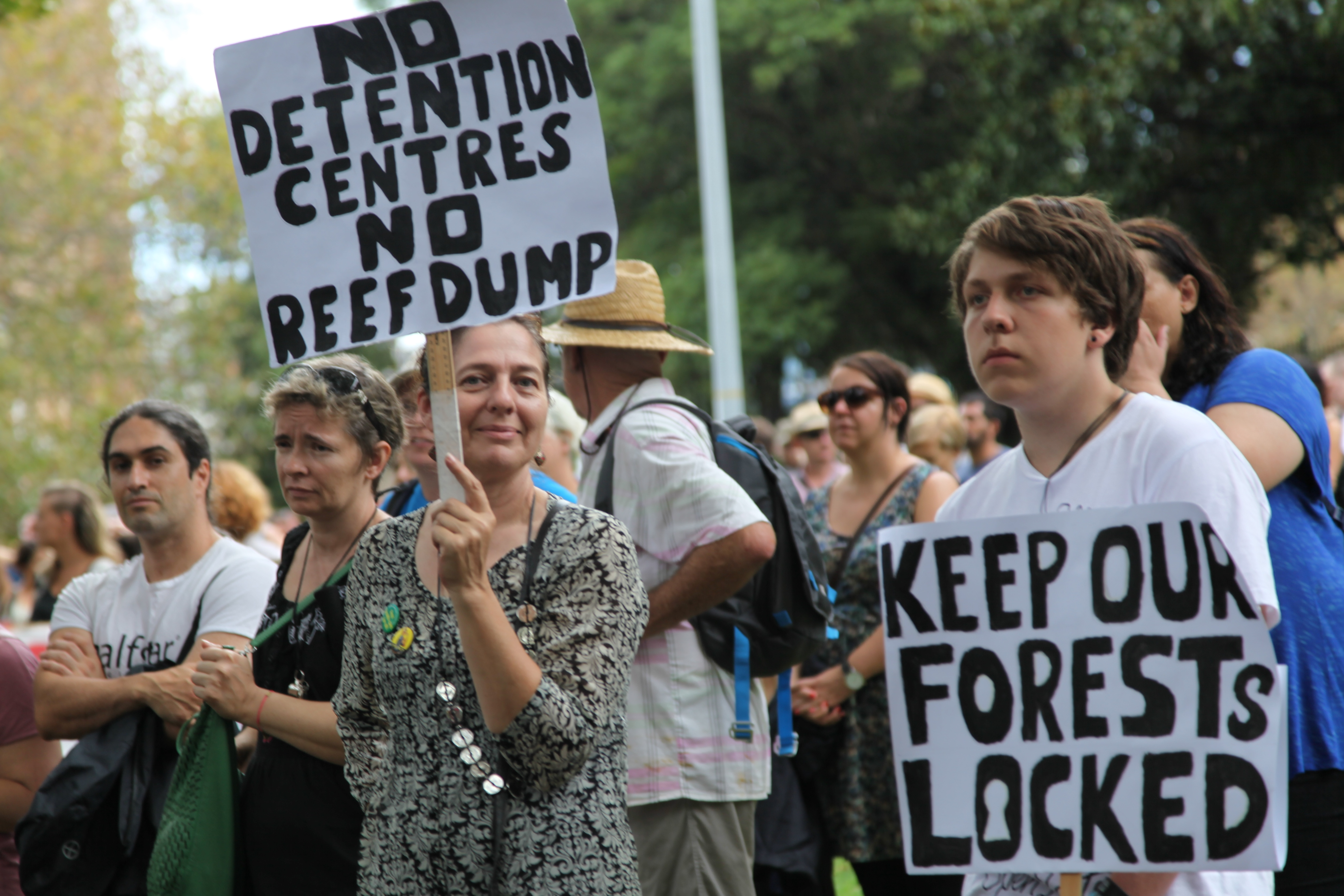
March in March in Sydney

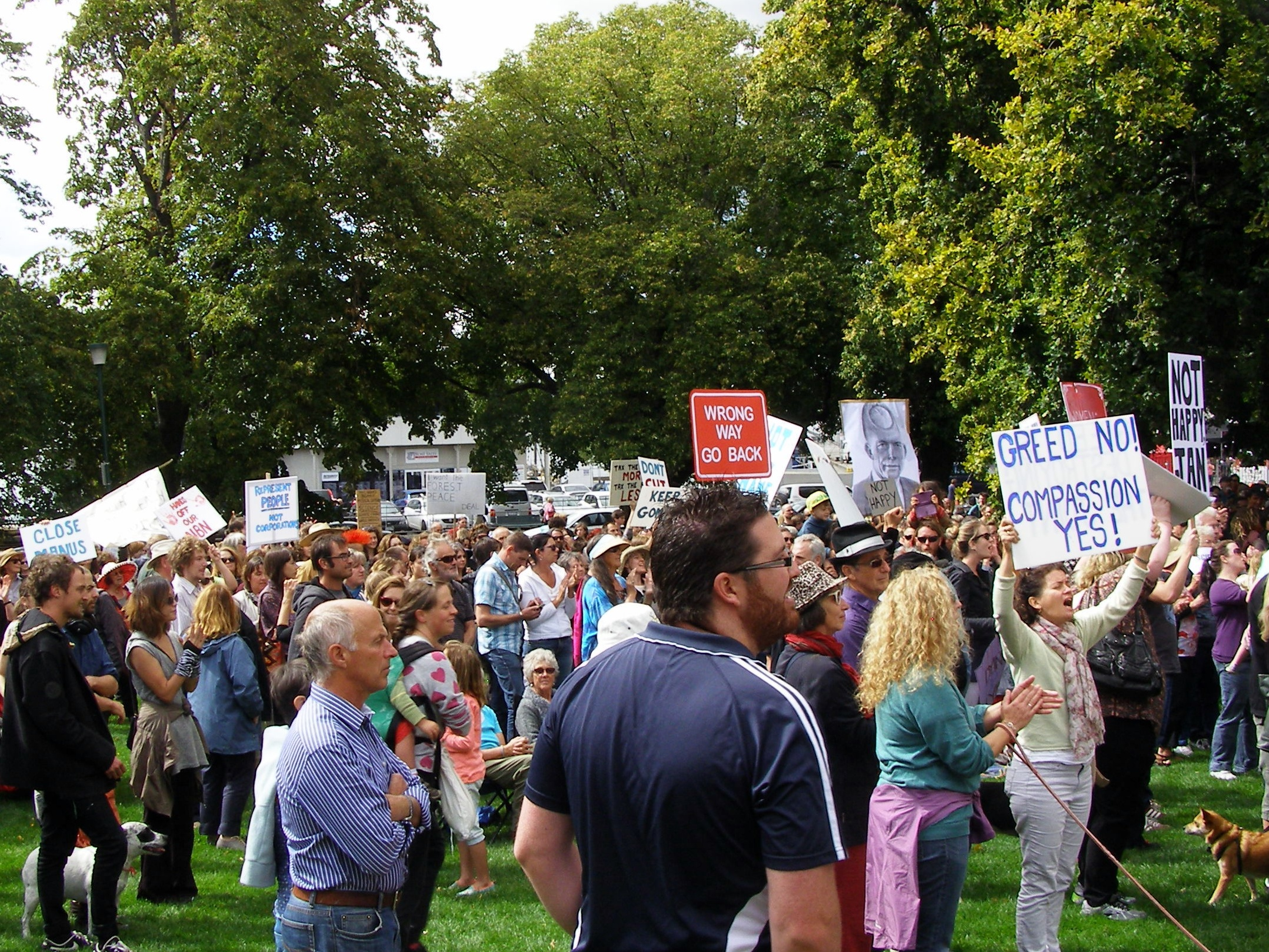
March in March in Hobart
