= Morrison government =

Australian government (2018–2022)

Morrison government

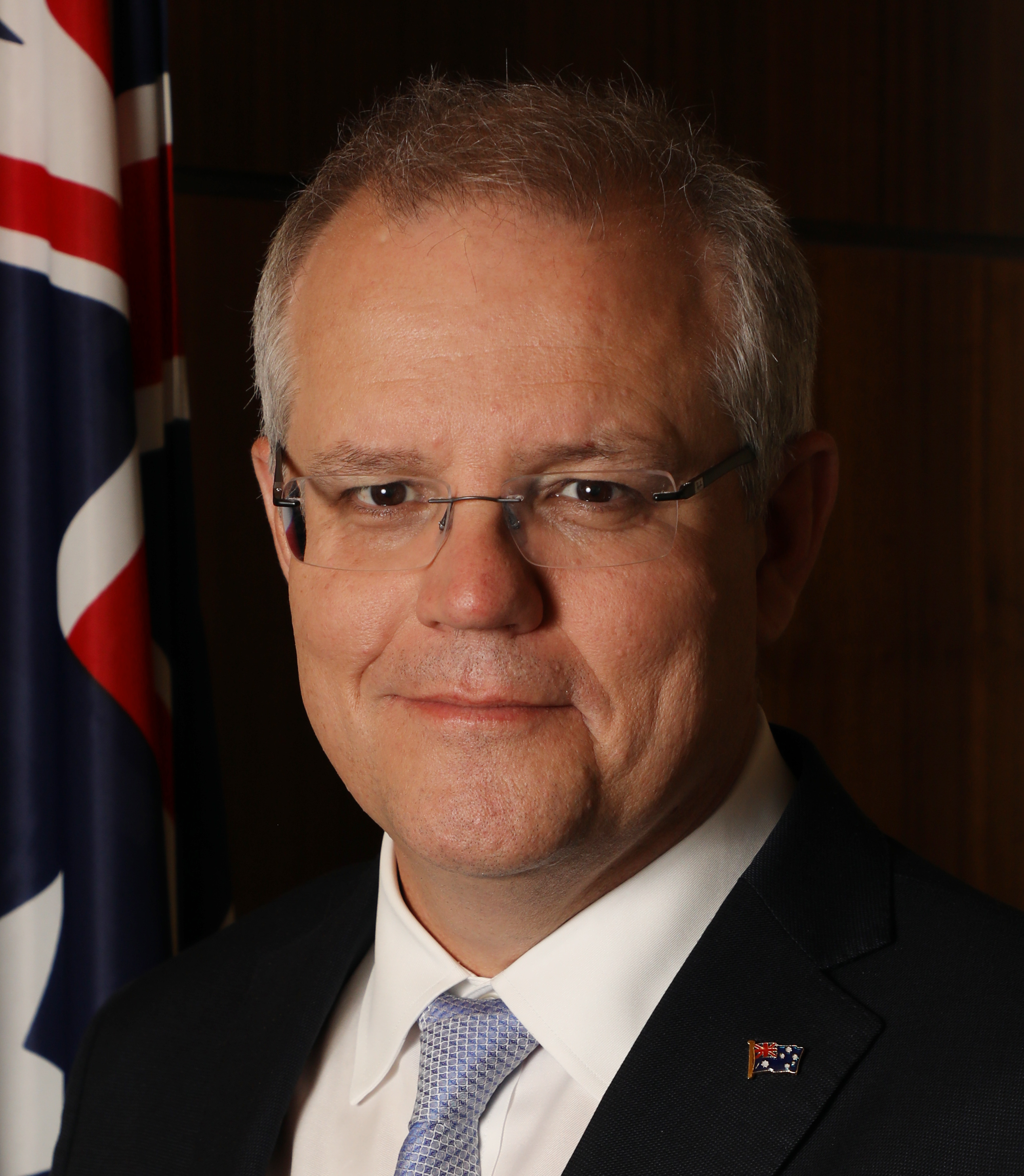

In office
- 24 August 2018 – 23 May 2022
- Monarch: Elizabeth II
- Governor-General: Sir Peter Cosgrove (24 August 2018 – 1 July 2019); David Hurley (1 July 2019 – 1 July 2024)
- Prime Minister: Scott Morrison
- Deputy: Barnaby Joyce
- Party: Liberal and National (Coalition)
- Status: Minority (October 2018 – May 2019; February 2021 – May 2022); Majority (August 2018 – October 2018; May 2019 – February 2021) (Note: After Turnbull lost the Liberal leadership, National MP Kevin Hogan left the government benches, but guaranteed confidence and supply and remained in the National party room. However, Turnbull's former seat of Wentworth was lost in a by-election to Kerryn Phelps resulting in a minority government. The government previously held 74 out of 149 seats in the House of Representatives. In February 2021, after the resignation of Craig Kelly from the Liberal Party, the Coalition effectively held 75 out of 151 seats plus a Liberal Speaker, however, the Speaker's vote is not considered to be part of the governments as he is expected the vote in accordance with convention only in which he must not create a majority where there is none, therefore the government did not hold a majority in the Lower House in its own right.)
- Origin: Morrison wins second 2018 Liberal leadership spill
- Demise: Coalition loses 2022 Australian federal election
- Predecessor: Turnbull government
- Successor: Albanese Government

The Morrison government was the federal executive government of Australia, led by Prime Minister Scott Morrison of the Liberal Party of Australia, between 2018 and 2022. The Morrison government commenced on 24 August 2018, when it was sworn in by the Governor-General of Australia. It was composed of members of the Liberal–National Coalition and succeeded the Abbott (2013–2015) and Turnbull (2015–2018) coalition governments in office, competing against the Australian Labor Party as the major Opposition party. Nationals Leader Michael McCormack was Deputy Prime Minister of Australia from the formation of the Morrison government until June 2021. He was replaced as Leader of the Nationals and Deputy Prime Minister by Barnaby Joyce.

Scott Morrison was Treasurer in the Turnbull government and became Prime Minister following the resignation of Malcolm Turnbull in 2018. The Coalition had been led to government at the 2013 Election by Tony Abbott, however Malcolm Turnbull became Prime Minister by challenging Abbott in 2015. Turnbull then led the Coalition to a narrow victory at the 2016 Election, and resigned in the midst of a challenge to his leadership by Minister for Home Affairs Peter Dutton in 2018. Turnbull then quit Parliament, plunging the Coalition into minority government following the 2018 Wentworth by-election. Elected leader of the Liberals over Dutton in the 2018 spill, Morrison then restored the Coalition to majority government at the 2019 Election.

With the commencement of the Morrison government, Josh Frydenberg replaced Julie Bishop as the Deputy Leader of the Liberal Party and replaced Morrison as Treasurer in the First Morrison Ministry, while Marise Payne took over from Bishop as Foreign Minister. Frydenberg and Payne remained in their posts in the Second Morrison Ministry, which was notable for including Ken Wyatt as Minister for Indigenous Australians – the first Aboriginal Australian to sit in Federal Cabinet – and seven women members, which was the largest number of women Cabinet members in Australian history.

In economic affairs, after producing the lowest federal budget deficit in a decade, Treasurer Frydenberg predicted a small surplus in the 2019 Federal Budget, however the outbreak of the COVID-19 pandemic led to a dramatic increase in government expenditure and a brief recession by September 2020. Pandemic management became a core focus of the Morrison government, which instigated tight border controls, convened a National Cabinet to co-ordinate State and Territory government responses, and initiated a program of income support for business and workers. Two years into the pandemic, Australia had achieved one of the lowest death rates and highest vaccination rates in the world. In February 2022, the Morrison government announced a re-opening of borders to international tourist travel. By the fourth Frydenberg Budget in March 2022 ahead of the 2022 Election, Australia’s unemployment rate was at 4% and projected to drop to 3.75%, its lowest figure in 50 years.

In trade and international affairs, the Morrison government concluded free trade agreements with Indonesia, the United Kingdom and India. In the Indo-Pacific region, Morrison launched the Pacific Step-Up initiative to increase engagement with Pacific Island nations, and revived the Quadrilateral Security Dialogue with Japan, India and United States. He also signed the AUKUS trilateral security pact with the United Kingdom and the United States to increase defence co-operation. The period was marked by a deterioration in bilateral relations with the increasingly autocratic Xi Jinping government in China, with Australia calling for an independent inquiry into the origins of COVID-19 and China responding with trade sanctions. Following the Russian invasion of Ukraine in 2022, Morrison committed Australian military, diplomatic and humanitarian aid to support Ukraine's efforts to repel the Russian attack.

Morrison called the 2022 federal election on 10 April 2022, to be held on 21 May. After the majority of votes had been counted on election night, it became clear that the Coalition had no path to forming government. Morrison conceded the election, also announcing he would step down as leader of the Liberal Party. Labor leader Anthony Albanese was sworn in as the 31st Prime Minister of Australia on 23 May 2022.

== Background ==
=== Abbott wins office for Coalition ===
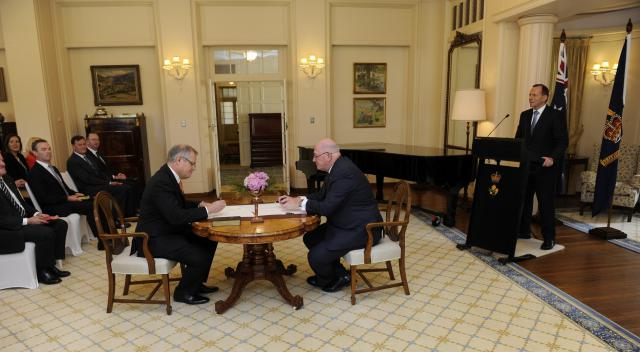
Morrison is sworn in as Minister for Social Services in the Abbott government by Governor-General Sir Peter Cosgrove in 2014

The Liberal-National Coalition won office under the leadership of Tony Abbott in the 2013 Australian federal election in which Abbott defeated the second Rudd government and ended six years of Labor government. Abbott had sought election on a platform promising to: restore stability after Labor infighting; reduce wasteful spending and restore Budget surpluses; abolish the Labor government's carbon and mining taxes; halt the seaborne people smuggling of asylum seekers; build infrastructure; prioritise indigenous affairs; and run a foreign policy that was "less Geneva, more Jakarta.". "

In office, the Abbott government removed the Rudd-Gillard era Resource Super Profits Tax and carbon tax. With Scott Morrison as Minister Immigration and Border Protection, the government halted the people smuggling trade; concluded free trade agreements with China, Japan and South Korea; established the National Commission of Audit to advise on restoring the Budget to surplus; instituted the Royal Commission into Trade Union Governance and Corruption; founded the Medical Research Future Fund; produced White Papers on Developing Northern Australia and the Agricultural Competitiveness; and promised a referendum to recognise indigenous Australians in the Constitution. Treasurer Joe Hockey delivered two Budgets, the first focused on expenditure reduction measures, but faced a hostile reception in the Senate and media. Partial deregulation of universities, and a $7 contribution to doctor visits were proposed, but blocked by the Senate. The second Budget emphasised stimulus for the small business sector.

Internal dissatisfaction with Abbott's style and policy agenda emerged within a section of the Liberal Party room and coalesced around old rival Malcolm Turnbull, whom Abbott had replaced as Opposition Leader in 2009. In February 2015, the ABC reported that "tensions between the Prime Minister and the colleagues campaigning to oust him are heading to a showdown." A spill called by two WA backbenchers failed to raise the numbers for a change in leadership, however leaking and backgrounding against Abbott continued, though polling for the Coalition began to improve.

=== Turnbull challenges Abbott ===
In September 2015, Malcolm Turnbull ended speculation by launching a challenge against Abbott. Turnbull cited Newspoll results and "economic leadership" as reasons for mounting his challenge. on 14 September 2015, Malcolm Turnbull won a leadership ballot, 54 votes to 44, and the Turnbull government became the federal government of Australia. Turnbull appointed Scott Morrison as his Treasurer in an expanded ministry. The Turnbull government continued a number of Abbott government initiatives, maintaining Abbott's promise for a plebiscite on same-sex marriage in Australia, and his carbon emissions targets. Unable to secure passage of Abbott's bill to re-establish an anti-corruption watchdog for the construction industry, Turnbull initiated a double dissolution election. The election was held on 2 July, Under the slogan "jobs and growth," Turnbull then led the Coalition to the 2016 Election in which their majority in the House of Representatives was reduced to one seat.

== Morrison becomes Prime Minister ==
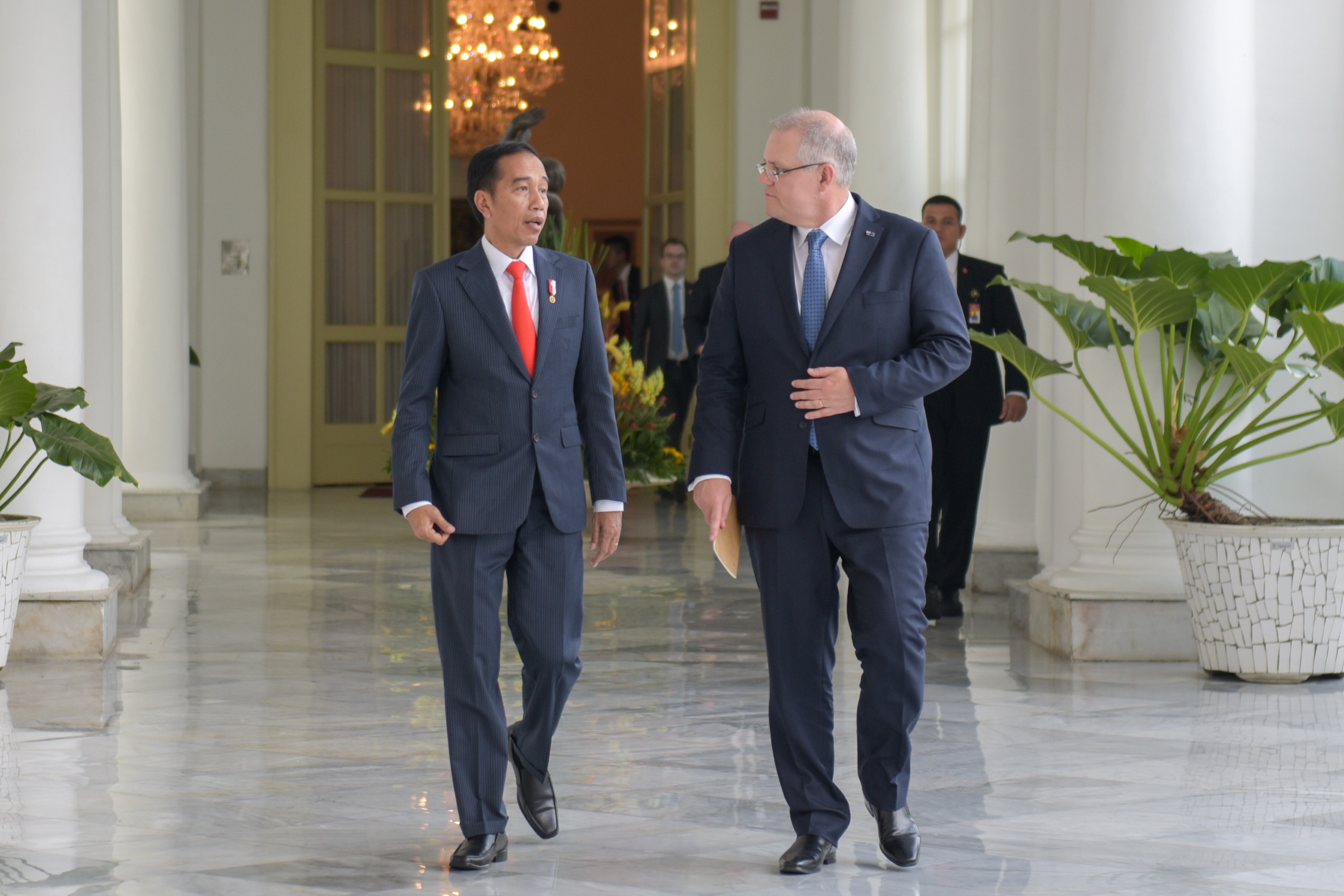
Morrison with President Joko Widodo of Indonesia on his first overseas visit as prime minister in October 2019.

Turnbull's ousting of Abbott had divided the Liberal Party rank and file and tensions continued in the parliamentary Party. In April 2018, the government reached the 30-consecutive-Newspoll-losses benchmark Turnbull had used to unseat Abbott. The government suffered by-election losses in July 2018. Dissent from conservative MPs over issues such as energy prices grew during Turnbull's final months. On 21 August, ahead of his 39th consecutive Newspoll loss, Turnbull announced a leadership spill, which he narrowly won against Peter Dutton. Turnbull resigned three days later after losing the confidence of his party room. Scott Morrison declared himself a candidate for leadership and won the resultant spill, defeating Dutton and Julie Bishop. He became Australia's 30th Prime Minister. After an eleven-year run as Deputy Leader of the Liberal Party, Julie Bishop garnered just 11 votes out of the 85-member party room, and quit her position as Foreign Minister to go to the backbench.

Dutton committed to serving in and supporting the Morrison government, while Turnbull and Bishop were disaffected by the results of the leadership challenge. A week after losing the leadership, Turnbull formally tendered his resignation from federal parliament. He became a trenchant critic of his successor Scott Morrison and backed independent candidates to replace Liberals in subsequent by-elections and elections. Bishop told a Women's Weekly awards event in the month after the spill that it had prompted discussion on the "bullying, intimidation, harassment and coercion" by federal politicians and "unfair unequal treatment of women". She joined Turnbull in calling for "clarity" around Dutton's eligibility to sit in Parliament, and refused to say how she would vote in the event of a referral. Bishop announced she would quit politics and not re-contest her seat in a statement to parliament in February 2019.

In December 2018, the Liberal Party room voted for a change in Party rules regarding leadership spills, and announced that a sitting prime minister who has won an election could no longer be removed by the Party room unless there was a two-thirds majority calling for the change. Opposition Leaders could still be challenged with a simple majority. Morrison said the move was in response to public disgust at the repeated rolling of Prime Ministers over the preceding decade.

=== Minority government ===
Turnbull's resignation necessitated the 2018 Wentworth by-election. The Turnbull government had won the 2016 federal election with a single seat majority in the House of Representatives (76 seats out of 150). Turnbull nevertheless refused to campaign for his successor Liberal candidate Dave Sharma. The by-election was held on 20 October 2018, and independent candidate Kerryn Phelps was elected, with a swing of almost twenty percent away from the Liberals. It was the first time since the inaugural 1901 election that the seat had not been represented by the Liberals, its predecessors, or party defectors. One of Phelps' campaign promises was to bring more humane treatment of asylum seekers held on Manus Island (in the Manus Regional Processing Centre) and Nauru (in the Nauru Regional Processing Centre), which was partly brought to fruition with the passing of the "Medevac bill" early in 2019.

Turnbull's quitting of Parliament also contributed to the defection of two of the Coalition's MPs to the crossbenches, which reduced the Coalition to a minority on the floor of Parliament. National Party MP Kevin Hogan had threatened to move to the crossbench if Turnbull was ousted as Prime Minister. On 27 August 2018, three days after Morrison succeeded Turnbull as leader, Hogan confirmed that he would sit on the crossbench, while remaining a member of the National Party and providing confidence and supply to the government.

The loss of Turnbull's seat together with the subsequent defection of the Liberal Member for Chisholm Julia Banks to the crossbench on 27 November, reduced the government's numbers to 73. Banks made the announcement while Morrison was announcing a timetable for Budget surplus in 2019. She told Parliament her former Party had "changed largely due to the actions of the reactionary and regressive right wing who talk about and to themselves rather than listening to the people." The Guardian reported that the move undercut Morrison's efforts to stabilise the government and project a plan for the next election. Banks promised confidence and supply to the government. She told Fairfax Media that she was prepared to refer Turnbull's challenger Peter Dutton to the High Court over his eligibility to sit in Parliament, a move that would further reduce the government's numbers on the floor of the House. Banks ran as an independent in the subsequent 2019 Election, but lost to the Liberal candidate. The seat of Wentworth also returned to the Liberals with the election of former diplomat Dave Sharma.

=== First Ministry ===
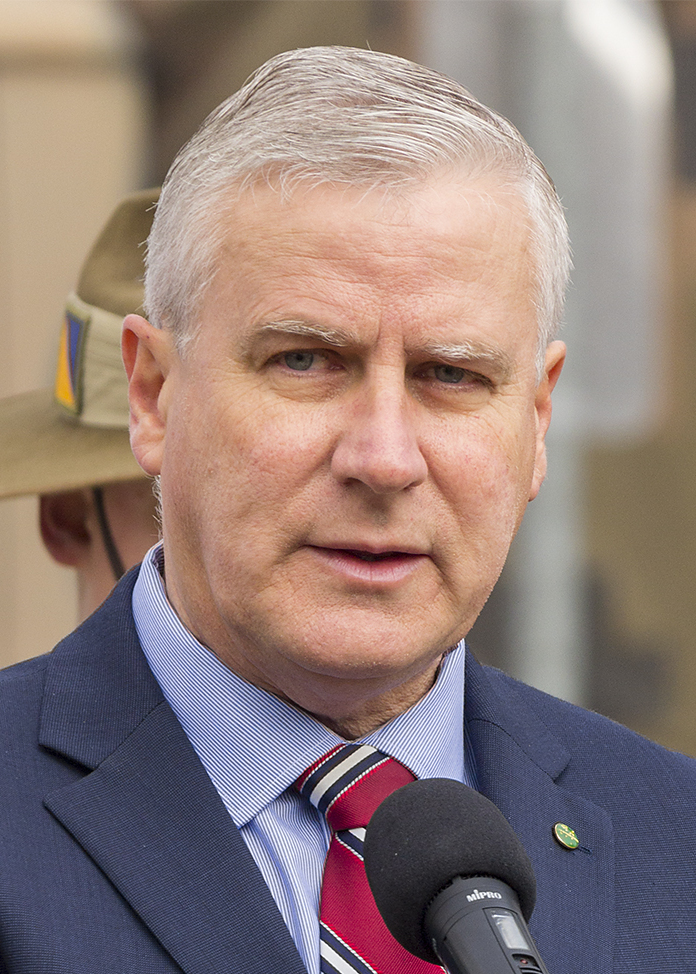
The Leader of the Nationals Michael McCormack was Deputy Prime Minister until June 2021

Morrison was sworn in as prime minister on 24 August 2018, by the Governor-General, Sir Peter Cosgrove, in a ceremony at Government House. The newly elected Deputy Leader of the Liberal Party Josh Frydenberg was the only other minister sworn in, as Treasurer. Morrison told the press that his government would return stability and unity to the country. National Party Leader Michael McCormack continued as Deputy Prime Minister. On 26 August, Morrison announced that Senator Marise Payne would succeed the resigning Julie Bishop as Foreign Minister. Peter Dutton retained his job as Home Affairs Minister, but had his responsibilities split to separate out the Immigration portfolio, with that job going to David Coleman. Turnbull supporter Christopher Pyne replaced Senator Payne as Defence Minister and Steve Ciobo was selected for the Defence Industry role. Simon Birmingham took over Mr Ciobo's former job as Trade Minister. Melissa Price was promoted into Cabinet and as Environment Minister. Angus Taylor was given the Energy portfolio. Dan Tehan became Education Minister. Deposed Nationals leader Barnaby Joyce, who had been previously ousted by Turnbull, was appointed as Special Envoy for Drought Assistance and Recovery. The Ministry was sworn in on 28 August 2018.

On 17 December 2018, Andrew Broad resigned over a sex scandal. On 19 January 2019, Kelly O'Dwyer, Minister for Women, Jobs and Industrial Relations, announced that she would not be contesting the upcoming election as her two children would be approaching primary school age and she wanted to give her and her husband the best opportunity for a third child. Within one week, Human Services Minister Michael Keenan and Indigenous Affairs Minister Nigel Scullion also announced that they would not recontest their seats at the 2019 election, widely attributed to the low chances of the Morrison government being re-elected.

== First term of government 2018–2019 ==
=== Economy ===
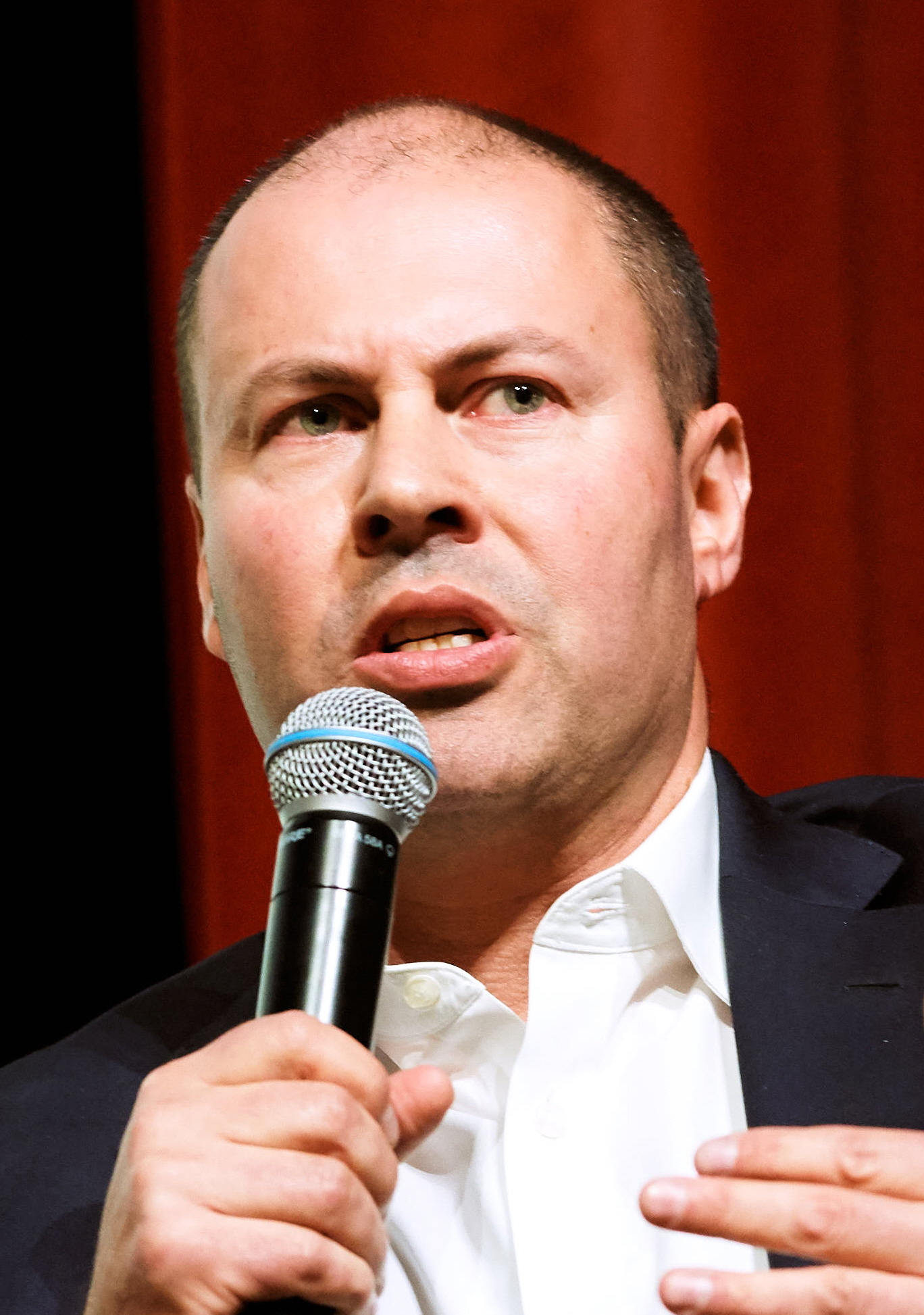
Treasurer Josh Frydenberg.

Morrison had been Treasurer in the Turnbull government, and was succeeded by Josh Frydenberg in the role. In September, Treasurer Frydenberg announced that the government would deliver a smaller budget deficit than forecast for 2017–18, and that the budget was on track to return to balance by 2019–20. The Final Budget Outcome deficit of $10.1 billion was $19.3bn smaller than predicted, and the smallest recorded since the 2008 financial crisis. The result had been assisted by larger tax intakes and less spending on social security than expected. The Treasurer credited the result to the Coalition's economic management with real spending growth down to its lowest level in half a century. In October 2018, The Economist described Australia as possessing "the world’s most successful economy".

The "tampon tax": the Goods and Services Tax applied to feminine hygiene products, will be removed as of 1 January 2019.

The Royal Commission into Misconduct in the Banking, Superannuation and Financial Services Industry was handed down in February, with 76 recommendations. There were only five remaining sitting days in Parliament, so there is little time for a legislative response before the election. Labor has indicated that it intends to work with the crossbench to extend the sitting days for Parliament, however, Christopher Pyne, speaking for the government, has pointed out that these laws are complex and should not be rushed through.

==== Federal Budget ====
Morrison said the government would "continue to consolidate the budget", but its priorities for spending included additional school and hospital funding, affordable medicines and the national disability insurance scheme. In November, Morrison and Frydenberg announced the 2019 Federal Budget would be brought forward a month to 2 April. "We will be handing down a budget and it will be a surplus budget. It will be a budget which is the product of the years of hard work of our government," Morrison said.

Treasurer Josh Frydenberg handed down the budget in a speech to parliament on the night of 2 April. The budget forecast a small surplus of $7.1 billion in the upcoming financial year (2019–20), though it was technically in deficit as the existing financial year came to a close. The leading statements made were a cash rebate targeted toward lower and middle-income earners, with the Coalition promising to double the low and middle income tax offset it offered workers in the previous year's budget, giving voters on incomes between $50,000 and $90,000 a rebate of $1,080, similar to the Labor Party's proposals. The budget was criticised by the opposition for proposing to flatten the tax rates of all income earners between $45,000-$200,000 to 30% in the long-term, though the Treasurer argued that doing so would provide an "incentive [for] people to stay in work, to work longer, to work more." The government also promised $100 billion infrastructure funding over the decade and offered one-off payments for nearly 4 million welfare recipients to cover the cost of energy prices, which Labor supported. Labor's budget reply differed from the government most notably with a $2.3 billion proposal to cover medical imaging, consultation and medicines' costs for cancer patients. Overall, Labor had approximately $200 billion more funding than the Coalition to utilise over the decade; as it proposed more revenue raising, including scaling back negative gearing and abolishing cash refunds for excess franking credits, policies which were vociferously opposed by the government.

=== Foreign affairs, defence and trade ===
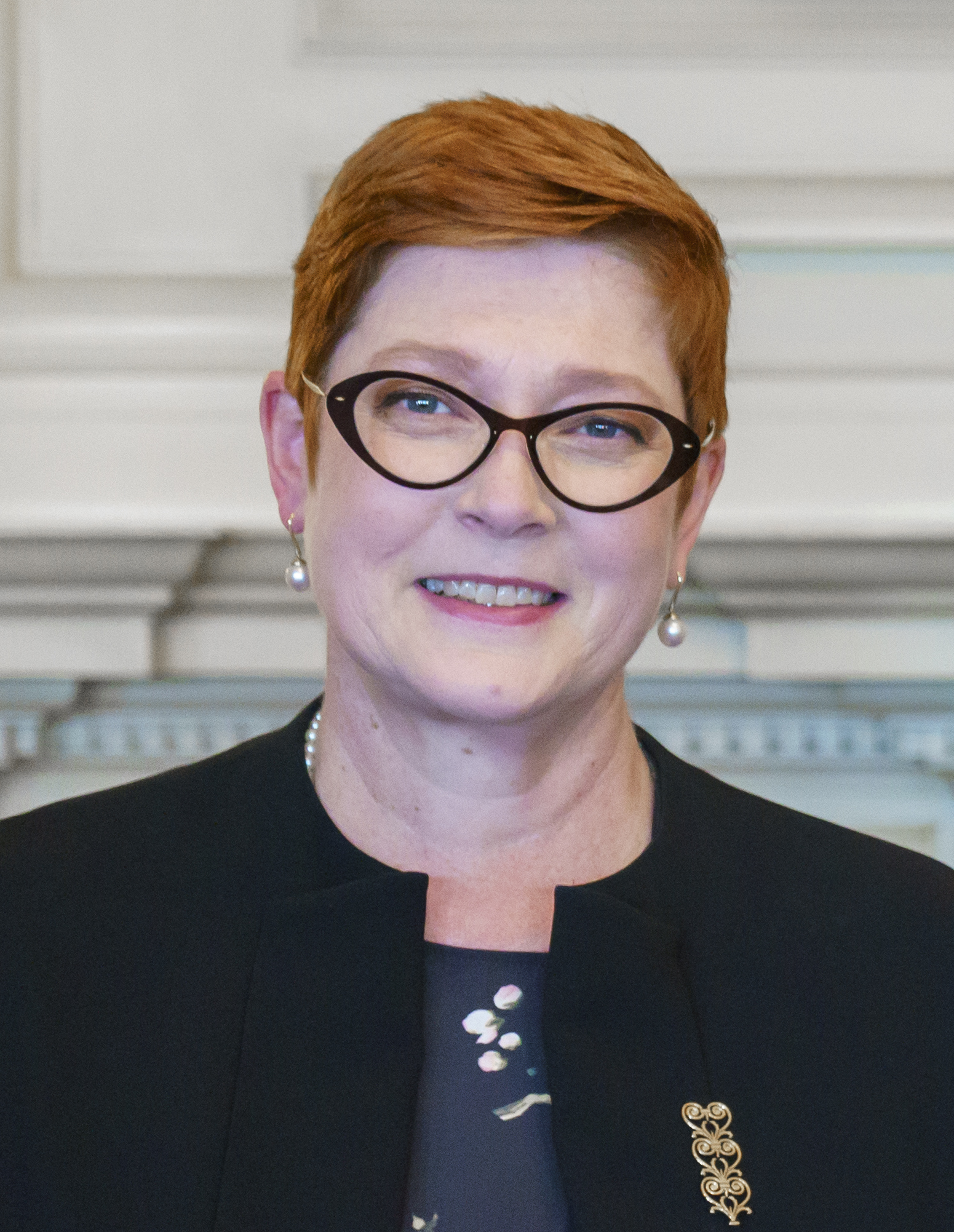
Foreign Minister Marise Payne.

Morrison shifted Marise Payne from the Defence Portfolio to the role of Minister for Foreign Affairs, following the resignation of Julie Bishop from the role. He visited Jakarta for the Australia–Indonesia Business Forum and met with President Joko Widodo on his first overseas visit as prime minister. The Morrison government and Indonesia announced the substantive conclusion of negotiations on the Indonesia -Australia Comprehensive Economic Partnership Agreement (IA-CEPA) on 31 August 2018.

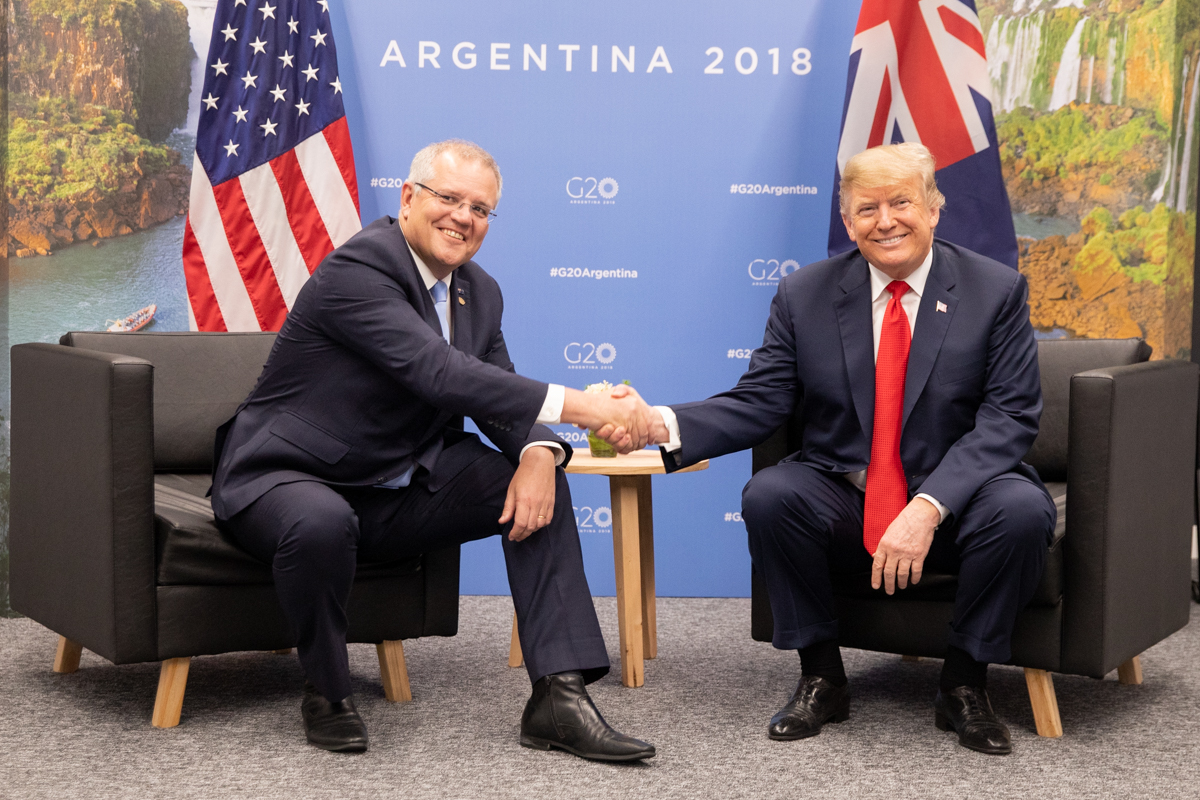
Morrison with U.S. President Donald Trump at the G20 Summit in Buenos Aires

Morrison has signalled that his government could accept New Zealand's offer to accept refugees detained by Australia on Manus and Nauru if they were subject to a lifetime ban from coming to Australia.

Due to the assassination of Jamal Khashoggi, the Australian government has pulled out of the Future Investment Initiative summit in Saudi Arabia.

==== Israeli embassy ====
During the Wentworth by-election campaign, and following the announcement by the United States that it would relocate its embassy in Israel from Tel Aviv to Jerusalem, Morrison announced he was reviewing whether Australia's embassy in Israel should move to Jerusalem. Indonesia responded by putting the free trade agreement on hold, though it was eventually signed in Jakarta in March 2019.

In December 2018, Morrison announced Australia has recognised West Jerusalem as the capital of Israel but will not immediately move its embassy from Tel Aviv.

==== Pacific Step-Up ====
Ahead of the 2018 APEC Forum in PNG, the Morrison government announced increased defence co-operation with Pacific nations including a plan to jointly develop a naval base on Manus Island with Papua New Guinea and a "pivot to the Pacific" involving the establishment of a $2 billion infrastructure bank for the Pacific to be known as the Australian Infrastructure Financing Facility, to issue grants and long-term loans for projects such as telecommunications, energy, transport and water development. Morrison also pledged to open diplomatic missions in Palau, the Marshall Islands, French Polynesia, Niue and the Cook Islands. The "pivot to the Pacific" has been read as a way of undermining Chinese influence in the region.

At the Pacific Islands Forum in August 2019 the 'Pivot to the Pacific' was severely undermined by Morrison's intransigence on the topic of climate change. In the face of an existential threat to those Morrison refers to as "family", Morrison refused to offer more than tokenism. The "very insulting and condescending" behaviour offered by Morrison comes as the Deputy PM tells an Australian business group that Pacific Islanders will survive "because many of their workers come here to pick our fruit".

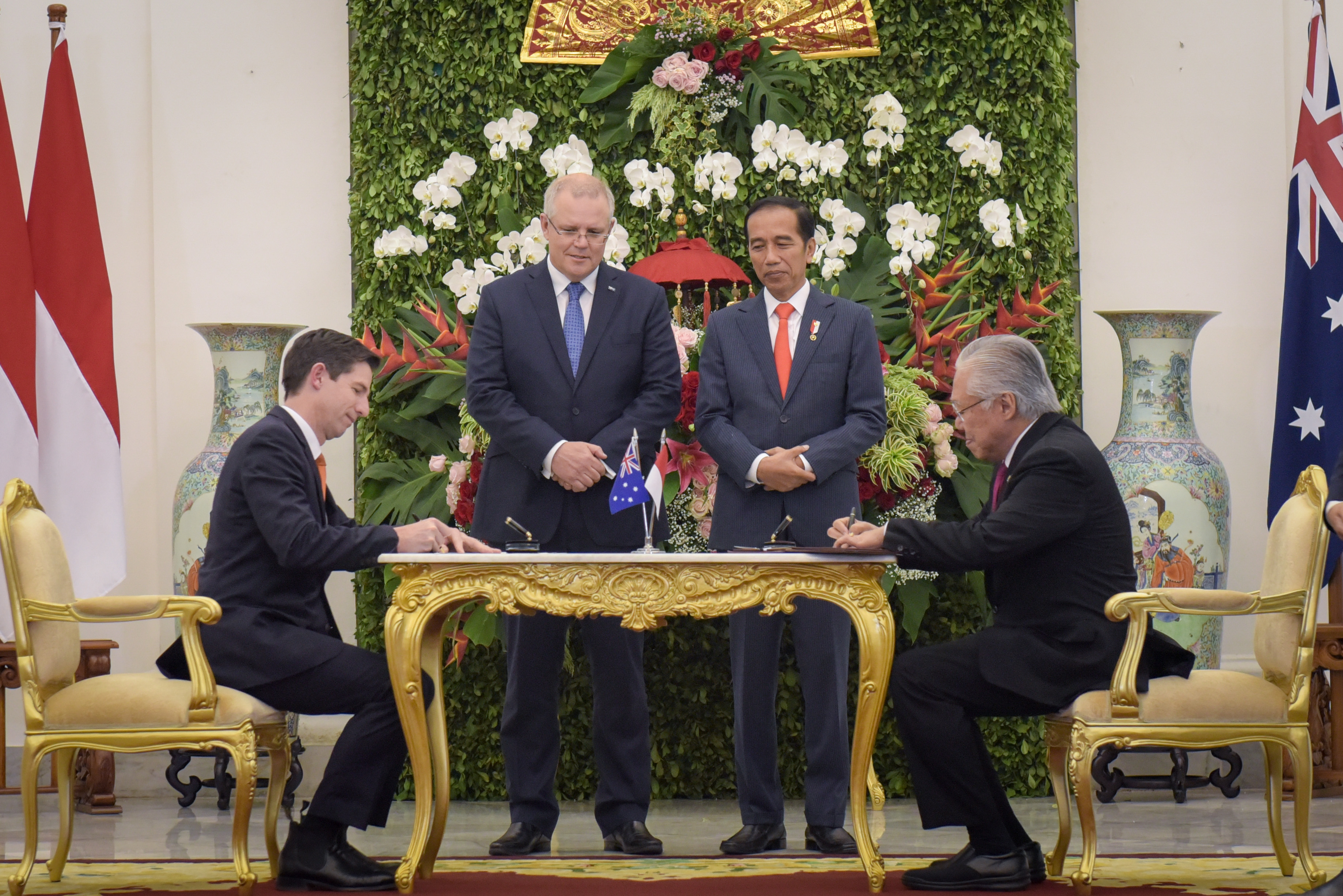
Trade ministers Simon Birmingham and Enggartiasto Lukita sign a memorandum of understanding in Jakarta in August 2018, as Prime Minister Scott Morrison and President Joko Widodo look on.

==== Indonesia Economic Partnership ====
The Indonesia–Australia Comprehensive Economic Partnership Agreement (IA-CEPA) was signed by the Trade Minister Simon Birmingham in March 2019. Australia ratified the agreement in November 2019 (alongside CEPAs with Peru, Hong Kong and China) and Indonesia followed suit in February 2020, with its provisions coming into effect in April 2020. The agreement secured greater access for Australian agriculture and education into the Indonesian market. In an historic address to the Australian Parliament following the ratification of the agreement, Indonesian President Joko Widodo welcomed the pact and said that Australia is Indonesia's closest friend, while calling on the two democracies to battle against identity politics, improve human rights, foster greater tolerance and stop terrorism. Morrison said in reply "We now have a plan of action to take the next steps in our relationship — from trade and investment to defence, counter-terrorism, maritime security, ocean sustainability and education, to name only some — and even today we add energy and the future of fuel sources for our nations to this long list."

=== Energy and climate change ===
After taking office, Morrison appointed Angus Taylor as Minister for Energy, saying "I am going to be the Prime Minister for getting electricity prices down. Angus Taylor is the minister for getting electricity prices down and that is a core focus of my government..."

Morrison committed to remaining in the Paris Agreement settled under the Abbott and Turnbull governments, but promised a greater focus on reduction of energy prices. He described coal as remaining "a key source of keeping electricity prices down and keeping the lights on, and I intend for it to stay there". The Morrison government did not commit to replacing the existing renewable energy target with anything when it expires in 2020, stating that it will not be needed to meet emissions reduction targets.

The government has implemented the Australian Competition & Consumer Commission's review recommendations into electricity prices by asking energy retailers to introduce a default market offer for households and small businesses, which would be standard across all retailers. This is designed to assist consumers who do not regularly change their power provider.

Australian school students were inspired by Greta Thunberg to strike for three days after 28 November, ignoring the call of their Prime minister Scott Morrison who said in the parliament that "what we want is more learning in schools and less activism".

According to the government's 2018 emissions projections report, Australia has already achieved its 2030 emissions reduction target of 26-28% less emissions than in 2005. The government expects Australia will exceed its 2030 target.

As of February, the Morrison government announced that it was taking its energy bill to the election, as it would likely be amended to prevent government funding of new coal-fired power stations.

Morrison has allocated $2bn over 10 years to the Abbott government-era Emissions Reduction Fund, renaming it the Climate Solutions Fund. A project that is expected to benefit from the Climate Solutions Fund is the Tasmanian Battery of the Nation hydro-electric project.

The government has endorsed the Snowy 2.0 hydro-electric project, a proposal of the Turnbull government.

=== Social security ===
Morrison changed the age at which Australians can receive the age pension back to 67, from an age of 70, which had been government policy since the 2014 Australian federal budget. In September 2018, the base Newstart rate was raised by $2.20 per week, but further increases to Newstart have been ruled out by Morrison, who has stated that it is a "very expensive undertaking". The Liberal and Labor parties voted for a bill which would enforce a wait of four years before new migrants could receive social security payments.

In response to the Royal Commission into Institutional Responses to Child Sexual Abuse, Morrison delivered on 22 October 2018 a National Apology Address in the Australian Parliament to victims of child sexual abuse on behalf of the Australian people, the parliament and his government. He also announced the establishment of a National Redress Scheme for victims of child sexual abuse; an Office of Child Safety within the Department of Social Services; and a National Centre of Excellence to raise awareness and understanding of the impacts of child sexual abuse, to deal with the stigma, to support help seeking and guide best practice for training and other services.

=== Aged care and disability ===
On 16 September 2018, Morrison revealed that a royal commission would be held into aged care facilities, focusing on the quality of care in residential, home and community aged care. On 5 April 2019, Morrison announced another commission, this time to examine violence, abuse, neglect and exploitation within the disability sector. The commission is headed by former Federal Court judge Ronald Sackville and will last for three years. Morrison was emotional at the announcement of the commission, paying tribute to his brother-in-law who has multiple sclerosis. The announcement was met with praise from Labor leader Bill Shorten, whose party had supported the idea in the past, as well as from Greens senator Jordon Steele-John, who had spent the previous year agitating for the government to support the policy and had heckled the government on the floor of the House of Representatives earlier in the year when it rejected holding a vote on a commission. In relation to disability funding, the government announced price increases of up to 22 per cent for NDIS service providers, though it was criticised for a $1.6 billion under-spend on the scheme in the budget. Labor argued the under-spend was due to the government's desire for a surplus budget, though the government countered that by arguing no one who needed care would be neglected and that the scheme was responding to actual demand.

=== Food safety ===
In response to the 2018 Australian strawberry contamination, Morrison announced an increase in the maximum jail term for the federal offence relating to contaminating food from 10 to 15 years. However, when a woman was arrested for the crime, she was charged under the Queensland Criminal Code.

=== Education ===
The method of funding non-government schools was changed from using census data to using parental tax information; to take effect in 2020. On 20 September, Morrison announced a $4.6 billion funding deal over 10 years starting from 2020 for Catholic and Independent schools as a peace deal with two non-government sectors, after they bitterly opposed the Coalition's 2017 school funding changes. The agreement was seen as controversial to some including Labor and the Australian Education Union, who cited the fact that it did nothing for public schools.

The National School Chaplaincy Programme, following the extension of its funding confirmed during the 2018 federal budget, will be the subject of a new agreement between the states and the commonwealth, requiring complaints against chaplains to be centrally recorded.

=== Indigenous affairs ===
Senator Nigel Scullion carried on as the Coalition's Minister for Indigenous Affairs in the Morrison government, and in a conciliatory move by Morrison, the former Prime Minister Tony Abbott was appointed the prime minister's Special Envoy on Indigenous Affairs, with a brief to focus on school attendance and performance. After initial scepticism, Abbott accepted the role.

==== Remote education ====
Abbott presented his first report to Parliament as Special Envoy in December. He recommended increasing substantially the salary supplements and the retention bonuses for teachers in very remote areas; waiving HECS debt of longer term teachers in very remote schools; incentives for communities to adopt debit card arrangements; an extension of the Remote School Attendance Strategy, with more local school buy-in and engagement; extension of the Good to Great Schools program that has reintroduced phonics and disciplined learning for further evaluation and emulation; and that the government should match the Australian Indigenous Education Foundation's private and philanthropic funding on an ongoing basis.

==== Australia Day ====
Morrison criticised Byron Shire Council for moving its citizenship ceremonies from Australia Day, rejecting calls to change the date of Australia Day and proposing a new national day to recognise Indigenous Australians.

In January 2019, the Morrison government made changes to the Australian Citizenship Ceremonies Code, requiring councils to hold the ceremonies on Australia Day or be stripped entirely of their rights to hold citizenship ceremonies. These changes were later overturned by the Labor Albanese government in late 2022.

==== Uluru Statement and Indigenous Voice to Parliament ====
Morrison has rejected the Uluru Statement from the Heart, characterising the recommended "Indigenous voice to Parliament" as a third chamber.

However, on 30 October 2019, Ken Wyatt AM, Minister for Indigenous Australians, announced the commencement of a "co-design process" aimed at providing an Indigenous voice to government. The Senior Advisory Group (SAG) is co-chaired by Professor Tom Calma AO, Chancellor of the University of Canberra, and Professor Dr Marcia Langton, Associate Provost at the University of Melbourne, and comprises a total of 20 leaders and experts from across the country. There was some skepticism about the process from the beginning, with the criticism that it did not honour the Uluru Statement from the Heart's plea to "walk with us in a movement of the Australian people for a better future". According to Michelle Grattan, "...it is notable that it is calling it a 'voice to government' rather than a 'voice to parliament' ". Morrison rejected the proposal for a voice to parliament to be put into the Australian constitution; instead, the voice will be enshrined in legislation. The government also said it would run a referendum during its present term about recognising Indigenous people in the constitution "should a consensus be reached and should it be likely to succeed".

=== Media ===
The government announced an inquiry into the Australian Broadcasting Corporation, following the sacking of managing director Michelle Guthrie and reports that Guthrie had resisted a call from ABC Chair Justin Milne to fire journalist Emma Alberici. Milne was replaced by Ita Buttrose.

=== Commonwealth Integrity Commission ===
In December, the Morrison government proposed a national integrity commission framework. The previous August, Griffith University researchers had laid out a plan for a Commonwealth Integrity Commission, and Attorney-General Christian Porter had been working on adapting the Australian Commission for Law Enforcement Integrity into an anti-corruption watchdog in the Turnbull government. The framework has been criticised for its narrow remit and the decision not to allow public hearings, and not being allowed to take tip-offs, as well as the high burden of proof needed before an investigation can take place.

The Morrison government tabled an exposure draft in 2020, but insisted that Labor would have to support it before the government brought it to a vote. The CIC was not part of the Morrison government's agenda during the 2022 election campaign.

=== Environment ===
Algal blooms caused the death of over 10,000 fish in the Darling River just before Christmas 2018. A second fish kill event happened in January, near the Menindee Lakes, which are a critical breeding ground for fish throughout the Murray-Darling. A report by the Productivity Commission was released in January 2019 that said that the Murray-Darling Basin Authority should be broken up. A third fish kill event occurred at the Menindee Lakes in late January. NSW Premier Gladys Berejiklian attributed the fish kills to the weather.

During the 2018–2019 summer season, there were also bushfires in Tasmania's heritage-listed areas and the 2019 Townsville flood. Melissa Price, the Minister for the Environment, was criticised as being absent from announcements made by Morrison, McCormack and David Littleproud on these events.

==== Drought assistance ====
As Morrison took office, much of eastern Australia was suffering severe drought. In a politically conciliatory move, he appointed former National Leader Barnaby Joyce as a Special Envoy for drought assistance and recovery. The cost of the special envoyship was $675,000 in total expenses. Joyce produced no reports as a result of his role, saying that he had texted the Prime Minister. Freedom of information requests for these texts have been denied by the PMO.

In October 2018, Morrison announced a drought assistance package, the Drought Future Fund, of $5 billion. The Drought Future Fund is intended to operate similarly to the Medical Futures Fund. However, the Drought Future Fund drew criticism from disability advocates, as $3.9 billion of the package's funding was drawn from money earmarked for the National Disability Insurance Scheme.

=== Land-clearing inquiry ===
The Morrison government announced an inquiry into land-clearing laws following the Queensland bushfires. The Queensland Government had introduced laws against broad-scale land-clearing in May 2018, and David Littleproud said "If Queensland’s laws are locking up agriculture’s potential and making fires worse, we need to know about it".

=== Medical transfer of refugees ===
On 12 February 2019, the Morrison government suffered the first substantive defeat on the floor of the House of Representatives since 1929, after the Labor Party and several cross-benchers supported amendments to the Home Affairs Legislation Amendment (Miscellaneous Measures) Bill 2018 (the Home Affairs Bill) proposed by the Senate. The proposed amendments would give greater weight to medical opinion in allowing the medical evacuation of asylum seekers to Australia from Nauru and Manus Island. Further amendments followed negotiations between the Opposition and the House of Reps cross-bench members, before the Senate considered and agreed to the amendments to its original amendments on the following day, 13 February. The amended legislation, which affected three laws, being the Migration Act 1958, the Customs Act 1901 and the Passenger Movement Charge Collection Act 1978, became known as "the Medevac Bill", before being passed in the House by 75 votes to 74 and passed in the Senate by 36 votes to 34.

In response to the bill passing into law, Morrison announced the re-opening of the Christmas Island detention centre, intimating that this change in the law would provide the signal that people smugglers to begin operating again. In the days following, Dutton said that because of this change in the law, Australians on waiting lists for hospital treatment and those already in public housing were going to be adversely affected. This was seen by Robert Manne as a turning point in Labor Party policy, after having had almost identical asylum seeker policies as the Coalition for the past five years. He also pointed out the numerous obstacles any potential people-smuggler or asylum seeker would have to face, because the deterrent aspects of the policy were still firmly in place, and the new legislation applied only to the approximately 1,000 people still on Nauru and Manus (of whom only a relatively small number will be allowed to access the urgent medical attention they need).

However, the 2018 ruling was overturned in December 2019, after 37 votes to 35 supported the government's move to repeal the law.

=== Uranium mine ===
Just prior to the federal election, Melissa Price approved the Yeelirrie uranium mine north of Kalgoorlie. Traditional owners challenged the former Barnett government's approval for the mine in court.

=== Final pre-selections for 2019 election ===
In November, reports emerged that the "moderate faction" of the NSW Liberal Party had relegated Liberal Senator Jim Molan to an "unwinnable" fourth position on the NSW Senate ticket, and were moving to dump conservative NSW MP Craig Kelly – a three term MP with a 9% margin in his electorate. The Australian's foreign editor Greg Sheridan called the move against Molan an act of "self-mutilation" against "the most capable, the best-known and the most impressive backbench senator in Australia". Journalist Michelle Grattan described Kelly as "all over the place in his comments", comparing media reports of Kelly's comments to branch members as reported by the ABC, and an interview with Sky News. Kelly indicated he might run as an independent if the Party dis-endorsed him, and Kent Johns was offered a $350,000 six-month job to withdraw from the preselection race by the president of Morrison's federal electoral conference.

When Morrison moved to head off the factional dispute over Kelly and others by using state executive powers to automatically endorse sitting members, Turnbull launched a failed intervention to prevent the outcome, hoping Kelly, a Dutton backer, would be ousted. Turnbull had approved a similar move by the Victorian state executive in July. He had also previously personally endorsed Kelly himself, but dismissed comparisons to his own intervention to save Kelly in 2016, citing recent campaigns in NSW to allow grassroots members more say in pre-selection contests as the reason for his intervention against Kelly this time.

When news of Turnbull lobbying against Kelly became public, Liberal MP Trent Zimmerman said that Turnbull's intervention "meant that it became an issue about the Prime Minister's authority, and that swung the dial in favour of acceding to the request the Prime Minister had made of the Executive". Moderate members of the NSW branch agreed to abstain from a vote, effectively allowing Kelly and other sitting members such as Jason Falinski, John Alexander and Lucy Wicks to be re-selected.

Journalists Michelle Grattan and Patricia Karvelas criticised the intervention for Kelly. Grattan wrote there had been no intervention in favour of moderate female candidate Jane Prentice, who had been an assistant minister. Karvelas wrote that it was extraordinary the party would intervene to "save a bloke" when "women MPs like Jane Prentice and Ann Sudmalis are not afforded the same intervention to stay on in Parliament when faced with preselection challenges." Zimmerman dismissed the comparison in an interview with Karvelas on ABC Radio, saying Sudmalis had quit, while Prentice's preselection had occurred prior to the instability occasioned by the departure of Turnbull. Despite being expected to win preselection, and being asked to remain by Morrison, Sudmalis had quit as a candidate for her marginal electorate following the removal of Turnbull as leader, citing grievances with the NSW division of the Party.

== 2019 federal election ==
Morrison called the election for 18 May 2019, the last date on which a concurrent election for both the Senate and House of Representatives could occur. The government was widely anticipated to lose the vote, as almost all public polling conducted before and during the campaign suggested the Labor Party was on track to win a narrow majority. The government's focus during the election was on providing income tax cuts for Australians in all tax brackets. Though both major parties policies on income tax cuts was similar in the short term, in the long term the Coalition sought to rise the top income threshold for the 19, 32.5 and 37 per cent tax brackets from July 2022, before eliminating the 37 per cent bracket in July 2024, which Labor considered fiscally irresponsible. The government also strongly opposed Labor's proposals to abolish cash refunds for franking credit recipients and negative gearing allowances for new properties.

The Coalition won 77 seats at the election and won 51.5% of the two-party preferred vote. Morrison credited the victory to voters he called "the quiet Australians".

== Second term of government 2019–2022 ==
=== Economy ===
In its second term of office, the Morrison government initially continued the Coalition's program of tax cuts and Budget deficit reduction, however the arrival of the COVID-19 pandemic in Australia from early 2020 led to a dramatic increase in government expenditure and a brief recession by September 2020. The second Frydenberg Budget was delayed until October 2020, with the global economy facing its greatest crisis since the Great Depression. Two years into the pandemic, the economy was recovering strongly. By December 2021, the economy was 3.4 per cent bigger than it had been before the commencement of the pandemic, and unemployment was at 4.2%, which was lower than it had been prior to the pandemic. During the period, the Morrison government concluded free trade agreements with Indonesia, the United Kingdom and India. These followed on from the Japan, South Korea and China free trade agreements negotiated by the Coalition during the term of the Abbott government.

==== Income tax cuts ====
The government's income tax cut election commitments were legislated in the form of the Treasury Laws Amendment (Tax Relief So Working Australians Keep More Of Their Money) Bill 2019. In total the legislation provided $158 billion in income tax cuts. Despite opposing Stage 3 of the legislation (set to come into effect after 2022) which flattened the tax rate to 30% for all workers earning between $45,000 and $200,000, the Labor Party voted in favour and only the Greens voted against the bill.

==== 2020 Coronavirus recession ====
On 2 September 2020, Australia was declared to be officially in a recession as GDP fell 7 per cent in June, the first time since the early 1990s. However, by December 2020 Australia was out of the recession after recording a GDP growth rate of 3.3% in the September quarter. As part of the Coronavirus-recession, Frydenberg attempted to wind back Rudd-era reforms to responsible lending obligations.

=== Climate change, Net Zero ===
In 2021, the Morrison government announced its support for Net Zero by 2050.

=== Defence, Foreign Affairs and Trade ===
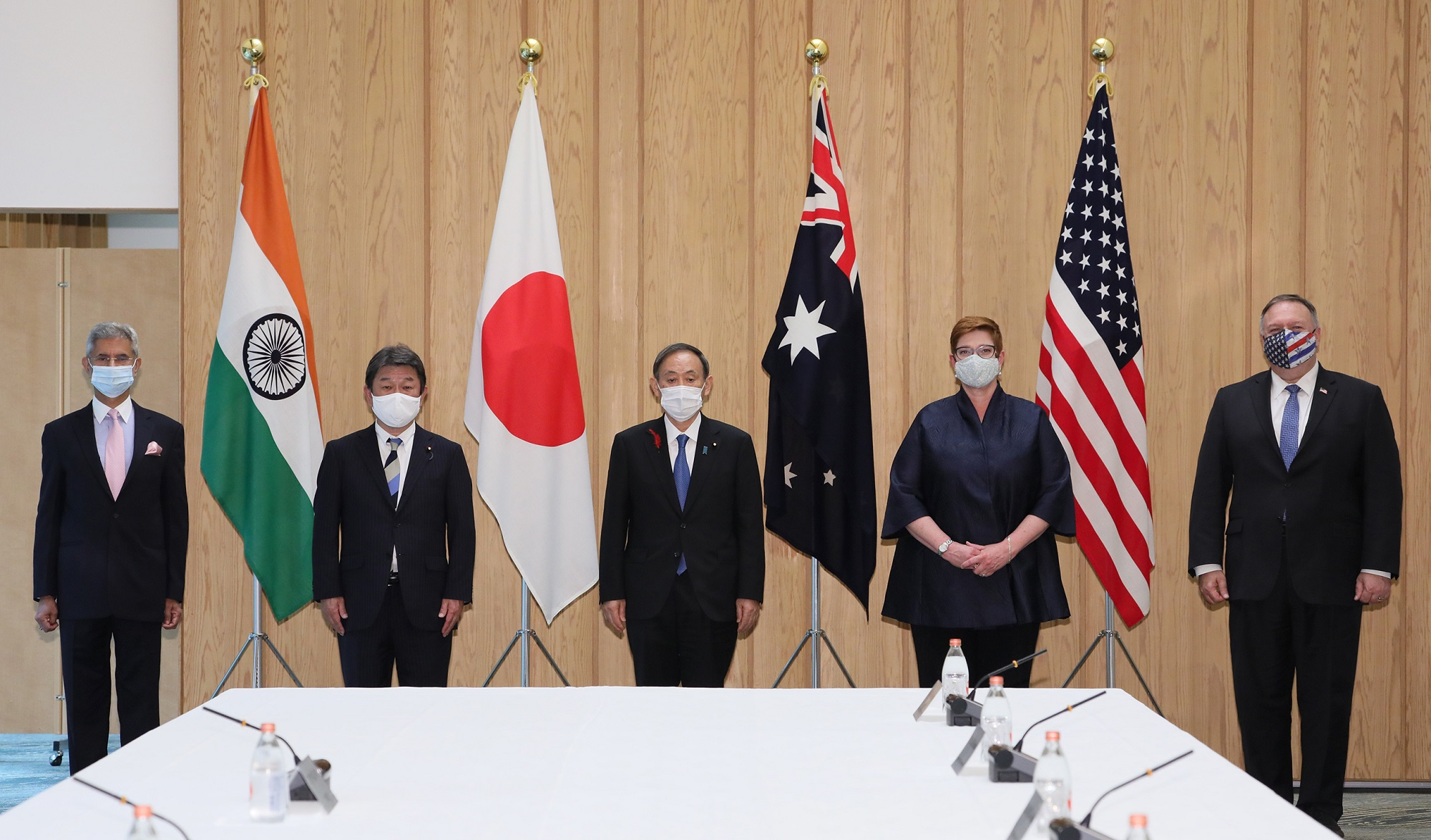
Foreign Minister Marise Payne at a Quad meeting with Japanese Prime Minister Yoshihide Suga, the Indian Foreign Minister, and the U.S. Secretary of State

==== New Zealand ====
The Morrison government continued the Australian policy of deporting non-citizens who had committed crimes under Section 501 of the Migration Act 1958, which was enacted by the Abbott government in December 2014. New Zealanders residing in Australia were particularly affected by the policy; with 1,300 having been repatriated to New Zealand by July 2018. Due to the close bilateral relations between the two countries, New Zealanders in Australia enjoy special work and residency rights. In response to Prime Minister Jacinda Ardern's criticism that the deportation policy was having a "corrosive" effect on bilateral relations, Morrison defended the policy on law and order grounds.

In February 2021, Morrison defended his government's decision to revoke the citizenship of dual Australian–New Zealand citizen Suhayra Aden, who had become an ISIS bride. Ardern had criticised the decision, accusing Australia of abandoning its citizens. Following a phone conversation, the two Prime Ministers agreed to work together to resolve Aden's situation. In August 2021, Aden and her children were repatriated to New Zealand.

Despite disagreements on immigration issues, Australia and New Zealand have collaborated on other international issues. In December 2020, Wellington sided with Canberra during a dispute with China over a controversial social media post by Chinese Foreign Ministry spokesperson Zhao Lijian accusing Australia of committing war crimes in Afghanistan in response to the Brereton Report. In late May 2021, Morrison and Ardern issued a joint statement in Queenstown affirming bilateral cooperation on the issues of COVID-19, bilateral relations, security issues in the Indo-Pacific such as the South China Sea dispute, and human rights in Hong Kong and Xinjiang. In March 2022, Wellington also supported Canberra's concerns about a planned security pact between China and the Solomon Islands.

In late March 2022, Home Affairs Minister Karen Andrews and New Zealand Immigration Minister Kris Faafoi announced that Australia had accepted a longstanding New Zealand offer to accept 150 refugees a year from the Nauru Regional Processing Centre or asylum seekers temporarily in Australia for "processing." While Morrison's Labor predecessor Julia Gillard and her New Zealand counterpart John Key had initially reached the refugee resettlement deal in 2012, subsequent Liberal governments had reneged on New Zealand's offer due to concerns that it would encourage more asylum seekers to use New Zealand as a backdoor for immigrating to Australia.

==== Brereton Report ====
The Brereton Report into war crimes allegedly committed by the Australian Defence Force (ADF) during the War in Afghanistan between 2005 and 2016 delivered its final report on 6 November 2020. The redacted version was released publicly on 19 November 2020. The report found evidence of 39 murders of civilians and prisoners by (or at the instruction of) members of the Australian special forces, which were subsequently covered up by ADF personnel. The Morrison government established a new Office of the Special Investigator to investigate further criminal conduct and recommend prosecution of individuals involved. In December 2020, Home Affairs Minister Peter Dutton appointed former Judge of the Supreme Court of Victoria, Mark Weinberg as the Special Investigator. The Department of Defence released a plan to respond to the findings of the Brereton Report on 30 July 2021.

==== Evacuation of Afghanistan ====
During the 2021 evacuation of Afghanistan in August 2021, the Morrison government deployed 250 Australian soldiers and three Royal Australian Air Force aircraft to aid in evacuations. Morrison, Defence Minister Dutton and Foreign Minister Payne also called on the Taliban to "cease all violence against civilians and adhere to international humanitarian law and the human rights all Afghans are entitled to expect, in particular women and girls".

By 24 August, Morrison confirmed that Australian and New Zealand forces had evacuated more than 650 people from Hamid Karzai International Airport in five flights. In addition, Australian forces also assisted with the evacuation of six Fijian United Nations workers.

==== The Quad ====
The Morrison government embraced the Quadrilateral Security Dialogue between the Australia, India, Japan and the United States as a key pillar of its Indo-Pacific strategy. On 24 September 2021, US President Joe Biden hosted the first in-person Quad Leaders’ Summit with Prime Minister Morrison, Indian Prime Minister Modi and Japanese Prime Minister Suga in Washington. The leaders announced further initiatives on COVID-19 vaccines, technology and climate change, and launched Quad cooperation on clean energy supply chains, infrastructure, cyber, outer space, and cultivating next-generation STEM talent. The group is also widely perceived as a democratic counterbalance to the rise of authoritarian China. Outlining his vision for the organisation, Morrison said ahead of the meeting: "We are liberal democracies, that believe in a world order than favours freedom and we believe in a free and open Indo-Pacific. Because we know that's what delivers a strong, stable and prosperous region. The Quad is about demonstrating how democracies like ours... can get things done."

==== AUKUS ====
In September 2021 ahead of the Quad Leaders meeting in Washington, Morrison announced the AUKUS security pact between Australia, the United Kingdom and the United States in a joint virtual press conference with US President Joe Biden, UK Prime Minister Boris Johnson. As part of the pact, the United States and Britain will share defence technologies with Australia, including nuclear submarine technology for the first time. The agreement formed the most significant security arrangement between the three nations since World War Two, and came in the context of rapidly expanding naval and military spending by Communist China. As part of the deal, Australia scrapped a $90 billion submarine contract with a French State owned Naval company signed in 2016. French President Emmanuel Macron reacted angrily to the announcement, publicly accused Morrison of lying, and recalled France's ambassadors to Australia and the United States, as well as Malaysia and Indonesia. Macron's accusation was later said to have caused an avalanche of people disparaging Morrison's character, thought to have been a factor in the 2022 election loss. Morrison later said that the possibility of Australia losing all its submarine deals with no submarines as a result was the most stressful part of his prime ministership.

==== Australia–United Kingdom Free Trade Agreement ====
In December 2021, the Morrison government formally signed the Australia–United Kingdom Free Trade Agreement. The deal reduced restrictions on Australians to live and work in Britain, and will eliminate or phase out tariffs on a large range of products, including lamb, beef, sugar and dairy. The agreement was the first reached by Britain since its departure from the European Union, which had created barriers to trade between the two nations. The Government called it "the most comprehensive and ambitious free trade agreement that Australia has concluded, other than with New Zealand..."

==== Counter-terrorism ====
The Counter-Terrorism (Temporary Exclusion Orders) Act 2019 and related legislation passed the parliament on 25 July 2019. The legislation gives the Minister for Home Affairs the power to issue an order barring an Australian citizen over the age of 14 from being able to enter Australian sovereign territory. A Temporary Exclusion Order can only be issued when the Minister or ASIO (Australia's foreign intelligence agency) reasonably suspects that the person is likely to commit or enable an act of terrorism in Australia, and can last for a maximum of two years. All Temporary Exclusion Orders must be submitted for review to a reviewing authority (an Attorney-General-appointment former Justice), and can be revoked by the reviewing authority for any one of nine reasons. The government controversially rejected the amendments suggested by the Parliamentary Joint Committee on Intelligence and Security, which were supported by the opposition parties.

==== Russian invasion of Ukraine ====
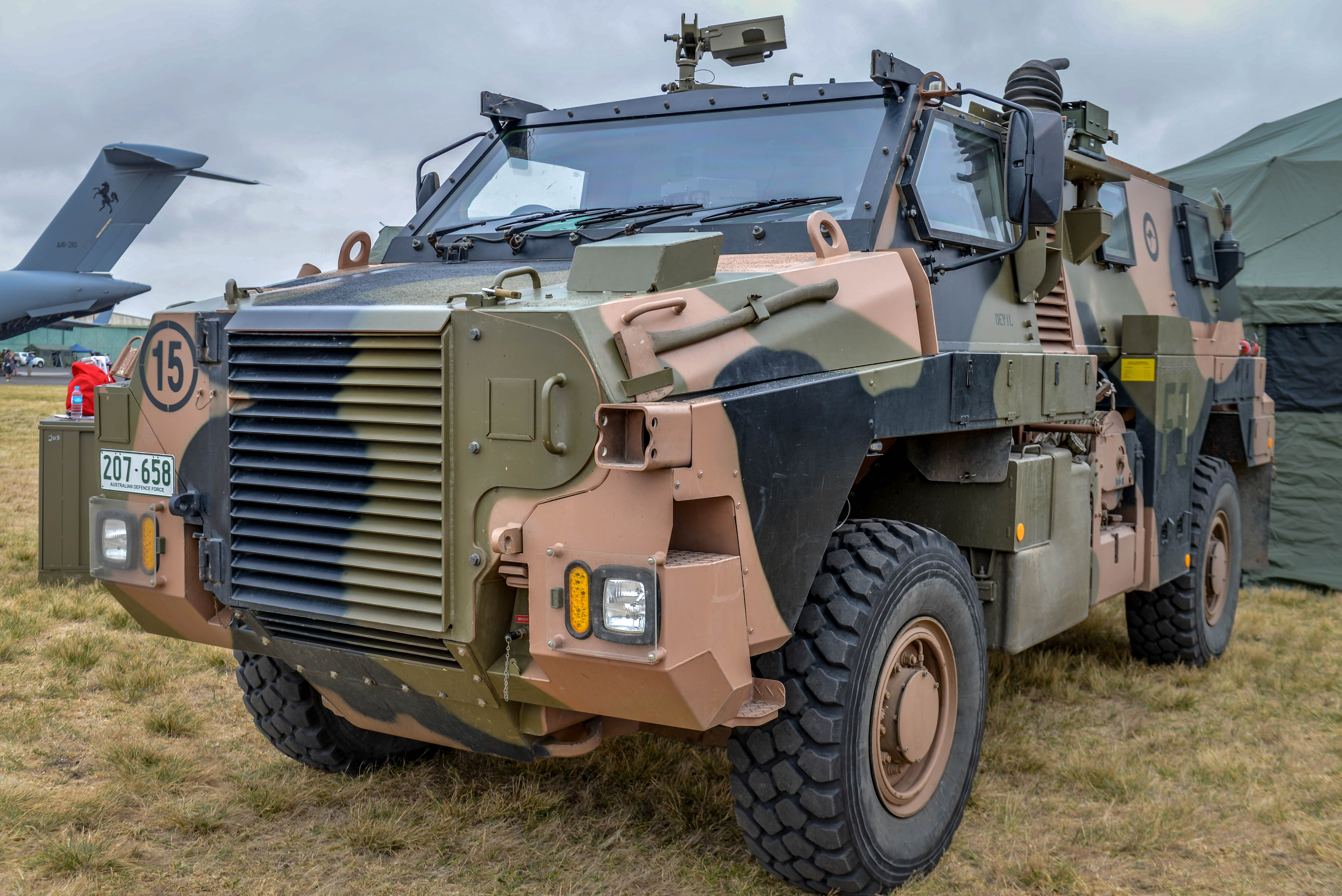
The Morrison government agreed to supply Australian-designed Bushmaster armoured vehicles to Ukraine at the request Ukrainian President Volodymyr Zelenskyy in 2022.

The Morrison government denounced the February 2022 invasion of Ukraine by the Russian dictator Vladimir Putin. Morrison told the nation on February 24 that the Russian government had launched a "brutal" and "unprovoked" invasion of Ukraine, and announced the imposition of sanctions on Russian interests. The Abbott government had previously taken a strong stance against Putin during the Russia's invasion of Crimea and incursions into Eastern Ukraine, as well as the shooting down of Malaysia Airlines Flight 17.

In the immediate aftermath of the 2022 invasion, Australia offered medical supplies, financial support and non-lethal military equipment to assist Ukraine. Morrison criticised China for not condemning the invasion, and accused the Chinese government of "throwing a lifeline" to Putin by lifting restrictions on trade with Russia.

In the weeks following the invasion, Australia committed $116 million in military aid to support the Ukrainian war effort. Ukrainian president Volodymyr Zelenskyy addressed the Australian Parliament on 31 March. Morrison called Zelenskyy a "Lion of Democracy" and told him ahead of his Parliamentary address: "Yes, you have our prayers, but you also have our weapons [and] our military aid. We stand with you, Mr President, and we do not stand with the war criminal of Moscow." Zelenskyy thanked Australia for its support, and requested Australian-designed Bushmaster armoured vehicles be sent to Ukraine. Morrison accepted the request.

==== Solomon Islands ====
In response to the 2021 Solomon Islands unrest, the Morrison government dispatched personnel from the Australian Federal Police and Australian Defence Force. This was done at the request of Prime Minister Manasseh Sogavare, who invoked the Australia–Solomon Islands Bilateral Security Treaty. The Morrison government stated that this deployment was to support the Royal Solomon Islands Police Force's efforts to main order and protect vital infrastructure in the island nation.

In late March 2022, Foreign Minister Marise Payne and Defence Minister Peter Dutton expressed opposition to a draft security pact between China and the Solomon Islands that would allow Beijing to deploy military forces in the country and establish a military base. In response to Canberra's criticism, Sogavare defended the security pact with China, criticising the leaking of the document and objecting to the Australian media's coverage of the security pact. In addition, the Chinese government defended the bilateral pact and rejected Australian criticism that Beijing was coercing the Solomon Islands.

==== India Free Trade Agreement ====
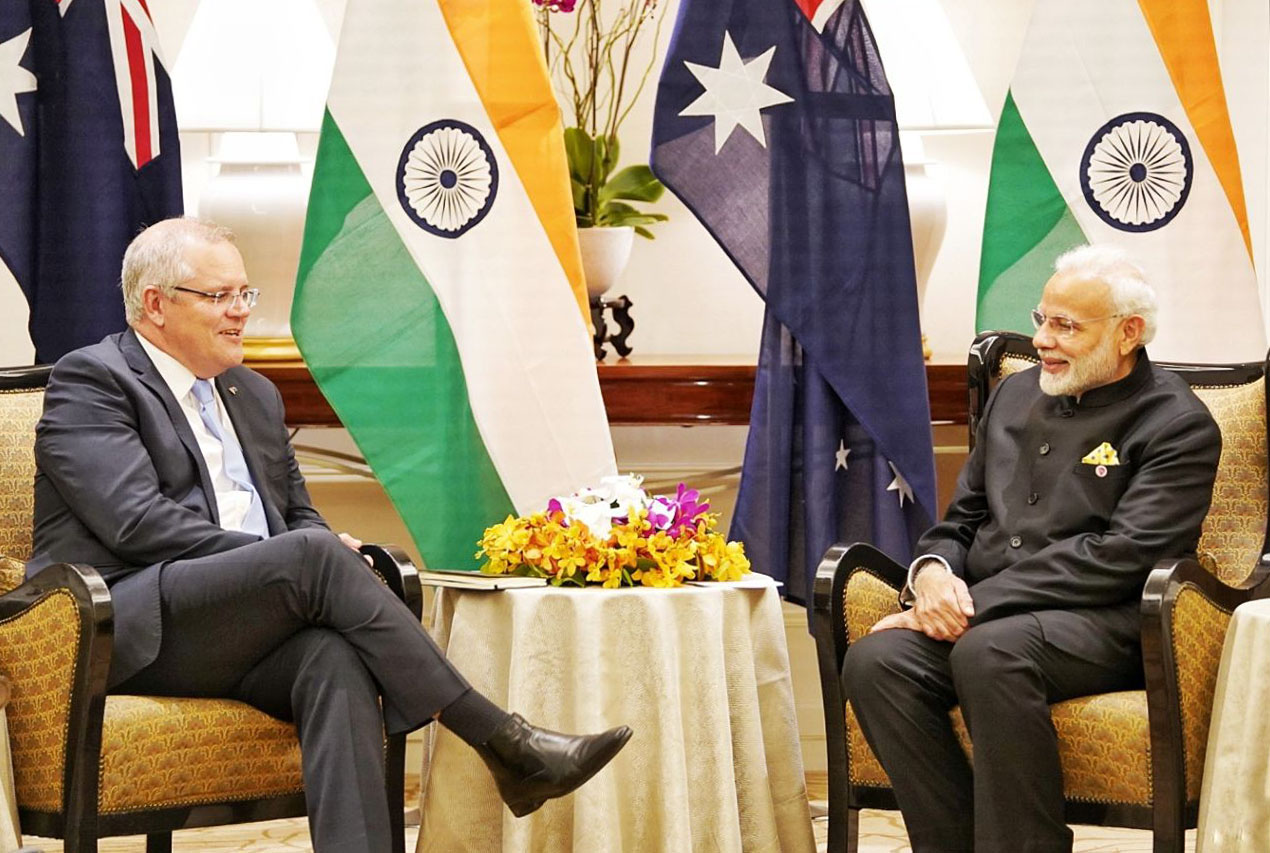
Australian Prime Minister Scott Morrison (left) and Indian Prime Minister Narendra Modi meeting on the sidelines of the East Asia Summit in Singapore, November 2018

Australia and India launched negotiations for the Australia-India Comprehensive Economic Cooperation Agreement (AI-CECA) in May 2011. Negotiations were suspended in 2015, but were revived in 2020 by Prime Ministers Morrison and Narendra Modi. On 2 April 2022, An interim agreement was signed by Trade Minister Dan Tehan and his Indian counterpart Piyush Goyal. "India and Australia are natural partners. Like two brothers, both nations supported each other during the COVID-19 pandemic. Our relationship rests on the pillars of trust and reliability", Minister Goyal said.

=== Infrastructure ===
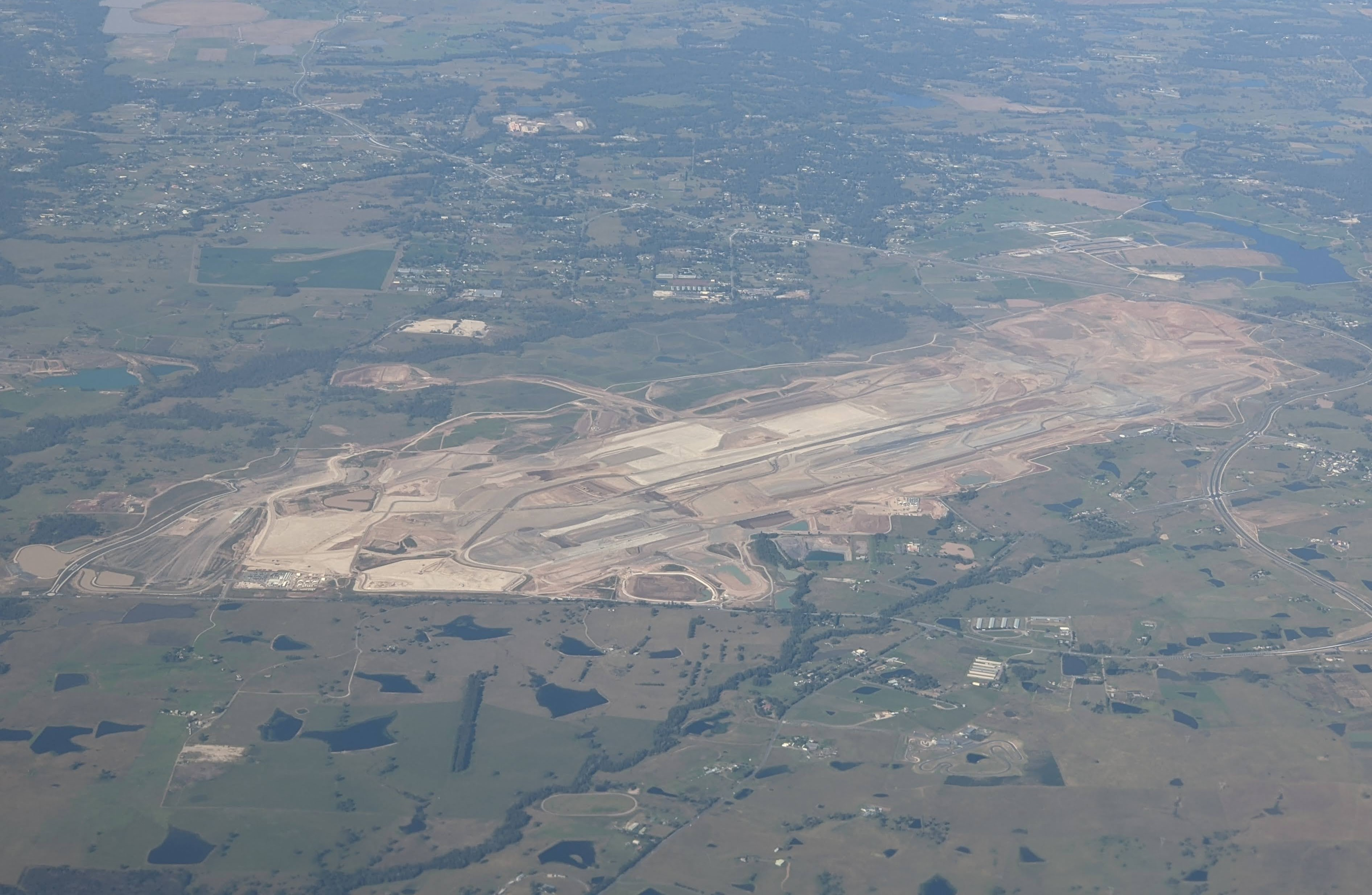
Aerial view of Western Sydney Airport construction site in 2021

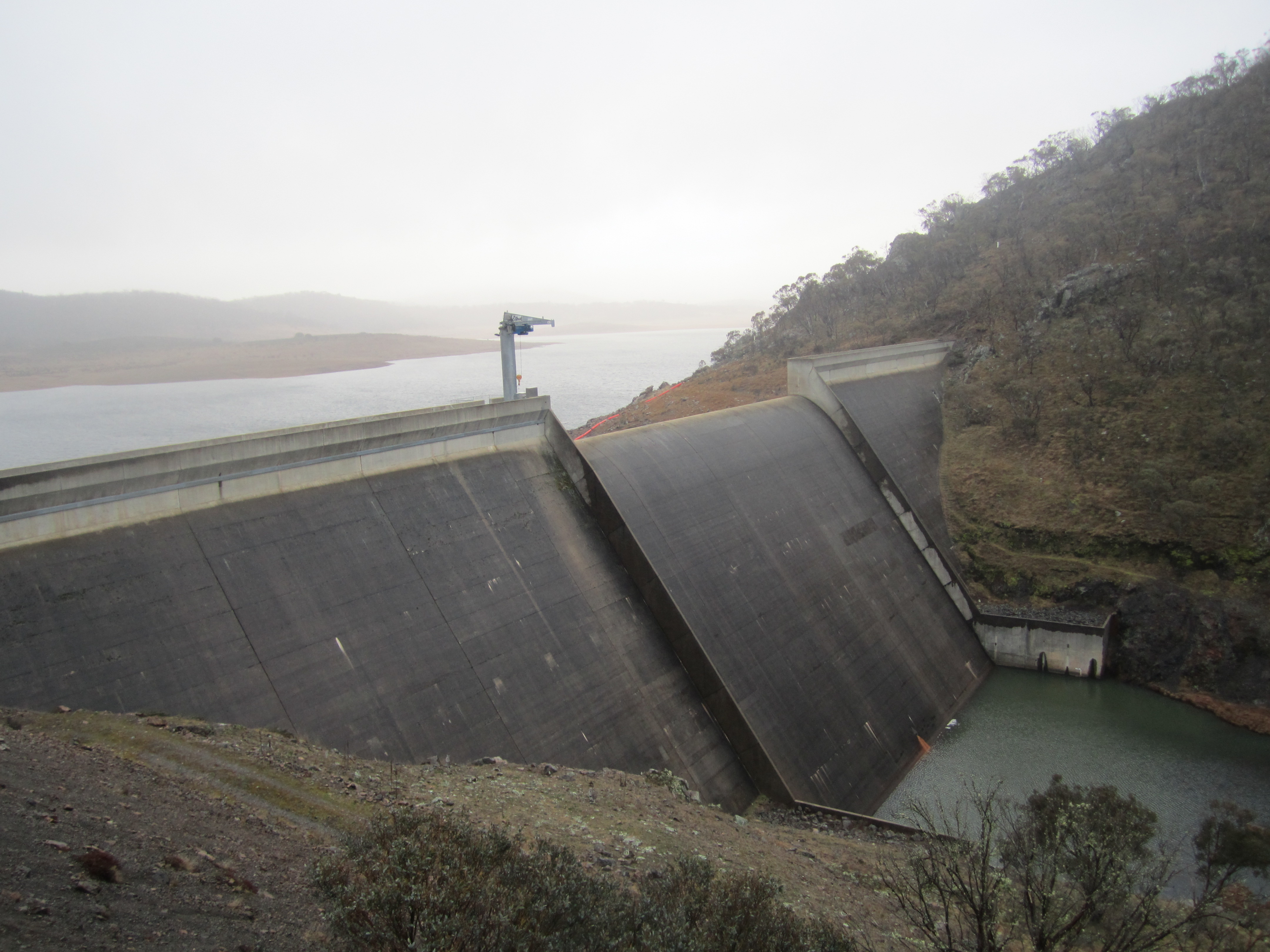
Tantangara Dam, near the Snowy 2.0 pumped hydro construction site.

In April 2014, the Abbott government announced approval for the Western Sydney Airport, a second airport for the city at Badgerys Creek, 50 kilometres (31 mi) west of Sydney's CBD. In November 2021, Prime Minister Morrison said the Coalition government had invested over $14 billion to the project, creating 11,000 jobs. With terminal construction commencing, Morrison said the project was already 25 per cent complete "as a result of a great partnership, a partnership between the federal Liberals and Nationals and the state Liberals and Nationals working closely to secure Australia’s economic future and to secure the success of Western Sydney."

In 2017, the Turnbull government announced plans for Snowy 2.0, a $2bn construction project to increase the capacity of Snowy Hydro by 50% through 'pumped hydro' technology. Following extensive environmental and feasibility study, the Morrison government announced Federal approval for implementation of the project in June 2020. Unveiling a tunnel boring machine for Snowy 2.0 in December 2021, Morrison said: "Snowy 2.0 is building on the proud legacy of the first Snowy scheme, using local ingenuity to deliver landmark new infrastructure that will benefit Australia and the national electricity market for decades to come."

=== Indigenous Affairs ===
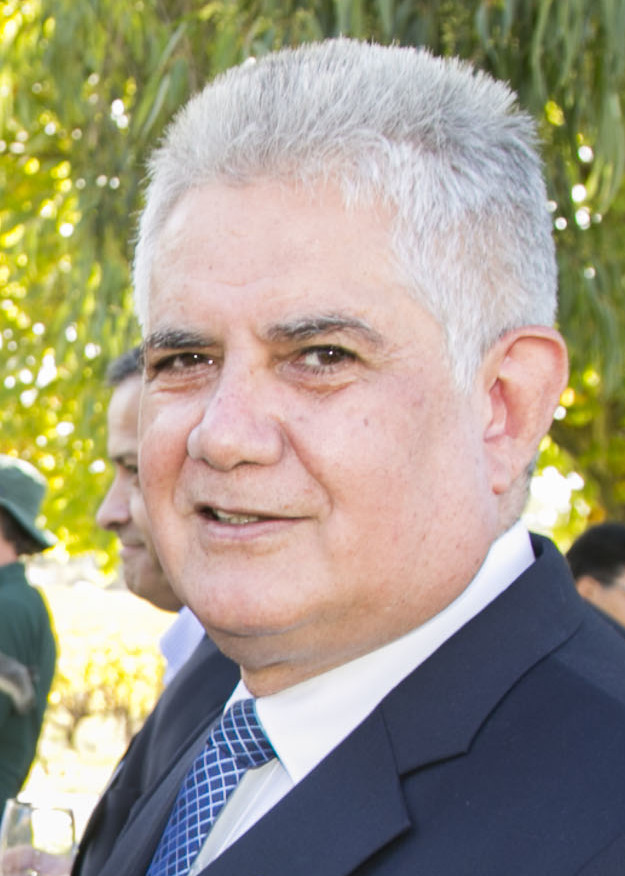
Ken Wyatt, the first indigenous Australian to sit in Cabinet

The Morrison government's second term commenced with the historic appointment of Ken Wyatt as Minister for Indigenous Australians in the Second Morrison Ministry. Wyatt became the first Aboriginal person to sit in Cabinet and hold the indigenous affairs portfolio.

in December 2020 Prime Minister Scott Morrison announced that he would be advising the governor-general to proclaim the change to Advance Australia Fair, changing one word in the opening couplet, from "we are young and free" to "we are one and free", to take effect on 1 January 2021.

On the eve of Australia Day, 2022, the Morrison government announced that it had transferred the Aboriginal flag's copyright to the Commonwealth. Prime Minister Morrison said the flag had been "freed" for all Australians to use without asking for permission or the need to pay someone. Copyright was originally held by the original designer Harold Thomas, however non-Indigenous company WAM Clothing had bought exclusive rights to the flag in November 2018.

=== Religious freedoms ===
The dispute between professional rugby player Israel Folau and Rugby Australia was a major story during the federal election campaign. In the previous parliament, the two major parties had been unable to agree on legislation which would have removed the right of religious schools to expel LGBT students and sack homosexual teachers. Amidst intense pressure from conservative MPs, the government in August 2019 released a draft bill focusing on religious freedom. The draft legislation included provisions preventing employers from limiting the religious expression of workers in their private capacity (unless the business can prove it is a "reasonable" limitation and necessary to avoid unjustifiable financial hardship) and explicitly overrides a Tasmanian anti-discrimination law, which prohibits conduct which "offends, humiliates, intimidates, insults or ridicules" based on protected grounds including gender, race, age, sexual orientation, disability and relationship status. The government had promised to introduce the bill to the parliament before the end of 2019 but objections from conservative religious groups and LGBTIQ equality advocates forced the government to delay and re-draft the bill. In March 2020 the government dropped draft legislation to protect gay students and teachers from being expelled or sacked from religious schools. In November 2021 the Cabinet signed off on a revised religious freedoms bill, that included a "statements of belief" protection, meaning such statements could not be considered discriminatory so long as they don't threaten, intimidate, harass or vilify a person or would be considered malicious to a "reasonable person". The statement of beliefs clause would override any countervailing state or territory laws. The bill retained a clause that allows faith-based institutions, such as religious schools and hospitals, to positively discriminate against people who do not share or practice their faith. These institutions would be required to have a publicly available policy that clearly explained how those religious views would be enforced.

The so-called "Folau clause", which would have protected someone from being sacked for expressing any religious belief, was dropped. Morrison introduced the Religious Discrimination Bill 2021 to the House of Representatives on 25 November 2021.

In early February, Morrison confirmed that he would seek support from the Liberal Party to amend the Sex Discrimination Act 1984 to scrap a clause allowing religious schools to discriminate against same-sex and gender diverse students. His announcement came in response to Citipointe Christian College's unsuccessful attempt to get families to sign an anti-gay and anti-trans enrolment contract. Morrison had earlier introduced religious discrimination legislation into the Australian Parliament protecting certain expressions of religious expression and overrode state laws limiting when religious schools can give preferentially employment to staff of the same faith. Morrison's plan to amend the Sex Discrimination Act drew opposition from the Australian Christian Lobby and Christian Schools Australia, which threatened to withdraw their support for Morrison's religious discrimination legislation. The national LGBT advocation organisation Equality Australia welcomed Morrison's commitment to amend the Sex Discrimination Act but called for the proposed religious discrimination legislation to be scrapped.

Following an all-night marathon sitting, the government's Religious Discrimination Bill 2022 passed its third reading in the House of Representatives, despite five Liberal MPs voting with the Labor Party to pass amendments to the Sex Discrimination Act banning religious schools from discriminating against students on gender and sexuality grounds following a failed attempt by the government to defeat its own legislation. This amended legislation was referred to the Senate, where the government chose to remove the bill from consideration until after the 2022 election.

=== Electoral Reforms ===
==== Voter ID ====
In Late 2021 the government had plans for a Voter ID Law, the electoral committee had recommended it after the 2013, 2016 and 2019 elections. Under the proposed voter integrity bill, a voter unable to produce ID can still vote if their identity can be verified by another voter, or by casting a declaration vote, which requires further details such as date of birth and a signature. One Nation leader, Pauline Hanson, has claimed credit for the Coalition's voter integrity bill, saying she made voter identification a condition for her support.

The Labor party and the Greens were opposed to the Voter ID bill, forcing the government to approach the remaining crossbench senators – Griff Stirling, Rex Patrick and Jacqui Lambie – to try and pass the bill. After Senator Patrick came out against the Bill, calling it "a solution looking for a problem" and Senator Lambie announced her intention to vote against the bill siting more time was required to consider the bill, the government announced that they would defer the issue until after the election.

==== Party Registration ====
Also The government had In August 2021, the Electoral Legislation Amendment (Party Registration Integrity) Bill 2021 legislation which passed. The bill that made the rules surrounding the registration of political parties stricter. The membership requirements for a party was increased from 500 to 1500, and parties could not have names that were too similar to political parties registered before them.

The tightening of party registration rules was reportedly due to an increase of parties on the Senate ballot, which resulted in the requirement of magnifying sheets for some voters to read the ballot, and a perception that voters would be misled by names of some minor parties.

=== Industrial relations ===
The government introduced legislation that would tighten the rules around the behaviours of unions and their officials. The legislation, named the Ensuring Integrity Bill, would allow automatic disqualifications of "registered organisations" and grant the Federal Court the power to prevent officials from holding office in certain circumstances and broaden the court's power to order remedial action with respect to union disputes and governance. Trade union groups, Labor and the Greens opposed the bill, saying it was "contrary to international law and Australia’s commitments" and "hostile to the interests of working people". Industry groups and the Business Council of Australia argued the bill would "raise standards of conduct in the system" and would enforce penalties against "recalcitrant organisations".

The legislation passed the House of Representatives where the government had a majority, though failed to pass the Senate in late November 2019, after the third reading was deadlocked at 34-34 votes. The votes of crossbench Senators Jacqui Lambie and Pauline Hanson were crucial to the outcome, with the government having brought the legislation to a vote under the impression Hanson and her One Nation party colleague would support the bill. The government responded by refusing to rule out the possibility of bringing back the legislation at a later date if it felt it could command newfound support in the Senate.

=== 2019–20 Bushfires ===
The 2019–20 Australian bushfire season followed a long drought and witnessed one of the most prolonged and severe bushfire emergencies in Australian history. Fires commenced in Queensland and New South Wales in September 2019. While touring bushfire hit communities in Queensland on 13 September, Morrison announced that people affected by the fires would be eligible for additional financial assistance of up to 13 weeks of support payments equivalent to the maximum rate of the Newstart Allowance. By November, fires had ignited in all states, and the severity of the fires worsened through December. On 11 December the Morrison government committed an $11 million grant to the National Aerial Firefighting Centre (NAFC), which coordinates the air fleet of federal, state and territory governments. On 4 January, the Prime Minister confirmed that the grant would become a permanent annual increase, and committed $20m to lease four extra large air tankers to combat the fires.

On Christmas Eve 2019 the government granted public service volunteer firefighters an extra four weeks paid leave, and committed up to $6000 for volunteers from the private sector on 26 December. The government also announced on 26 December an additional deployment of Australian Defence Force (ADF) assistance, with specialist defence personnel being sent to advise NSW fire incident controllers at the 14 control centres around the state, to free up ADF resources such as bulldozers, bulk water carriers and troops for firefighting use. The fresh deployment joined ADF personnel already providing helicopter search and rescue, transport, accommodation, meals and refuelling to the firefighting effort. On 4 January the government announced the call up of an additional 3000 Army reservists to help with bushfire recovery efforts, along with the opening of defence force bases for emergency short-term accommodation, and the deployment of defence aircraft to assist in firefighting and HMAS Adelaide, to sit off the coast should it be required to help with evacuations. On 9 January Morrison committed $2 billion to a national bushfire recovery fund.

The extent of the bushfires led to controversy over the federal response to the fires and its policies on reducing or adapting to climate change, after ministers initially downplayed the severity of the crisis. On 20 December Morrison cut short a family holiday to Hawaii after four days, amid an outcry that he had left the country during a crisis.

=== Sports rorts scandal ===
The "sports rorts" affair led to the resignation of Bridget McKenzie from the cabinet. The subsequent election of a new deputy leader of the National Party turned into the 2020 National Party of Australia leadership spill when Barnaby Joyce unsuccessfully challenged for the leadership. McKenzie was reappointed to the cabinet 17 months later.

A report by Phil Gaetjens, the Secretary of the Department of the Prime Minister and Cabinet and Morrison's former chief-of-staff, found that the allocation of grants was not politically motivated, but that McKenzie had breached ministerial standards by allocating a grant to a gun club which she was a member of. The Gaetjens report was not released, with Senate leader Mathias Cormann claiming public interest immunity. Morrison maintained at this time that the grants program was not politically motivated, and that all projects that were funded were eligible, disputing the Auditor-General's report, which found that 43% of projects funded were ineligible, and that the grants program disproportionately favoured marginal and target seats. It was later found that the offices of Bridget McKenzie and Scott Morrison exchanged 136 emails concerning the sports grants, and McKenzie breached caretaker convention to make changes to the list of projects to be funded after the election was called, in at least one instance at the direction of the Prime Minister's Office. Morrison denies involvement.

=== Coronavirus ===
The Morrison government announced an economic stimulus package to combat the effects of coronavirus on the economy.

On 12 March 2020 the government announced a A$17.6 billion stimulus package, the first since the 2008 financial crisis. The package consists of multiple parts, a one-off A$750 payment to around 6.5 million welfare recipients as early as 31 March 2020, small business assistance with 700,000 grants up to $25,000 and a 50% wage subsidy for 120,000 apprenticies or trainees for up to 9 months, $1 billion to support economically impacted sectors, regions and communities, and $700 million to increase tax write off and $3.2 billion to support short-term small and medium-sized business investment.

On 30 March the Australian Government announced a $130 billion "JobKeeper" wage subsidy program, Scott Morrison later admitted there was a $60 billion error in the calculation. The JobKeeper program would pay employers up to $1500 a fortnight per full-time, part-time or casual employee that has worked for that business for over a year. For a business to be eligible, they must have lost 30% of turnover after 1 March of annual revenue up to and including $1 billion. For businesses with a revenue of over $1 billion, turnover must have decreased by 50%. Businesses are then required by law to pay the subsidy to their staff, in lieu of their usual wages. This response came after the enormous job losses seen just a week prior when an estimated 1 million Australians lost their jobs. This massive loss in jobs caused the myGov website to crash and lines out of Centrelink offices to run hundreds of metres long. The program was backdated to 1 March, to aim at reemploying the many people who had just lost their jobs in the weeks before. Businesses would receive the JobKeeper subsidy for 6 months.

The announcement of the JobKeeper wage subsidy program is the largest measure announced by the Australian Government in response to the economic impact of the COVID-19 Outbreak. In the first hour of the scheme, over 8,000 businesses registered to receive the payments. The JobKeeper wage subsidy program is one of the largest economic packages ever implemented in the history of Australia.

In September 2020 the Australian Government passed changes to "JobKeeper" wage subsidy program. From 28 September, the payment will fall to $1,200 a fortnight, followed by a further drop at the beginning of January 2021 to $1,000. Morrison promised in September 2020 that Australians stranded overseas would be “home by Christmas“, without consulting the rest of government.

=== Parliamentary workplace culture & sexual assault allegations ===
During the term of the Morrison government, allegations of misconduct by Parliamentary members and staffers of the government, Opposition and cross benchers became a matter of intense scrutiny, as part of wider societal debate on the topic of the eradication of bullying, sexual harassment and sexual assault. These events led to widespread debate and demonstrations against mistreatment of women in Parliamentary workplace culture, as well as to debates about media coverage and due process.

Independent Review into Commonwealth Parliamentary Workplaces

On 5 March 2021, the Morrison government established the Independent Review into Commonwealth Parliamentary Workplaces, with support from the Opposition and crossbench. The review was conducted by the Australian Human Rights Commission and led by the Sex Discrimination Commission. The Review's Terms of Reference asked for recommendations to ensure that Commonwealth parliamentary workplaces were safe and respectful, reflecting best practice in the prevention and handling of bullying, sexual harassment and sexual assault. The report found that men in parliament were "more likely to perpetrate sexual harassment, while women were more likely to bully". On 8 February 2022, the Parliament issued a Statement of Acknowledgement of an "unacceptable history of workplace bullying, sexual harassment and sexual assault in Commonwealth Parliamentary Workplaces" which committed the Parliament to "continuing to build safe and respectful workplaces."

Rape allegations

Two separate historical rape allegations became public in February 2021, one regarding the alleged conduct of the Morrison government's Attorney General Christian Porter when he was a child, and one regarding the alleged rape of a female Liberal staffer by a male staffer in the office of the Defence Minister Linda Reynolds after hours, in the lead up to the 2019 election campaign. The allegations followed a similar allegation against the former Labor Opposition Leader Bill Shorten, and emerged as female Labor staffers were also coming forward with allegations of sexual harassment and abuse by some male Labor colleagues in the workplace.

Claims of "workplace harassment", "systemic misogyny" and "victim blaming" in Parliament were widely aired.

On 15 February 2021, Brittany Higgins, a former staffer in the office of Defence Minister Linda Reynolds came forward in the media with an allegation that, in March 2019, she had been raped by a male staffer in the office of the Defence Minister after being taken their after hours following a heavy drinking session. Higgins took the matter to police on 24 February, and investigations are ongoing. Higgins said the support offered by her Liberal bosses had been inadequate after the alleged rape.

After the ABC had announced that a "cabinet minister" was the subject of rape allegations, Attorney-General Christian Porter came forward on 3 March 2021, to confirm that he had been the subject of the allegation that in 1988, when he was a 17-year-old boy, he had raped a 16-year-old girl. He denied the allegation. The woman who had made the allegation committed suicide in June 2020. NSW police pronounced the matter closed on the basis of "insufficient admissible evidence to proceed". Porter is currently suing the ABC for defamation, and the matter remains ongoing. The ABC campaigned strongly for the removal of the Attorney General. ABC political correspondent Laura Tingle argued in an 3 March editorial for the 7:30 program that it did not matter if he been found guilty of a crime beyond reasonable doubt, but that "perception" was sufficient for his removal. She dismissed comparisons made by Porter to Labor leader Bill Shorten.

An Essential poll found that 65% of respondents (including 76% of Labor supporters, 51% of Coalition supporters and 88% of Greens supporters) said that the government was more interested in protecting itself than women.

As well as the Labor and Greens parties, the government faced criticism from within its own party. Former Prime Minister Malcolm Turnbull, who had been made aware of the allegations against Porter in 2019, criticised him for taking too long to come forward. Former Prime Minister John Howard, however, defended Morrison's decision not to open an independent inquiry into Porter's conduct.

Australian of the Year and sexual assault survivor advocate Grace Tame also criticised Morrison's rhetoric. Tame lambasted at Morrison at her NPC address, criticising Morrison's use of the “as a father” phrase, as well as saying "It shouldn't take having children to have a conscience."

Prima facie case on Christian Porter

In October 2021, the Morrison government successfully voted against sending government MP Christian Porter to the privileges committee regarding his blind trust. This vote was significant because the Speaker Tony Smith had determined there was a Prima facie case and in voting down the motion, the Morrison government became the first government to refuse a referral from the Speaker since Federation. The move from the government attracted significant criticism in the media.

Additionally, the Leader of the House Peter Dutton did not allow crossbench MPs remoting into Parliament (due to COVID) to vote on the motion even though the Senate allows voting in such a fashion. If MPs were permitted to vote remotely the vote likely would have ended in a tie, giving the Speaker the deciding vote.

Senator Kimberley Kitching

In March 2022, Labor Senator Kimberley Kitching died of a heart attack, aged 52. Journalists revealed that in the lead up to her death she had been seeking assistance for alleged bullying by senior Labor Senators Penny Wong, Kristina Keneally and Katy Gallagher. At the Senator's funeral, her husband said a "cantankerous cabal" had targeted the late Senator. Morrison called for Labor to conduct an investigation. Opposition Leader Anthony Albanese refused to open an investigation, citing "respect" for Kitching as the reason.

=== Car park rorts affair ===
The Morrison government was accused of ‘pork-barrelling’ over a $660 million commuter car park program that saw a large number of promised car parks targeted at Liberal Party held seats considered at risk in the 2019 election.

The Australian National Audit Office ‘found that the federal government cash splash was ‘not administered appropriately and that there was no consultation with state governments and councils about where the money was needed.' It further found that 'there is little evidence to demonstrate that the selection of commuter car park projects was based on assessed merit against the investment principles or achievement of the policy objective.' This led to claims that the government's commuter car park program was an example of 'pork-barelling', which was amplified after a number of the proposed car parks were found to be unsuitable and cancelled.

=== Internal criticism ===
Prime Minister Scott Morrison was subject to internal criticism when texts from his Coalition colleagues were leaked in January and February 2022. In January 2022, texts from a senior cabinet minister in the Morrison government, sent to former NSW Premier Gladys Berejiklian were revealed, where the minister labelled the Prime Minister a “horrible, horrible person” and a “complete psycho”. This was soon followed by leaked texts sent from Deputy Prime Minister Barnaby Joyce, who in March 2021 labelled the Prime Minister “a hypocrite and a liar” in text messages. Joyce offered his resignation to the Prime Minister but the offer was declined.

In 2022, New South Wales state MP Catherine Cusack accused Morrison of politicising the Lismore floods and not doing enough to assist flood relief. Sitting Liberal Senator Concetta Fierravanti-Wells accused Morrison of being “unfit for office", an "autocrat", and a "bully" with "no moral compass". She also suggested Scott Morrison "has used his so-called faith as a marketing advantage".

=== Cabinet appointments ===
In August 2022, it was revealed that Prime Minister Scott Morrison had secretly been appointed to six ministerial roles: Treasurer, Health Minister, Minister for Industry, Science and Energy, Minister for Resources, Minister for Finance and Minister for Public Service. His colleagues say that they were unaware of his "secret appointments".

== 2022 federal election ==
The 2022 federal election was called by Morrison on 10 April 2022, when he visited the Governor-General advising the latter to prorogue Parliament and dissolve the House of Representatives. The Governor-General accepted Morrison's recommendations, as is the custom in Australia's Westminster system of government. The Parliament was then prorogued and the House of Representatives dissolved the next morning.

The election was held on 21 May 2022. As of 10:00PM AEST on election night, the Labor Party (led by Anthony Albanese) was projected to form a government by ABC News, although it was not clear whether they would have a majority or a minority. Notable outcomes included the popularity of community independents in several inner-city seats, costing Treasurer and Deputy Liberal Leader Josh Frydenberg his seat; a particularly sizable swing from the Coalition to Labor in Western Australia; and notably strong support for the Australian Greens in some inner-city Brisbane seats.

After the bulk of the votes had been counted and a Labor victory appeared inevitable, Morrison conceded the election, and then announced his intention to resign as the Liberal Party leader. The Coalition's loss was attributed to Morrison's unpopularity with voters and the popularity of centrist "teal independents" in certain inner-city electorates. Albanese, who also made history as the first Italian-Australian to secure the position of Prime Minister, was sworn in as the new Prime Minister of Australia on 23 May 2022.

== See also ==
- 2018 Liberal Party of Australia leadership spills
- 45th Parliament of Australia (first term of government)
- 46th Parliament of Australia (second term of government)
- 2020 Eden-Monaro by-election
- 2020s in Australia political history
