= 2020 Australian federal budget =

Australian federal budget 2020
- Submitted: 6 October 2020
- Submitted by: Morrison government
- Submitted to: House of Representatives
- Country: Australia
- Parliament: 46th
- Party: Liberal/National Coalition
- Treasurer: Josh Frydenberg
- Total revenue: $523.0 billion
- Program spending: $651.9 billion
- Deficit: $134.2 billion
- Website: 2020–21 Budget archive

The 2020 Australian federal budget was the federal budget to fund government services and operations for the 2020–21 financial year. The budget was presented to the House of Representatives by Treasurer Josh Frydenberg on 6 October 2020. It is the seventh budget to be handed down by the Liberal/National Coalition since their election to government at the 2013 federal election, and the second budget to be handed down by Frydenberg and the Morrison government.

Due to the COVID-19 pandemic and the subsequent economic recession, the budget was submitted five months later than the traditional annual date of the second Tuesday in May.

== Background ==
This budget shows Australia reported its largest budget deficit since the Second World War. The COVID-19 pandemic put a strain on Australia’s economy, and emergency measures were taken to keep Australians employed.

The 2020–21 budget, presented 5 months later than its traditional May date, will take this pandemic into account, especially for the Department of Home Affairs, with a COVID-19 response package. Regarding employment, a wage subsidy was introduced earlier in the year titled JobKeeper and JobSeeker, and a new hiring credit for employers in this budget called JobMaker.

== Debt and deficit ==
=== Deficit ===
The 2020–21 budget produced a net deficit of $134.2 billion.

=== Debt ===
Net debt in 2020–21 was $592.2 billion.

== See also ==
- Australian government debt
- Economy of Australia
- Taxation in Australia
