= 2019 Australian federal budget =

Australian federal budget 2019
- Submitted: 2 April 2019
- Submitted by: Morrison government
- Submitted to: House of Representatives
- Country: Australia
- Parliament: 45th
- Party: Liberal/National Coalition
- Treasurer: Josh Frydenberg
- Total revenue: $505.521 billion (25.2 % of GDP)
- Total expenditures: $493.327 billion (24.6% of GDP)
- Deficit: $85.3 billion (4.3% of GDP)
- Website: budget.gov.au
- Notes: Surplus = receipts - payments - net Future Fund earnings. Italics are estimates in the budget

The 2019 Australian federal budget was the federal budget to fund government services and operations for the 2019–20 financial year. The budget was presented to the House of Representatives by Treasurer Josh Frydenberg on 2 April 2019. It was the sixth budget to be handed down by the Liberal/National Coalition since their election to government at the 2013 federal election, and the first budget to be handed down by Frydenberg and the Morrison government. All of the figures below are estimates published in the 2019-20 budget documents.

== Background ==
The 2019-20 Budget was delivered on 2 April 2019, earlier than the customary second Tuesday in May, with Treasurer Josh Frydenberg presenting what he characterised as a plan for a stronger economy built around four stated priorities: returning the budget to surplus, creating more jobs, providing lower taxes, and guaranteeing essential services including Medicare, schools, hospitals, and roads. The budget projected an underlying cash surplus of $7.1 billion for 2019-20, which the government described as the first time the budget had returned to surplus in over a decade, following a deficit of $4.2 billion recorded in 2018–19. The Morrison government framed the budget as a major fiscal turning point, projecting that surpluses would build over the forward estimates and that net debt would be eliminated by 2029-30.

== Forecasts ==
=== Revenues ===
==== Income taxation ====
Gross income tax withholding $218.1 billion

Gross other individuals $47.6 billion

Refunds $36.9 billion

Fringe benefits tax $3.93 billion

Company tax $98.9 billion

Superannuation taxation $9.71 billion

Petroleum resource rent tax $1.4 billion

==== Indirect taxation ====
Goods and services tax $67.364 billion

Wine equalisation tax $1.08 billion

Luxury car tax $640 million

Excise & customs duty $45.69 billion

Major bank levy $1.6 billion

Agricultural levies $520 million

Other taxes $6.763 billion

==== Non-taxation receipts ====
Sales of goods & services $15.745 billion

Interest received $5.701 billion

Dividends $6.165 billion

Other non-taxation receipts $11.512 billion

==== Memorandum ====
Capital gains tax $18.1 billion

Medicare levy $18.15 billion

Note: Capital gains tax is part of gross other individuals, company tax and superannuation fund taxes, while the Medicare Levy is included in income taxes.

=== Expenses ===
Total $500.872 billion

General public services $23.614 billion

Defence $32.243 billion

Public order & safety $5.919 billion

Education $36.350 billion

Health $81.777 billion

Social Security & Welfare $180.125 billion

Housing and community services $5.907 billion

Recreation & culture $3.849 billion

Fuel & energy $8.171 billion

Agriculture, forestry & fishing $2.871 billion

Mining, manufacturing & construction $3.442 billion

Transport & communication $9.038 billion

Other economic affairs $9.297 billion

Public debt interest $17.037 billion

Nominal superannuation interest $11.127 billion

General revenue assistance - States and Territories $69.053 billion

General revenue assistance - Local governments $1.275 billion

Natural disaster relief $11 million

Contingency reserve -$216 million

== Expenditure ==
The 2019-20 Budget committed to a total infrastructure investment of $100 billion over the next decade, representing the largest such allocation in Australia's history at that time. The centrepiece of transport spending was an expanded Urban Congestion Fund, raised from $1 billion to $4 billion, accompanied by a new $500 million Commuter Car Park Fund to improve access at suburban rail stations. A further $2 billion was directed toward a fast rail project connecting Geelong to Melbourne, alongside the establishment of a National Faster Rail Agency to oversee planning for rail corridors linking capital cities to regional centres in New South Wales, Victoria, and Queensland.

In health, the government committed total investment expected to reach $81.8 billion in 2019-20, rising to $89.5 billion by 2022-23. A ten-year, $5 billion investment plan for the Medical Research Future Fund was announced to support clinical trials, rare cancer research, and cardiovascular health. The budget also allocated $736.6 million over seven years for mental health services, with $461.1 million of that directed toward youth mental health, including funding for new headspace centres and the Early Psychosis Youth Services program.

For education, the government projected recurrent school funding of $19.9 billion in 2019, with a commitment to grow that figure to $32.4 billion by 2029, representing a 63 per cent increase in Commonwealth per-student funding. An additional $525.3 million was directed toward vocational education and training under the Delivering Skills for Today and Tomorrow package, which included a program to support up to 80,000 new apprenticeships in occupations experiencing skill shortages.

In aged care, the government allocated $282 million to provide 10,000 additional home care packages across all levels of support, and made 13,500 new residential care places available from 2018-19. A $320 million general subsidy boost for residential aged care was also included.

In the area of energy policy, the government committed $1.4 billion as an equity injection into Snowy Hydro 2.0, a pumped hydro project designed to add 2,000 MW of new renewable energy capacity to the National Electricity Market. A $2 billion Climate Solutions Fund was established to support emissions reduction activities, building on the former Emissions Reduction Fund.

Financial sector reform funding of more than $640 million was allocated in response to the Royal Commission into Misconduct in the Banking, Superannuation and Financial Services Industry, including over $400 million for ASIC and over $150 million for APRA.

== Debt and deficit ==
Deficit

The Budget deficit for 2018/19 is expected to be $4.162 billion, falling from $10.141 billion in 2017/18.

The surplus for 2019-20 is expected to be around $7 billion. The 2019-20 financial year ultimately recorded an underlying cash deficit of $85.3 billion, equal to 4.3 per cent of GDP. This represented a deterioration of $90.3 billion from the surplus projected at the time of the December 2019 Mid-Year Economic and Fiscal Outlook, with the reversal driven by the Australian Government's emergency fiscal response to the COVID-19 pandemic, which began affecting Australia from March 2020. Total cash payments exceeded the MYEFO estimate by $57.7 billion as programs including the JobKeeper wage subsidy, the Coronavirus Supplement, and the CashFlow Boost were deployed, while total receipts fell $33.1 billion below forecast as economic activity contracted. Net debt at the end of the 2019-20 financial year stood at $491.2 billion, equal to 24.8 per cent of GDP, which was $98.9 billion higher than had been estimated at the time of the MYEFO.

Debt

The 2019-20 Budget projected gross government debt at 27.9 per cent of GDP in 2019-20, with a stated medium-term goal of reducing it to 12.8 per cent of GDP. The actual outcome diverged markedly from these projections: the COVID-19 pandemic prompted an unprecedented fiscal response from March 2020 onward, and gross debt rose sharply as a result. By the end of the 2019-20 financial year, net debt stood at $491.2 billion, equal to 24.8 per cent of GDP, which was $98.9 billion higher than had been estimated at the time of the December 2019 Mid-Year Economic and Fiscal Outlook.

== Opposition and crossbench response ==
Opposition Leader Bill Shorten delivered his budget reply speech in the House of Representatives on 4 April 2019, two days after the budget was handed down. In the speech, Shorten framed his response around themes of economic fairness and equity, arguing that the government's proposed tax changes would ultimately undermine Australia's progressive tax system, with lower-paid workers facing the same marginal rate as high-income earners under the long-term Coalition plan.

Labor pledged to match the government's tax offset of up to $1,080 for workers earning between $48,000 and $126,000, but announced it would provide a larger tax cut than the Coalition to approximately 3.6 million Australians earning under $40,000, the majority of whom were women. Labor simultaneously announced it would repeal the government's proposed reduction of the 32.5 per cent tax rate to 30 per cent, which it characterised as a long-term flat-tax arrangement that would benefit high-income earners disproportionately.

The centrepiece of Shorten's response was a $2.3 billion Medicare Cancer Plan, described by Labor as the most significant overhaul of Medicare since the Hawke government. The plan included $600 million to eliminate out-of-pocket costs for diagnostic imaging for cancer patients, covering six million free scans over four years.

Shorten also committed Labor to restoring penalty rates in its first 100 days in government, to uncapping university places and creating up to 200,000 new positions, and to pursuing negative gearing reforms that would restrict the concession to new housing while leaving existing arrangements in place. On climate change, Shorten pledged that a Labor government would take direct action, including incentives for household battery storage.

Scholars analysing the speech noted that Shorten sought simultaneously to counter longstanding perceptions of Labor as a party of debt and deficit, by arguing that Labor's revenue measures including changes to franking credit refunds and negative gearing policy would produce larger surpluses than the Coalition's projections.

== Reception ==
Academic and expert reaction to the budget was mixed. Emeritus Professor David Hayward, an economist formerly associated with the Victorian Council of Social Service at RMIT, described the budget as a "mixed bag for the social economy," noting that while approximately $10.8 billion over five years was allocated to new spending initiatives, much of the near-term expenditure involved bringing forward pre-existing local government grants rather than new commitments, and that social services would face projected cuts in the outer years of the forward estimates.

Associate Professor Paul Burke of the Crawford School of Public Policy at the Australian National University criticised the climate policy provisions of the budget, observing that the $2 billion allocated to the Climate Solutions Fund had been extended from a ten-year to a fifteen-year program, which he argued represented limited ambition as the centrepiece of the government's climate policy.

Urban planning expert Professor Jago Dodson of RMIT's Centre for Urban Research raised concerns about the composition of infrastructure spending, questioning the prioritisation of road-widening projects over public transport investment, and noting that the $2 billion Geelong Fast Rail project had not been assessed by Infrastructure Australia and occupied that agency's lowest priority category.

Public health advocates welcomed certain elements of the budget while expressing reservations about others. Terry Slevin, Chief Executive of the Public Health Association of Australia, noted substantial commitments to mental health ($736 million) and the extension of the Child Dental Benefits Schedule ($1 billion) as positive measures, but argued that major contributors to preventable illness particularly obesity and alcohol received insufficient attention.

Professor Ian Frazer AC, President of the Australian Academy of Health and Medical Sciences, welcomed the government's ten-year commitment to the Medical Research Future Fund, but expressed disappointment at reductions in funding for universities and the Australian Research Council, which he described as essential to the basic research that enables clinical translation.

Universities Australia, representing the higher education sector, criticised the decision to reallocate $3.9 billion from the Education Investment Fund to a new Emergency Response Fund, arguing that the government had the fiscal capacity to fund both priorities simultaneously given the projected surplus.

== See also ==
- Australian government debt
- Economy of Australia
- Taxation in Australia
