= Australia–India Comprehensive Economic Cooperation Agreement =

Bilateral agreement, signed 2022

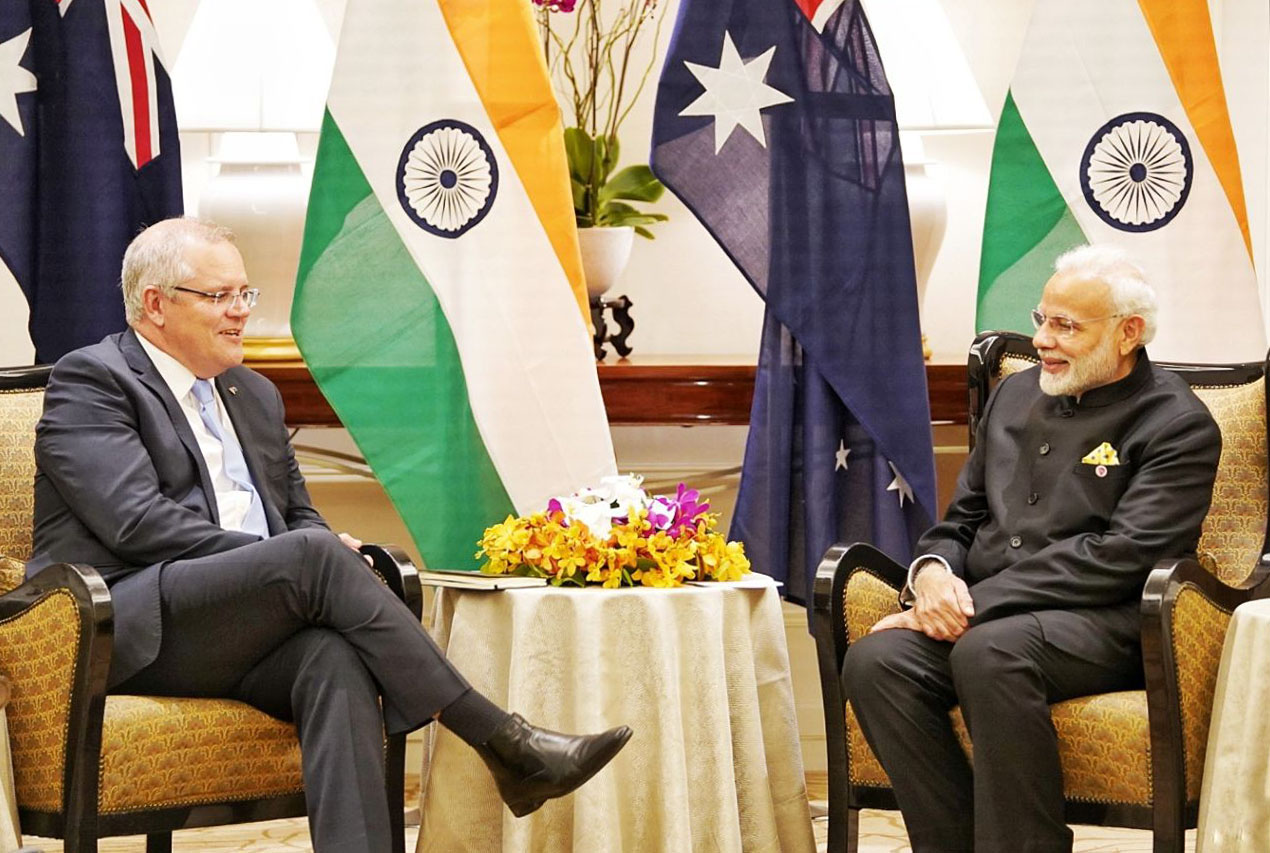
Australian Prime Minister Scott Morrison (left) and Indian Prime Minister Narendra Modi meeting on the sidelines of the East Asia Summit in Singapore; November 2018.

The Australia-India Comprehensive Economic Cooperation Agreement (AI-CECA) is a bilateral agreement between Australia and India. The two nations launched negotiations for a Comprehensive Economic Cooperation Agreement in May 2011. In September 2021, Australia and India formally re-launched CECA negotiations with the intention of quickly concluding an Economic Cooperation and Trade Agreement (ECTA) to swiftly liberalise and deepen bilateral trade in goods and services, and to then use this foundation to resume negotiations on the more ambitious CECA. On 2 April 2022, an interim agreement was signed by Ministers Dan Tehan, representing the Morrison government of Australia, and Piyush Goyal, representing the Modi Government of India.

The agreement cuts tariffs on a range of Australian exports to India, including coal, lentils, sheep meat and wool, lobsters and rare earths. It also promises a phased reduction of tariffs on wine and other agricultural products, including avocados, cherries, nuts, blueberries, almonds, oranges, mandarins, pears and strawberries. "We are opening the biggest door of one of the biggest economies in the world in India," Prime Minister Scott Morrison said ahead of the signing. Minister Tehan predicted the agreement would lead to a doubling of trade in coming years. "India and Australia are natural partners. Like two brothers, both nations supported each other during the COVID-19 pandemic. Our relationship rests on the pillars of trust and reliability", Minister Goyal said.

== See also ==
- Australia–India relations
