= Indonesia–Australia Comprehensive Economic Partnership Agreement =

Indonesia-Australia Economic Partnership Agreement

Indonesia-Australia Comprehensive Economic Partnership Agreement (IA-CEPA) (English); Persetujuan Kemitraan Ekonomi Komprehensif Indonesia-Australia (IA-CEPA) (Indonesian)
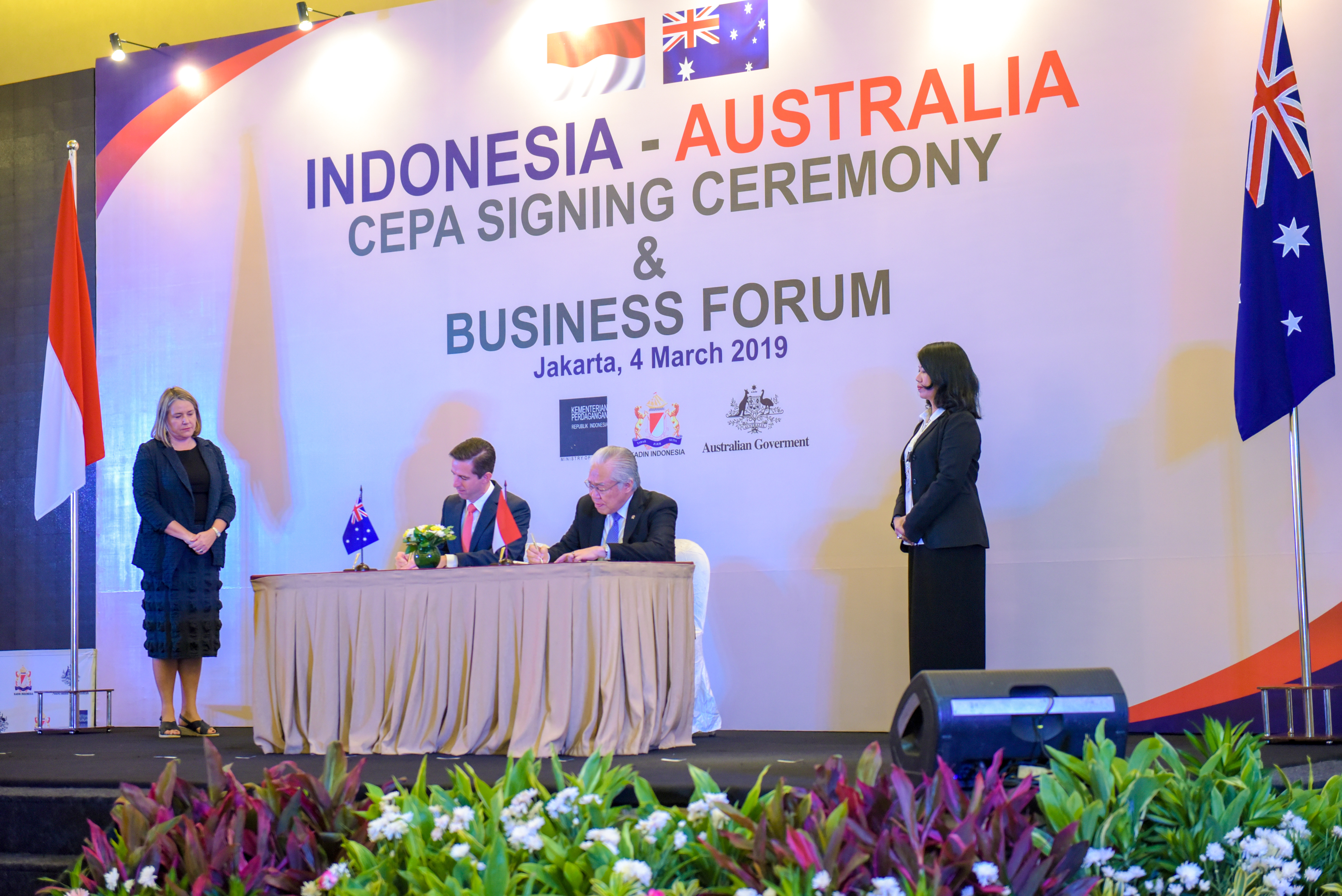
- Australian trade minister Birmingham and Indonesian trade minister Lukita formally signing IA-CEPA in March 2019
- Type: Free trade agreement
- Signed: 4 March 2019
- Location: Jakarta, Indonesia
- Ratified: 26 November 2019; 28 February 2020
- Effective: 5 July 2020
- Original signatories: Simon Birmingham (Minister for Trade and Tourism); Enggartiasto Lukita (Minister of Trade)
- Ratifiers: Australia; Indonesia
- Languages: English; Indonesian

Customs Amendment (Growing Australian Export Opportunities Across the Asia-Pacific) Act 2019

Parliament of Australia
- Long title: An Act to amend the Customs Act 1901, and for related purposes
- Citation: No. 108, 2019
- Passed by: House of Representatives
- Passed: 21 October 2019
- Passed by: Senate
- Passed: 26 November 2019
- Royal assent: 3 December 2019
- Status: In force

IA-CEPA Ratification Act Undang-Undang Pengesahan IA-CEPA

People's Representative Council
- Long title: Undang-Undang Republik Indonesia Nomor 1 Tahun 2020 Tentang Pengesahan Persetujuan Kemitraan Ekonomi Komprehensif Indonesia-Australia ("Indonesia-Australia Comprehensive Economic Partnership Agreement") ("Act No. 1/2020 on the Ratification of the Indonesia-Australia Comprehensive Economic Partnership Agreement")
- Citation: No. 1, 2020
- Passed by: People's Representative Council
- Passed: 6 February 2020
- Signed by: President Joko Widodo
- Signed: 28 February 2020
- Status: In force

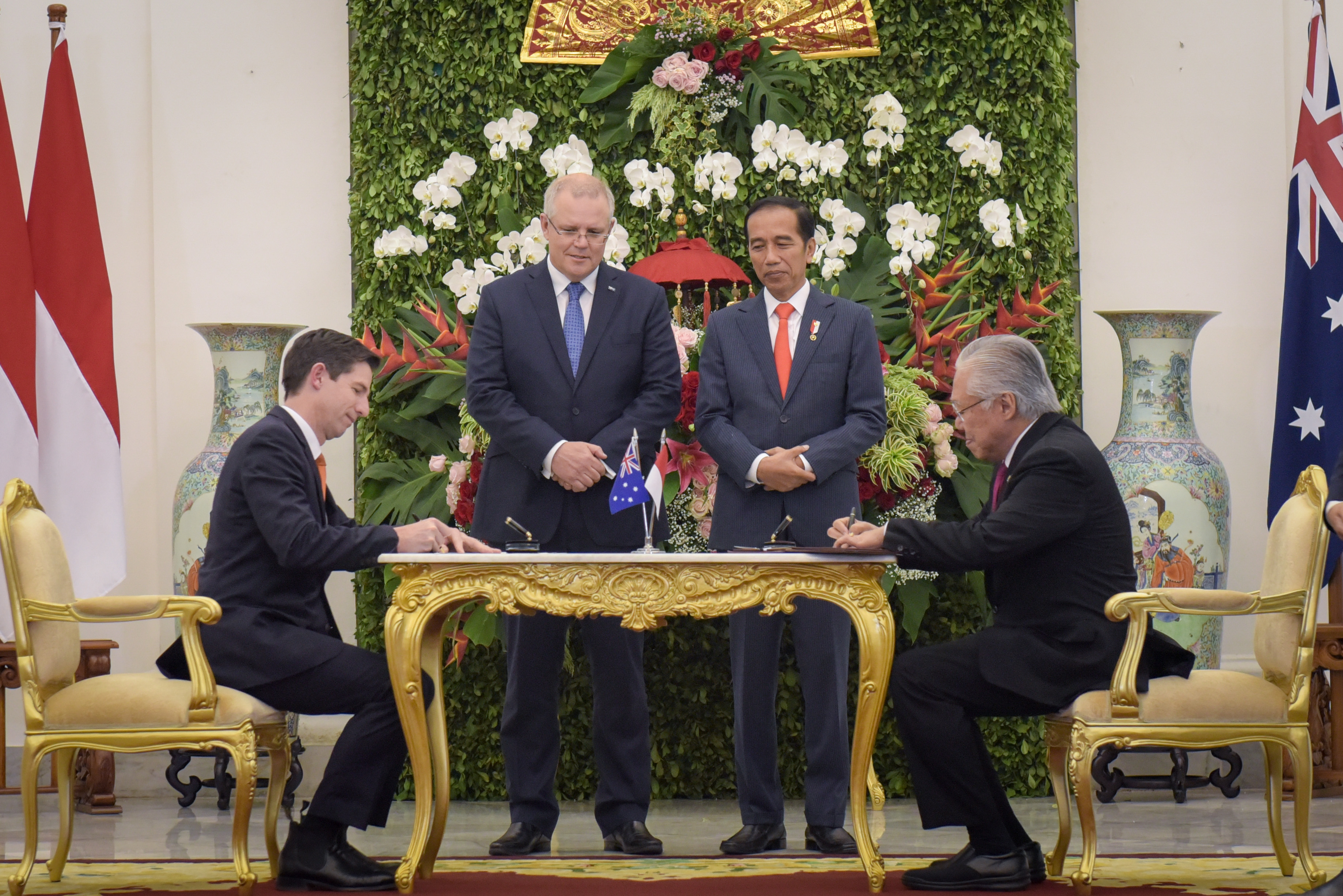
Trade ministers Simon Birmingham and Enggartiasto Lukita sign a memorandum of understanding in Jakarta in August 2018, as Prime Minister Scott Morrison and President Joko Widodo look on.

The Indonesia–Australia Comprehensive Economic Partnership Agreement (IA-CEPA; Indonesian: Perjanjian Kemitraan Ekonomi Komprehensif Indonesia–Australia) is a bilateral agreement signed between Australia and Indonesia in March 2019, ratified by Australia in November 2019 and Indonesia in February 2020. The agreement contains a free trade agreement removing tariffs from nearly all products traded between both countries, in addition to loosening investment regulations in Indonesia for Australian firms and increasing the quota for Indonesians seeking vocational training in Australia.

== Agreements ==
IA-CEPA contains clauses on bilateral free trade, investments, skills training visas, investor arbitration, e-commerce, and intellectual property protection. Indonesia, under the agreement, will remove tariffs from nearly all Australian products exported to Indonesia while all Indonesian products exported to Australia will be free of tariffs. Australian firms would be permitted to hold a majority stake in Indonesian telecommunications, transport, health and energy firms. Additionally, the number of work holiday visas issued to Indonesians annually would be increased from 1,000 to 4,100 (later to 5,000 by 2026), and Australian universities would be permitted to open Indonesian campuses.

The deal also includes protections against discrimination and expropriations and prevents software developers from being forced to hand over their source code to sell their products. Additionally, Australian businesses were granted exceptions to an Indonesian regulation requiring online marketplaces in Indonesia to store data locally.

== History ==
Bilateral trade negotiations began between the two countries in November 2010, with the IA-CEPA itself being announced in a joint statement, during the presidency of Susilo Bambang Yudhoyono and the prime ministership of Julia Gillard. After several conferences and meetings throughout 2011, another joint communiqué was released following a meeting in Darwin on 3 July 2012 calling for the launch of the deal's negotiations before the end of that year. Afterwards, however, relations between the two countries soured (due to 2013 Australian spying scandal and the 2015 Indonesian execution of Australian citizens), and in 2015 Indonesia implemented tariffs on Australian cattle imports. Eventually Indonesian Trade Minister Thomas Lembong and his Australian counterpart Steven Ciobo announced a resumption of negotiations in March 2016. Prior to the resumption of talks, four rounds of negotiations had been held.

By February 2017, six rounds of negotiations had been held between the two countries, and both Australian PM Malcolm Turnbull and Indonesian President Joko Widodo (Jokowi) committed to wrapping up the discussions by the end of that year in March 2017. Continued negotiations throughout the year failed to complete the deal by the end of 2017, which by November had totalled ten rounds. In March 2018, Indonesian Foreign Minister Retno Marsudi admitted that negotiators were still attempting to resolve some issues and moved the deadline to the end of 2018. Indonesian Trade Minister Enggartiasto Lukita further aimed to sign the agreement by November 2018 in April.

During new Australian prime minister Scott Morrison's first foreign visit in his tenure to Jakarta, he and Jokowi announced an agreement regarding IA-CEPA on 31 August 2018. The signing was however delayed due to a bilateral spat over Australia's recognition of West Jerusalem as Israel's capital, which drew diplomatic protests from Indonesia. The agreement was finally signed by Lukita and Australian Trade Minister Simon Birmingham in March 2019, subject to ratification by the Parliament of Australia and Indonesia's People's Representative Council.

Australia's parliament ratified the agreement as part of the Customs Amendment Bill 2019 (alongside CEPAs with Peru, Hong Kong and China) on 26 November 2019 and the bill received royal assent on 3 December 2019. The People's Representative Council ratified the agreement on 6 February 2020 during a plenary session. It came into force on 5 July 2020.

== Reactions ==
Shortly after Indonesia's ratification of the agreement, Australia's Monash University revealed plans to open a campus in Indonesia, becoming the first foreign university to do so in Indonesia. Indonesian economic observers remarked that the free trade agreement may lead to increased imports of agricultural products, primarily Australian beef, which may displace the local cattle industry. The Australian Labor Party has also questioned the treaty's clauses on investor-state disputes and on temporary Indonesian work in Australia.
