= 2018–19 Australian bushfire season =

Fire season in Australia

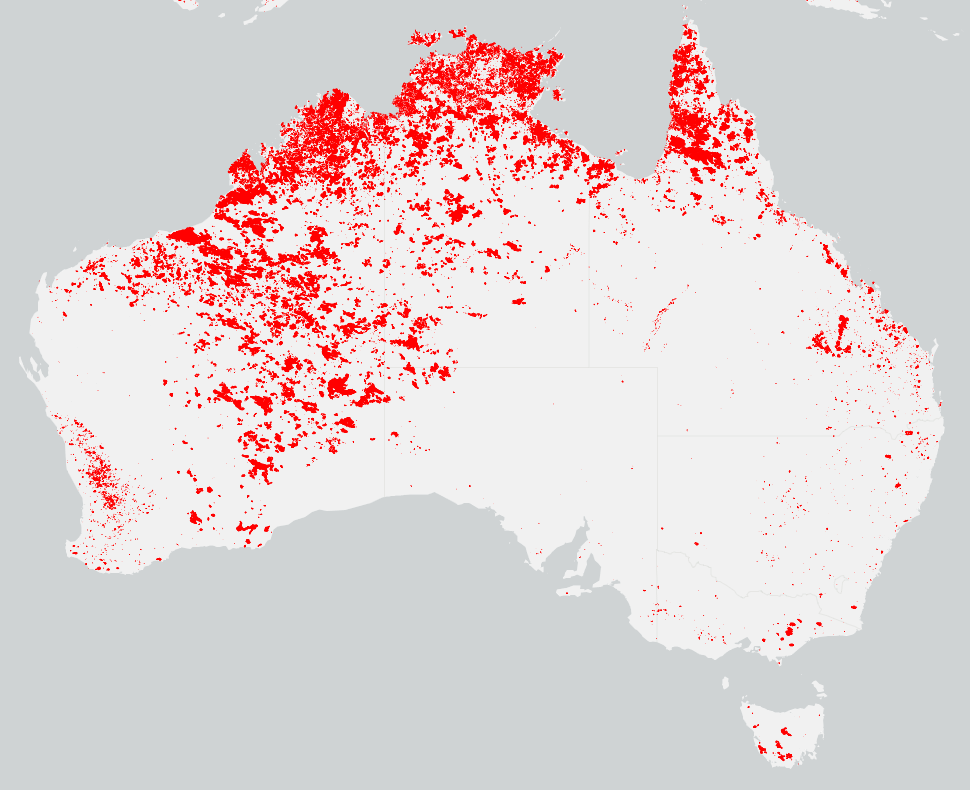
- NASA MODIS burned area detections from June 2018 to May 2019
- Date: June 2018 – June 2019
- Location: Australia

Ignition
- Cause: Heat, drought, El Niño

A series of bushfires occurring from June 2018 to June 2019 were predicted to be "fairly bleak" in parts of Australia, particularly in the east, by the Bushfire and Natural Hazards Cooperative Research Centre (CRC) chief executive, Richard Thornton, in September 2018. Large bushfires had already burned through southern New South Wales during winter. The outlook for spring was of a higher likelihood of fires with a twice the normal chance of an El Nino for summer. Many parts of eastern Australia including Queensland, New South Wales and Gippsland, in Victoria, were already in drought. Above normal fire was also predicted for large parts of Southern Australia and Eastern Australia by the Bushfire and Natural Hazards CRC. The forecast noted that Queensland had recorded the ninth driest and fourth hottest period on record from April to November. New South Wales recorded the fourth hottest period and eighth driest on record, while Victoria experiences the 13th driest and seventh hottest period on record. Authorities in New South Wales brought forward the start of the bushfire season for much of the state from October 2018 to the beginning of August 2018.

== Fires by state or territory ==
=== New South Wales ===
July 2018

New South Wales experienced 525 fires in the last week of July, more than twice the number from the previous year.

August 2018

On 15 August, a bushfire near Bega burned out 2,300 ha (5,700 acres) of inaccessible bushland and threatened properties. Another fire in Budawang National Park, near Ulladulla, blackened 1,516 ha (3,750 acres) and a third fire near Nowra destroyed outbuildings and forced residents to evacuate. A firefighter named Alan Tully died on 17 August when his helicopter crashed while combating fires near Ulladulla. A fire started near Salt Ash, north of Newcastle, on 18 August and two days later had burnt out 2,000 ha (4,900 acres), on 20 August 70 fires were burning around the state.

=== Victoria ===
December 2018

On 7 December a grassfire threatened the tiny town of Little River which is south west from Melbourne. The fire started at 11:42am and burnt at least 1,240 hectares.

March 2019

On 1 March several fires were lit in the east of the state as the result of a band of dry lightning. A bushfire in the Bunyip State Park destroyed 29 houses as well as 67 outbuildings and sheds over the following two days.

=== Queensland ===
November 2018

By 30 November, 144 bushfires were burning throughout Queensland at the end of a week where 200 fires had been battled by firefighters. High temperatures and strong winds made for difficult conditions and two houses, two cabins and 15 sheds were lost to fire with a further 14 houses damaged.

=== Tasmania ===
January 2019

A series of bushfires started in Tasmania from late December as a result of lightning strikes.

This included The Gell River fire, Great Pine Tier fire and Riveaux Road fire which burned through a combined than 278,000 hectares of the Southwest National Park from December 2018 to March 2019, occasionally through vegetation that was not fire resistant and will not regenerate.

Four houses and several outbuildings were lost during the fires, including Churchill's Hut, built in the 1920s by Elias Churchill.

=== Western Australia ===
October 2018

A bushfire, that started on 11 October, approximately 120 km (75 mi) south east of Broome burned through an area of 880,000 ha (2,200,000 acres). Adverse conditions, the remote location and a lack of water meant that the fire was fought using back-burning, constructing fire lines and using aircraft.

January 2019

In mid-January, south western Australia experienced a major heatwave that triggered a large fire in Collie on 21 January, putting most of Collie at risk. The fire was extinguished the next day. About 160 ha (400 acres) was burnt out and four firefighters were hospitalised.

February 2019

On 7 February, a large bushfire started in the Forrestdale Lake nature reserve in Forrestdale that put the suburbs of Forrestdale, Harrisdale and Piara Waters under an emergency warning. Over 144 ha (360 acres) was burned out with many vehicles and one home being destroyed.

== See also ==
- List of Australian bushfire seasons
