= Commander of the Papua New Guinea Defence Force =

- Emblem of the Defence Force

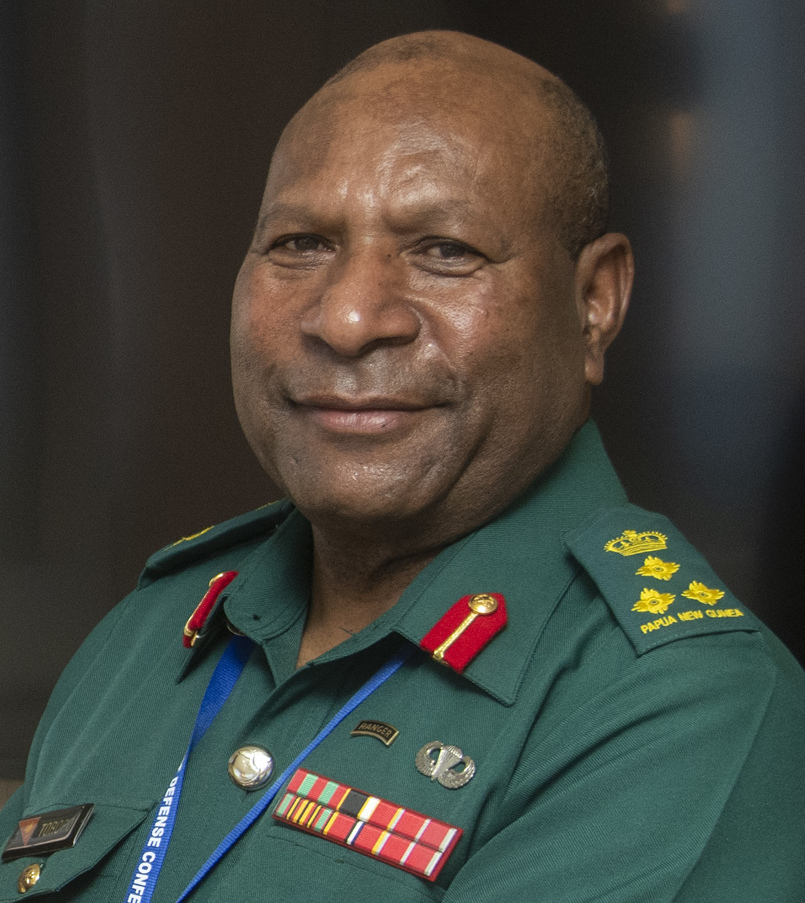
- Incumbent; Major General Gilbert Toropo since 31 January 2014
- Ministry of Defence
- Status: Active
- Member of: Papua New Guinea Defence Force
- Reports to: The Honourable Fabian Pok, Minister of Defence
- Appointer: Governor-General of Papua New Guinea
- Formation: 1975
- First holder: Ted Diro

The Commander of the Papua New Guinea Defence Force is the highest-ranking military officer of in the Papua New Guinea Defence Force, who is responsible for maintaining the operational command of the military. The current commander is Brigadier general Gilbert Toropo.

== List of Commanders ==
No.	Portrait	Commander	Took office	Left office	Time in office	Ref.
1	Ted Diro	Brigadier general Ted Diro (born 1943)	1975	1981	5–6 years	
2	Gago Mamae	Brigadier general Gago Mamae	1981	1983	1–2 years	
3	Ken Noga	Brigadier general Ken Noga (?–2014)	1983	1985	1–2 years	
4	Tony Huai	Brigadier general Tony Huai	1985	1987	1–2 years	
5	Rochus Lokinap	Brigadier general Rochus Lokinap	1987	November 1992	4–5 years	
6	Robert Dademo	Brigadier general Robert Dademo	November 1992	?	?	
(4)	Tony Huai	Brigadier general Tony Huai	?	1995	?	
7	Jerry Singirok	Brigadier general Jerry Singirok (born 1956)	1995	17 March 1997	1–2 years	
-	Alfred Aikung	Colonel; Alfred Aikung; Acting	17 March 1997	1997	0 years	
8	Leo Nuia	Brigadier general Leo Nuia	1997	1998	0–1 years	
(7)	Jerry Singirok	Brigadier general Jerry Singirok (born 1956)	1998	1999	0–1 years	
9	Carl Malpo	Brigadier general Carl Malpo (?–2009)	1999	?	?	
10	Peter Ilau	Commodore; Peter Ilau (born 1959)	2001	2009	8	
-	Francis Agwi	Brigadier general Francis Agwi (born 1963); Acting	2010	2010	0 years	
11	Francis Agwi	Brigadier general Francis Agwi (born 1963)	2010	December 2013	2–3 years	
12	Gilbert Toropo	Major General; Gilbert Toropo	31 January 2014	Incumbent	12 years	

== See also ==
- Papua New Guinea Defence Force
