= Agwi =

Agwi may refer to:

== Organizations ==
- Agwilines Inc, a passenger and cargo shipping company

== People ==
- Francis Agwi, Papua New Guinean Army officer
- Michael Agwi (born 2003), Irish tennis player

== Food ==
- Agwi-jjim, a Korean dish
