= 2012 Papua New Guinea Defence Force mutiny =

- Part of 2011–2012 Papua New Guinean constitutional crisis
Date	26 January 2012
Location	Port Moresby, Papua New Guinea
Result	Mutiny ended: Francis Agwi freed; Yaura Sasa arrested and charged with mutiny

Belligerents
Papua New Guinea Defence Force	Papua New Guinea Defence Force (rebel faction)

Commanders and leaders
(Papua New Guinea) Michael Ogio (Papua New Guinea) Peter O'Neill (Papua New Guinea) Francis Agwi	(Papua New Guinea) Yaura Sasa

Strength
unknown	20-30

The 2012 Papua New Guinea Defence Force mutiny took place on 26 January 2012 when a group of military personnel headed by retired Colonel Yaura Sasa took the commander of the defence force, Brigadier General Francis Agwi, prisoner. The mutiny was related to a dispute over the prime ministership between Sir Michael Somare and Peter O'Neill which had begun in December 2011 when the Supreme Court of Papua New Guinea ordered that Somare be reinstated as the prime minister while the country's parliament supported O'Neill.

Following the crisis in December, Somare directed Governor-General Sir Michael Ogio to appoint Sasa as the commander of the Papua New Guinea Defence Force (PNGDF). After forces under Sasa's command captured Agwi on 26 January, the colonel called upon the Governor-General to reinstate Somare as the country's leader and threatened to take further action if this did not occur. The mutiny ended later that day, with Agwi being freed. Sasa was arrested and charged with mutiny on 28 January.

== Prelude ==
In August 2011 Peter O'Neill became the Prime Minister of Papua New Guinea (PNG). At this time Sir Michael Somare was recovering from sickness, and his family had announced that he had resigned from both the Prime Ministership and parliament. In December 2011 the Supreme Court of Papua New Guinea ruled that Somare's removal from office was unlawful, and directed that he be reinstated. This led to a political standoff, during which Somare asked the commander of the PNGDF, Brigadier General Francis Agwi, to intervene. Agwi refused to do so, and endorsed O'Neill. O'Neill was supported by most members of Parliament, and retained the position.

At some point following these events, Somare and his cabinet took the decision to replace Agwi with the retired PNGDF officer Colonel Yaura Sasa. Sasa had served as the defence attache in Papua New Guinea's embassy in Indonesia before retiring from the military.

== Mutiny ==
At 3:00 am on 26 January about 20 soldiers from the 1st Battalion, Royal Pacific Islands Regiment (1 RPIR) took Agwi and two other officers deemed to be loyal to O'Neill prisoner after overpowering guards at Taurama Barracks outside of PNG's capital of Port Moresby. Several shots were fired during this operation. The party then transported Agwi to Murray Barracks near the centre of the city where he was placed under house arrest.

At a press conference held on 26 January, Sasa claimed that his actions were not a coup or mutiny as he had been appointed to lead the PNGDF by Somare. He called upon Governor General Sir Michael Ogio to reinstate Somare. He also stated that "I once again am now calling on... both parties and the head of state to respect the constitution and comply with the orders issued by the supreme court immediately" and "If this call is not heeded, I may be forced to take necessary actions".

PNG's Deputy Prime Minister and Minister for Defence Belden Namah stated in separate press conference that Sasa was not supported by most of the PNGDF, and that 15 of his supporters had been arrested. At this time the total number of military personnel supporting the colonel was stated to be about 30. Namah claimed that Sasa's actions constituted treason and called upon him to surrender. In response to reports that Somare had ordered the mutiny, Namah stated that Somare had "lost sanity".

In a statement issued via his daughter on 26 January, Somare defended his decision to order the mutiny. He argued that the mutiny was legitimate as O'Neill and his supporters were "illegally holding on to power". He also stated that "We cannot allow this situation to continue where a rogue government commandeers the disciplinary forces" and "It is incumbent on the police and army to comply with the orders of the supreme court and support the legitimate government, which is the minority Somare/Agiru government".

In the evening of 26 January O'Neill told the media that the mutiny had ended. He stated that Agwi had been freed and Sasa was being "dealt with". The soldiers who supported Sasa had withdrawn to Taurama Barracks.

Many businesses in Port Moresby closed on 26 January in response to the mutiny. An Australian Broadcasting Corporation reporter in the city stated that the atmosphere there was "tense". All domestic flights in PNG were also cancelled in an apparent attempt to prevent other soldiers travelling to Port Moresby. The Australian Department of Foreign Affairs and Trade issued a statement warning Australians to "limit travel around Port Moresby". New Zealand's Ministry of Foreign Affairs and Trade issued a similar warning.

== Aftermath ==
The mutineers at Taurama Barracks were still armed on 27 January, and had announced that they would retain their weapons until they received a pardon. At this time, Sasa was reported to be in the barracks' officers mess. A spokesman for the Royal Papua New Guinea Constabulary was reported to have said that the force did not intend to arrest Sasa, as his conduct was a matter for the military. Sasa was also reported to be seeking a pardon. Due to the intensification of the political crisis following the mutiny, the PNG Government's credit rating was downgraded from stable to negative by ratings agency Standard & Poor's.

Sasa was arrested by police officers on the night of 28 January and charged with mutiny. At this time he was staying in a house in the suburb of Boroko. On 29 January Somare issued a statement in which he called upon police and the PNGDF to support the supreme court ruling in relation to the prime ministership.

On 30 January, the soldiers who participated in the mutiny surrendered their weapons to Namah following a parade at Taurama Barracks. The Defence Minister gave a speech to about 200 members of 1 RPIR, including the 30 mutineers, during which he stated that the soldiers who had taken party in the mutiny would receive an amnesty later that afternoon. He threatened that personnel who participated in any further mutinies would "face the full brunt of the law", however. Sasa was released on bail on 1 February. The charge against Sasa was struck out by the Committal Court on 1 August 2012 on the grounds that police prosecutors had not submitted any evidence to substantiate it.

The mutiny on 26 January was the second military mutiny to have taken place in PNG. The first occurred on 28 July 1997 when the PNGDF's Special Forces Unit occupied Murray Barracks.
