= Rochus Lokinap =

Papua New Guinea military officer

Rochus Lokinap, CBE
- Born: New Ireland
- Occupation: military officer
- Known for: helped thwart a coup attempt in 1990

Rochus Lokinap, CBE was a military officer in Papua New Guinea. He held the rank of brigadier general in the Papua New Guinea Defence Forces (PNGDF) and was the PNG Defence Commander, in March 1990 when Police Commissioner Paul Tobian tried to execute a coup against government of Sir Rabbie Namaliu. According to the Canberra Times Lokinap and Ted Diro, then Minister of State Security, rallied forces to thwart the coup.

In April 1991 critics scrutinized actions of the PNGDF on Bougainville Island, during a civil uprising. Reporters sought to interview Lokinap, senior officer of the PNGDF, and he could not be found. According to Australia's Parliamentary Research Service Lokinap regarded Colonel Lima Dataona, the on-site commander in Bougainville, as a rival, and successful in arranging his replacement by his own candidate, Colonel Leo Niua.

Lokinap graduated from the Military Cadet School in Lae in 1970. From there he attended the Portsea Officer Cadet School in 1971. Lokinap was appointed commander of the PNGDF in December 1987, holding that position until 1992. He was the first senior officer who was not from Papua, being from New Ireland. He was made a Commander of the Order of the British Empire on June 11, 1988.

HMPNGS Rochus Lokinap will be named in his honour. It will be the PNGDF's second Guardian-class patrol vessel, joining sister ship HMPNGS Ted Diro. She is expected to be commissioned in late 2020 or early 2021.
