= Jerry Singirok =

Papua New Guinea commander (born 1956)

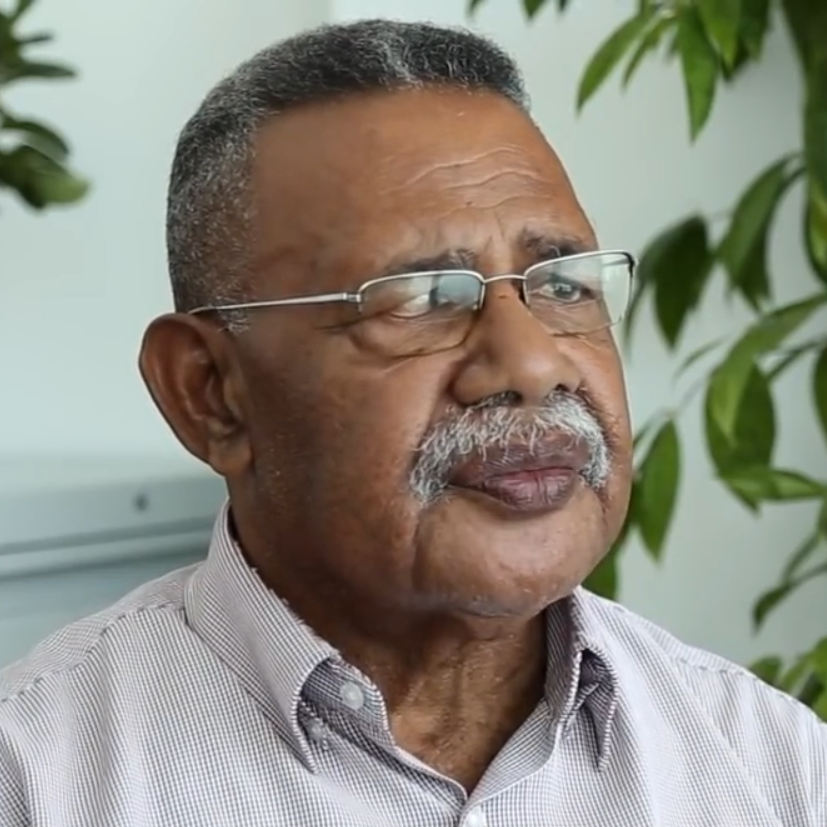
Singirok in 2017

Jerry Singirok (born 5 May 1956) was the commander of the Papua New Guinea Defence Force throughout the Sandline affair of 1997.

== Military career ==
Jerry Singirok was a career soldier who had risen through the ranks of the Papua New guinea Defense Force (PNGDF), including a time as commander of the forces on Bougainville. He began his Career at Moem Barracks in the East Sepik Province of Papua New Guinea (PNG) as an Infantryman on The 1st Royal Pacific Islands Regiment (1RPIR). After military service there he was rotated to Lae, Morobe, Igam Barracks Joint Officer Service College where he trained as a commissioned officer. Singirok trained and lectured in Duntroon military academy in Australia on Land Warfare Tactics in Military Science before being requested back to the PNGDF on strict orders during the height of the Sandline Crisis with the rank of captain. In the mid-1990s, he was promoted to Brigadier-General, and given the rank of commander. He was later promoted to the rank of Major-General of the PNGDF in the late 1990s during his second stint as commander.

In 1996, Tim Spicer, an ex-Colonel in the Scots Guards, who had recently founded the mercenary firm Sandline International, met with Singirok. Spicer attempted to persuade Singirok to support a package of military support that Spicer had negotiated with then-defence minister Mathias Ijape. Singirok declined, but the deal went ahead anyway, with the support of Ijape, Prime Minister Sir Julius Chan and Deputy Prime Minister Chris Haiveta.

It is unclear just how much Singirok knew of the events in between that meeting and the leaking of the affair to the international media on 10 February 1997. When the story broke in The Australian newspaper, Singirok was in the Philippines, and the mercenaries were already in Port Moresby. When he returned on 27 February, his mind was made up. He condemned the government for leaving him, as head of the PNGDF, out of the loop, and condemned Spicer for having more access to the government than he did. Over the next week, he made plans for Operation Rausim Kwik (Tok Pisin for 'get rid of them fast'). On 8 March, he asked Major Walter Enuma to command the operation. Enuma agreed.

== Sandline affair ==
On the night of 16 March, Singirok's soldiers swooped. They arrested Spicer, the mercenaries, and their support staff. The next morning, Singirok went on national radio, and accused Prime Minister Chan, Defence Minister Ijape, and Deputy Prime Minister Haiveta of corruption, and gave them 48 hours to resign. He also fiercely denied allegations that he was aiming to take power himself. Chan refused to resign, and the same day, sacked Singirok as Commander of the PNGDF, replacing him with the controversial Colonel Alfred Aikung.

That was the end of Singirok's direct role in the crisis that followed. However, Enuma carried out Singirok's plans in his absence. In the days that followed, the mercenaries were deported, the parliament was surrounded, and Chan, Ijape and Haiveta were all forced to stand down.

Following Sir Julius Chan's decision to stand down, Singirok went public with several serious corruption allegations against Chan's government. Chan stood again at the following election, but in the wake of the affair and Singirok's allegations, not only lost power, but also his seat in parliament.

== Dismissal and subsequent inquiry ==
Following the affair, Singirok was dismissed from his position. He faced several inquiries into the events. He was subsequently reappointed in 1998, but dismissed again in 2000 over the same events, after another inquiry.

The 2000 inquiry found Singirok guilty of secretly receiving $US52,000 through his Visa card account in the London-based Lloyds Bank. He was also found guilty of failing to obtain an exemption from the Ombudsman Commission for the payments he received.

Singirok also faced criminal sedition charges, stemming from his radio broadcast of 17 March 1997, stating that he had launched a military revolt to get the mercenaries out of the country. Finally, in March 2004, he was cleared of all other charges.

In recent times, he has spoken out against Australian intervention in the Pacific, particularly the deployment of forces to the Solomon Islands, accusing the country of imperialism. He has also suggested that Papua New Guinea risks becoming a failed state.

== Legacy ==
Though his name has been sullied somewhat by the bribery allegations, many still credit Singirok with the end of the Bougainvillean war, which occurred soon after the ousting of the Chan government. In a June 2004 interview with the Port Moresby newspaper The National, he stated "Even to this day, I believe strongly as a professional military officer that there was no military solution to bring an end to the civil war on Bougainville."

Singirok now operates a taxi company & security firm in Port Moresby. He has suggested that after taking a break, he may return to public life.

He stood unsuccessfully for Parliament in the 2007 general election, in the Sumkar constituency in Madang Province, where he was defeated by Ken Fairweather.

Military offices
Preceded by Tony Huai	Commander of the Papua New Guinea Defence Force; 1995–1997	Succeeded by Alfred Aikung (acting)
Preceded by Leo Nuia	Commander of the Papua New Guinea Defence Force; 1998–1999	Succeeded by Karl Malpo
