= Leo Nuia =

- Occupation: military officer
- Known for: was his country's senior military officer
- Military career
- Allegiance: Papua New Guinea
- Branch: Papua New Guinea Defence Force
- Service years: 1991-
- Rank: Colonel

Leo Nuia was an officer in the Papua New Guinea Defence Force.

In 1991, when he was a Colonel, he replaced Colonel Lima Dataona as local commander on Bougainville Island, during a civil uprising. Security Challenges described him as a "hardliner". It said he led an unauthorized landing on Bougainville, which was counter to an interim ceasefire Papua New Guinea's civilian leadership had negotiated with Bougainville rebel forces, and disrupted their attempts to reach a lasting Peace Agreement. Nuia was suspended after he publicly criticized the Minister of Defence.

The final result of the conflict was that the rebels earned Bougainville Island the status of an autonomous region, within Papua New Guinea.

In 1997, Nuia served as Commander of the Papua New Guinea Defence Force.
