= Yaura Sasa =

Papua New Guinean retired army colonel

Yaura Sasa is a Papua New Guinean retired army colonel who led the failed 2012 Defence Force mutiny on 26 January 2012. Sasa and approximately 20 PNG soldiers seized control of the main administrative compound in the Defence Force Headquarters, Murray Barracks located within the capital Port Moresby. The group, led by Sasa, also briefly captured the commander of the Papua New Guinea Defence Force, Brigadier General Francis Agwi and placed him under house arrest along with other higher-ranking officers.

The mutiny was related to a dispute over the prime ministership between Sir Michael Somare and Peter O'Neill which had begun in December 2011 when the Supreme Court of Papua New Guinea ordered that Somare be reinstated as the prime minister while the country's National Parliament supported O'Neill. Sasa led the mutiny with the goal of reinstating Sir Michael Somare as prime minister.

Sasa was arrested and charged with mutiny on 28 January 2012. He was located in a Port Moresby suburb, and was reportedly taken into custody at a police station voluntarily. The charge against Sasa was struck out by the Committal Court on 1 August 2012 on the grounds that police prosecutors had not submitted any evidence to substantiate it.
