= Gilbert Toropo =

Papua New Guinean military general

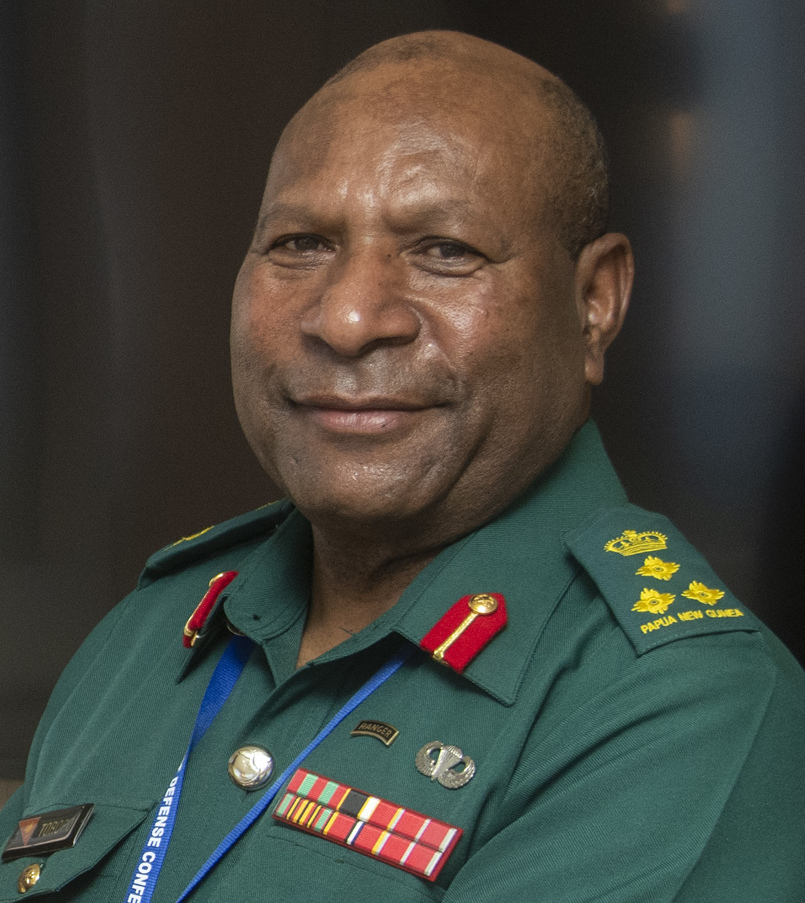
Gilbert Toropo

Major General Gilbert Toropo CBE is a Papua New Guinean Army officer who is the current Commander of the Papua New Guinea Defence Force (PNGDF).

Toropo was born in the Southern Highlands Province. During his career in the PNGDF's Land Element, he commanded the 1st Battalion of the Royal Pacific Islands Regiment as well as the PNGDF's joint task force, and was promoted to the rank of colonel in 2012. During 2007 he undertook a year-long training course at the Australian Defence Force's Centre for Defence and Strategic Studies in Canberra.

Toropo was announced as the commander of the PNGDF on 9 January 2014, replacing Brigadier General Francis Agwi who had reached the end of his period in the office. At the time he was 51 years of age. Toropo was sworn into his new role on 31 January 2014.

Already a Member of the Order of the British Empire (MBE), Toropo was appointed Commander of the Order of the British Empire (CBE) in the 2014 Birthday Honours.

In February 2020, the Australian Broadcasting Corporation reported that the Royal Papua New Guinea Constabulary was seeking to interview Toropo in relation to allegations of corruption. Toropo denied the accusations, and has stated that he is willing to be interviewed.

Military offices
Preceded by Francis Agwi	Commander of the Papua New Guinea Defence Force; 2014–present	Incumbent
