= Aga Khan affair =

Canadian political scandal

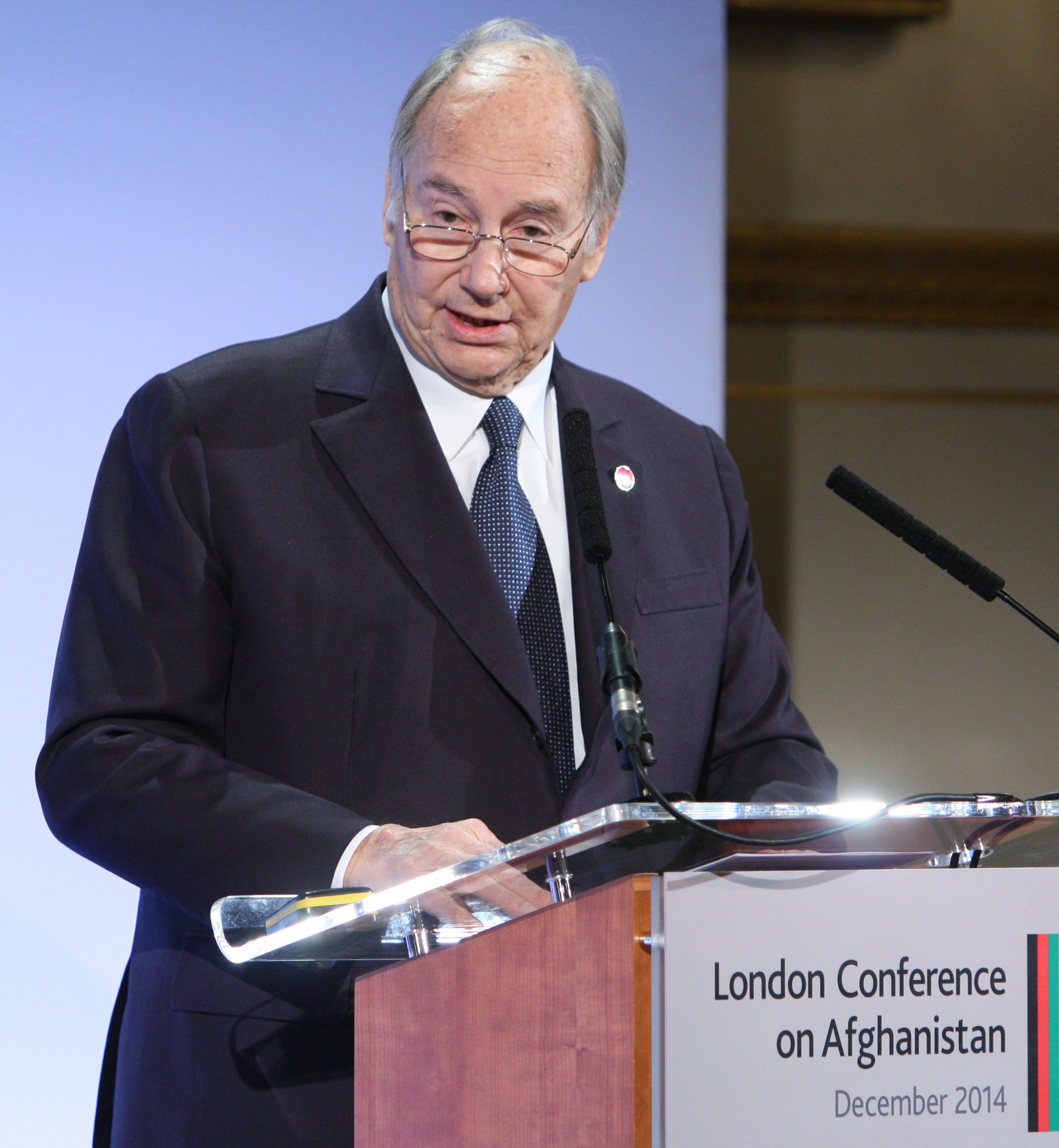
Aga Khan

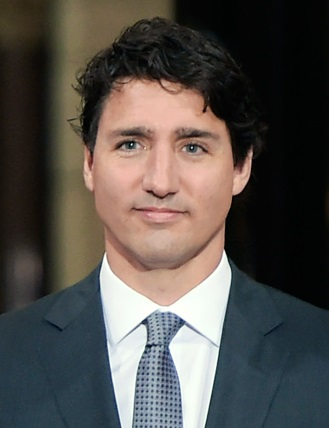
Justin Trudeau

The Aga Khan affair was a political scandal in Canada involving Prime Minister Justin Trudeau. In 2017, Trudeau was found to have violated sections 5,11,12, and 21[1] of the Federal Conflict of Interest Act by accepting private-island vacations, gifts, and flights from Aga Khan (Karim al-Husseini), a philanthropist and spiritual leader of the Shia Ismaili religion. This was deemed significant as the Aga Khan Foundation, a registered lobby, had received over $50 million of federal funding in 2016.

Justin Trudeau adopted the position that he and Karim al-Husseini were close friends, and the trips were of a personal nature. This was ostensibly supported by a close relationship between Trudeau’s father, Pierre Elliott Trudeau, and Karim al-Husseini. Furthermore in 1983, when Justin Trudeau was twelve years old, their two families had undertaken a vacation together to Greece.

Then-Ethics Commissioner Mary Dawson stated in her ruling however that Justin Trudeau and Karim al-Husseini had undertaken no serious social interactions for thirty years outside a single instance at the funeral of Pierre Elliot Trudeau; and that, “there were no private interactions between Mr. Trudeau and the Aga Khan until Mr. Trudeau became Leader of the Liberal Party of Canada. This led me to conclude that their relationship cannot be described as one of friends for the purposes of the Act.”

== December 2016 vacation ==
On December 26, 2016 Justin Trudeau and his family left Canada to travel to Karim al-Husseini’s private residence at Bell Cay, The Bahamas, via Nassau. Over the course of the trip Trudeau would travel to and from various locations via al-Husseini’s personal helicopters.

During his stay on Bell Cay, Trudeau met with al-Husseini, as well as then-United States Secretary of State John Kerry who was also visiting the island at the time. This meeting was entirely coincidental and not unusual as in the six months prior, Bell Cay had entertained 178 guests. Trudeau stated that although all interactions were of a purely social nature, the topic of the US administration did come up.

The vacation lasted until January 4, 2017: eight days in total. It was later disclosed that government expenditures for the trip had amounted to CA$215,000.

This was later followed by the Aga Khan Foundation receiving an amount of $50 million in funding and donations from the Liberal government of Canada.

== Investigation ==
The federal government did not disclose existence of the trip to the public. Shortly after Trudeau's return to Canada, however, details about the trip were reported by the media. These were confirmed in a statement released by the Prime Minister’s Office on January 6, 2017. This began calls for an investigation into the matter by the Official Opposition who filed formal complaints on January 8 and 11 to the Office of the Conflict of Interest and Ethics Commissioner.

On January 14, 2017 then-Ethics Commissioner Mary Dawson officially opened an investigation into the matter. As a result of the investigation, two more trips taken by Trudeau’s family to Bell Cay, in March and December 2014 were retroactively disclosed; these were taken into consideration in the final report.

On December 20, 2017 Mary Dawson released her final report entitled “The Trudeau Report”.

== The Trudeau Report ==
The final report released by the Office of the Conflict of Interest and Ethics Commissioner exonerated Karim al-Husseini of all involvement as he was found to be acting entirely within his rights as a private citizen. Justin Trudeau was found to have violated four sections of the Conflict of Interests Act.

=== Section 5 ===
Section 5 requires that a public office holder arrange his or her private affairs in a manner that will prevent the public office holder from being in a conflict of interest.

=== Section 11 ===
Subsection 11(1) prohibits a public office holder or a member of his or her family from accepting any gift or other advantage that might reasonably be seen to have been given to influence the public office holder in the exercise of an official power, duty or function.

=== Section 12 ===
Section 12 prohibits ministers and members of their families from accepting travel on non-commercial chartered or private aircraft unless certain exceptions apply, namely travel required as part of the minister’s official duties, in exceptional circumstances or with the prior approval of the Commissioner.

While the English section of the act, written in both official languages, specifically prohibited various types of aircraft, the French version referred only to avions, or aircraft in general. Trudeau, through his legal team, would unsuccessfully argue that the French wording of the act was written too ambiguously which had caused confusion in his interpretation of the wording and subsequently that no violation had taken place.

=== Section 21 ===
Section 21 requires that public office holders recuse themselves from any discussion, decision, debate or vote on any matter in respect of which they would be in a conflict of interest.

== Outcome ==
The Royal Canadian Mounted Police determined there were "reasonable grounds" to think fraud may have been committed. They considered charging Trudeau; however, they did not do so because, as the head of government, Trudeau may have had the authority to approve the trip himself. On December 20, 2017 Justin Trudeau apologized and stated he would report future trips to the Office of the Conflict of Interest and Ethics Commissioner. Trudeau stated "Obviously there was a mistake," and that, "Moving forward, we will be behaving differently…I take full responsibility for it. We need to make sure that the office of the prime minister is without reproach."

Attempts at further investigations into the Trudeau Report, such as calling the Prime Minister to testify before a parliamentary committee, were blocked through parliamentary procedure along partisan lines.
