= Ted Diro =

Papua New Guinean Politician

Grand Chief Brigadier Edward Ramu (Ted) Diro, GCL, CBE (born 14 December 1943) is a Papua New Guinean politician and soldier.

Diro was born in Boku village in the Rigo District of Central Province, the son of a plantation labourer. He was educated at the Boku mission school, Kila Kila High School in Port Moresby and Slade School in Queensland, Australia. He studied at the Officer Cadet School, Portsea, in 1963–1964, becoming a commissioned officer (2nd lieutenant) in the Australian Army. He was promoted to captain in 1967 and to major in 1971, becoming the first Papua New Guinean major in the Royal Pacific Islands Regiment. He was the first Commander of the Papua New Guinea Defence Force from Papua New Guinean independence in 1975, serving until 1981. He was made a Commander of the Order of the British Empire (CBE) in the 1977 Birthday Honours.

Diro was elected to the National Parliament of Papua New Guinea at the 1982 election, winning the Central Provincial seat. He was briefly the Leader of the Opposition from 1982 to 1983. He served as Minister for Forests under Paias Wingti from November 1985 to mid-1986, Minister for Foreign Affairs from 1986 to 1987 and Minister Without Portfolio from August to November 1987. He resigned from Cabinet in November 1987 over mounting controversy around alleged corruption while he was Minister for Forests and having received undeclared campaign funds from Leonardus Benjamin Moerdani, the head of the Republic of Indonesia Armed Forces. Despite the ongoing controversy, he returned to Cabinet from April to July 1988 as Minister for State in the last months of the Wingti government, before again returning in that role from May 1989 to April 1990 under Sir Rabbie Namaliu. He was Deputy Prime Minister under Namaliu from April 1990 to October 1991, when he was convicted by a leadership tribunal of 81 counts of official misconduct. The conviction sparked a constitutional crisis when Governor-General Sir Serei Eri, who had been president of Diro's party before assuming the role, purported to reinstate Diro; the resulting controversy saw both Diro and Eri resign.

He returned to parliament at the 1997 election and served a stint as Minister for Agriculture, but was defeated at the 2002 election. In January 2017, he unsuccessfully sought the role of Governor-General of Papua New Guinea, with the term of incumbent Sir Michael Ogio due to expire.

== Legacy ==
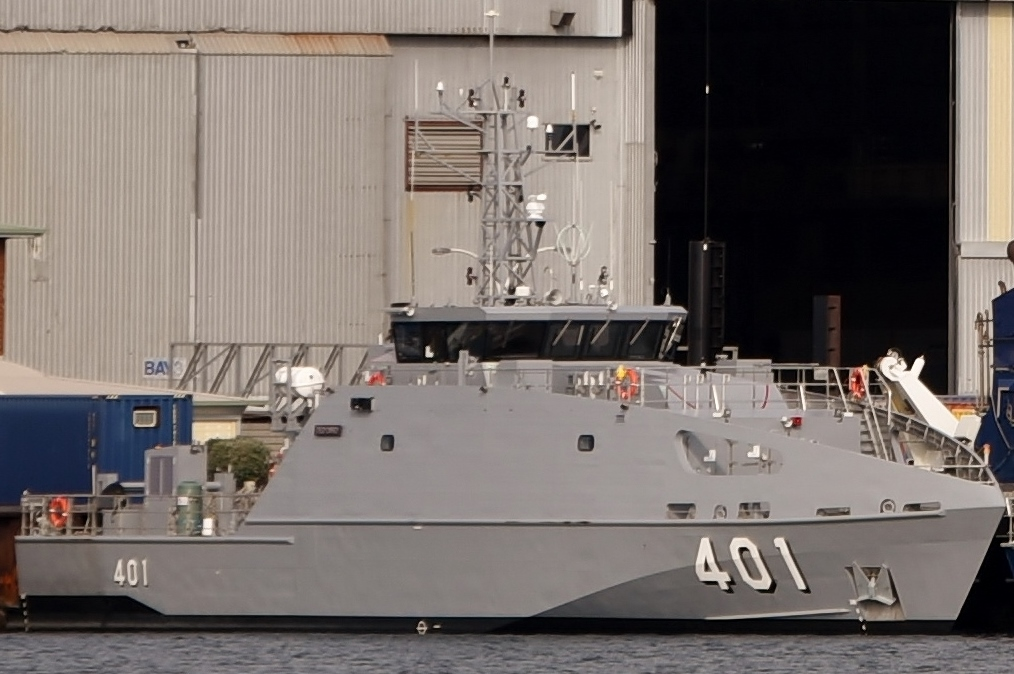
HMPNGS Ted Diro

On 9 July 2018 Loop announced that Papua-New Guinea's first Guardian class patrol vessel would be named HMPNGS Ted Diro. Australia had launched the vessel in June, and its sea trials were expected to finish by October. Delivery is scheduled for December 2018. Diro was present when the vessel was commissioned, on 1 February 2019.

Diro has a primary school named after him.

Military offices
New title	Commander of the Papua New Guinea Defence Force; 1975–1981	Succeeded by Gago Mamae
Political offices
Preceded by Akoka Doi	Deputy Prime Minister of Papua New Guinea; 1990–1991	Succeeded by Akoka Doi
