= Francis Agwi =

Papua New Guinean Army officer

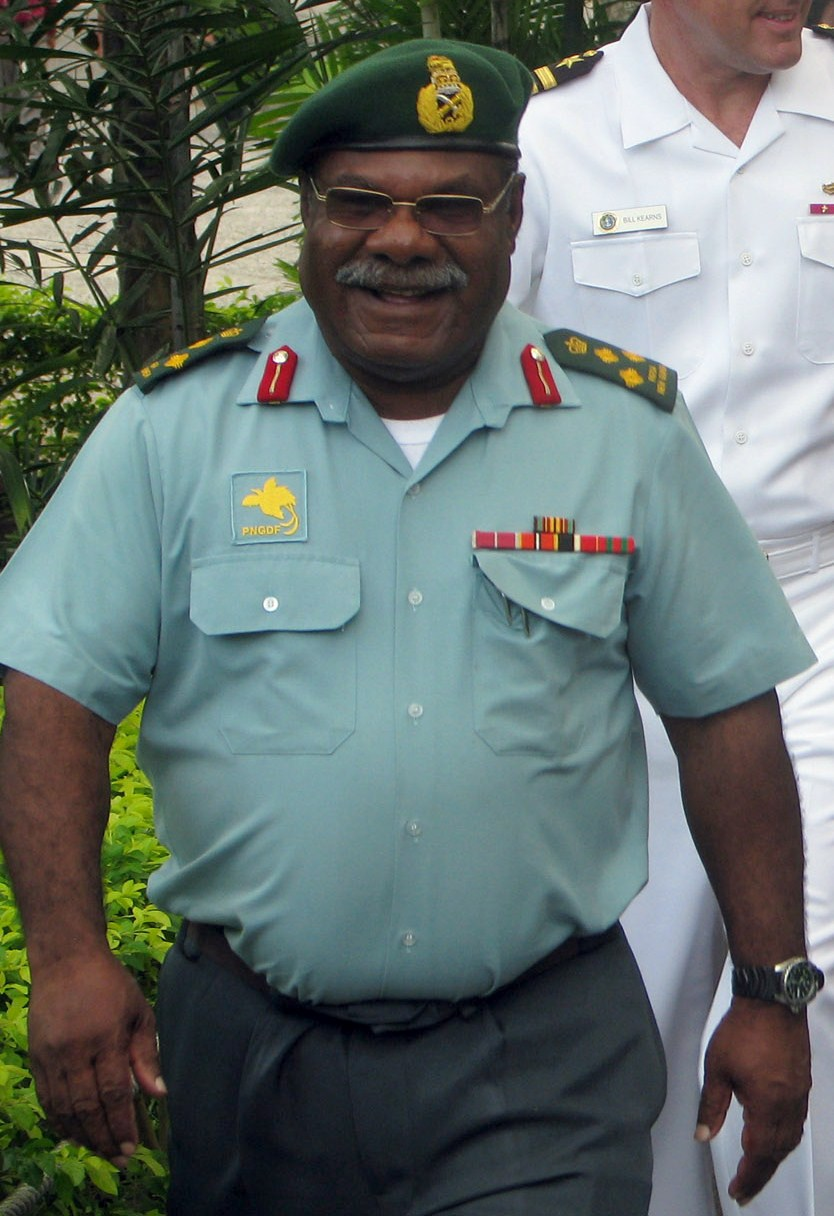
Brigadier General Francis Agwi in June 2011

Brigadier General Francis Wanji Agwi, CSM, CBE, DSM (born ?) is a Papua New Guinean Army officer who served as the 9th Commander of the Papua New Guinea Defence Force.

On 26 January 2012, Brigadier General Agwi was briefly captured and held prisoner during the failed 2012 Defence Force mutiny at the Taurama army barracks. However, Agwi was soon freed and the leader of the mutiny, retired Colonel Yaura Sasa, was arrested two days later. Sasa and approximately 20 soldiers had staged the uprising to demand the reinstatement of former Prime Minister Michael Somare.

Agwi's term as commander of the PNGDF ended in December 2013, and he was replaced by Colonel Gilbert Toropo. In January 2014 Agwi was appointed PNG's High Commissioner to New Zealand.

== See also ==
- 2011–2012 Papua New Guinean constitutional crisis

Military offices
Preceded by Peter Ilau	Commander of the Papua New Guinea Defence Force; 2010–2013	Succeeded by Gilbert Toropo
