= 2011–2012 Papua New Guinean constitutional crisis =

Rival prime ministership claims between Michael Somare and Peter O'Neill

- Date: 12 November 2011 – 13 July 2012
- Location: Parliament of Papua New Guinea, Port Moresby, Papua New Guinea
- Participants: Sir Michael Somare; Peter O'Neill
- Outcome: 2012 Papua New Guinean general election

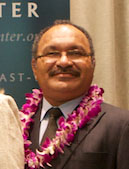
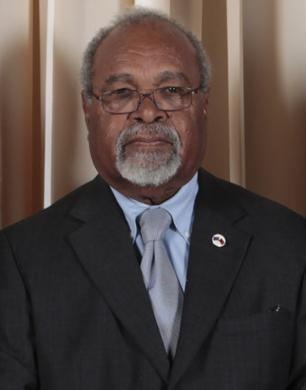
Peter O'Neill (left) and Michael Somare (right)

The 2011–2012 Papua New Guinean constitutional crisis was a political dispute between Sir Michael Somare and Peter O'Neill, both claiming to be the rightful Prime Minister of Papua New Guinea.

O'Neill had been elected by parliament as prime minister on 2 August 2011 and Sir Michael Somare claimed the post on the basis of a Supreme Court ruling on 12 December 2011. Article 142(2) of the Constitution provides that the Prime Minister is appointed "by the Head of State, acting in accordance with a decision of the Parliament." The Queen's role is executed by the Governor General. The Governor General had therefore to decide on the actual wish of parliament: the opinion identified by O'Neill or the wish as defined by the Supreme Court.

The situation raised important constitutional issues. The actual crisis cannot be understood as a question of law in the first place. It was part of a longer standing power struggle between opposition and government. O'Neill won that struggle and remained de facto in power after the court ruling. It laid the foundation for his dominance in the PNG political arena. Somare did not admit defeat. The 2012 election, however, gave a clear victory to O'Neill. Somare accepted the outcome and he even supported the election of O'Neill as prime minister. The conflict flared up again during the Peter O'Neill/Leo Dion government period from 2012 to 2017.

== Background ==
The government of Michael Somare was already challenged before the constitutional crisis. The opposition had tried to mount a motion of no confidence since 2009. This was blocked by the speaker, Jeffrey Nape, through adjourning parliament before the motion could be tabled. Somare's reputation was also dented by a leadership tribunal in 2009. That tribunal, however, treated him lightly. During the tribunal he appointed Sam Abal as acting Prime Minister. Abal was again acting Prime Minister when Somare was hospitalized in Singapore in March 2011. The position of Prime Minister became particularly opaque when Arthur Somare, a son of Michael Somare and an MP as well, announced in June 2011 on behalf of the family that Somare had spent three weeks in intensive care and could not be expected to resume work as prime minister. Arthur Somare positioned himself in this way for the post. The legality and validity of this statement was challenged immediately as Michael Somare had not been heard himself.

In this uncertain situation the opposition tried to mount another motion of no confidence. The success of such a motion was not certain at all. The government of Michael Somare had been established with the support of a large majority in parliament (86 out of 109 votes). Somare had already lost the support of some MPs when the Supreme Court loosened the restrictions on MPs to change sides. A previous attempt to mount a vote of no confidence by breakaway ministers and MPs led by Puka Temu had been unsuccessful. Somare's majority could only be confidently challenged if there was a revolt in his party, the National Alliance (NA). It was also vital that the Speaker would change sides, as he had obstructed previous attempts. When the speaker did so and allowed an open vote for a new government, the parties supporting the Somare government split. NA divided in a breakaway group itself under the leadership of Don Polye (21 MPs), opposed to a group that remained loyal to Sam Abal and Michael Somare (20 MPs). The desire not to seem displeasing to Somare may be the reason that it was in the end not presented as a motion of confidence but a declaration that the post of prime minister was vacant. This had large consequences in the ensuing court cases.

The revolt proved successful. Peter O'Neill became the new Prime Minister with the support of 70 MPs out of a 109-member parliament. However, O'Neill's People's National Congress (PNC) had only six seats in parliament. PNC had supported the Somare government since 2007. Belden Namah and Mekere Morauta of the main opposition PNG party led the revolt, but they did not become prime minister. Namah, the leader of the opposition, became deputy Prime Minister. He had also been part of the Somare government. Don Polye, who had led the revolt in NA, became the Minister for Finance and the Treasury. He had been strongly tipped for the post of Prime Minister. It was thus to a large extent a revolt from within.

Mekere Morauta on the contrary had been the prime opponent of the Somare government. He did not become involved in the ensuing struggles surrounding the legality of the first O'Neill government. Instead, he used this position to fight a vigorous cleanup campaign of public enterprises in which he attacked especially the heritage of his predecessor, Arthur Somare.

== Legal battle ==
The government of Somare/Abal was therefore not defeated by a motion of no confidence. In that case the position of O'Neill would have been unequivocally covered by law. It is puzzling that instead, the Speaker had allowed a motion to declare the post of Prime Minister vacant because of illness. That possibility was covered in the Constitution in section 142(5,c) on the grounds: "that two medical practitioners appointed by the National Authority responsible for the registration or licensing of medical practitioners have jointly reported in accordance with an Act of the Parliament that, in their professional opinions, the Prime Minister is unfit, by reason of physical or mental incapacity, to carry out the duties of his office." Parliament had approached the Papua New Guinea Medical Board for such a mission to Singapore at the beginning of Somare's hospitalization. Nothing came of that.

The next possibility envisioned concerned the absence of a Member of Parliament, and because the PM is an MP in a Westminster parliamentary system, this is therefore applicable to the Prime Minister. The relevant section 104 (d) of the Constitution reads: "if he is absent, without leave of the Parliament, during the whole of three consecutive meetings of the Parliament unless Parliament decides to waive this rule upon satisfactory reasons being given".

Somare had been absent since March but his reasons were accepted by parliament and he was granted leave until May 2012. Parliament then withdrew this leave. However, in early September Somare returned to PNG and declared that he was willing and able to finish his term of prime minister. On 6 September he made a brief appearance in the chamber and therefore the rule of missing three consecutive meetings no longer applied. On 9 December, Parliament amended the law to state that an absence of ninety days would make a parliamentary seat vacant. The Supreme Court would give a judgment on the legality of the O'Neill government on 12 December 2011.

The Supreme Court came unequivocally down on the side of Somare. There was no legal vacancy in the office of Prime Minister when O'Neill was elected. The Speaker's decision to declare a vacancy in Somare's parliamentary seat in East Sepik was similarly unconstitutional and void. Somare should have been reinstated as Prime Minister. According to the Supreme court the facts had not been correctly stated and therefore a different legal provision was applicable.

The factual situation did not change: O'Neill remained in charge. The Supreme Court heard the case again in May 2012 and came again down in favor of Michael Somare. The deputy speaker accepted the Supreme court ruling, but declared the seat again immediately vacant on the ground that Somare had been absent for 90 days. He referred to the change in law that parliament had passed on 9 December just before the Supreme Court's decision. O'Neill was therefore again elected as Prime Minister.

The Supreme Court ignored the change of law of 9 December 2011. It was also not valid on 12 December, as the Speaker of Parliament still had to certify the change of law. This brought to the fore the issue of constitutional law. The Constitution stresses separation of powers. According to those on the side of O'Neill, this implies that the Court cannot exercise executive decision making. The constitutional court can only judge on the constitutionality of a law or general measure. In this case, they were seen to encroach on the power of parliament. The legal battle was a conflict on the sovereignty of parliament.

== Political battle ==
The essence of the PNG constitutional crisis in 2011–2012 was thus whether parliament was supreme or whether the separation of powers implied that parliament was under control of the judiciary. This was not in the first place a legal battle, but a political one. It was a struggle for political support. The O'Neill/Namah government obtained that support immediately in August 2011. The PM and cabinet were recognized by the Crown through the Governor-General, Michael Ogio. It also immediately gained international recognition, and the approval of Australia was especially vital.

There remained some pockets that were loyal to Michael Somare. For example, the court case challenging the legality of the O'Neill/Namah government was opened by the Provincial government of East Sepik, the home base of the Somare family. Nevertheless, the O'Neill/Namah government seemed safe. The judgment of the Supreme Court on 12 December 2011 was therefore a shock.

Somare immediately announced a new cabinet and had his cabinet sworn in by the Governor General. Somare himself did in his opinion not need to be sworn in, as that had happened already when he became PM again in 2007. Parliament protested strongly against this. Ogio was suspended and the speaker of parliament, Jeffrey Nape, became acting Governor General. Nape then swore in O'Neill and his cabinet. Civil society organisations, especially churches, offered to mediate. O'Neill refused on the ground that it is up to parliament to form the government and not forces outside the chamber.

Somare did not come into parliament and was with his cabinet in an Ela Beach hotel. He had the support of about 20 MPs. Ogio was therefore supporting a government that did not have a majority on parliament and his position became thus untenable. He changed his mind and supported the O'Neill government. Parliament ended his suspension.

The dispute was about the power of parliament, but this does not mean that the conflict was fought with parliamentary procedures. For example, MPs stormed the house of the Governor-General when he supported Somare. It is thus not surprising that control over the police was one of the main issues during the stalemate. Somare immediately after the court case appointed Fred Yakasa as police commander. Yakasa controlled the armed response unit of the police. That unit had remained loyal to Somare and had prevented O'Neill from entering the Governor-General's office (government house). O'Neill relied on his own appointment: Thomas Kulunga. Yakasa turned to the courts and got a restraining order that he was not to be harassed. The threat of arrest was no longer there, but Kulunga disarmed Yakasa's unit a few days later.

O'Neill had control over parliament, the public service, the police and the army. Nevertheless, Somare did not accept his defeat. At the end of January he walked into parliament showing the court order and demanding a seat. O'Neill replied with a threat of arrest.

The control over the army was challenged towards the end of January. A retired army officer, Colonel Yaura Sasa, claimed to have been appointed as army commander by Somare. He stormed the main barracks in Port Moresby with a group of soldiers, and took the army commander Frances Agwi hostage. Sasa presented his intervention as an attempt to mediation: he wanted to force both parties to return to parliament and forge a consensus. Deputy Prime Minister Belden Namah, a former ex army officer, announced the arrest of 15 of the 30 soldiers involved as well as the arrest of Sasa.

The fight to control the judiciary was the most bitter fight of the O'Neill government. It was originally fought on grounds that were not germane to the issue of legitimacy of the O'Neill government. The National Executive Council has no power over the appointment of judges; that is a prerogative of the Legal and Judicial Services Commission. The NEC (Cabinet), however, has the power of appointment over the Chief Justice and it used these powers during the constitutional crisis.

Chief Sir Salamo Injia was dismissed in early November on various grounds of personal misbehaviour. The main claim was stealing from the estate of a deceased judge entrusted to the courts. This was one month before the Supreme Court had to rule over the constitutionality of the O'Neill/Nama government. The Supreme Court reacted with a charge of contempt of court for the attorney general Allan Marat and the deputy PM Belden Namah. The police commander followed this up and detained them briefly. The move against Injia Salamo was made under the leadership of the deputy Prime minister, Belden Namah.

O'Neill was at the time out of the country and declared himself not in sympathy, but he assuaged the situation by declaring that under the constitution the Chief Justice could continue to sit on the bench despite disciplinary procedures against him. The NEC withdrew the charges.

The Supreme Court comprising all five judges met on 12 December 2011 and decided that the seat of PM as well as of MP in East Sepik were not vacant and O'Neill's position was unlawful. The court came down in the case against O'Neill with a three to two majority.

The Governor General proceeded to recognise the Somare government while parliament continued to support O'Neill. The court decision was ignored by the O'Neill government and ultimately the Governor General also gave in. The government was not satisfied and pursued the conflict with the Supreme Court further. In February there was another attempt to suspend the Chief Justice on grounds of personal misbehaviour, and a panel of judges was mentioned to look at misconduct by Salomo Injia. This charge was stayed shortly thereafter by the National Court. Despite this, Salomo Injia was forcibly arrested on 6 March and charged. The National Court met on 13 March on the case and permanently stayed the charges, as these were flawed.

Thereafter the government tried a new tack to get rid of the Supreme Court judges, and announced a Judicial Conduct Bill that brought disciplining the judiciary effectively under political control instead of under the control of the Judicial Service Commission. Very soon after enacting the law two Supreme Court judges, Solomon Injia and Nicholas Kiriwom, were mentioned for disciplinary action to the Governor-General. Kiriwom had organised a protest meeting against the treatment of Injia. This led to widespread protests in the country, such as a massive student protest march.

The Supreme Court proceeded to hear the case again as to whether O'Neill was the lawful prime minister. The government asked Injia and another justice to recuse themselves from the case because of personal interests in the case. That, similar to the arrest under the Judicial Conduct Bill, would have reduced the votes against O'Neill to a single one.

At the end of May 2012 the Supreme Court decided and came down again in favour of Somare, this time with three out of five judges while two withheld judgment. Belden Namah, the deputy PM, stormed the court and took Injia Solomon and Nichlas Kiriwom in detention. The government charged them with sedition on the accusation that they had created chaos in the country.

In the meantime elections were looming and these would be the definite determinant who would rule PNG. That line was strongly taken by the new Australian Minister of Foreign Affairs, Bob Carr. There were strong forces to postpone the elections. Parliament of PNG even voted for a delay of six months. However, the decision to hold elections was in the hands of the Electoral Commission. There was widespread protest against the proposal to delay. The plan to postpone was shelved. By the time the second Supreme Court decision was taken, parliament was dissolved and electioneering was in full swing.

== Aftermath ==
Peter O'Neill's party obtained most seats in the 2012 and 2017 elections and therefore he had the right to form a government. A clear majority coalition in parliament elected him as prime minister in both cases. He faced many legal challenges on governance grounds in this parliamentary period, which O'Neill successfully deflected. The only case where the executive was defeated was over the challenge over the Manus Island detention centre, which the courts declared unconstitutional.

However, that did not challenge the right of O'Neill to his position. The power structure established during the constitutional crisis of 2011–2012 proved to be enduring: a politician who has the support of a clear majority in parliament can dominate over the whole government apparatus, including the courts. The influence of the Somare family on the contrary has been waning since then as they lost influence in parliament.

Somare's National Alliance Party was truncated from 20 to 6 seats in 2012. It was a surprise that he supported the coalition behind O'Neill despite his great enmity with O'Neill before the election. Somare never did really accept his defeat in 2011. He reached an out of court settlement of one million Australian dollars as indemnity for his illegal removal from office in 2011.

In November 2014 Somare withdrew his support for the ruling coalition. He advocated that Peter O'Neill should face a leadership tribunal because of his handling of the controversial UBS loan to acquire equity in the Oil Search company. In November 2016 he resigned from the National Alliance Party. Almost immediately after that he proclaimed jointly with his old foe Mekere Morauta the need for investigation of O'Neill's handling of the UBS loan by international and local agencies because of the alleged fraudulent nature of the deal.

Somare decided no longer to stand for office in the 2017 election and retired from politics. His most prominent son Arthur had lost his Sepik seat in 2012 and did not run in 2017. Dulianan Somare Brash, his youngest daughter, contested the West Sepik regional seat that had been secure for Michael Somare in his whole career; she lost to Alan Bird. There is no Somare name anymore in the PNG National Parliament.

The National Alliance Party (NA) survived the split in 2011. It still gains most of its seats in the highlands, but it became a very different entity. It survived the departure of the Somare family, and in the 2017 elections they were the second largest party.

The loyalists to Somare succeeded in the expulsion of Don Polye and his friends. Polye founded the True Heritage Empowerment Rural Party (THE). THE party was second in the 2012 elections, with 12 seats. Polye became treasury minister but fell foul of O'Neill. Polye, as minister of the treasury, refused to sign the UBS loan to buy back the OilSearch shares that had been lost in a previous financial deal. Polye considered it economically disastrous and the procedure unconstitutional: parliament needed to be consulted. Peter O'Neill sacked Polye and appointed himself as minister of the treasury. Polye did therefore not resign but was sacked. In the 2017 elections Polye lost his seat and THE party gained only three seats.

Belden Namah, the deputy prime minister, was relegated to the opposition after 2012. He has since been the accused in several court cases and tribunals.

Mekere Morauta resigned from politics in 2012, but came back to challenge O'Neill. He won his seat, but the grand coalition against O'Neill did not come off. O'Neill has dominated the political competition since 2011 and the other protagonists in the constitutional crisis have been overshadowed.
