= List of orphans and foundlings =

Notable orphans and foundlings include world leaders, celebrated writers, entertainment greats, figures in science and business, as well as innumerable fictional characters in literature and comics. While the exact definition of orphan and foundlings varies, one legal definition is a child bereft through "death or disappearance of, abandonment or desertion by, or separation or loss from, both parents". According to the United Nations, the definition of an orphan is anyone that loses one or more parent, either through death or abandonment.

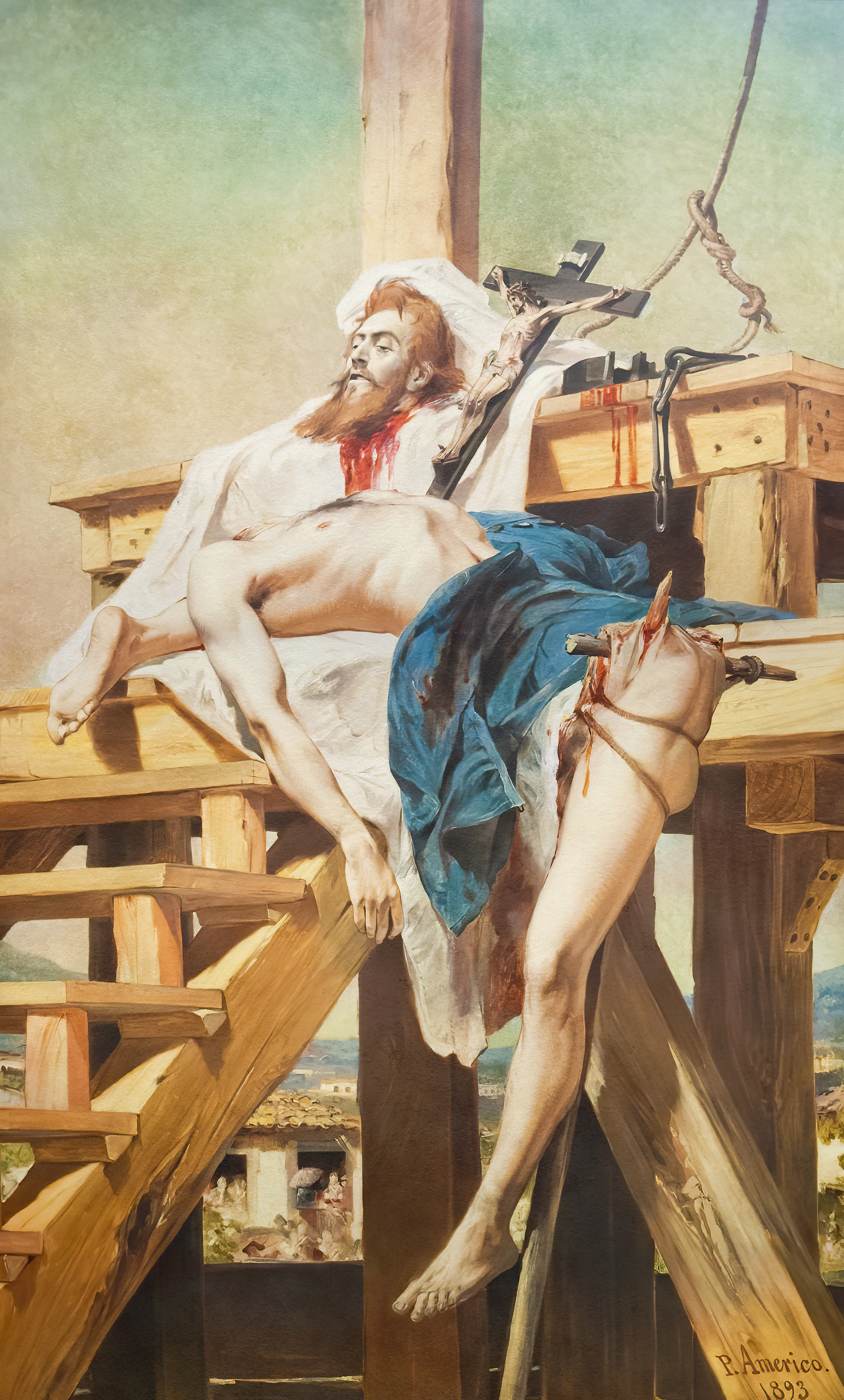
Tiradentes

== Figures from classical history and religious scripture ==
=== Africa ===
- Amenhotep III, pharaoh of the Eighteenth Dynasty
- Hatshepsut, pharaoh of the Eighteenth Dynasty of Egypt
- Thutmose III, Pharaoh of the Eighteenth Dynasty

=== Asia ===
- Andal, Tamil saint, found in a temple garden according to religious tradition
- Antiochus III the Great, Hellenistic Greek king and the 6th ruler of the Seleucid Empire
- Confucius, Chinese scholar & politician
- Esther, Jewish queen of the Persian king Ahasuerus
- Moses, religious leader, given up as an infant
- Sargon of Akkad, ruler of the Semitic-speaking Akkadian Empire
- Pulcheria, Roman ruler "Augusta Imperatrix"

=== Europe ===
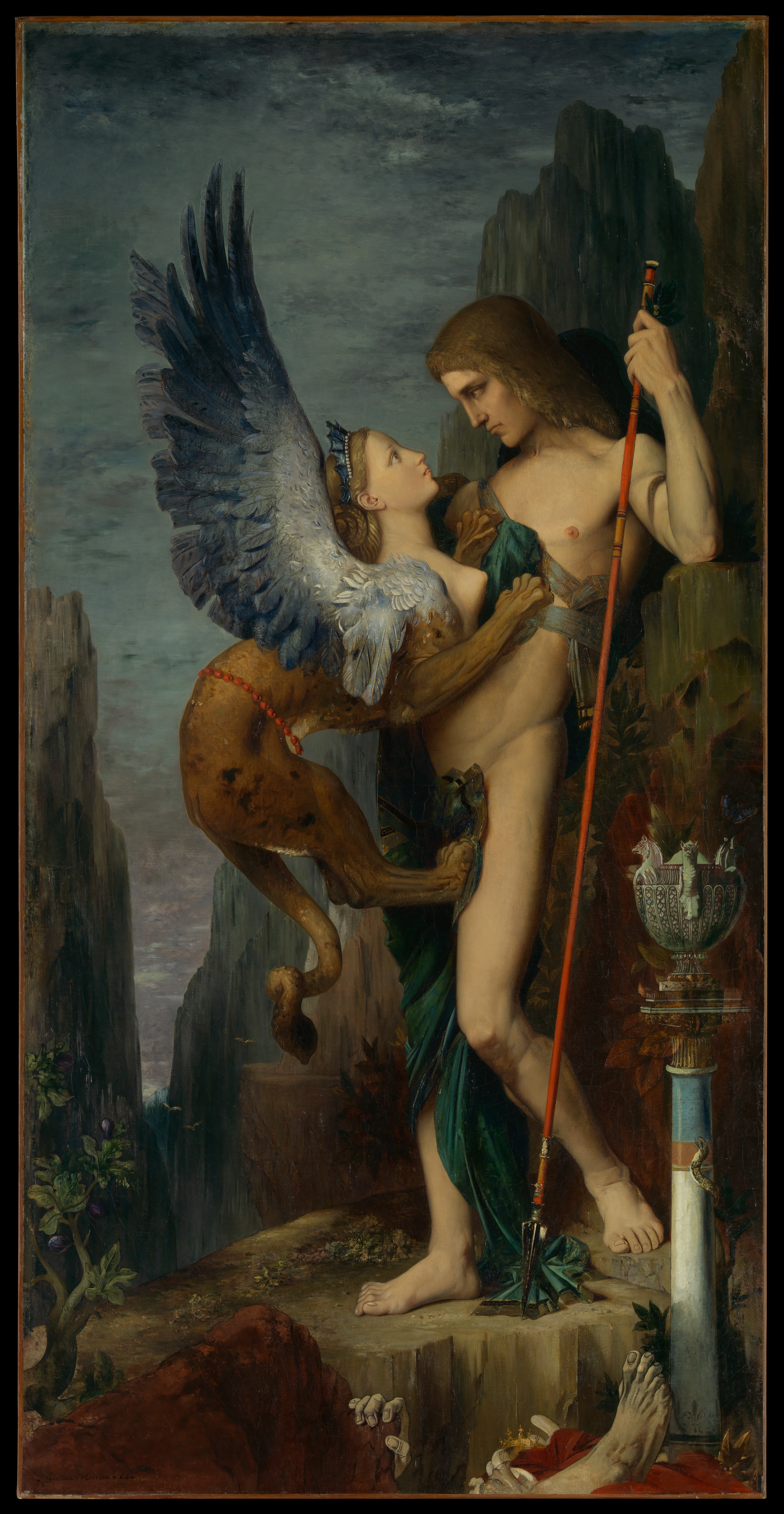
Oedipus

- Aristotle, Greek philosopher and scientist, orphaned in early childhood
- Marcus Aurelius, Emperor of Rome
- Britannicus, son of the Roman emperor Claudius and his third wife Valeria Messalina
- Caligula, Roman emperor in AD 37–41
- Cato the Younger, Roman Republic, left an orphan and raised by his uncle
- Hadrian, Roman emperor
- Juba II, king of Numidia and then later moved to Mauretania and his wife Cleopatra Selene II
- Julian, Roman Emperor and philosopher
- Oedipus, mythical Greek king, abandoned on a mountain
- Pancras, Roman religious figure
- Galla Placidia, major force in Roman politics
- Romulus and Remus, traditional founders of Ancient Rome, orphaned in infancy
- Lucius Verus, Roman Emperor

== Political, civic and religious leaders ==
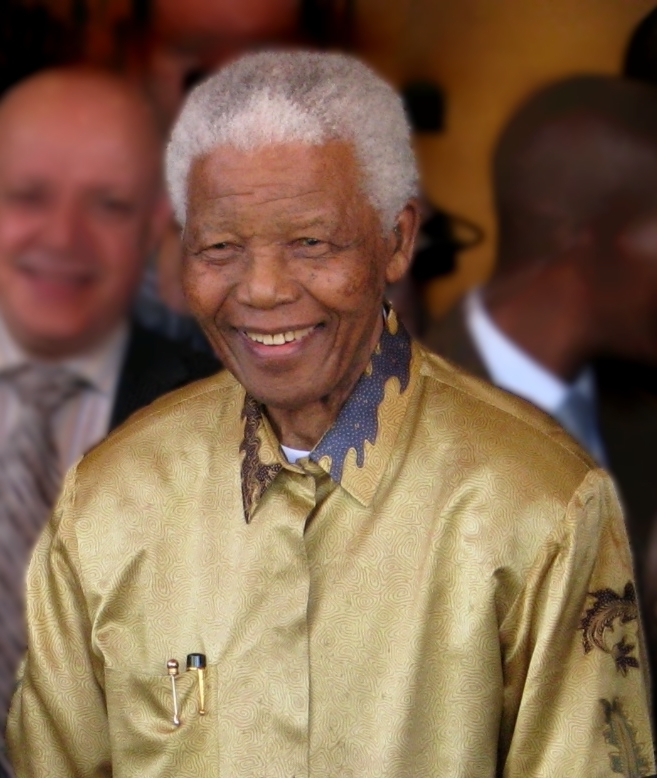
Nelson Mandela

=== Africa ===
- Al-Hakim bi-Amr Allah, sixth Fatimid caliph and 16th Ismaili imam
- Jean-Hilaire Aubame, Gabonese politician active during both the colonial and independence periods
- Jean-Bédel Bokassa, military officer and the head of state of the Central African Republic and Emperor of Central Africa
- Piet Joubert, military leader in South African Republic
- Jomo Kenyatta, Kenyan politician and the first President of Kenya
- Nelson Mandela, president of South Africa, raised as a ward
- Menelik II, Emperor of Ethiopia
- Mobutu Sese Seko, military dictator and President of the Democratic Republic of the Congo
- Haile Selassie, Emperor of Ethiopia

=== Asia ===
Genghis Khan

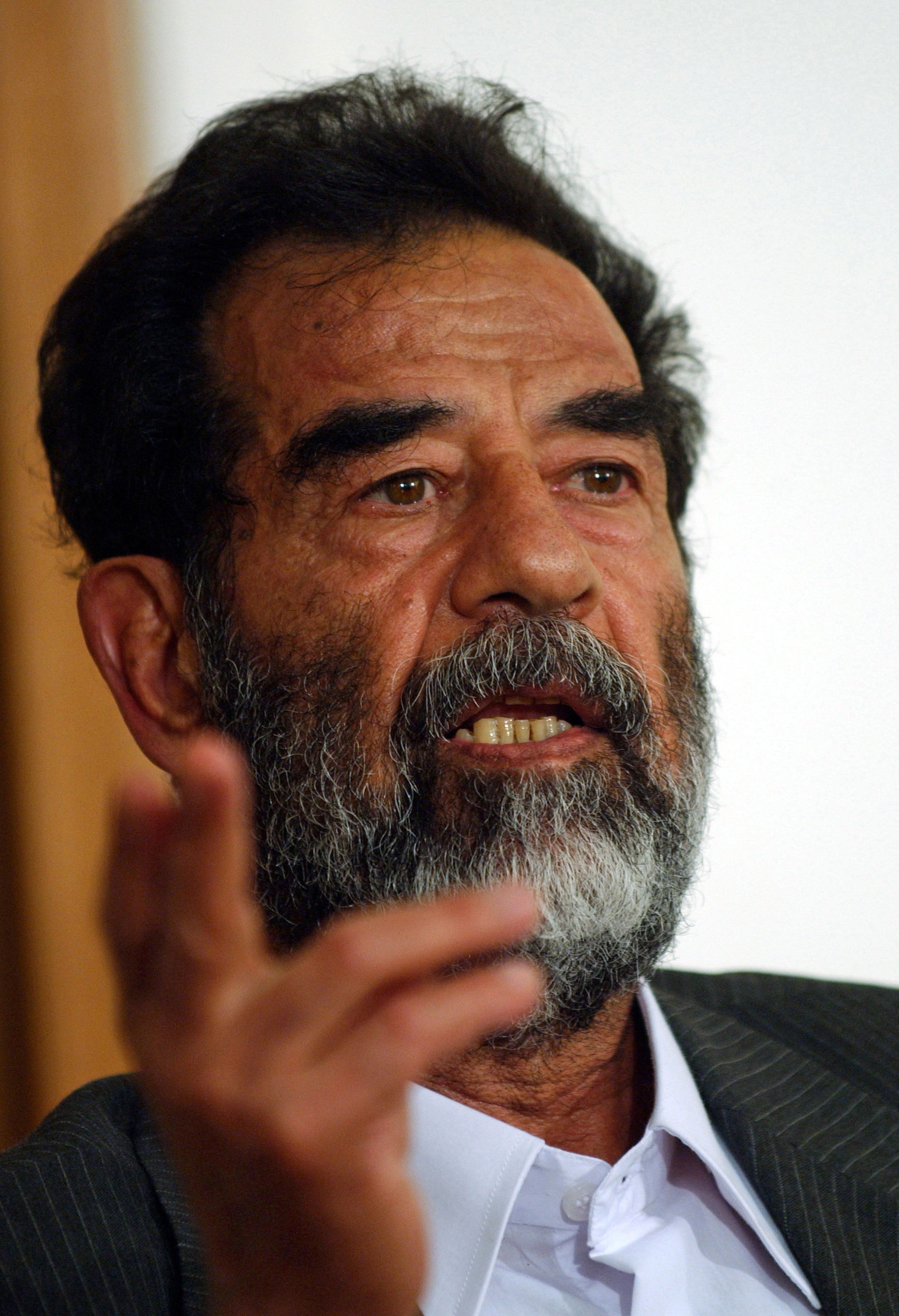
Saddam Hussein

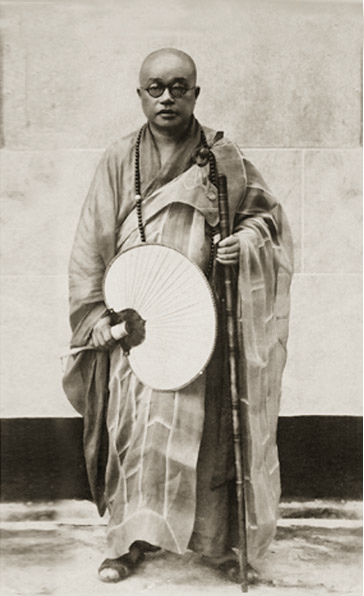
Taixu

- Abbas, 5th Shah of Safavid dynasty of Iran
- Akbar, rulers of the Mughal Dynasty in India
- Yasser Arafat, Palestinian leader
- Chulalongkorn, monarch of Siam
- Sayajirao Gaekwad III, Maharaja of Baroda State
- Go-Momozono, Emperor of Japan
- Go-Sakuramachi, Emperor of Japan
- Go-Toba, Emperor of Japan
- Hongwu, Chinese emperor
- Huineng, Buddhist monk who is one of the most important figures in Chan Buddhism
- Saddam Hussein, 5th President of Iraq
- Hu Jintao, Chinese politician and the paramount leader of China
- Chiang Kai-shek, Chinese political and military leader who served as the leader of the Republic of China
- Genghis Khan, Mongol leader
- Emperor Meiji, 122nd Emperor of Japan
- Mohammad Mosaddegh, Iranian politician, head of a democratically elected government and Prime Minister of Iran
- Muhammad, religious leader, orphaned at age 6
- Nripendra Narayan, Maharaja of the princely state of Koch Bihar
- Saparmurat Niyazov, 1st President of Turkmenistan
- Li Peng, Chinese politician
- Yitzhak Rabin, Israeli politician, statesman and general and the fifth Prime Minister of Israel
- Madho Singh II, Maharajadhiraja of Jaipur
- Seiwa, Emperor of Japan
- Nader Shah, Iranian rulers
- Reza Shah, Shah of Iran (Persia)
- Adi Shankaracharya, scholar, philosopher, reformer, Advaita Vedanta non-dualism
- Taixu, Buddhist modernist, activist and thinker who advocated the reform and renewal of Chinese Buddhism
- Theodora, empress of the Byzantine Empire
- Bal Gangadhar Tilak, Indian nationalist, teacher, lawyer and an independence activist
- Minamoto no Yoritomo, founder and the first shōgun of the Kamakura shogunate of Japan
- Zhu Rongji, premier of China

=== Australia/Oceania ===
- Paul Eagle, New Zealand politician
- Kamehameha III, King of Hawaii
- John McEwen, Prime Minister of Australia, at age seven
- William McMahon, Prime Minister of Australia, at age 8 and 18
- Frank Rogers, New Zealand politician

=== Europe ===
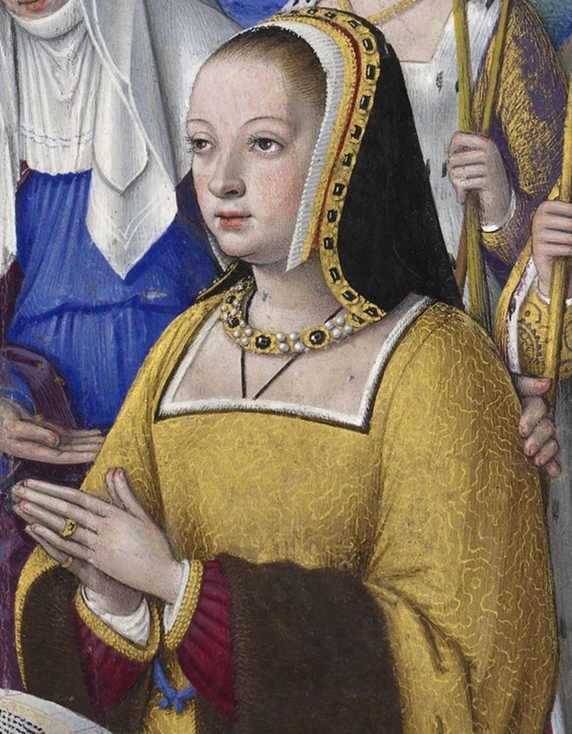
Anne of Brittany

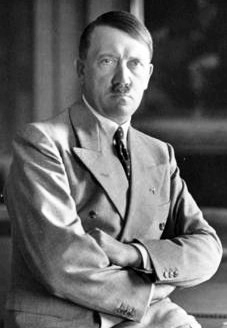
Adolf Hitler

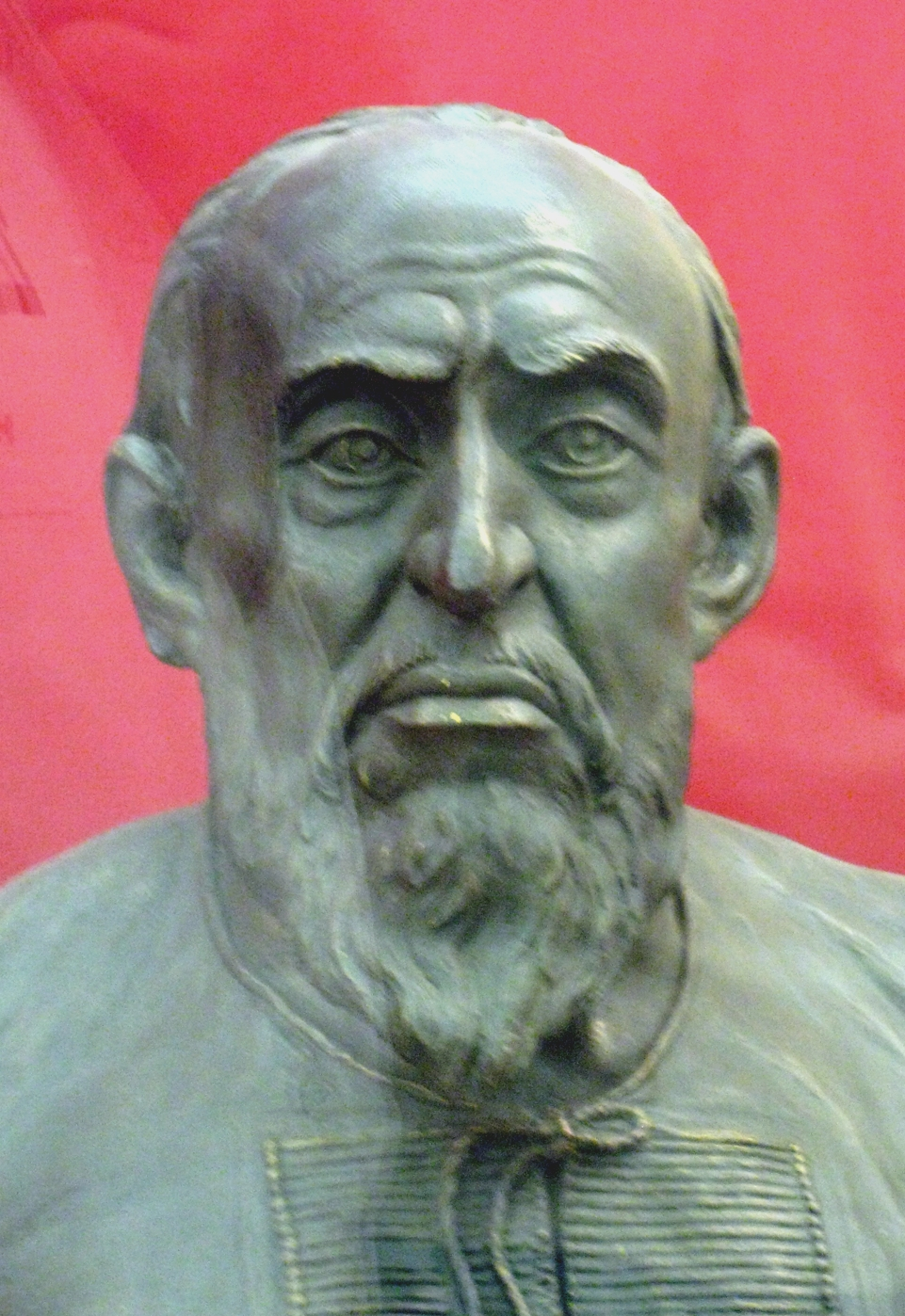
Ivan the Terrible

Louis XIV

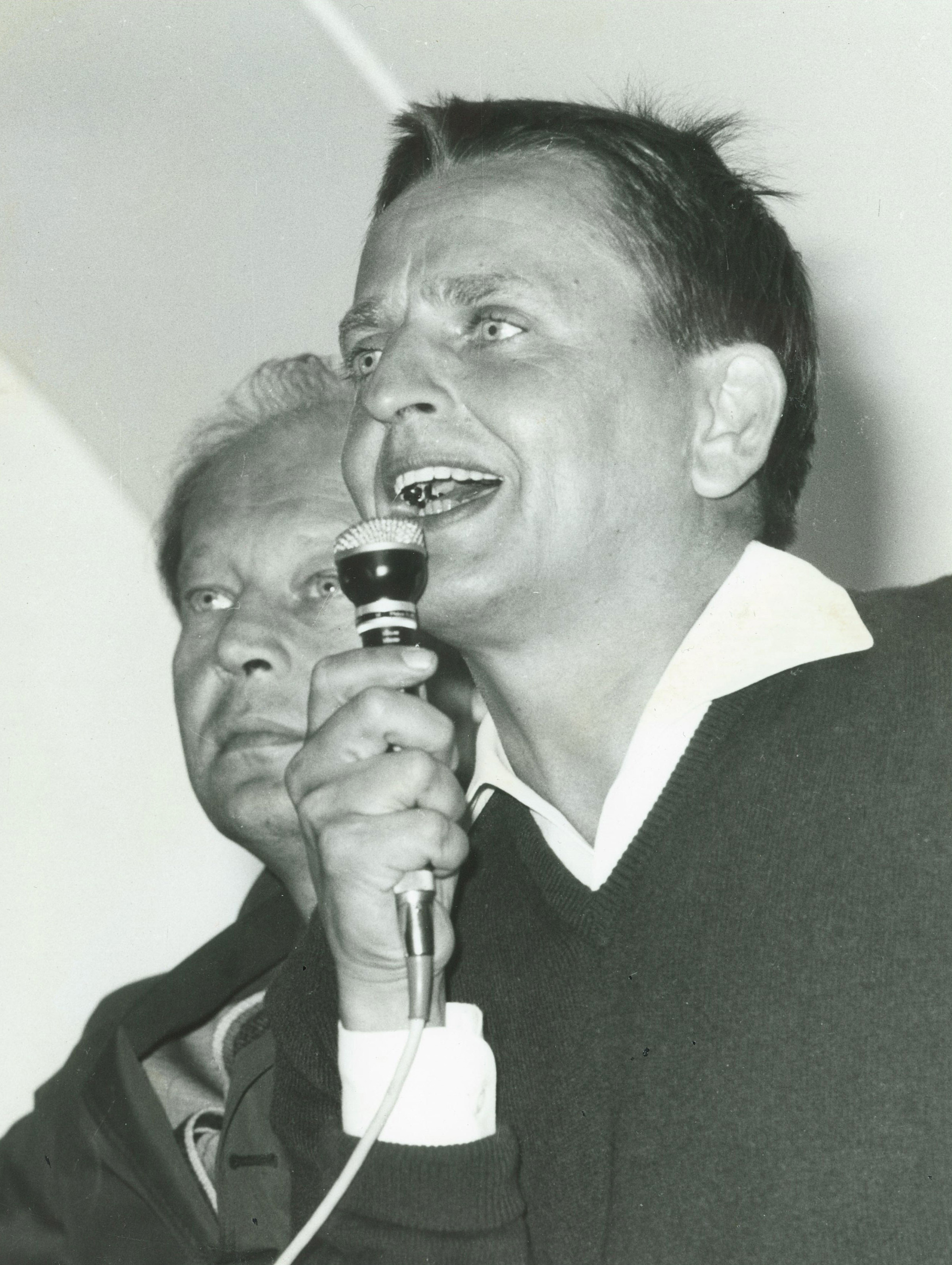
Olof Palme

- Pope Adrian VI
- Alfred the Great, King of Wessex from 871 to 899
- Yuri Andropov, Chairman of the KGB and General Secretary of the Communist Party of the Soviet Union
- Anna of Russia, Empress of Russia
- Anne of Brittany, French queen
- Anne, Queen of Great Britain, Queen of England, Scotland, and Ireland
- Eleanor of Aquitaine, member of the Ramnulfid dynasty and one of the most powerful women in the High Middle Ages
- Mustafa Kemal Atatürk, Turkish field marshal, revolutionary statesman, author, and the founding father of the Republic of Turkey
- Manuel Azaña, second Prime Minister of the Second Spanish Republic
- August Bebel, German socialist politician, writer, and orator
- Ernest Bevin, British statesman, trade union leader, and Labour politician
- Hans Böckler, German politician and trade union leader
- Charles V, ruler of both the Spanish Empire and the Holy Roman Empire
- Charles X, king of France
- Charlotte, wife of George III, King of England
- Albert Chmielowski, Polish nobleman, noted painter, disabled veteran of the Uprising of 1863
- John Church, clergyman, found as a toddler
- Pope Clement VII
- Clovis I, first King of the Franks
- Gaspard II de Coligny, Huguenot leader in the French Wars of Religion, nobleman and Admiral of France
- Saints Cyril, Byzantine Christian theologian and missionary
- Edward VI, King of England, orphaned at age 9
- Elizabeth I, Queen of England
- Elizabeth of Russia, Empress of Russia
- Ferdinand I, Holy Roman Emperor, Holy Roman Emperor, King of Bohemia, Hungary, and Croatia, and Archduke of Austria
- Frederick II, Holy Roman Emperor, medieval monarch
- Hans-Dietrich Genscher, Federal Minister of Foreign Affairs and Vice Chancellor of Germany
- Countess Amalie Elisabeth of Hanau-Münzenberg, Landgravine consort and Regent of Hesse-Kassel
- Henry VI, King of England and France
- Adolf Hitler, Fuhrer of Germany, orphaned at 18
- Salvador of Horta, Spanish Franciscan lay brother from the region of Catalonia in Spain
- Ivan IV, Russian ruler, orphaned at age 8
- Joan II of Navarre, Queen of Navarre
- John I, King of Portugal and the Algarve
- Konstantinos Kanaris, Greek Prime Minister, admiral and politician, freedom fighter in the Greek War of Independence
- Rudolf Kirchschläger, Austrian diplomat, politician, judge and the eighth President of Austria
- Pope Leo X
- David Lloyd George, Welsh statesman who served as Prime Minister of the United Kingdom from 1916 to 1922
- Louis XIV, King of France or the Sun King
- Louis XV, King of France
- Louis XVI, King of France
- Louis XVII, titular King of France
- Louis XVIII, King of France
- Maria II, Queen regnant of the Kingdom of Portugal and the Algarves
- Mary of Burgundy, Duchess of Burgundy, reigned over the Burgundian State, now mainly in France and the Low Countries
- Mary, Queen of Scots, and of France
- Catherine de' Medici, Queen of France
- Philip Melanchthon, German Lutheran reformer
- Angela Merici, Italian religious educator
- Louise Otto-Peters, German suffragist and women's rights movement activist who wrote novels, poetry, essays, and libretti
- Olof Palme, Swedish politician, statesman and Prime Minister of Sweden
- Peter the Great, Tsardom of Russia and later the Russian Empire
- Peter II of Russia, Emperor of Russia
- Peter III of Russia, Emperor of Russia
- Philip IV, king of France, called the Fair or the Iron King
- Maximilien Robespierre, French politician during the French Revolution, orphaned at age 6
- Baal Shem Tov, Jewish mystic and healer from Poland
- Albrecht von Wallenstein, Bohemian military & political leader
- Wenceslaus IV of Bohemia, King of Bohemia from 1363 until his death and King of Germany
- Wilhelm I, King of Prussia and the first German emperor

=== North America ===
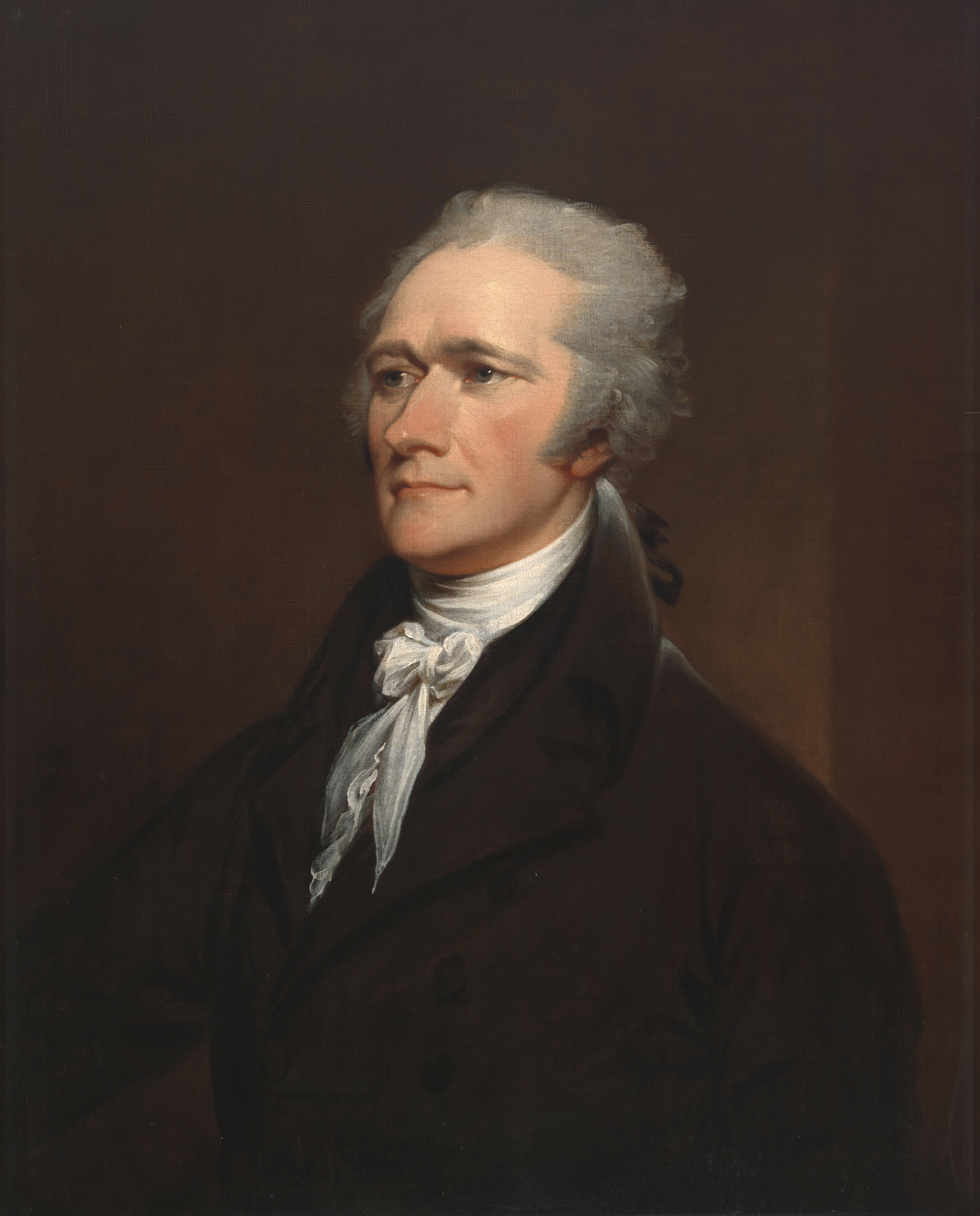
Alexander Hamilton

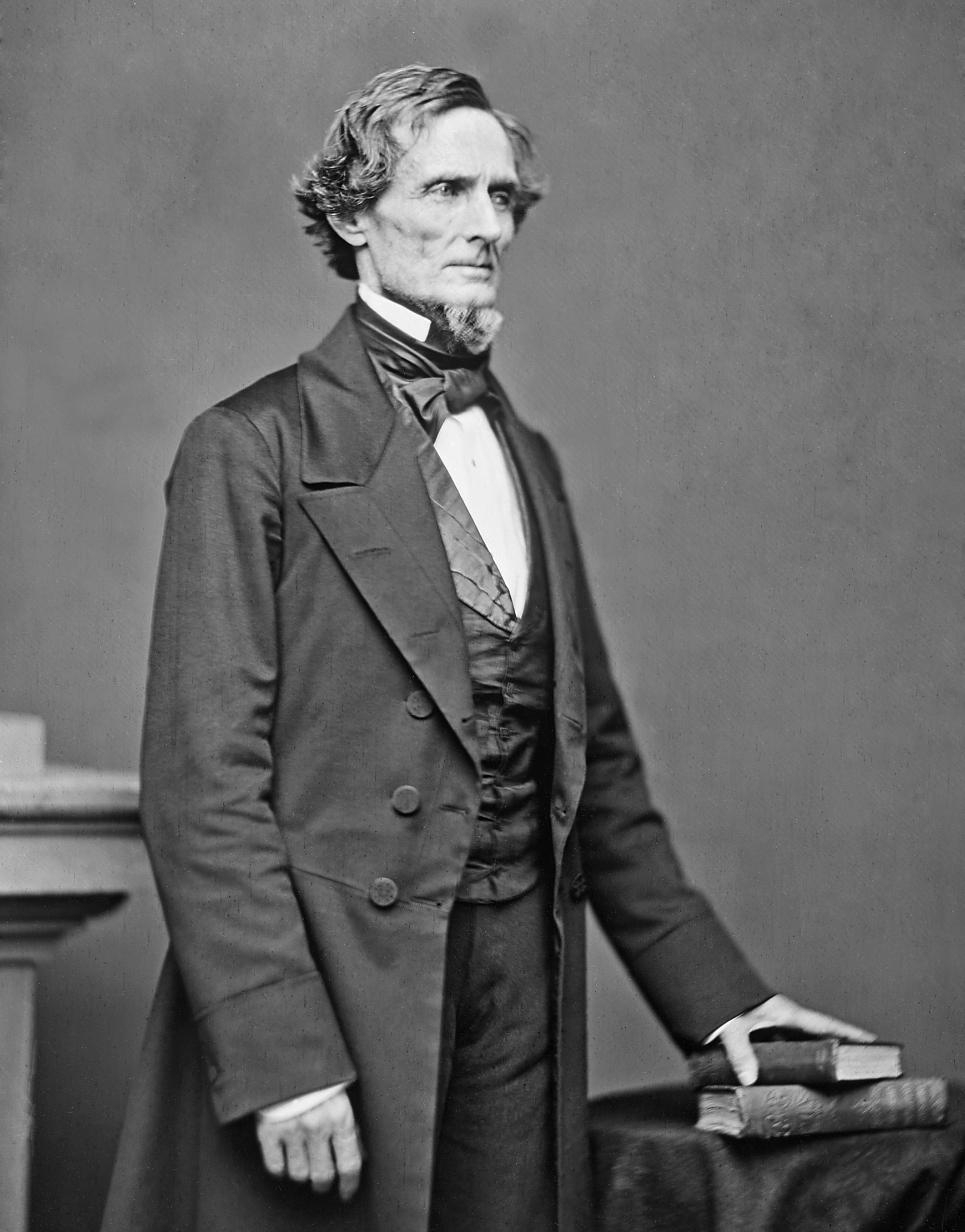
Jefferson Davis

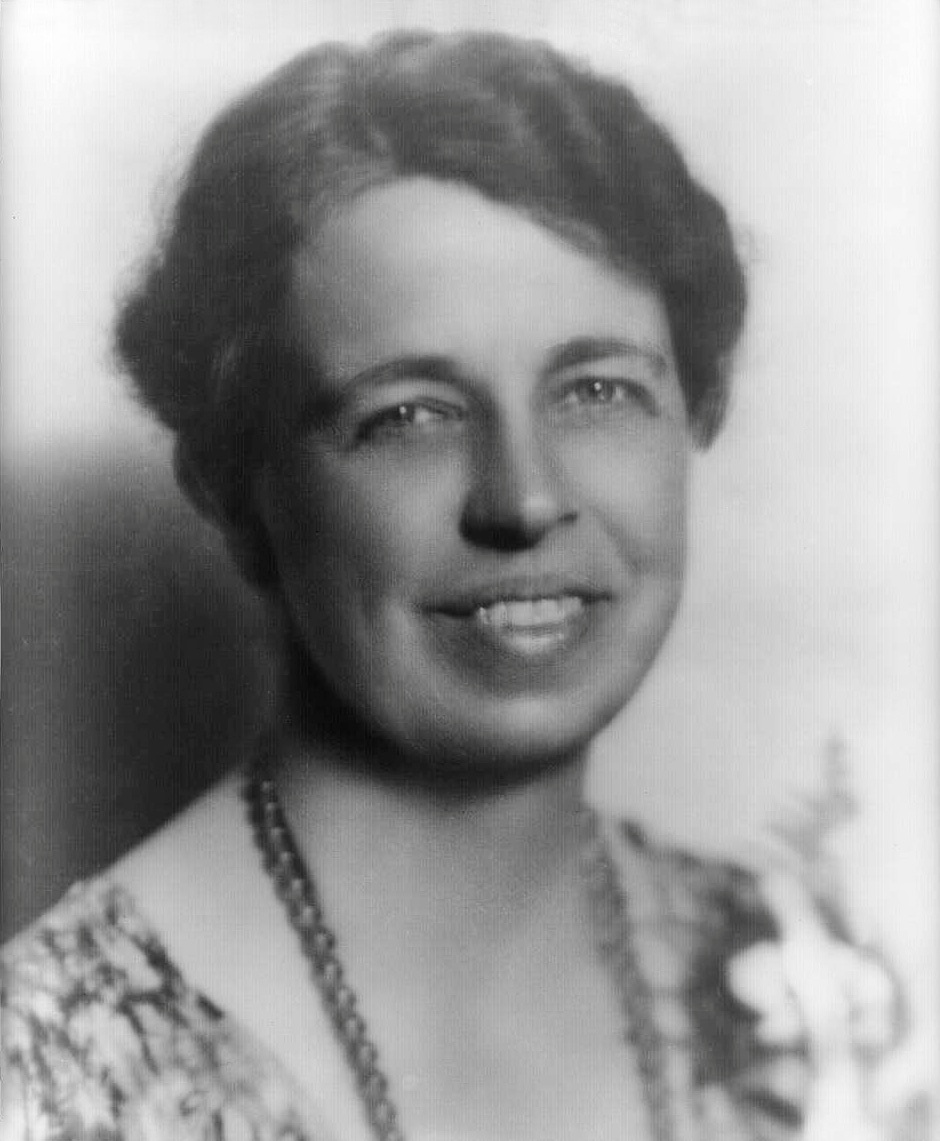
Eleanor Roosevelt

- William Bradford, colonial governor, orphaned at age 7
- George Clymer, early American politician
- Jefferson Davis, American politician, and President of the Confederate States
- Frederick Douglass, African-American social reformer, abolitionist, orator, writer, and statesman
- Peter Francisco, soldier, found on a Virginia dock as a young child
- Mariano Gálvez, Guatemalan politician, foundling adopted and raised by Gálvez family
- Alexander Hamilton, American politician, orphaned at age 13
- John Hancock, American merchant, statesman, and prominent Patriot of the American Revolution
- Ben W. Hooper, governor of Tennessee, raised in an orphanage
- Herbert Hoover, U.S. president, orphaned at age 9
- Andrew Jackson, U.S. president, orphaned at age 14
- Benito Juarez, Mexican president, orphaned at age 3
- George F. Kennan, American diplomat and historian
- Edward Langworthy, American politician, raised in an orphanage
- Moctezuma II, ninth tlatoani or ruler of Tenochtitlan
- Malcolm X, politician and civil rights activist, raised in an orphanage and foster care
- Christopher G. Memminger, German American politician, raised in an orphanage
- James Monroe, fifth President of the United States
- Eleanor Roosevelt, U.S. First Lady & activist, orphaned at age 10
- Joseph F. Smith, American religious leader, orphaned at age 13
- Tenskwatawa, Native American religious and political leader of the Shawnee tribe
- Pancho Villa, Mexican revolutionary general and one of the most prominent figures of the Mexican Revolution
- Tom Vilsack, American politician, adopted at birth

=== South America ===
- Túpac Amaru II, Peruvian leader, orphaned at age 12
- Simón Bolívar, Latin American leader, orphaned at age 8
- Pedro II of Brazil
- Eva Perón, First Lady of Argentina

== Writers ==
=== Africa ===
- Ingrid Jonker, South African poet

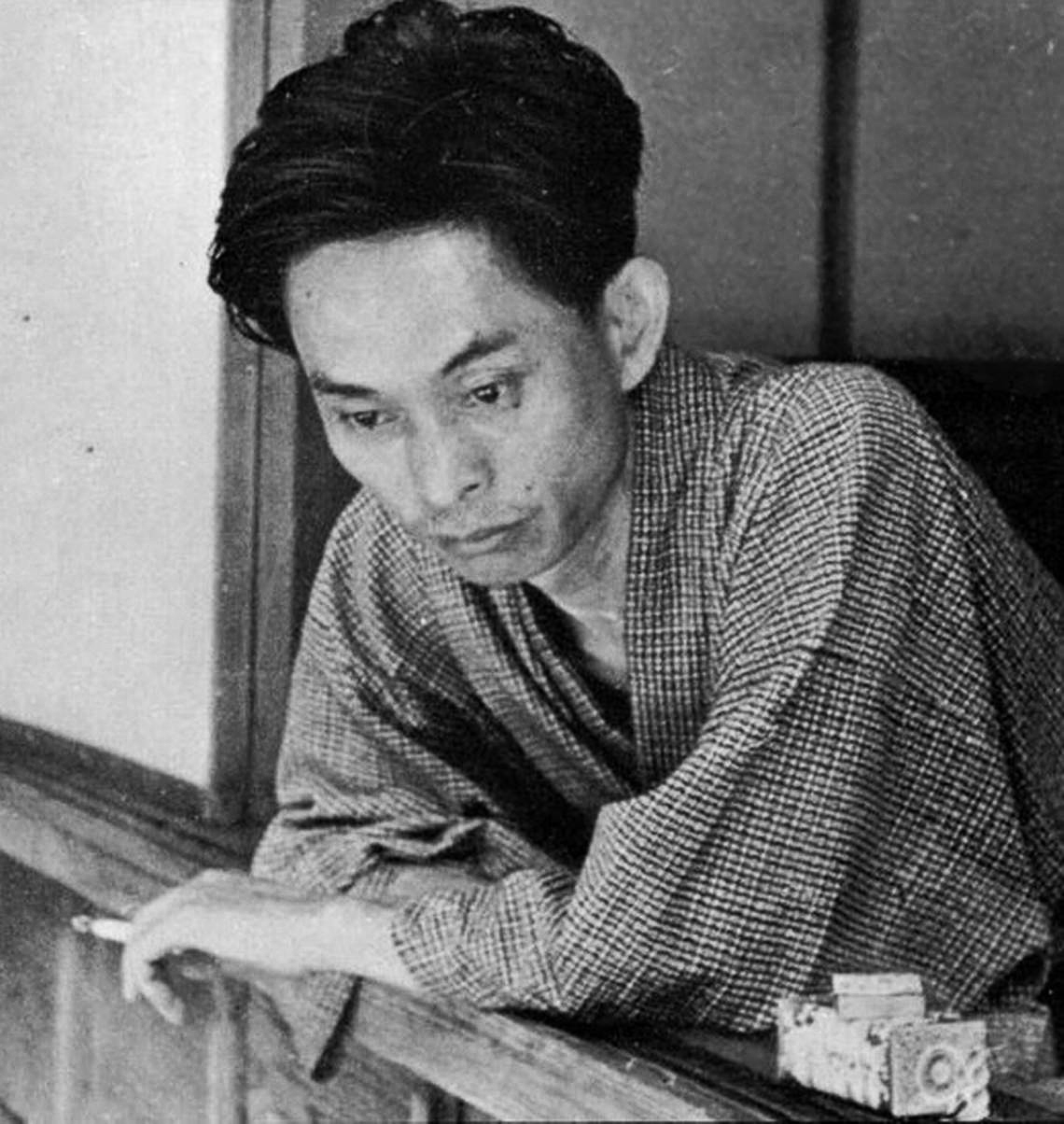
Yasunari Kawabata

=== Asia ===
- Kobayashi Issa, Japanese poet and lay Buddhist priest
- Yasunari Kawabata, Japanese novelist and subtly-shaded prose works won him the Nobel Prize for Literature in 1968
- Kenzaburō Ōe, Japanese writer and a major figure in contemporary Japanese literature, Nobel Prize in Literature in 1994
- Natsume Sōseki, Japanese novelist
- Ouyang Xiu, Chinese essayist, historian, poet, calligrapher, politician, and epigrapher of the Song dynasty

=== Australia/Oceania ===
- Thomas Bracken, Irish-born New Zealand poet, journalist and politician

=== Europe ===
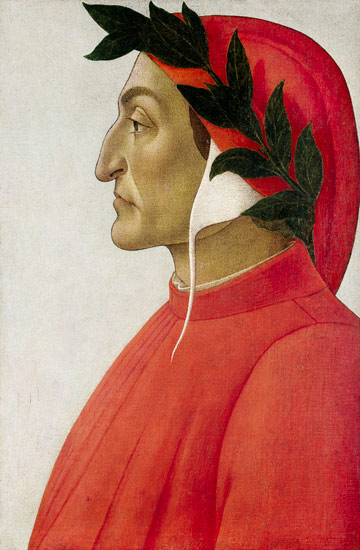
Dante

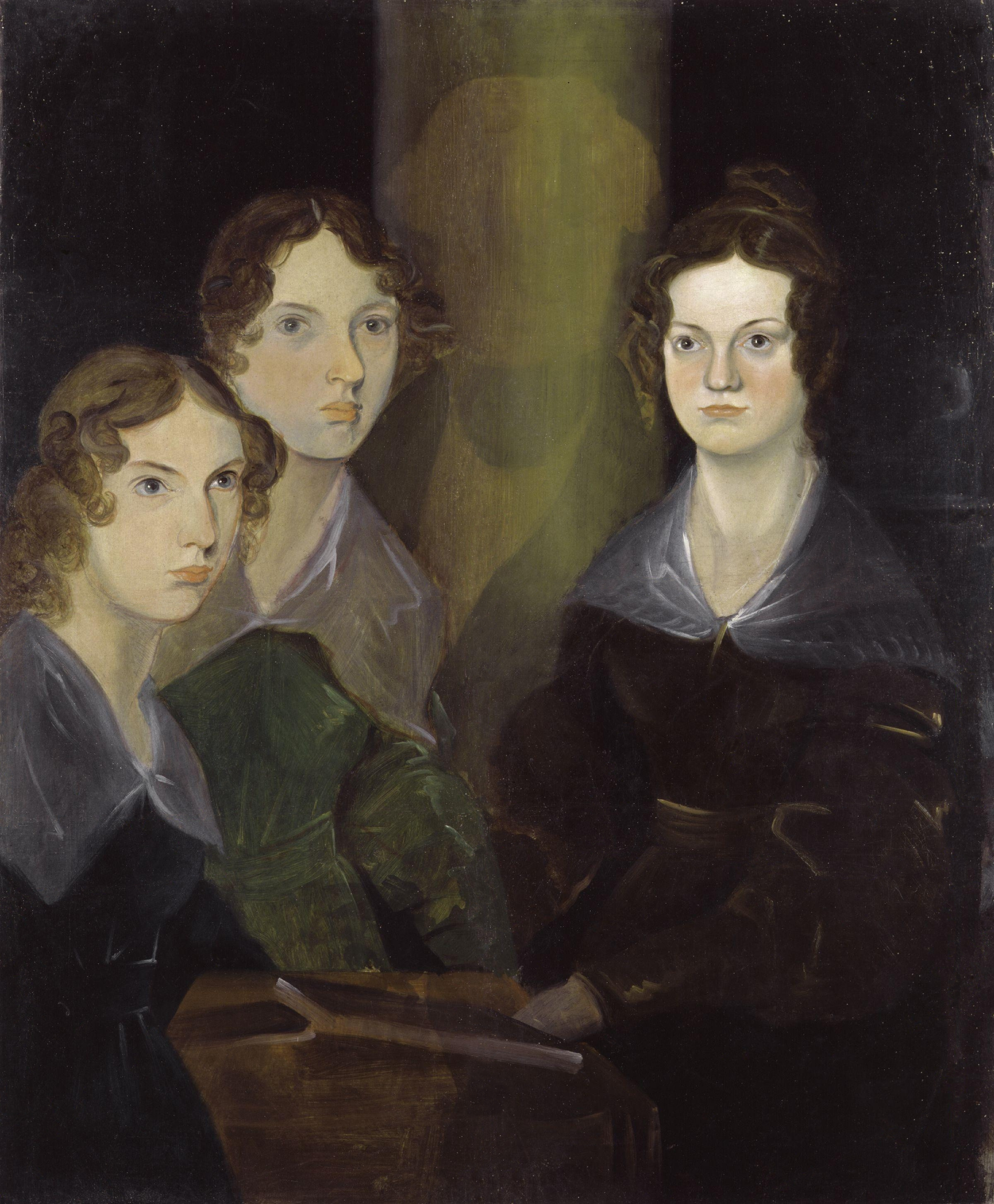
The Brontë Sisters

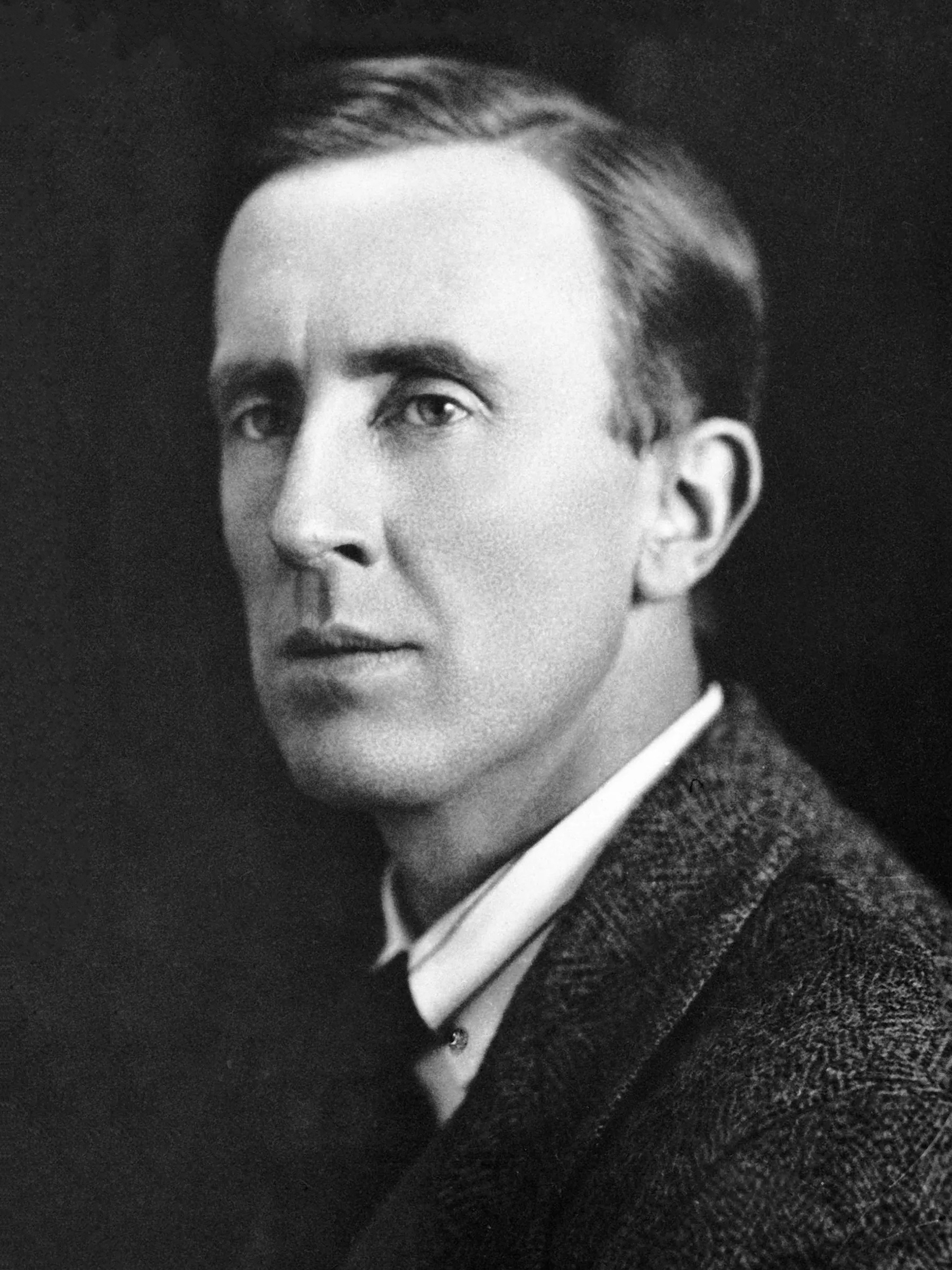
J. R. R. Tolkien

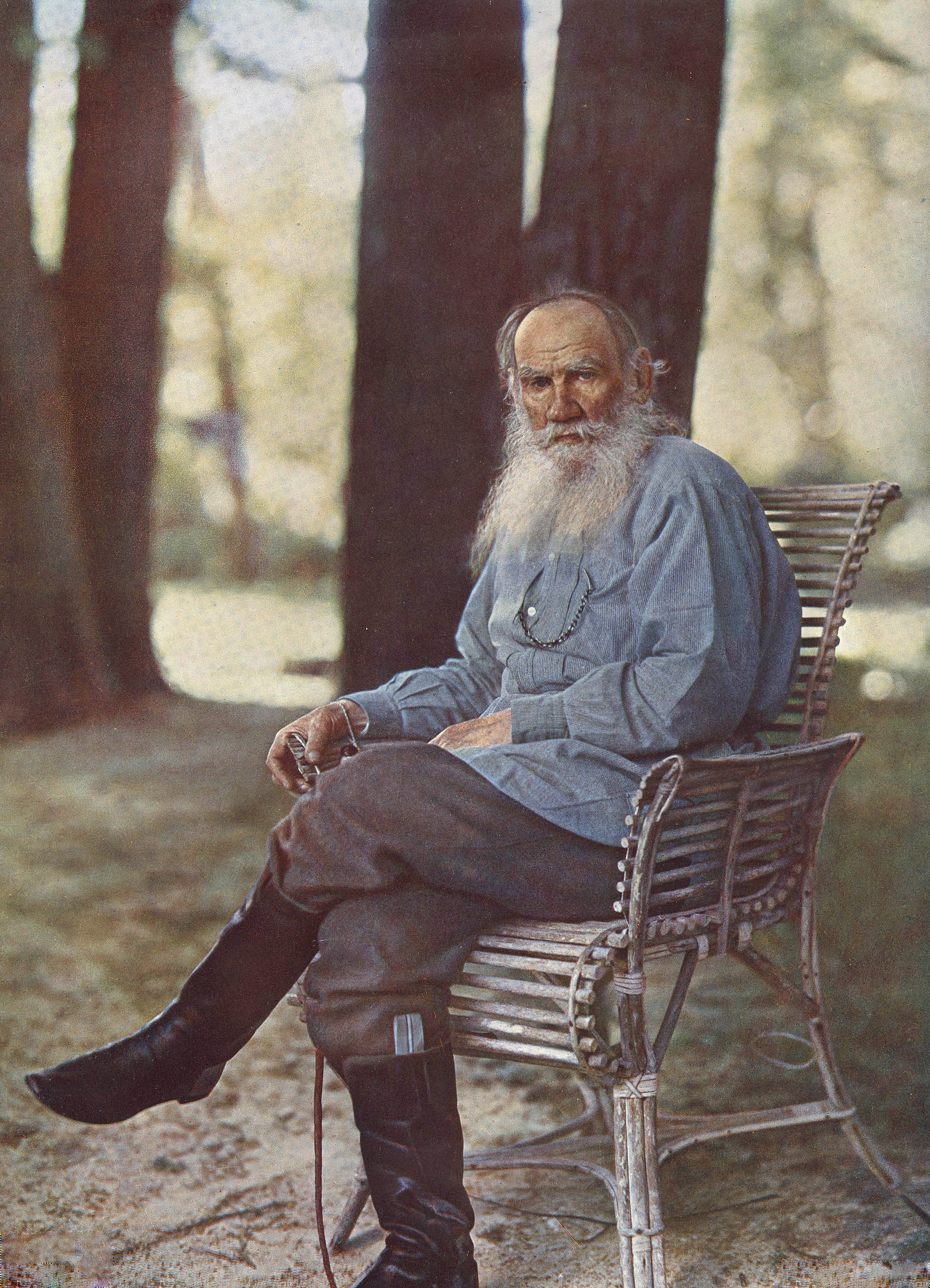
Leo Tolstoy

- Dante Alighieri, simply called Dante, major Italian poet of the Late Middle Ages
- Alfred Andersch, German writer, publisher, and radio editor
- Hans Christian Andersen, Danish author
- Achim von Arnim, German poet, novelist and a leading figure of German Romanticism
- Bettina von Arnim, German writer and novelist
- Gustavo Adolfo Bécquer, post-romanticist poet and writer
- Thomas Bernhard, Austrian novelist, playwright and poet
- Hayim Nahman Bialik, Jewish poet
- Arrigo Boito, Italian poet, journalist, novelist, librettist and composer
- Anthony Burgess, English writer and composer
- The Brontë Sisters, English poets and novelists
- Albert Camus, French-Algerian philosopher, author, dramatist, and journalist
- Joseph Conrad, Polish-British author, orphaned at age 11
- Hedwig Courths-Mahler, German writer of formula fiction romantic novels
- Fyodor Dostoyevsky, Russian novelist, short story writer, essayist, journalist and philosopher
- Jean Genet, French novelist, playwright, poet, essayist, and political activist. In his early life he was a vagabond and petty criminal, but he later became a writer and playwright
- Nikolai Gogol, Russian/ Ukrainian novelist, short story writer and playwright
- Yvan Goll, French-German poet
- Maxim Gorky, Russian and Soviet writer, a founder of the socialist realism literary method and a political activist
- Karoline von Günderrode, German Romantic poet
- Jacob Grimm and Wilhelm Grimm, German anthropologist, philologist, jurist, and folklorist
- Alfred Grosser, German-French writer, sociologist, and political scientist
- Friedrich Hölderlin, German poet and philosopher
- Joris-Karl Huysmans, French novelist and art critic
- Attila József, Hungarian poet
- John Keats, English Romantic poet, orphaned at age 14 and raised partly by his grandmother
- Friedrich Maximilian von Klinger, German dramatist and novelist
- Eugen Kogon, Historian and Nazi concentration camp survivor
- Jules Laforgue, Franco-Uruguayan poet, often referred to as a Symbolist poet.
- Hugh Leonard, Irish dramatist, television writer and essayist, abandoned as an infant
- Mikhail Lermontov, Russian Romantic writer, poet and painter
- Thomas Mann, German novelist, short story writer, social critic, philanthropist, essayist, and Nobel Prize in Literature laureate
- Harry Martinson, Swedish author, poet and former sailor, He was awarded a joint Nobel Prize in Literature.
- W. Somerset Maugham, British playwright, novelist and short story writer, orphaned at age 10
- Andy McNab, English soldier and novelist, found as a baby on the steps of hospital
- Montesquieu, French man of letters, political philosopher and judge
- Eduard Mörike, German writer
- Gérard de Nerval, was the pen name of the French writer, poet, and translator
- Seán O'Casey, Irish dramatist and memoirist
- Georges Perec, French novelist, filmmaker, documentalist and essayist
- Fernando Pessoa, was a Portuguese poet, writer, literary critic, translator, publisher, and philosopher
- Abbé Prévost, French author and novelist
- Anatoly Pristavkin, Russian writer and public figure
- Jean Racine, French playwright, orphaned at age 4
- Bertrand Russell, British philosopher, logician, writer and Nobel Prize for Literature laureate
- George Sand, French novelist and memoirist
- Albertine Sarrazin, French author
- Arno Schmidt, German author and translator
- Torquato Tasso, Italian poet of the 16th century
- J. R. R. Tolkien, English writer, poet, philologist and university professor, orphaned at age 12
- Leo Tolstoy, Russian author, orphaned at age 9
- William Wordsworth, English Romantic poet, orphaned at age 12

=== North America ===
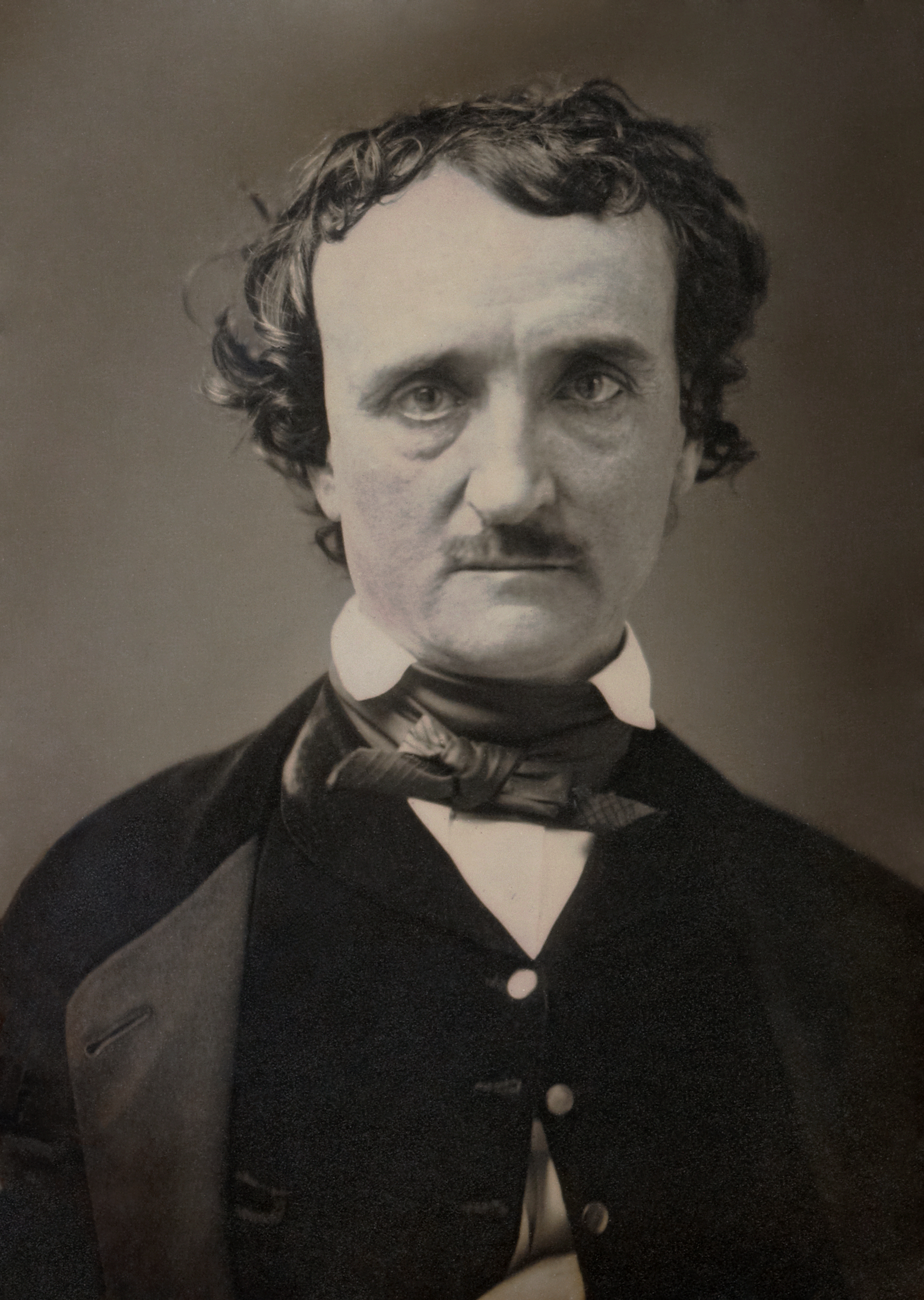
Edgar Allan Poe

- Edward Albee, American playwright, adopted as an infant
- Elizabeth Bishop, North American poet and short story writer. Effectively orphaned during early childhood, she lived with her maternal grandparents on a farm in Great Village, Nova Scotia.
- Neal Cassady, was a major figure and muse of the Beat Generation of the 1950s and the psychedelic and counterculture movements of the 1960s
- Gregory Corso, was an American poet and a key member of the Beat movement
- Jan Kerouac, was an American writer and the only child of beat generation author Jack Kerouac and Joan Haverty Kerouac
- Mary McCarthy, American novelist, critic and political activist
- Herman Melville, American novelist, short story writer, and poet of the American Renaissance period
- James A. Michener, American author, abandoned as an infant
- Sylvia Plath, poet, novelist, and short-story writer
- Juan Rulfo, Mexican writer, screenwriter and photographer
- Edgar Allan Poe, author, orphaned at age 2
- Theodore Roethke, an American poet
- William Saroyan, Armenian-American novelist, playwright, and short story writer
- Henry Morton Stanley, Welsh-American journalist and explorer, raised in a workhouse
- Gertrude Stein, American novelist, poet, playwright, and art collector
- Dale Wasserman, American playwright, orphaned at age 9
- Pete Wells, American food critic, adopted as an infant

== Musicians and singers ==
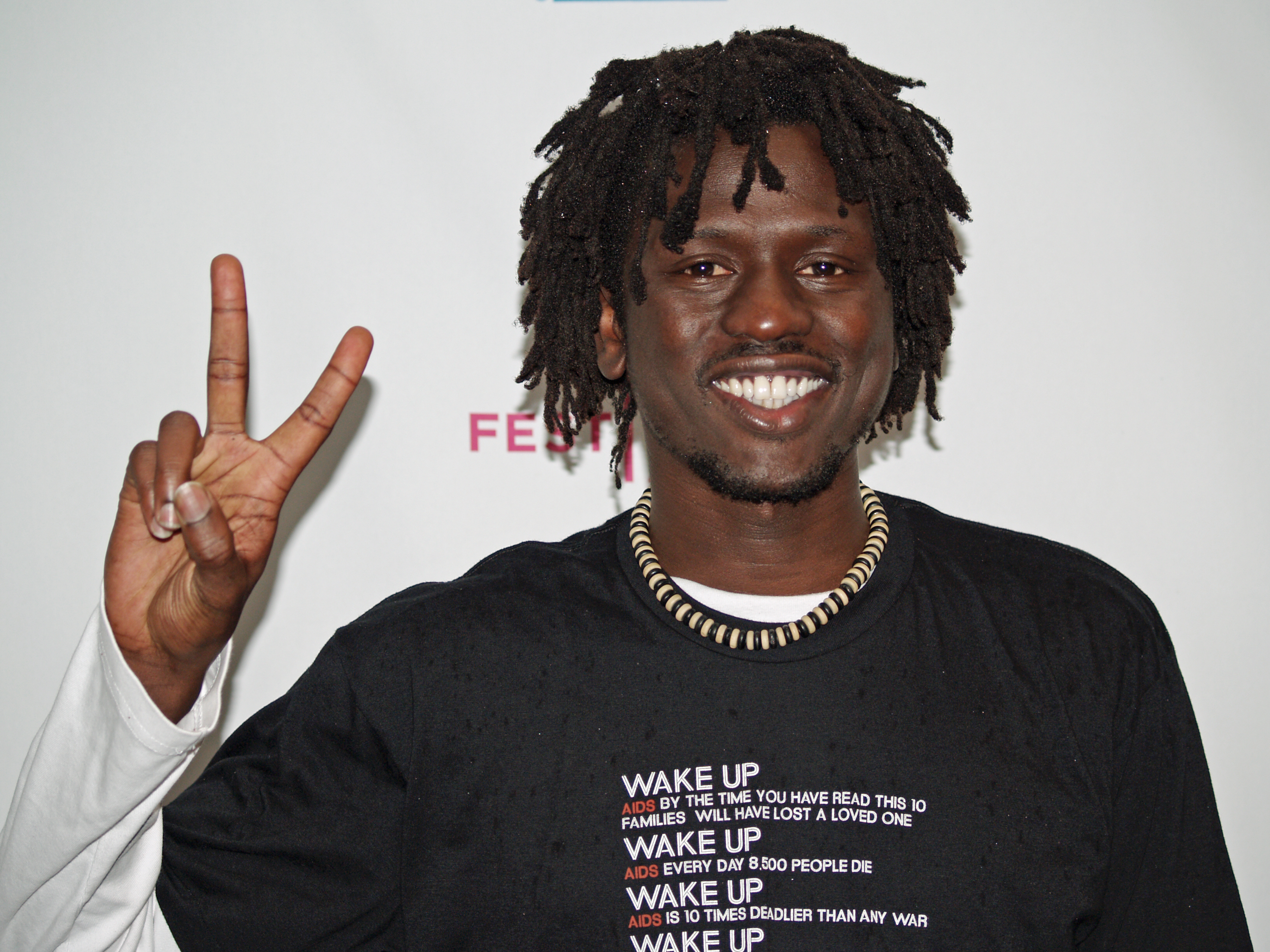
Emmanuel Jal

=== Africa ===
- Cesária Évora, Cape Verdean popular singer
- Emmanuel Jal, South Sudanese-Canadian rapper
- Miriam Makeba, South African singer and activist

=== Asia ===
- Juan Karlos Labajo, Filipino singer, abandoned by father, and mother died at age 12
- Choi Sung-bong, singer of the Republic of Korea

=== Australia/Oceania ===
- Kiri Te Kanawa, New Zealand soprano singer, adopted as an infant

=== Europe ===
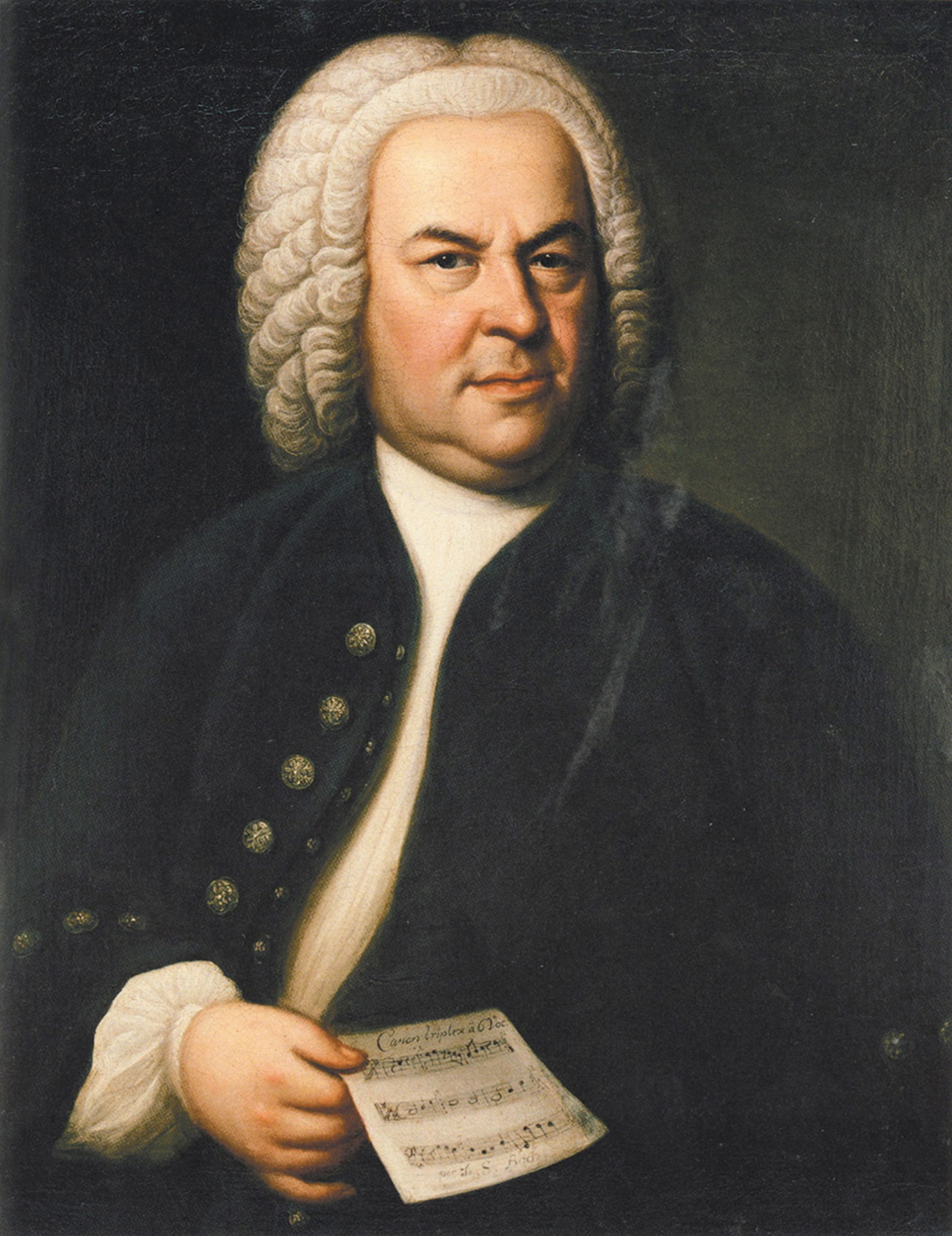
Johann Sebastian Bach

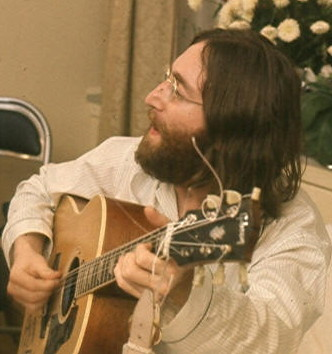
John Lennon

- Johann Sebastian Bach, German composer, orphaned at age 9
- Béla Bartók, Hungarian composer, pianist, and ethnomusicologist
- Ludwig van Beethoven, German composer and pianist. Beethoven remains one of the most admired composers in the history of Western music;
- Alban Berg, Austrian composer of the Second Viennese School
- Anton Bruckner, Austrian composer known for his symphonies, masses, and motets
- Josquin des Prez, French composer and singer of the Renaissance
- Christoph Eschenbach, German-born musician
- Paul Gerhardt, German theologian, Lutheran minister and hymnodist
- George Frideric Handel, German-born Baroque composer becoming well known for his operas, oratorios, anthems, concerti grossi and organ concertos
- John Koukouzelis, Albanian Orthodox Christian composer
- John Lennon, English singer, raised by aunt and uncle
- John Lundvik, Swedish singer, songwriter, and former sprinter
- Anni-Frid Lyngstad, Swedish pop and jazz singer
- Henry Purcell, English composer
- Mstislav Rostropovich, Soviet and Russian cellist and conductor
- Antonio Salieri, Italian classical composer, conductor, and teacher
- Franz Schubert, Austrian composer of the late Classical and early Romantic eras
- Karlheinz Stockhausen, German composer
- Wilhelm Richard Wagner, was a German composer, theatre director, polemicist, and conductor

=== North America ===
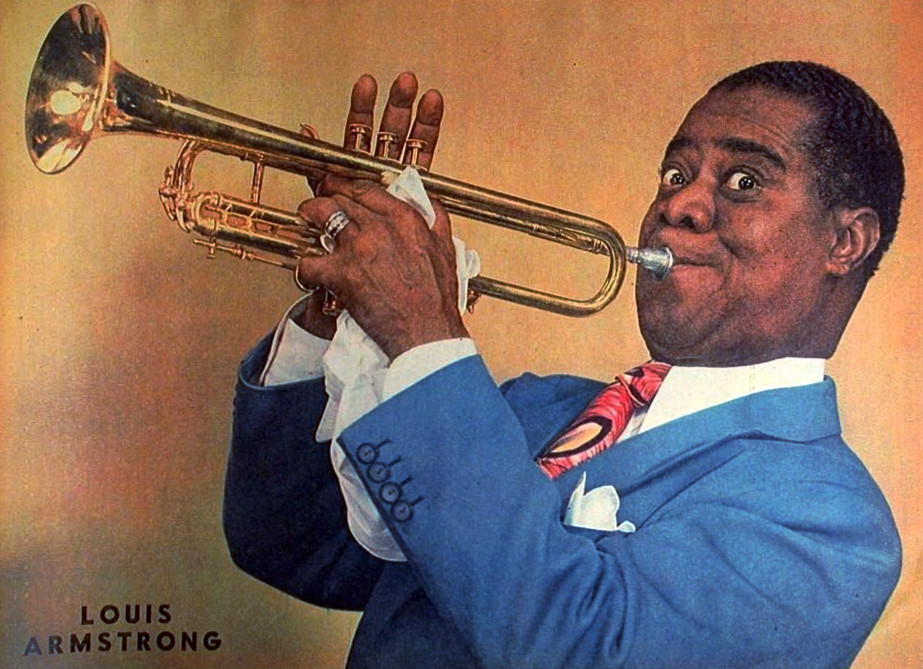
Louis Armstrong

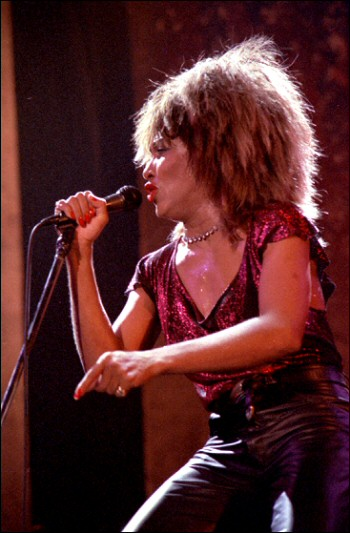
Tina Turner

- Louis Armstrong, American musician, raised in an orphanage and by his grandmother
- Hank Ballard, American rhythm and blues singer and songwriter
- John Birks "Dizzy" Gillespie, was an American jazz trumpeter, bandleader, composer, educator and singer.
- Charles Bradley, was an American singer
- Chester Arthur Burnett, better known by his stage name Howlin' Wolf, was a blues singer and guitarist, regarded as one of the most influential blues musicians of all time.
- Ray Charles, American singer, orphaned at age 15
- Ibrahim Ferrer, Afro-Cuban musician
- Ella Fitzgerald, American jazz singer, orphaned in childhood
- Kirk Franklin, American gospel musician
- James Hetfield, American singer, orphaned by cancer at 16
- Faith Hill, American singer, adopted as an infant
- Billie Holiday, American jazz singer, intermittently abandoned in childhood
- Curtis Jackson, American rapper, raised by grandparents after mother's death at age 8
- Al Jolson, American singer, comedian, and actor
- B. B. King, American blues singer, electric guitarist, songwriter, and record producer
- Eartha Kitt, American singer, actress, activist and voice actress
- Jenkins Orphanage, American band in US
- Mims, American hip hop recording artist, orphaned at age 13
- Sonny Moore, American electronic dance music producer, adopted as an infant
- That Mexican OT, American hip-hop artist. Orphaned at age 8.
- Trent Reznor, American singer, abandoned by parents at age 5 and raised by grandparents
- Jimmie Rodgers, American country singer
- John Rzeznik, American musician, orphaned at age 15
- Bessie Smith, American blues singer, orphaned at age 9
- Tina Turner, American singer, intermittently abandoned in childhood
- Tom Waits, American musician, composer, songwriter and actor. His father left when he was 10
- Muddy Waters, American blues musician
- Jimmy Wayne, American country music singer, homeless foster teen taken in by a couple in their 70s
- Z-Ro, American hip-hop artist. Orphaned at age 6.

=== South America ===
- Víctor Jara, Chilean poet, singer-songwriter, teacher, theatre director and political activist
- Milton Nascimento, Brazilian singer, songwriter and guitarist

== Artists, actors, and entertainers ==
=== Africa ===
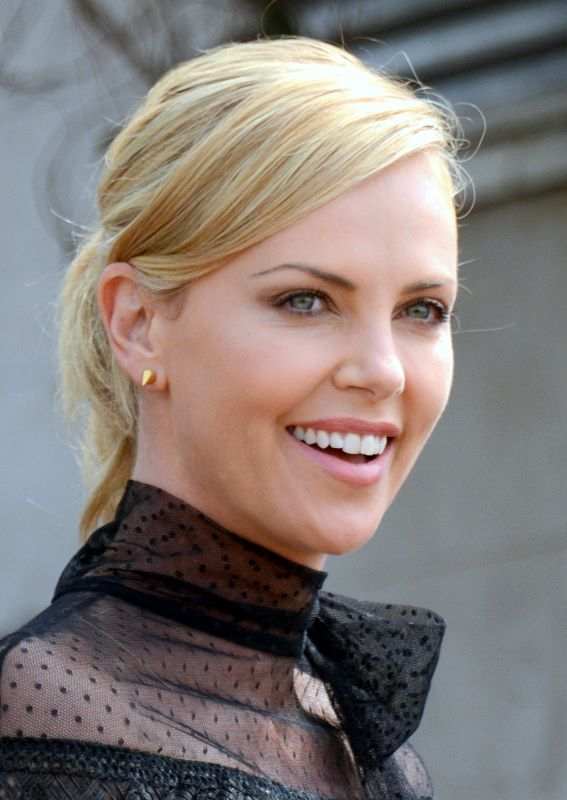
Charlize Theron

- Michaela DePrince, Sierra Leonean-American ballet dancer
- Ger Duany, actor, among Lost Boys of Sudan
- Natasha Joubert, South African entrepreneur, model and beauty pageant titleholder

=== Asia ===
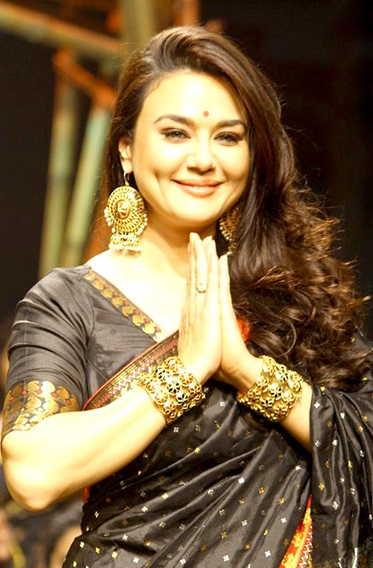
Preity Zinta

- Chelsea Fernandez, Filipino beauty pageant titleholder
- Rajesh Khanna, Bollywood actor
- Nadech Kugimiya, Thai model and actor
- I. M. Pei, Chinese-American architect
- Bianca Umali, Filipino Teen actress, commercial model and recurring dancer, orphaned at 7
- Preity Zinta, Indian film actress
- Tracy Perez, Filipino model, industrial engineer, and beauty pageant titleholder

=== Australia/Oceania ===
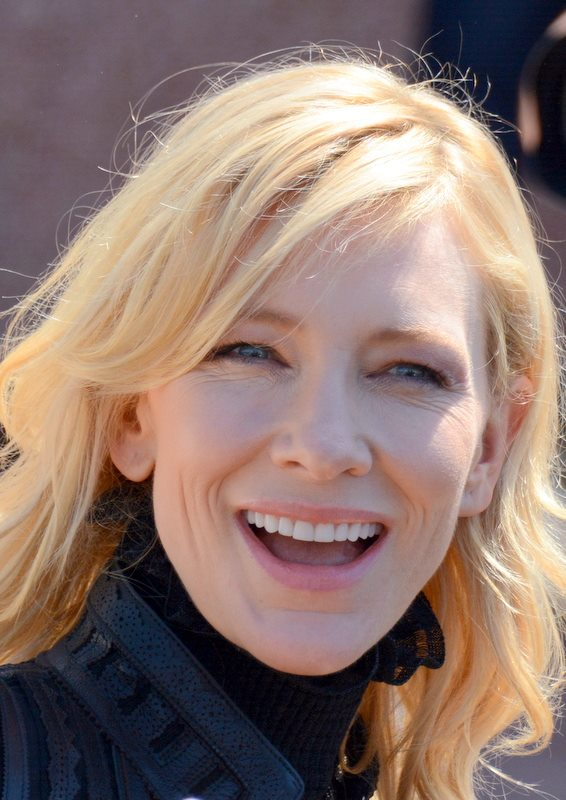
Cate Blanchett

- Cate Blanchett, Australian actress and theatre director
- Guy Pearce, Australian actor and musician

=== Europe ===
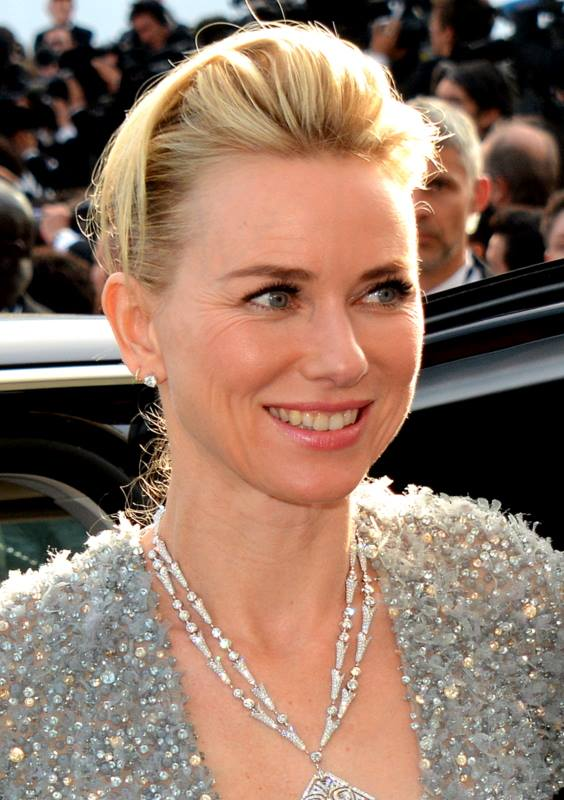
Naomi Watts

- Leon Battista Alberti, Italian humanist author, artist, architect, poet, priest, linguist, philosopher and cryptographer
- Max Beckmann, German painter, draftsman, printmaker, sculptor, and writer
- Ingrid Bergman, Swedish actress, orphaned at age 12
- Sarah Bernhardt born Henriette-Rosine Bernard; 22 October 1844 – 26 March 1923) was a French stage actress
- Roger Bissière, French artist. He designed stained glass windows for Metz cathedral and several other churches.
- Gustave Boulanger, French painter, abandoned at the age of 14
- Rosa Bonheur, French artist, an animalière (painter of animals) and sculptor
- Lord Byron, English peer, who was a poet and politician
- Caravaggio, Italian painter
- Charlie Chaplin, English entertainer
- Coco Chanel, French fashion designer and entrepreneur
- Jean Maurice Eugène Clément Cocteau, a French poet, playwright, novelist, designer, filmmaker, visual artist and critic.His father, a lawyer and amateur painter, committed suicide when Cocteau was nine.
- Salvador Dalí, Spanish surrealist painter
- Jacques-Louis David, was a French painter in the Neoclassical style, considered to be the preeminent painter of the era
- Daniel Day-Lewis, English actor
- Edgar Degas, French artist famous for his paintings, sculptures, prints, and drawings
- Eugène Delacroix, was a French Romantic artist regarded from the outset of his career as the leader of the French Romantic school
- Narcisse-Virgilio Díaz de la Peña, was a French painter of the Barbizon school
- Marlene Dietrich, German actress and singer
- Juliette Drouet, French actress, orphaned in childhood
- Anthony van Dyck, Flemish Baroque artist
- Albert Gustaf Aristides Edelfelt was a Finnish-Swedish painter noted for his naturalistic style and Realist approach to art. His father died while he was young.
- Barry Evans, English actor, abandoned as an infant, raised in an orphanage
- Caspar David Friedrich, German Romantic landscape painter
- Miloš Forman, Czech-American film director, screenwriter, actor, and professor who rose to fame in his native Czechoslovakia before immigrating to the US in 1968
- Greta Garbo, Swedish-born American film actress
- Paul Gauguin, French post-Impressionist artist
- Artemisia Gentileschi, Italian Baroque painter
- Anne-Louis Girodet de Roussy-Trioson also known as Anne-Louis Girodet-Trioson or simply Girodet was a French painter and pupil of Jacques-Louis David
- Francoise Hardy, French singer and songwriter
- André Heller, Austrian artist, author, poet, singer, songwriter and actor
- Alfred Hitchcock, English film director, producer, and screenwriter
- Hape Kerkeling, German actor, presenter and comedian
- Deborah Kerr, Scottish-born film, theatre and television actress
- Georg Wenzeslaus von Knobelsdorff, German painter and architect in Prussia
- Isaac Levitan, was a classical Russian landscape painter who advanced the genre of the "mood landscape"
- Adolf Loos, Austrian and Czechoslovak architect and influential European theorist of Modern architecture
- Peter Lorre, Austro-Hungarian-American actor
- Andrea Mantegna, Italian Renaissance painter
- Ian McKellen, English actor
- Michelangelo, Italian sculptor, painter, architect, poet, and engineer of the High Renaissance
- Molière, French playwright and actor who and one of the greatest masters of comedy in Western literature
- Lola Montez, Irish dancer and actress who became famous as a Spanish dancer, courtesan, and mistress of King Ludwig I of Bavaria
- Armin Mueller-Stahl, German film actor, painter and author
- Edvard Munch, Norwegian painter and printmaker
- Gabriele Münter, German expressionist painter
- Friederike Caroline Neuber, German actress and theatre director
- David Niven, English actor and novelist
- Edward Okuń, was a Polish Art Nouveau painter
- Laurence Olivier, English actor
- Parmigianino, Italian Mannerist painter and printmaker
- Francis Picabia, French avant-garde painter, poet and typographist
- Roman Polanski, French-Polish film director, producer, writer, and actor
- Oleg Popov, Russian clown and circus artist
- Neo Rauch, German painter
- Raphael, Italian painter and architect of the High Renaissance
- Alan Rickman, English actor and director
- Géza Röhrig, Hungarian actor and poet, raised in an orphanage
- Peter Paul Rubens, Flemish Baroque painter
- Heinz Rühmann, German film actor
- Margaret Rutherford, English actress
- Egon Schiele, Austrian painter
- Karl Friedrich Schinkel, Prussian architect, city planner, and painter
- Oskar Schlemmer, German painter, sculptor, designer and choreographer associated with the Bauhaus school
- Rudolf Schlichter, was a German painter, engraver and writer. He was one of the most important representatives of the critical-realistic style of verism
- Joseph Edward Southall, English painter associated with the Arts and Crafts movement.
- Nicolas de Staël, French painter of Russian origin known for his use of a thick impasto and his highly abstract landscape painting
- Guillaume Taraval, French-born Swedish painter
- Joaquín Torres-García, was a Uruguayan-Spanish artist
- Margarethe von Trotta, German film director
- Marie Tussaud, French artist known for her wax sculptures and Madame Tussauds
- Ellen von Unwerth, German photographer and director, specializing in erotic femininity
- Liv Ullmann, Norwegian actress and film director
- Lesser Ury, was a German Impressionist painter and printmaker, associated with the Düsseldorf school of painting
- Roger Vadim, French screenwriter, film director and producer, as well as an author, artist and occasional actor
- Gerardus "Geer" van Velde, was a Dutch painter
- Élisabeth Louise Vigée Le Brun, French painter
- Naomi Watts, English actress and film producer
- Stanisław Wyspiański, was a Polish playwright, painter and poet, as well as interior and furniture designer.
- Franco Zeffirelli, Italian director and producer of operas, films and television

=== North America ===
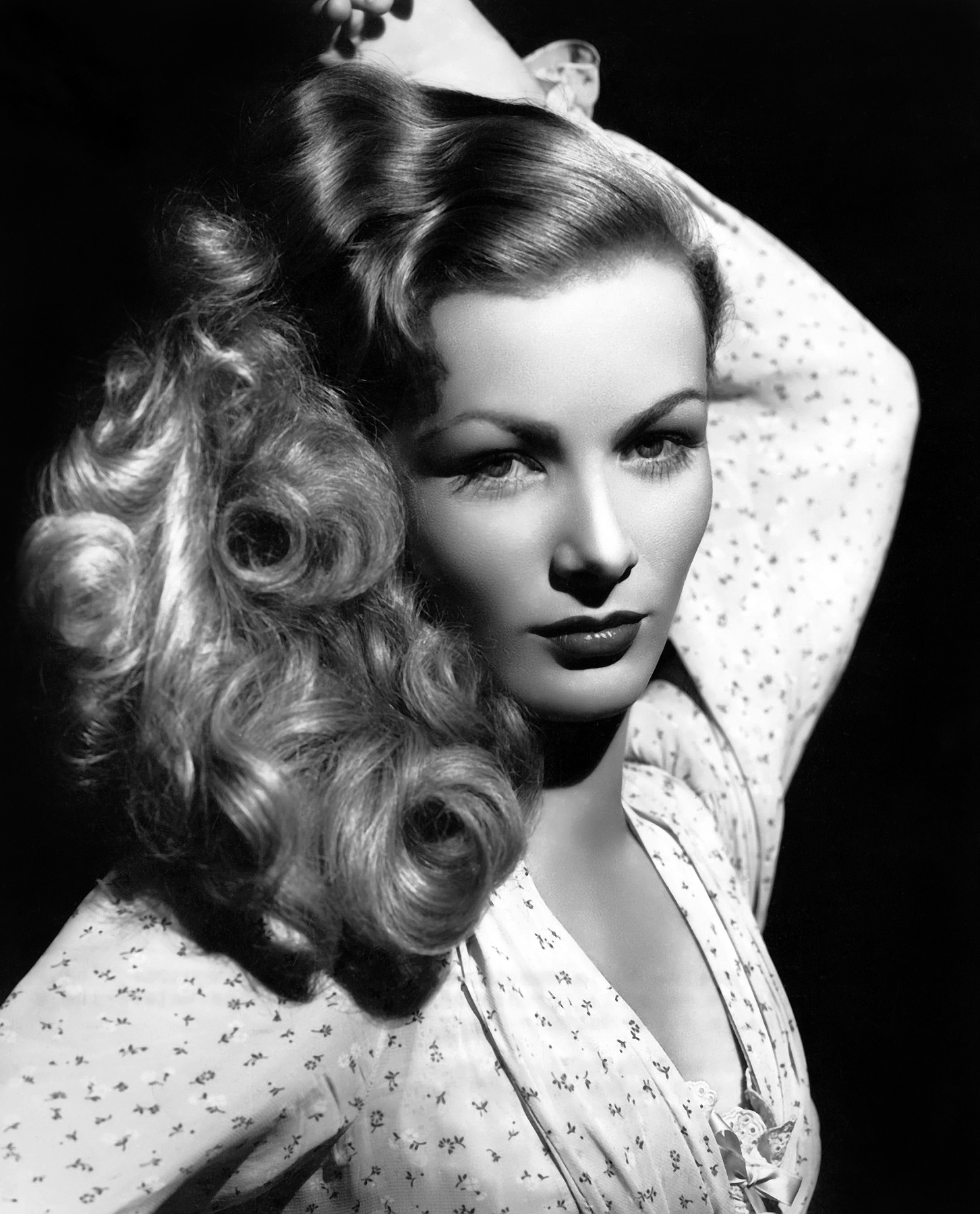
Veronica Lake

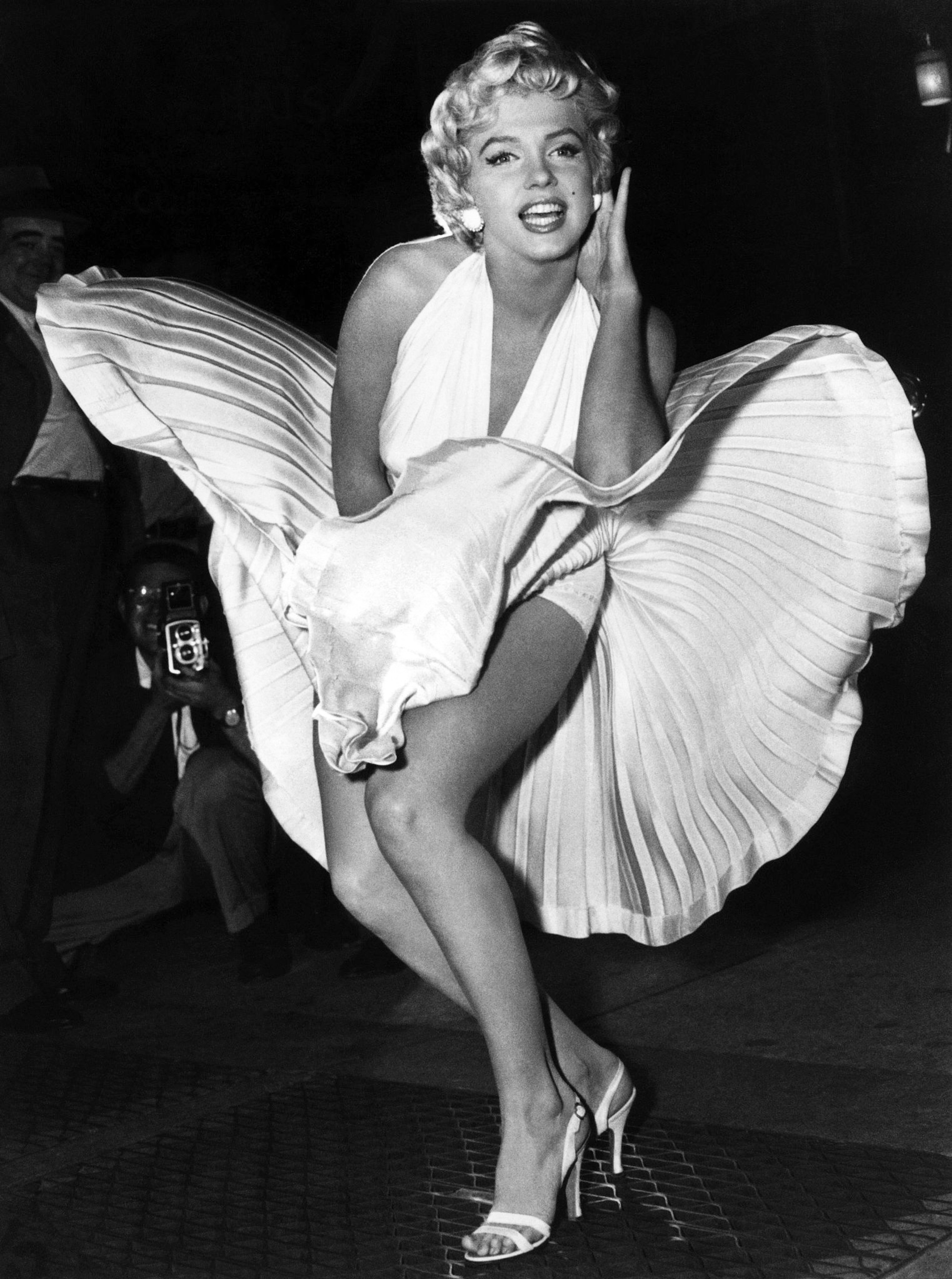
Marilyn Monroe

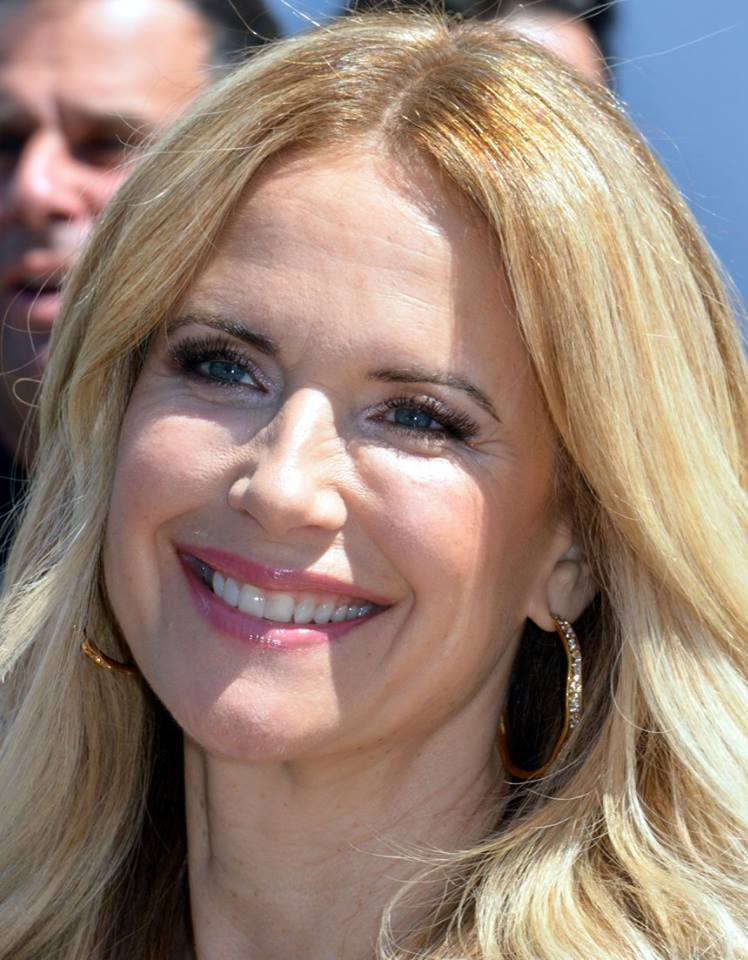
Kelly Preston

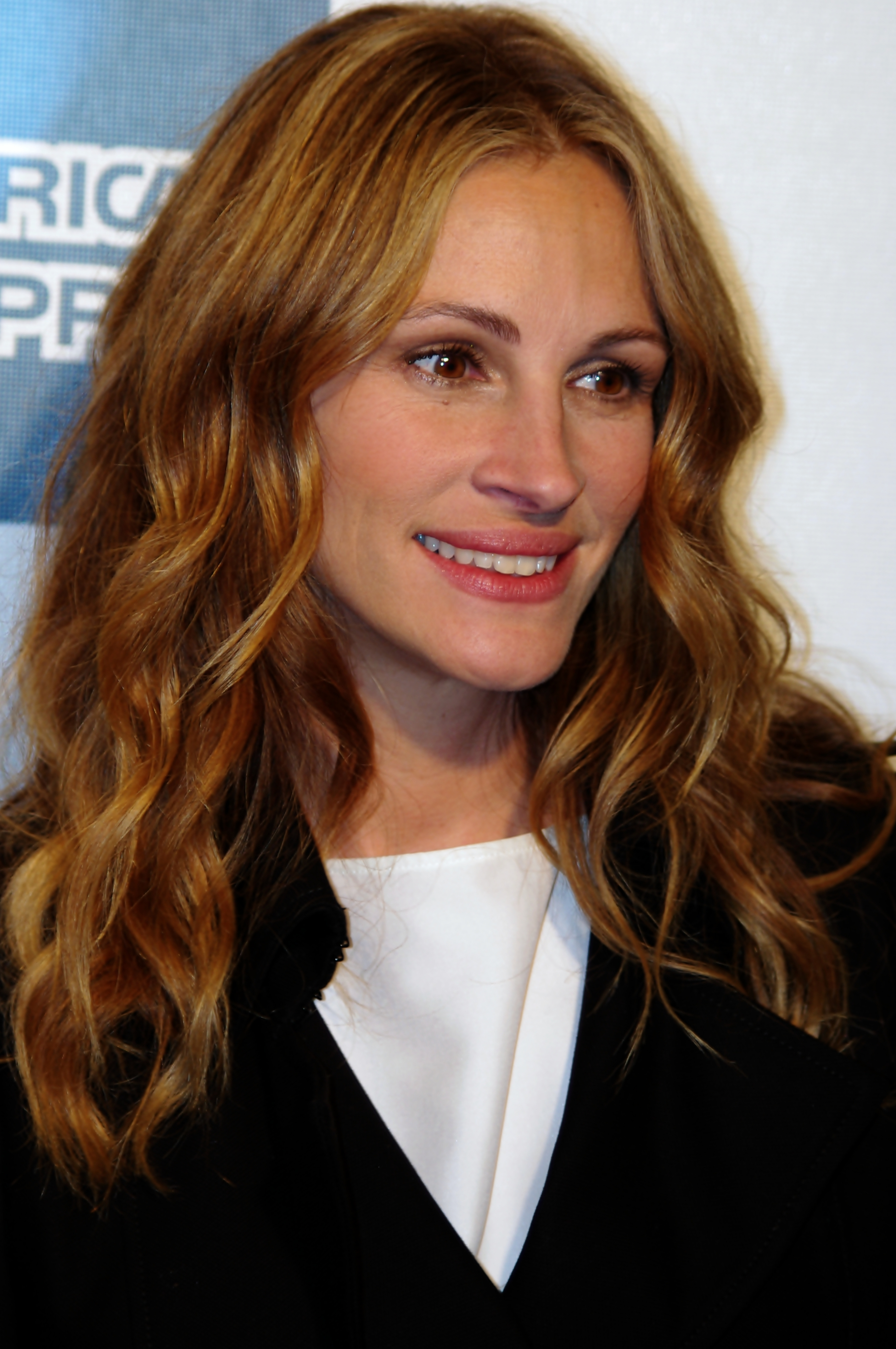
Julia Roberts

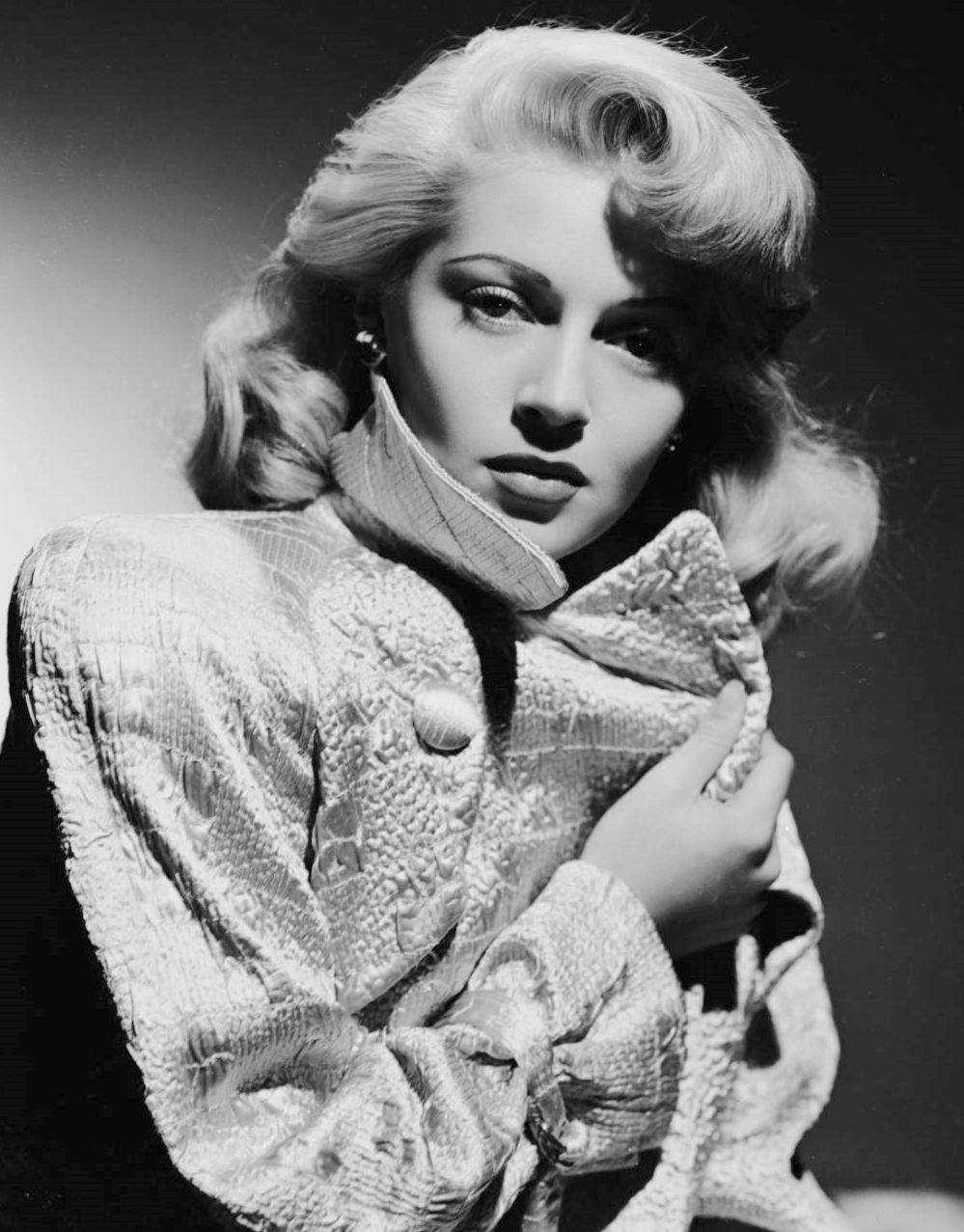
Lana Turner

- Tallulah Bankhead, American actress, orphaned as an infant
- Buffalo Bill, American frontier figure
- Charles Bronson, Lithuanian-American film and television actor
- Hazel Brooks, was an American actress.
- Carol Burnett, American actress, comedian, singer and writer, raised by her grandmother
- Mary Cassatt, American painter and printmaker
- William Castle, American film figure, orphaned at age 11
- Henry Darger, American writer and artist (whose work focused on orphans), orphaned at age 13.
- Tommy Davidson, American comedian, orphaned as infant
- James Dean, American actor
- Benicio del Toro, Puerto Rican actor
- Cecil B. DeMille, American filmmaker
- William C. DeMille, American screenwriter and director
- Jane Fonda, American actress, writer, political activist and fitness guru
- Peter Fonda, American actor, director, and screenwriter
- Clark Gable, American film actor, often referred to as "The King of Hollywood" or just simply as "The King"
- Ava Gardner, American actress and singer
- John Garfield, American actor
- Judy Garland, American actress, singer and vaudevillian
- Bill Graham, German-American impresario and rock concert promoter
- D. W. Griffith, American film director, writer, and producer
- Gene Hackman, American actor and novelist
- Oliver Hardy, American actor of Laurel and Hardy
- Mariska Hargitay, American actress
- Juano Hernandez, American actor
- Ice-T, American musician and actor, orphaned at age 13
- Brian Jungen, Dene-Zaa artist
- Danny Kaye, American actor, singer, dancer, comedian, and musician
- Alan Ladd (September 3, 1913 – January 29, 1964) was an American actor and film producer.
- Veronica Lake, American film, stage, and television actress
- Art Linkletter, Canadian-born American radio and television personality and entertainer, abandoned as an infant
- Ray Liotta, American actor, film producer and voice actor, adopted at 6 months
- George Lopez, American comedian, raised by a grandmother
- Myrna Loy, American film, television and stage actress
- Lee Majors, American film, television and voice actor, orphaned at age 2 & raised by aunt and uncle
- Jayne Mansfield, American actress in film, theatre, television and Playboy Playmates
- Jayne Marie Mansfield, Playboy nude model
- Frances McDormand, American actress, adopted as an infant
- Marilyn Monroe, entertainer, raised in foster care
- Eddie Murphy, American comedian, actor, writer, singer and producer
- Mary Pickford, Canadian-American film actress, writer, director, and producer
- Priscilla Presley, American actress and entrepreneur
- Kelly Preston, American actress
- Anthony Quinn, Mexican-born American actor, painter and writer
- Julia Roberts, American actress and producer
- Jane Russell, American film actress and one of Hollywood's leading sex symbols
- Gene Siskel, American film critic, orphaned at age 9 & raised by aunt and uncle
- Barbara Stanwyck, American actress, raised in foster homes from age 2
- Barbra Streisand, American singer, songwriter, actress, and filmmaker
- Lana Turner, American actress
- Andy Warhol, American artist who was a leading figure in the visual art movement known as pop art
- Orson Welles, American actor and director, orphaned at age 15
- Jeffrey Wright is an American actor whose father died when he was a child
- Darryl F. Zanuck, American film producer, abandoned at age 13

=== South America ===
- Ivian Sarcos, Miss World 2011, orphaned at age 8

== Athletes ==
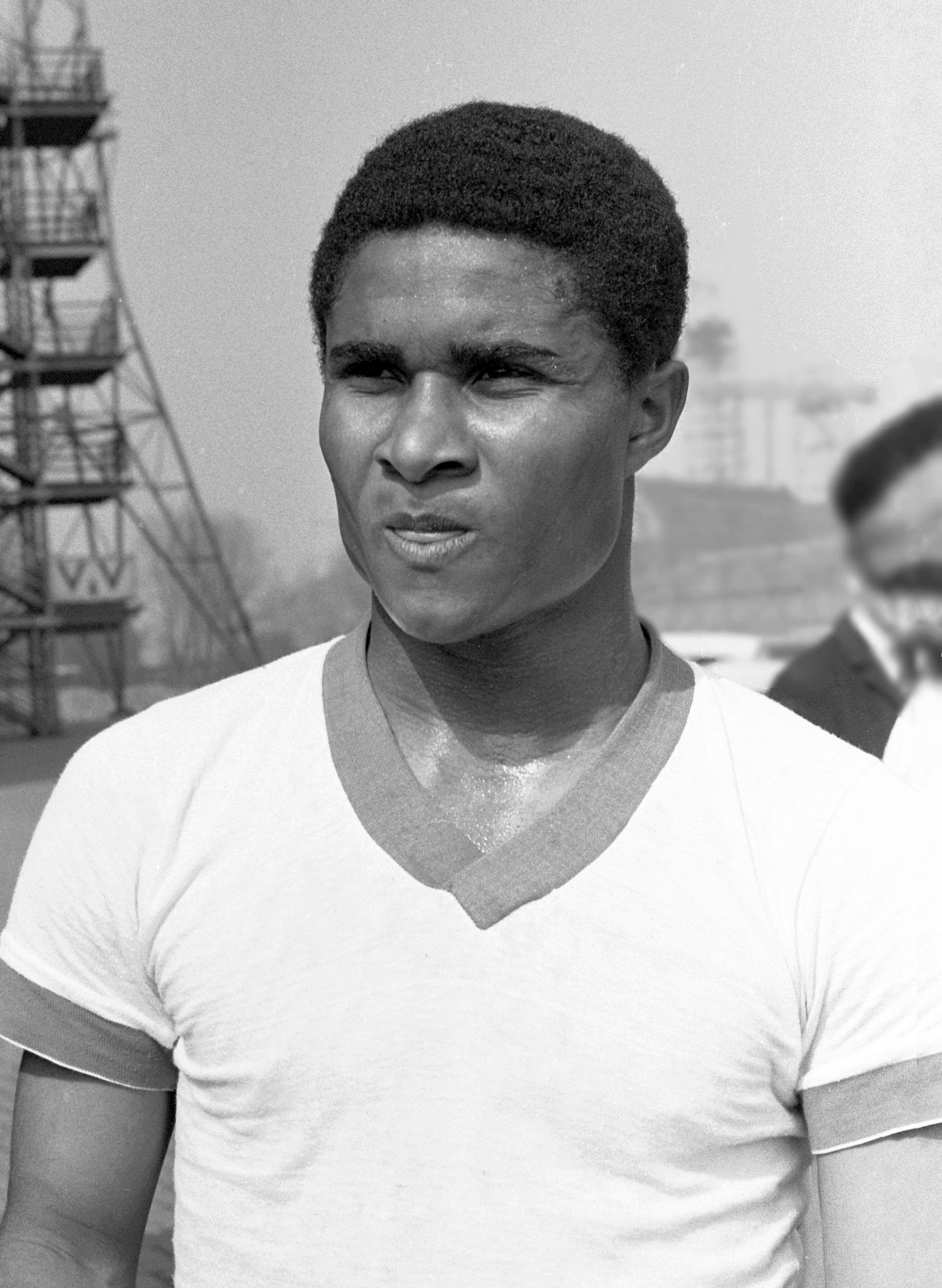
Eusebio

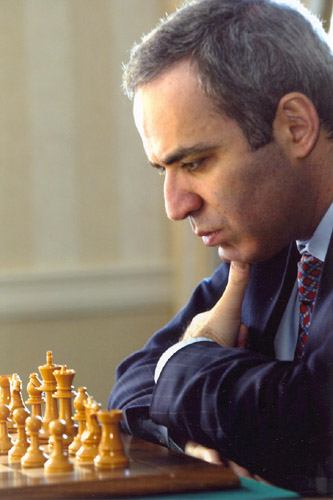
Garry Kasparov

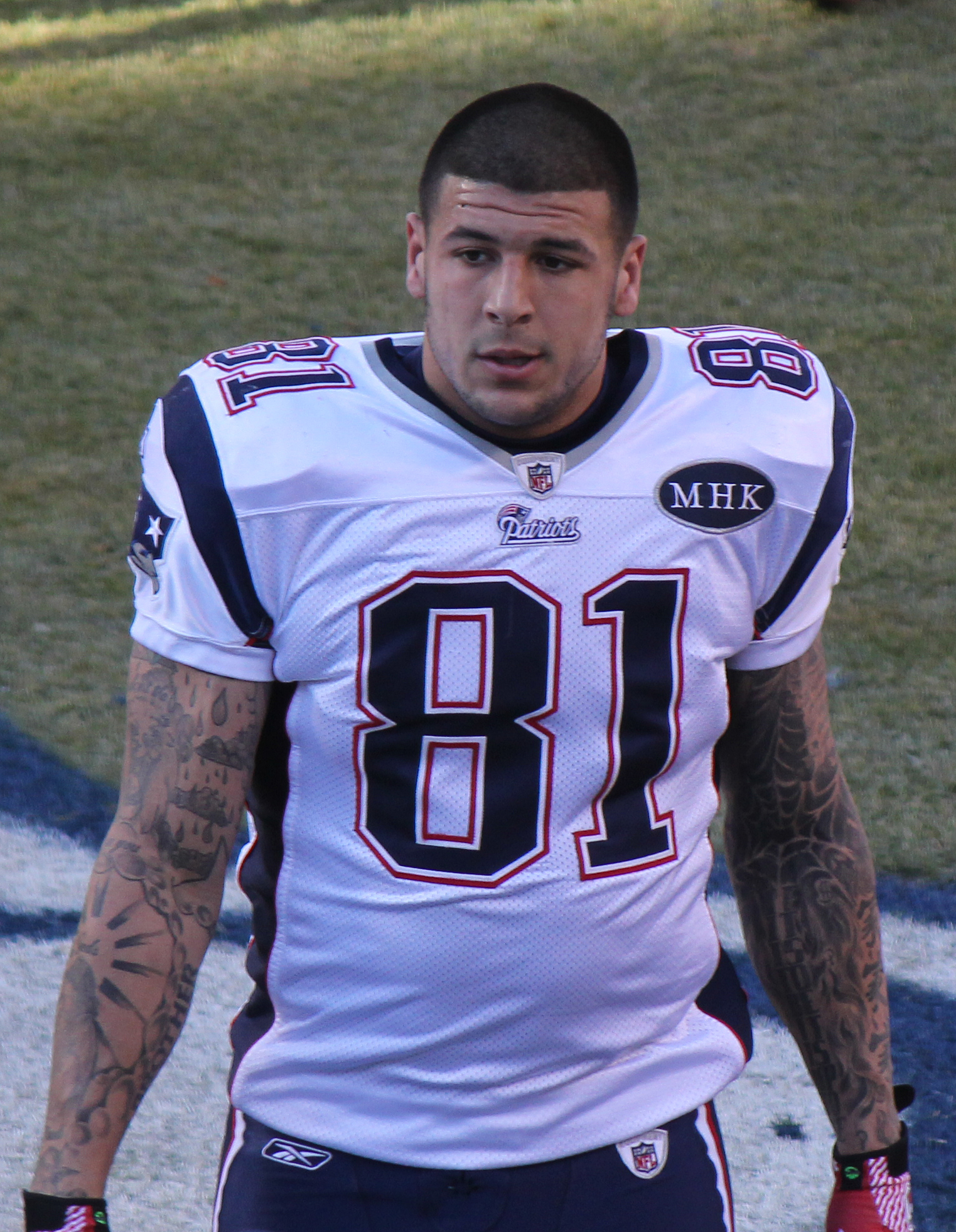
Aaron Hernandez

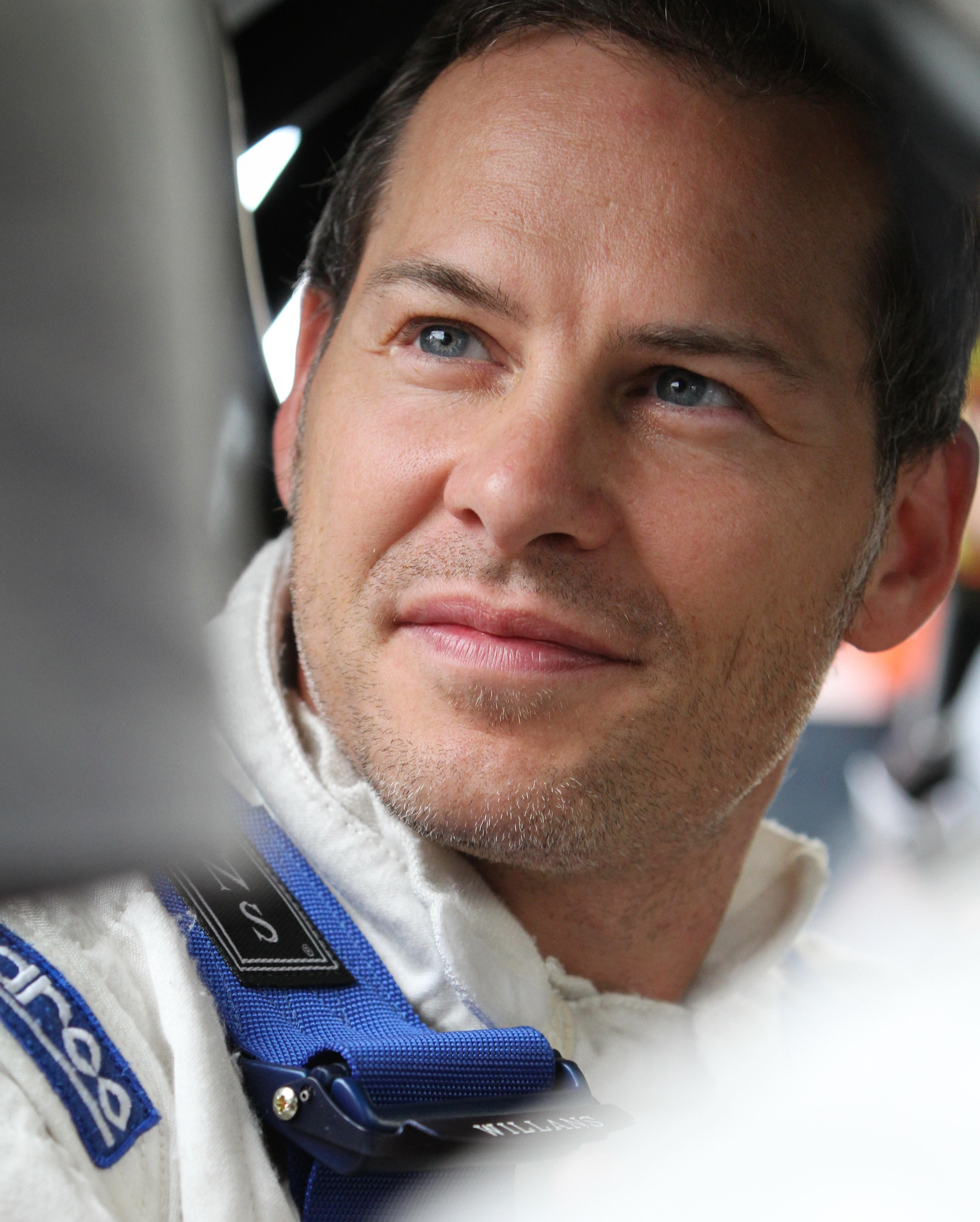
Jacques Villeneuve

=== Africa ===
- Eusébio, Portuguese footballer who played as a striker and first world-class African-born players
- Guor Marial, Olympic runner, one of the Lost Boys of Sudan
- Victor Moses, professional footballer
- Emmanuel Ofosu Yeboah, African triathlete and advocate for the rights of the disabled

=== Asia ===
- Garry Kasparov, Russian chess grandmaster, former World Chess Champion
- Iftikhar Ali Khan Pataudi, captain of the India national cricket team for the tour to England in 1946
- Mansoor Ali Khan Pataudi, Indian cricketer and former captain of the Indian cricket team
- Greysia Polii, former Indonesian badminton player
- Milkha Singh, known as The Flying Sikh, is an Indian former track and field sprinter

=== Australia/Oceania ===
- Layne Beachley, Australian surfer, she won the World Championship
- Jason Day, Australian professional golfer and PGA Tour member
- Jack Lovelock, New Zealand athlete, and the 1936 Olympic champion
- Wendell Sailor, Australian former professional rugby football player

=== Europe ===
- Alberto Ascari, Italian racing driver and twice Formula One World Champion
- Oksana Baiul, Ukrainian former competitive figure skater, World and Olympic champion
- Franco Baresi, Italian professional football player and coach
- Johan Cruyff, Dutch professional football player and coach
- Moritz Fürste, German field hockey player, Olympic champion 2008 and 2012
- Sepp Herberger, German football player and manager of the West German national team which won the 1954 FIFA World Cup final
- James Mason, Irish-born chess player, journalist and writer
- Declan McCormick, English Junior and British Youth Weightlifting Champion
- Paavo Nurmi, Finnish middle- and long-distance runner
- Jochen Rindt, racing driver, the only driver to posthumously win the Formula One
- Daley Thompson, English former decathlete, Olympic, World- and European champion
- Walter Tull, English professional footballer and British Army officer of Afro-Caribbean descent

=== North America ===
- Simone Biles, American Olympic gymnast, adopted by her grandparents
- Steve Van Buren, professional American football halfback
- Nicholas Delpopolo, American judoka
- Édouard Fabre, Canadian marathon runner
- Scott Hamilton, figure skater, adopted as an infant
- Aaron Hernandez, American football tight end and convicted murderer
- Morgan Hurd, American gymnast, adopted as an infant
- Carlin Isles, American rugby star, adopted at age 8
- Colin Kaepernick, American civil rights activist and American football quarterback
- Kevin Levrone. American IFBB pro bodybuilder & Mr Olympia competitor
- Lopez Lomong, U.S. Olympic track star, one of the Lost Boys of Sudan
- Greg Louganis, American Olympic diver, adopted as an infant
- Karl Malone, American basketball player
- Billy Mills, American Olympic runner, orphaned at age 12
- Babe Ruth, American baseball star, raised in an orphanage
- Gunboat Smith, Irish-American Boxer, grew up in orphanages around the Philadelphia area
- Jim Thorpe, American multi-sport Olympic and professional athlete, orphaned as a teen
- Mike Tyson, American boxing heavyweight champion, adopted at age 16
- Jacques Villeneuve, Canadian professional auto racing driver

=== South America ===
- Gustavo Kuerten, tennis player from Brazil, nickname as Guga, is a retired World No. 1
- Rivaldo, Brazilian former professional footballer

== Scientists and scholars ==
=== Africa ===
- Maud Chifamba, the youngest university student in Africa, orphaned at age 14
- Ibn Khaldun, North African Arab historiographer and historian lost both of his parents aged 17

=== Europe ===
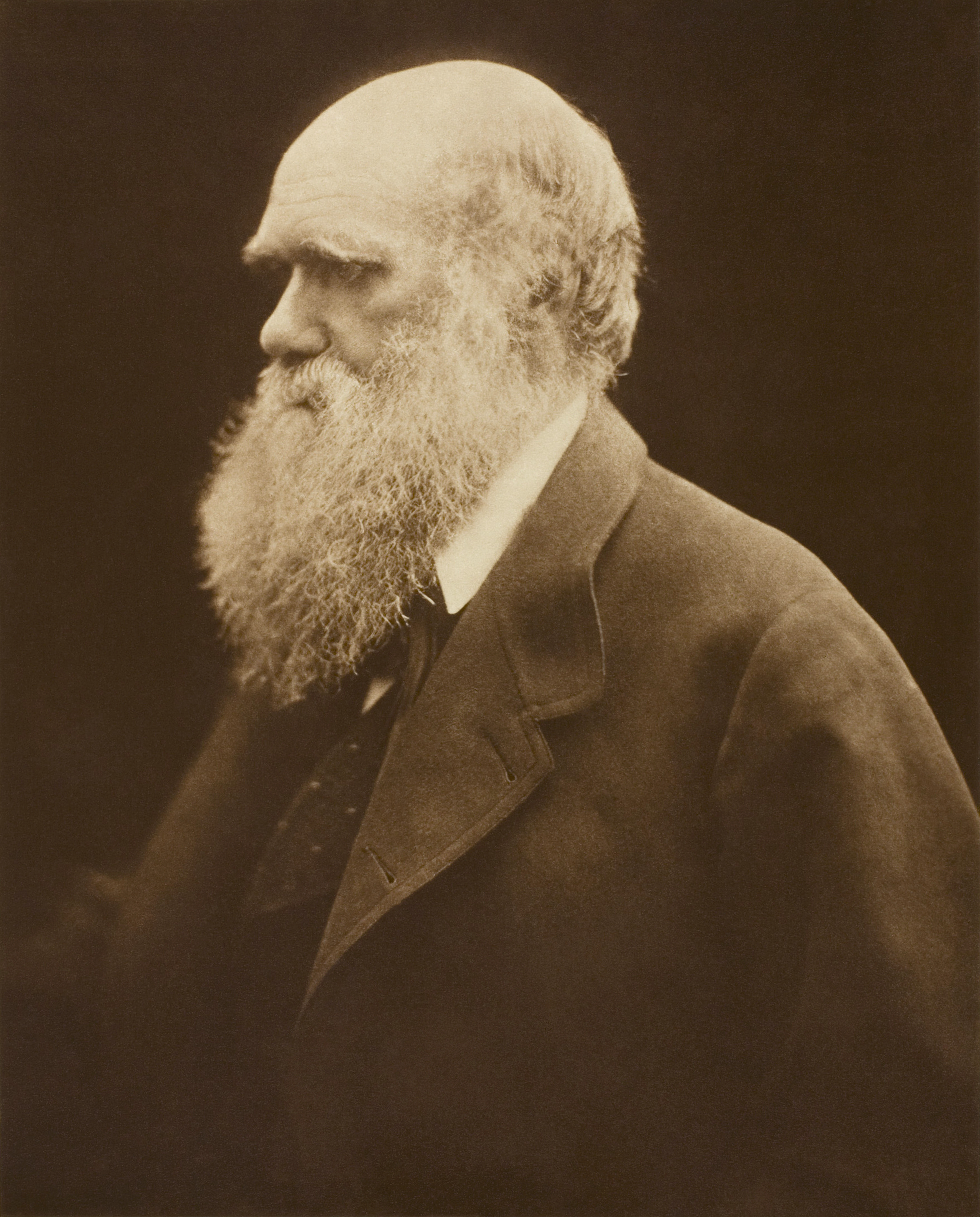
Charles Darwin

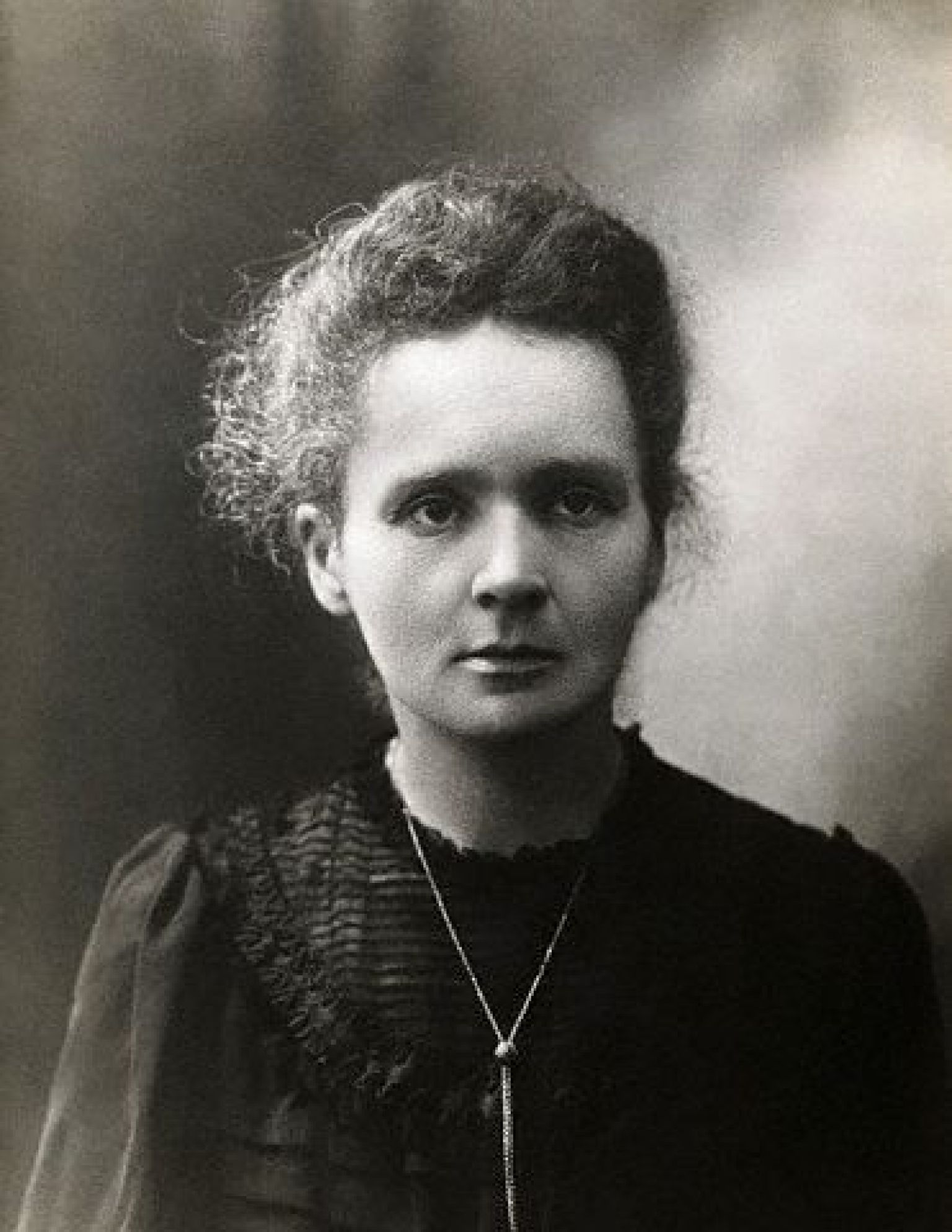
Marie Curie

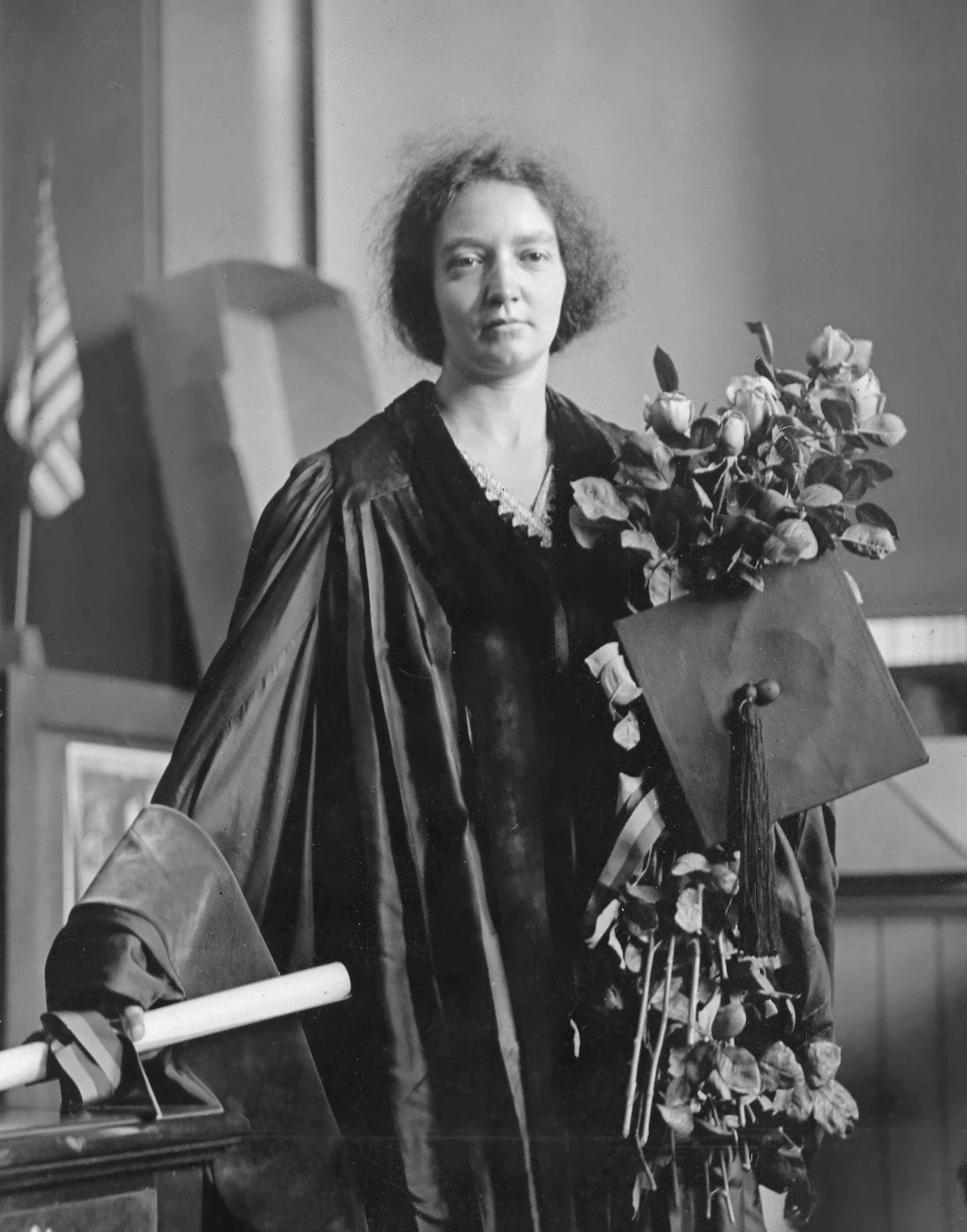
Irène Joliot-Curie

- Jean le Rond d'Alembert, French mathematician, abandoned as an infant
- Lou Andreas-Salomé, Russian-born psychoanalyst and a well-traveled author, narrator, and essayist
- Jöns Jacob Berzelius, Swedish chemist and one of the founders of modern chemistry
- Elizabeth Blackwell, British-born physician
- Sabina Baldoncelli, Italian pharmacist
- Ludwig Boltzmann, Austrian physicist and philosopher
- Robert Boyle, Anglo-Irish natural philosopher, chemist, physicist and inventor
- Henry Cavendish, British natural philosopher, scientist, and an important experimental and theoretical chemist and physicist
- Nicolaus Copernicus, Polish Renaissance mathematician and astronomer
- Benedetto Croce, Italian idealist philosopher, historian and politician
- Marie Curie, Polish and naturalized-French physicist and chemist who conducted pioneering research on radioactivity, the first woman to win a Nobel Prize, and the only one to win two.
- Charles Darwin, English naturalist, geologist and biologist
- René Descartes, French philosopher and polymath
- Arthur Eddington, English astronomer, physicist, and mathematician
- Willem Einthoven, Dutch doctor, physiologist and received the Nobel Prize in Physiology or Medicine
- Lodovico Ferrari, Italian mathematician
- Alexander Fleming, Scottish biologist, pharmacologist and botanist
- Joseph von Fraunhofer, German optician
- Hans-Georg Gadamer, German philosopher of the continental tradition
- Fritz Haber, German chemist who received the Nobel Prize in Chemistry
- Georg Wilhelm Friedrich Hegel, German philosopher and an important figure of German idealism
- Alexander von Humboldt, Prussian polymath
- Wilhelm von Humboldt, Prussian philosopher and public figure
- David Hume, Scottish philosopher, historian, economist, and essayist
- James Hutton, Scottish geologist, physician, chemical manufacturer, naturalist, and experimental agriculturalist
- Edward Jenner, English physician and scientist, who was the pioneer of smallpox vaccine, the world's first vaccine
- Irène Joliot-Curie, French scientist second woman to win a Nobel Prize
- Immanuel Kant, German philosopher who is considered the central figure of modern philosophy
- Johannes Kepler, German scientist, raised by grandmother
- Antoine Lavoisier, French chemist and father of modern chemistry
- Antonie van Leeuwenhoek, Dutch tradesman and scientist
- Gottfried Wilhelm Leibniz, German polymath and philosopher
- Hendrik Lorentz, Dutch physicist, who shared the Nobel Prize in Physics
- Ada Lovelace, English mathematician and writer, chiefly known for her work on Charles Babbage's early mechanical general-purpose computer, the Analytical Engine
- James Clerk Maxwell, Scottish scientist in the field of mathematical physics
- John McDouall Stuart, Scottish explorer and one of the most accomplished of all Australia's inland explorers
- Dmitri Mendeleev, Russian chemist and inventor
- Gerardus Mercator, Geographer, cosmographer and cartographer
- Maria Sibylla Merian, German-born naturalist and scientific illustrator
- Gustav Nachtigal, German explorer of Central and West Africa
- Isaac Newton, English physicist and mathematician

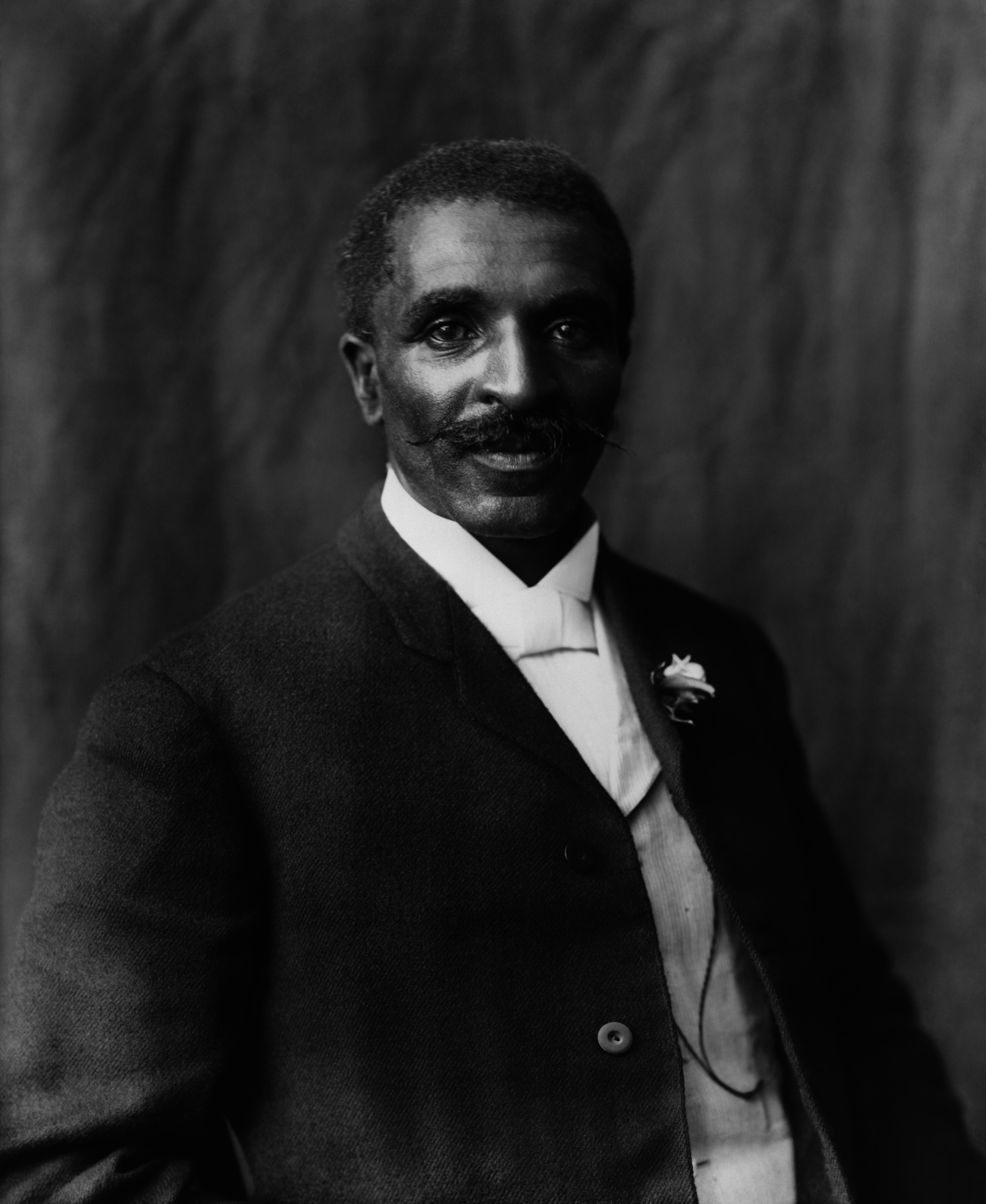
George Washington Carver

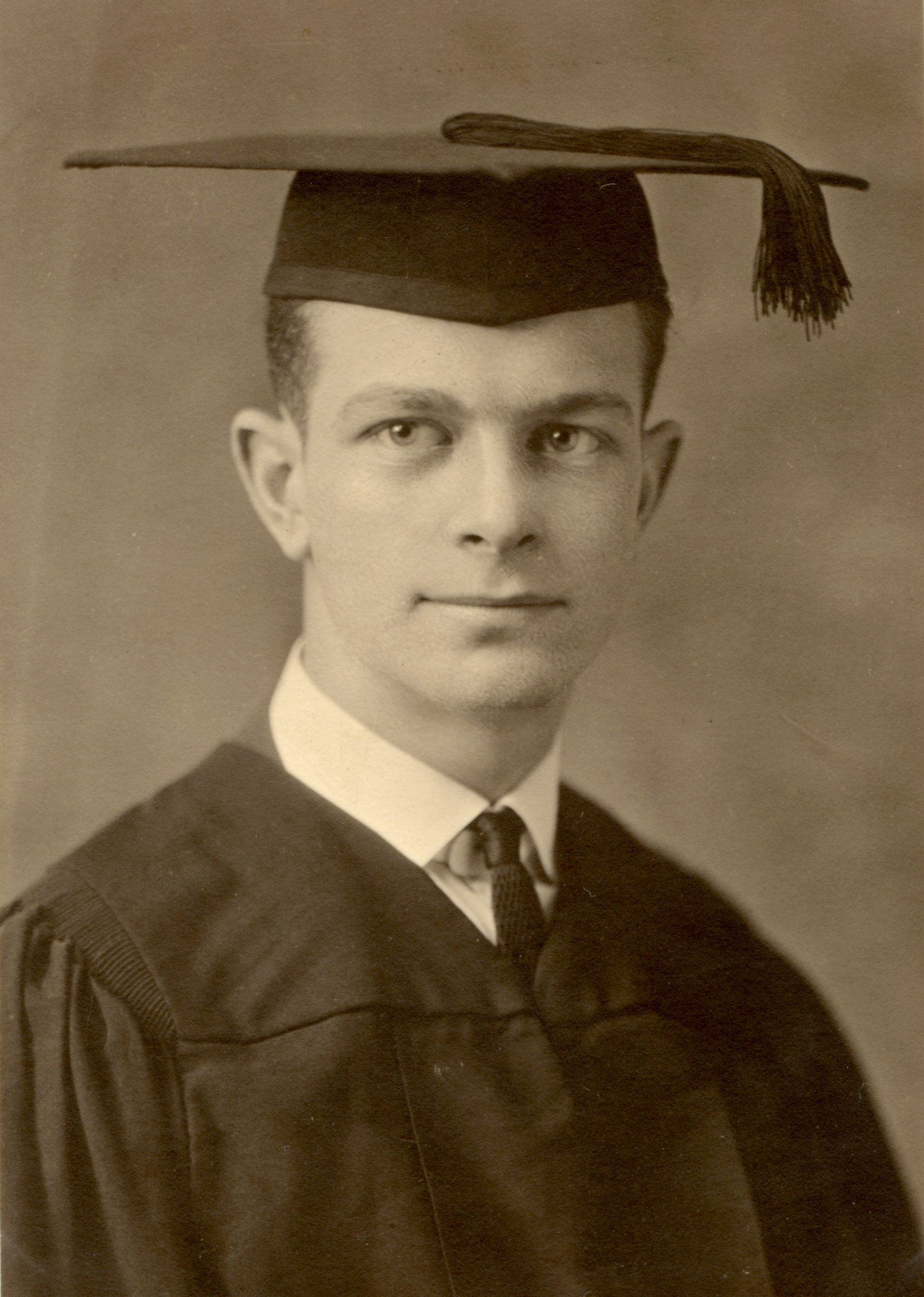
Linus Pauling

- Friedrich Nietzsche, German philosopher, writer, and linguist
- Richard Owen, English biologist, comparative anatomist and paleontologist
- Blaise Pascal, French mathematician, physicist, inventor, writer and Christian philosopher
- André Patry, French astronomer and discoverer of 9 minor planets in the late 1930s
- Emmi Pikler, Hungarian pediatrician and infant-education theorist
- Paul Ricœur, French philosopher, for combining phenomenological description with hermeneutics
- Jean-Jacques Rousseau, French philosopher, raised by aunt and uncle
- Arthur Rudolph, German rocket engineer
- Bertrand Russell, British philosopher, orphaned at age 3
- Jean-Paul Sartre, French philosopher, writer, and activist
- Arthur Schopenhauer, German philosopher
- Georg Simmel, German sociologist, philosopher, and critic
- Adam Smith, Scottish moral philosopher and pioneer of political economy
- Baruch Spinoza, Dutch philosopher of Sephardi/Portuguese origin
- Voltaire, French Enlightenment writer, historian and philosopher
- Wilhelm Wundt, German physician, physiologist, philosopher, and professor

=== North America ===
- John Bardeen, American physicist and electrical engineer
- George Washington Carver, American scientist, inventor, orphaned while a slave
- Stephanie Kwolek, American chemist
- Linus Pauling, American chemist, biochemist, peace activist, author, and educator
- Percy Spencer, American inventor, orphaned in childhood
- Robert Taylor, American internet pioneer, adopted at age 28 days
- Blake R. Van Leer, President of Georgia Tech, engineer and United States Army officer

== Business people ==
=== Asia ===
- Ian Karan, Tamil German businessman and politician

=== Europe ===
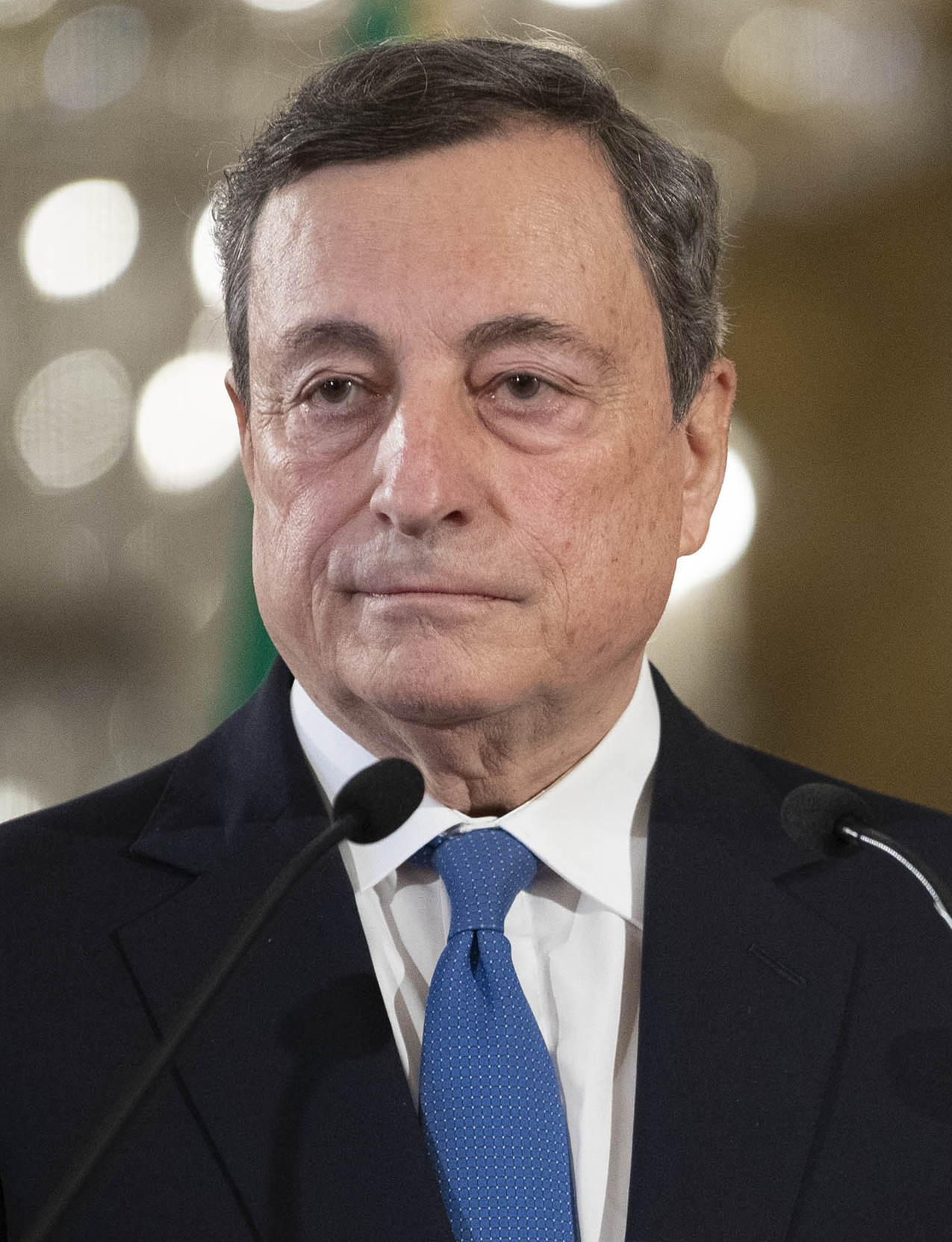
Mario Draghi

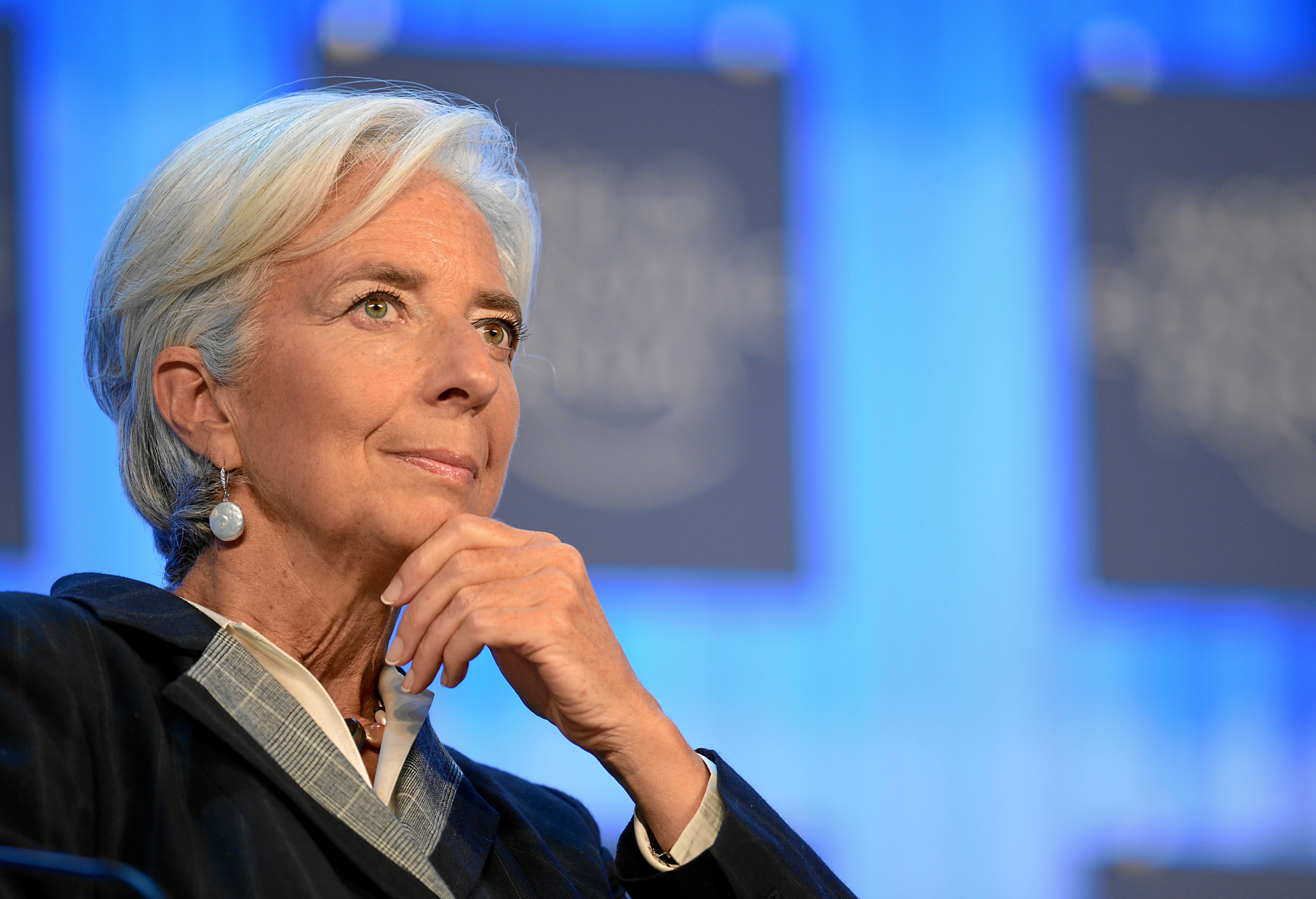
Christine Lagarde

- Roman Abramovich, Russian businessman and politician
- Gianni Agnelli, Italian industrialist and principal shareholder of Fiat
- Anthony Bacon, British iron pioneer
- Karl Benz, German engine designer and automobile engineer
- André Citroën, French industrialist and freemason
- Thomas Cook, English founded the travel agency Thomas Cook & Son
- Mario Draghi, Italian economist and central banker who served as President of the European Central Bank
- Jakob Fugger, German major merchant, mining entrepreneur and banker of Europe
- Alfred Krupp, German steel manufacturer and inventor, nickname "The Cannon King"
- Christine Lagarde, French Managing Director (MD) of the International Monetary Fund
- Wilhelm Maybach, German engine designer and industrialist
- Rudolf August Oetker, German entrepreneur
- Aristotle Onassis, Greek shipping magnate
- Mary Portas, English retail consultant, and broadcaster, orphaned at age 18
- Vidal Sassoon, British beauty products magnate, placed in an orphanage at age 7
- Hugo Stinnes, German industrialist
- Hans Wilsdorf, German-born British founder of noted watch brands Rolex and Tudor
- Ferdinand von Zeppelin, German general and aircraft manufacturer

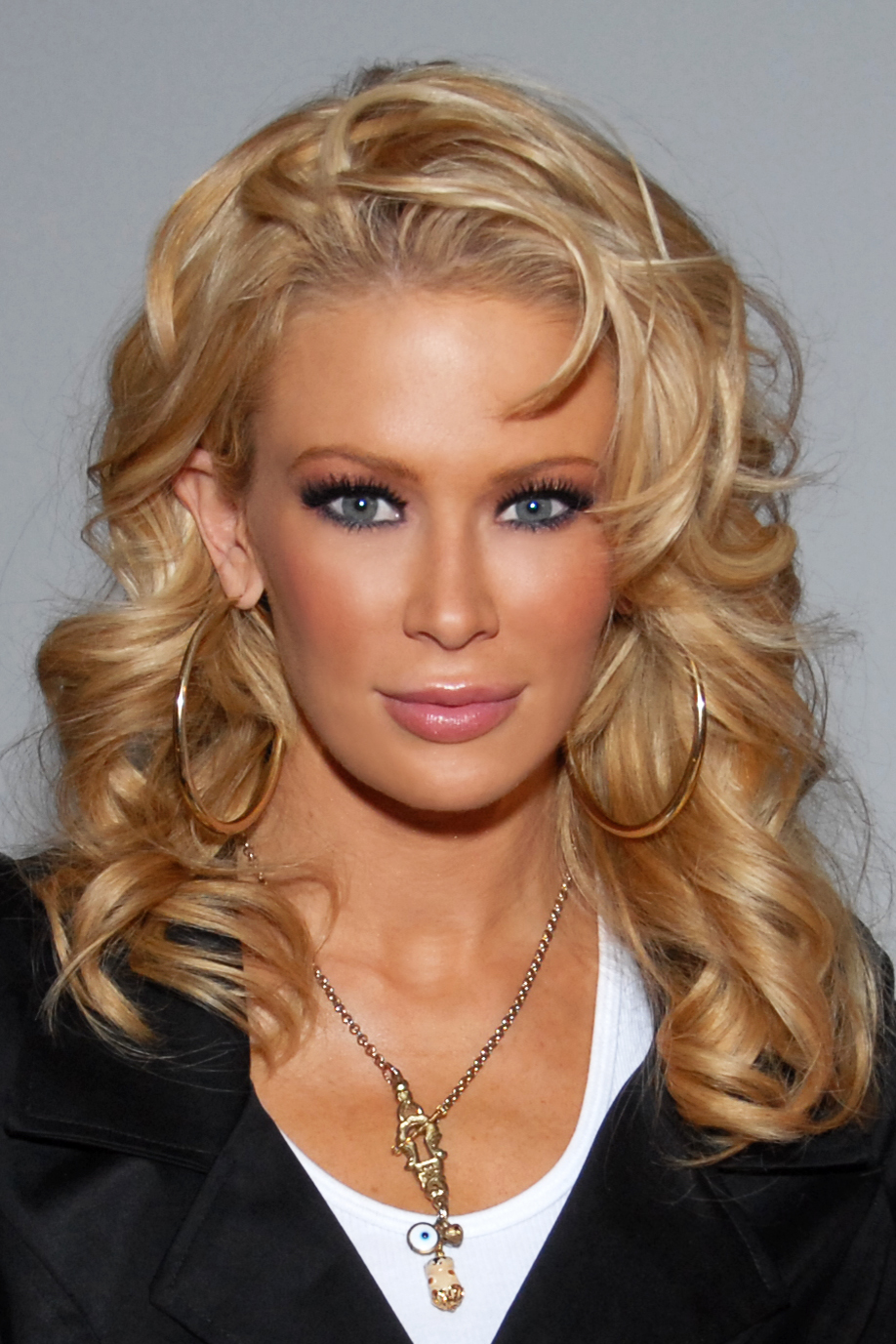
Jenna Jameson

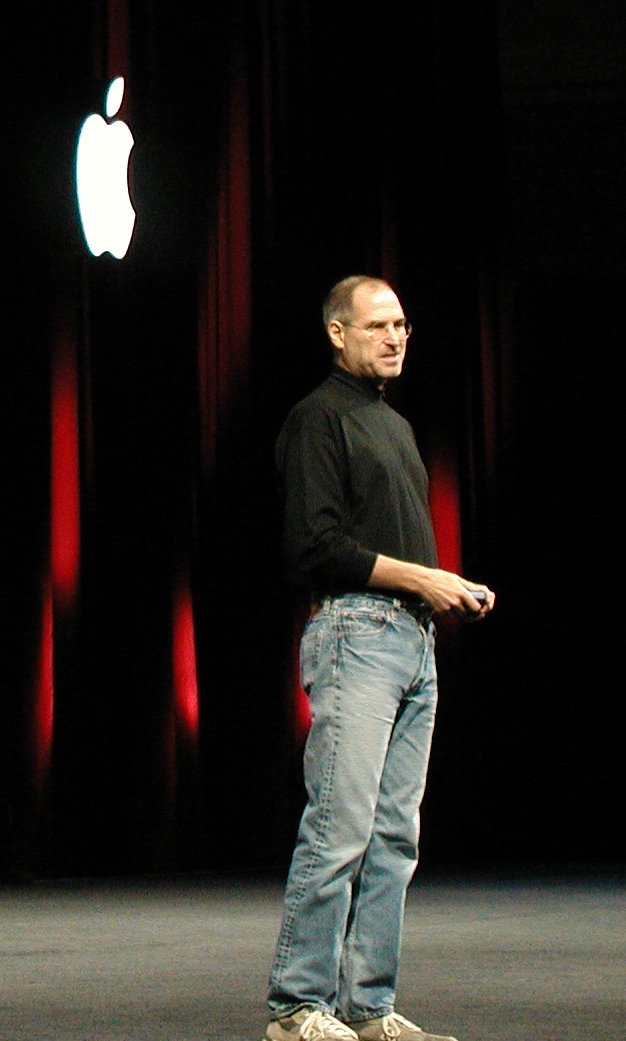
Steve Jobs

=== North America ===
- Arthur E. Andersen, American accounting firm founder, orphaned as a teen
- L.L. Bean, American retail catalog magnate, orphaned at age 12
- William Boeing, American aviation pioneer who founded The Boeing Company
- Adolph Coors, German American brewer who founded the Adolph Coors Company
- August Duesenberg and Fred Duesenberg, German-born American automobile pioneers, designers, manufacturers and sportsmen
- Henry Ford, American founder of Ford Motor Company
- Samuel Goldwyn, American film mogul, raised by relatives
- John Hancock, American merchant, statesman and prominent Patriot of the American Revolution
- Howard Hughes, American entrepreneur
- Jenna Jameson, American entrepreneur, webcam model and former pornographic film actress
- Steve Jobs, American Apple Computer founder, adopted as infant
- Howard Lutnick, American CEO of Cantor Fitzgerald, orphaned as a teen
- John Molson, 18th century Canadian brewer
- Tom Monaghan, American Domino's Pizza founder, partially raised in an orphanage
- Colonel Sanders, American businessman, founder of Kentucky Fried Chicken
- Carlos Slim, Mexican business magnate, investor, and philanthropist
- Henry E. Steinway, German-American piano maker
- Levi Strauss, American Jewish businessman
- Dave Thomas, American Wendy's entrepreneur adoption advocate, adopted as an infant
- Madam C. J. Walker, American entrepreneur, philanthropist, and political and social activist
- Jerry Yang, Taiwanese American Internet entrepreneur and programmer

== Otherwise notables ==
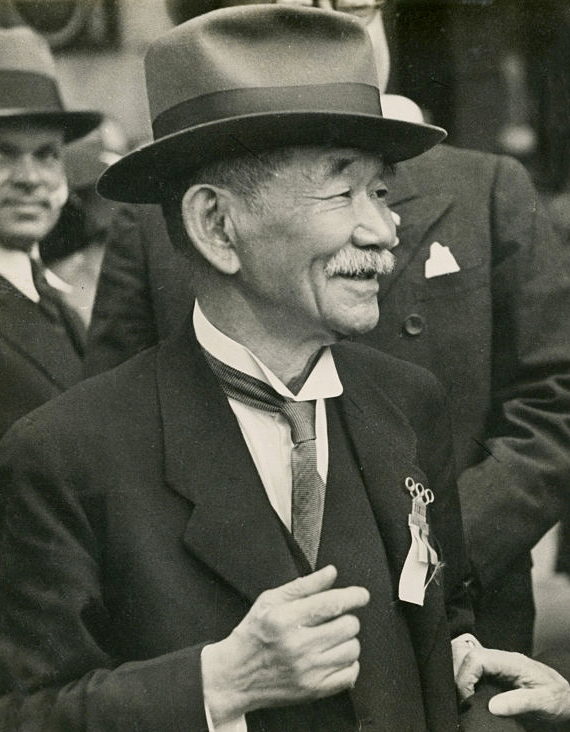
Kanō Jigorō

=== Asia ===
- Kanō Jigorō, Japanese educator and athlete, the founder of Judo
- Oda Nobunaga, powerful daimyō of Japan
- Swami Rama, Indian yógī
- Natalya Stroeva, Russian model and beauty pageant titleholder
- Kazuo Taoka, one of the most prominent yakuza godfathers
- Minamoto no Yoshitomo, head of the Minamoto clan and a general of Japanese history
- Minamoto no Yoshitsune, nobleman and military commander of the Minamoto clan of Japan
- Lu Yu, ancient author of The Classic of Tea
- Osama bin Laden, founder of al-Qaeda

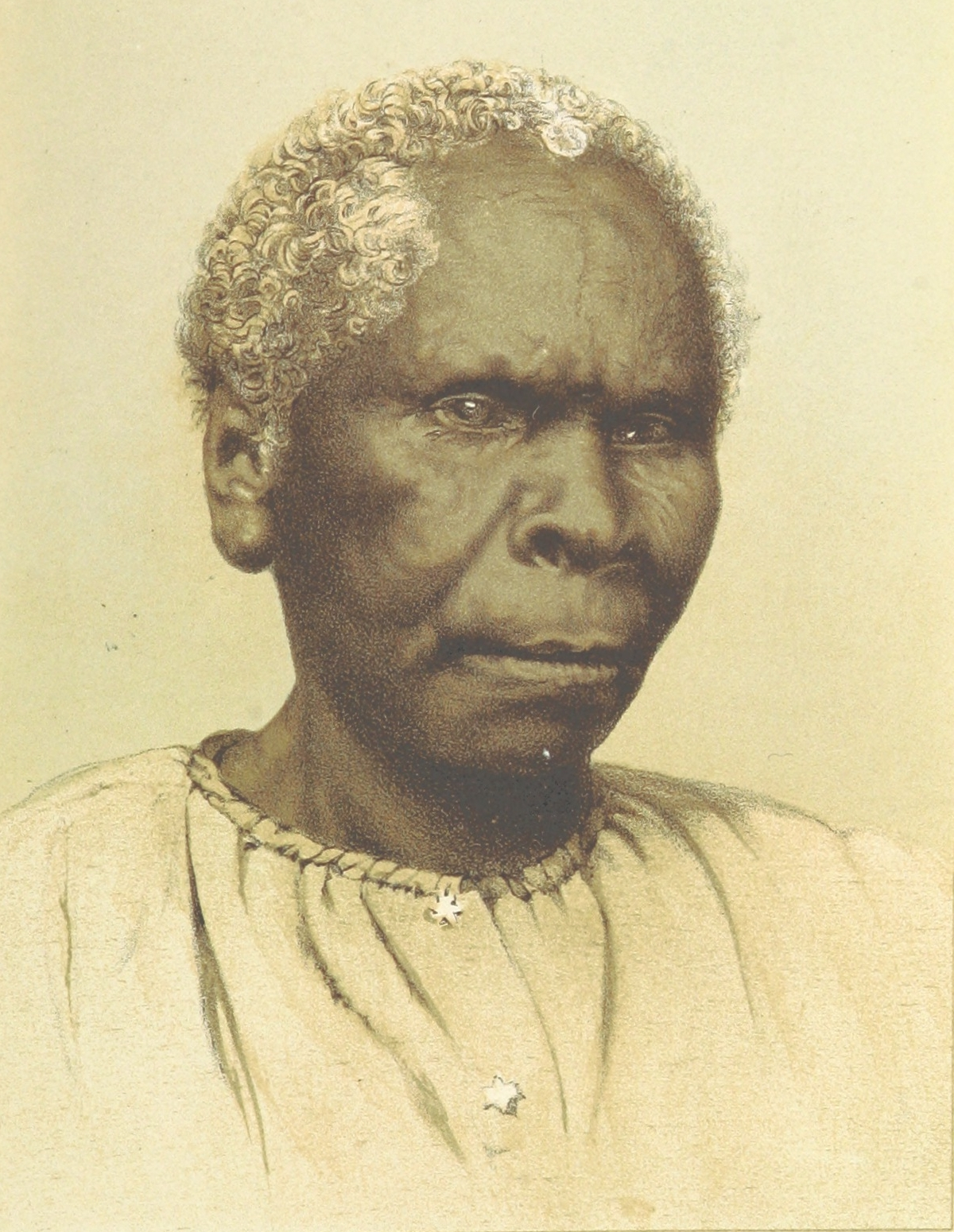
Truganini

=== Australia/Oceania ===
- Truganini, Aboriginal Tasmanian
- Archibald Shaw, Catholic priest and radio pioneer

=== Europe ===
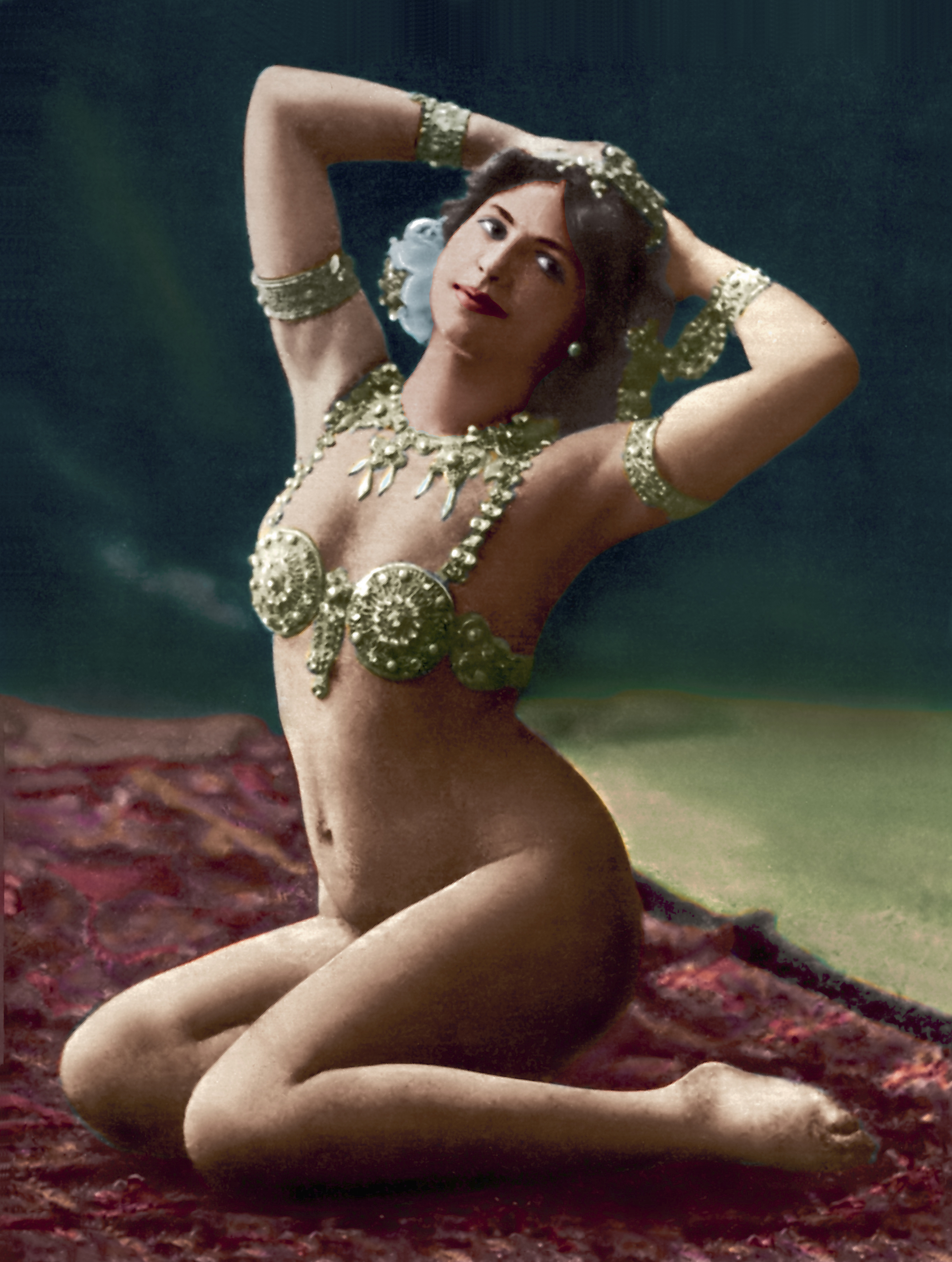
Mata Hari

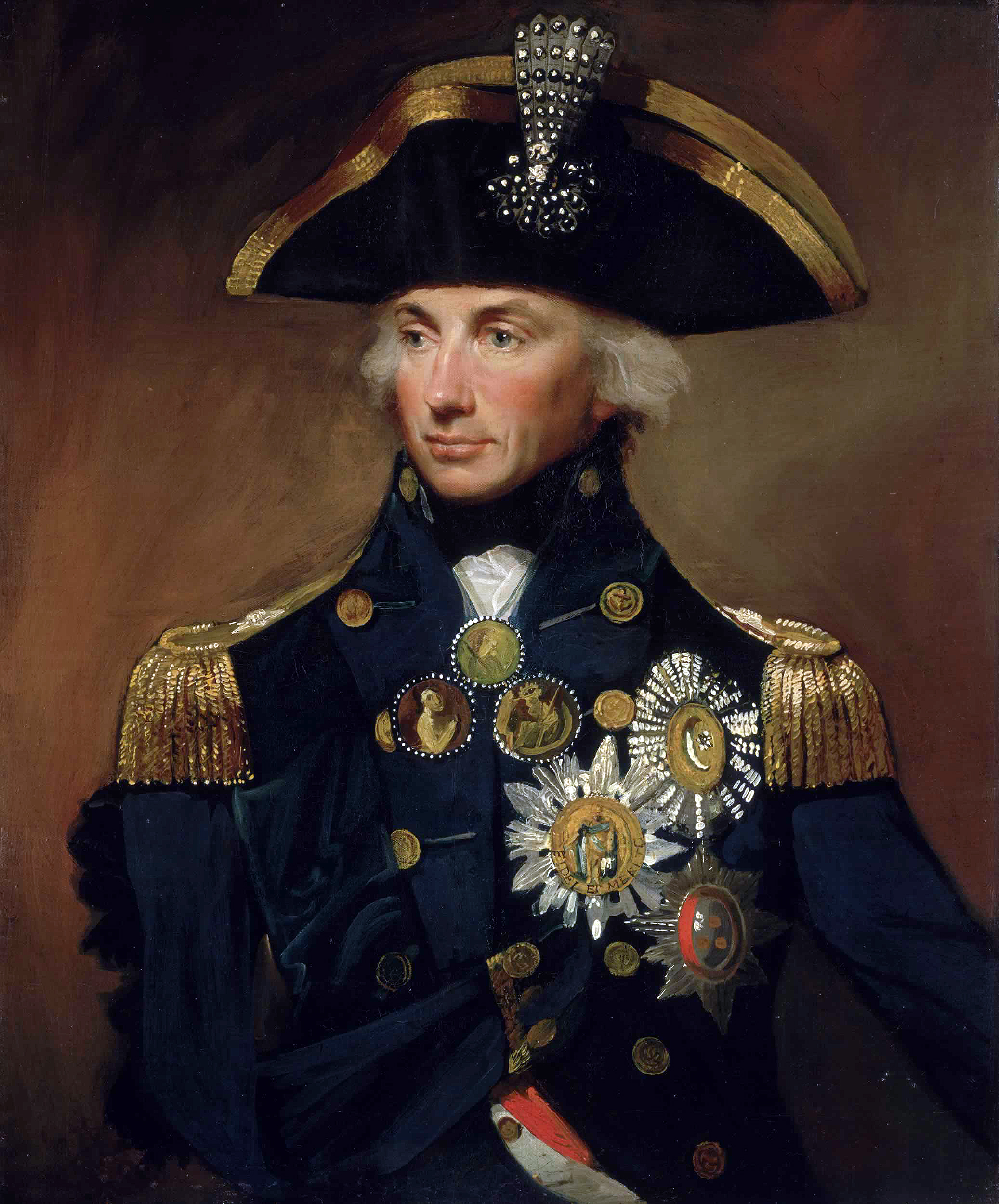
Horatio Nelson

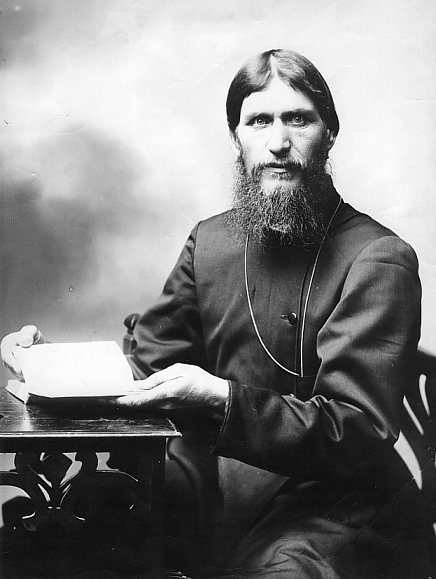
Grigori Rasputin

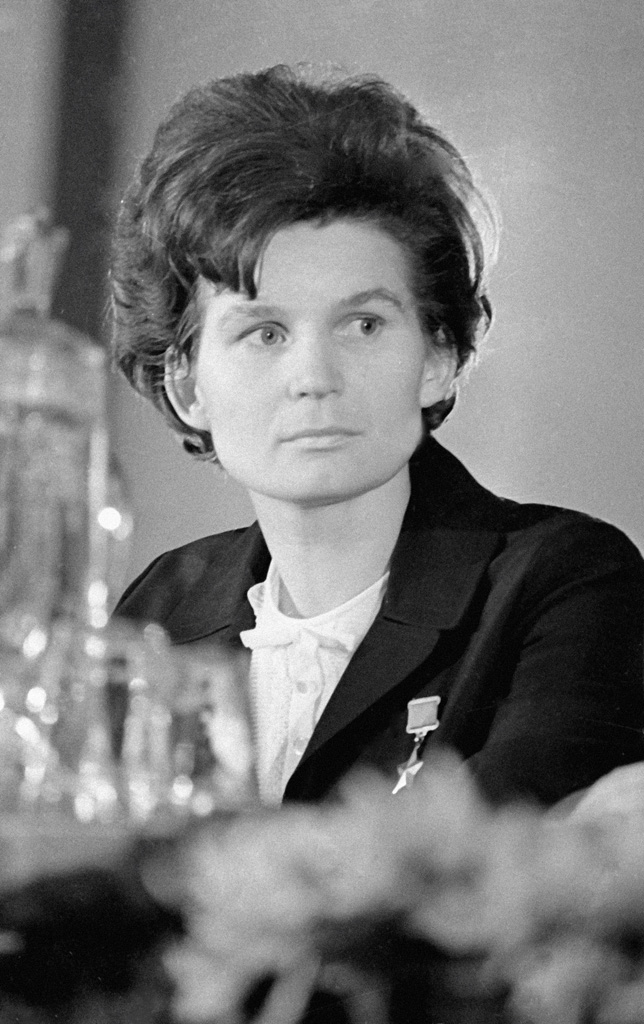
Valentina Tereshkova

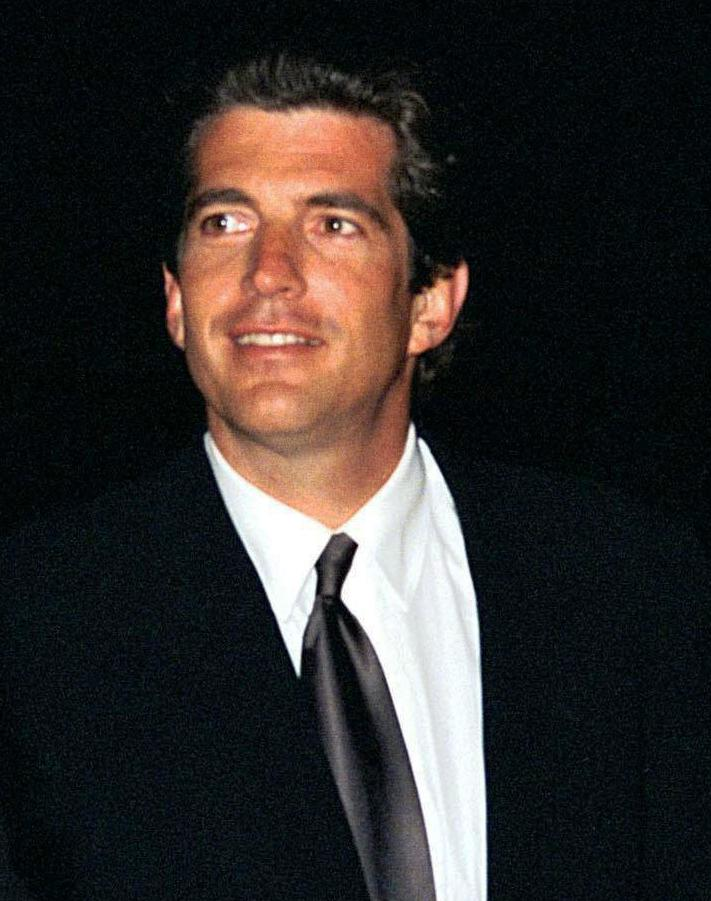
John F. Kennedy Jr.

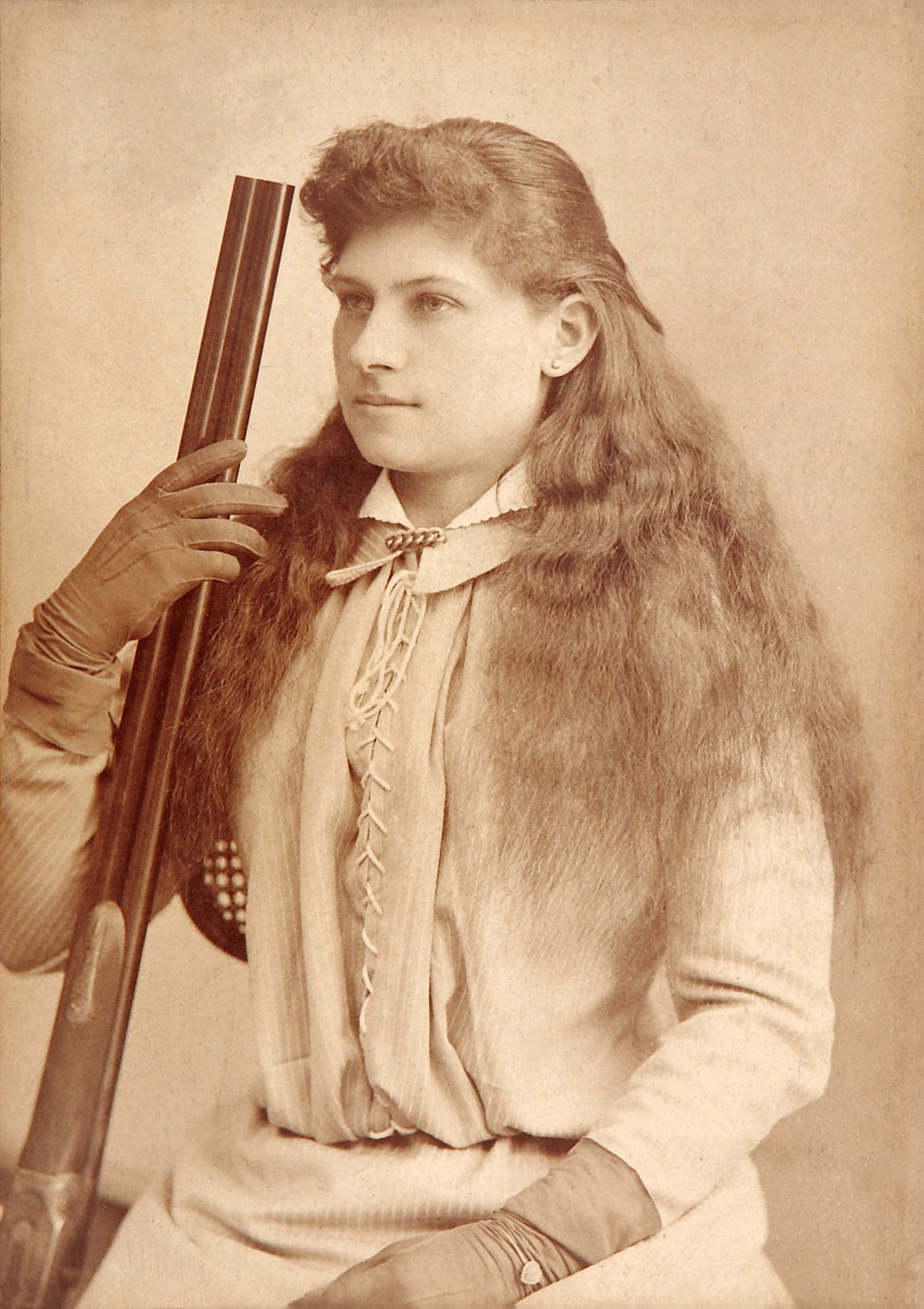
Annie Oakley

- Roald Amundsen, Norwegian polar explorer
- Robert Baden-Powell, 1st Baron Baden-Powell, British Army officer, founder and first Chief Scout of The Boy Scouts Association
- William Blackstone, English jurist and political figure
- Zofia Potocka, Greek slave courtesan and a Russian agent, later a Polish noble
- George Blake, British spy who worked as a double agent for the Soviet Union
- William Bligh, British Royal Navy, command of HMS Bounty, Governor of New South Wales in Australia and a colonial administrator
- Martin Bormann, prominent official in Nazi Germany as head of the Nazi Party Chancellery
- Johann Friedrich Böttger, German alchemist and the first European to discover the secret of the creation of hard-paste porcelain
- Guy Burgess, British radio producer, intelligence officer and Foreign Office official
- William Dampier, Englishman to explore parts of what is today Australia and pirate
- Karl Dönitz, German admiral who played a major role in the naval history of World War II
- Adolf Eichmann, German Nazi SS-Obersturmbannführer (lieutenant colonel) and one of the major organisers of the Holocaust
- Prince Eugene of Savoy, general of the Imperial Army and one of the most successful military commanders in modern European history
- Guy Fawkes, known as Guido Fawkes, member of a group of provincial English Catholics who planned the failed Gunpowder Plot
- Antoine Galland, French orientalist and archaeologist, most famous as the first European translator of One Thousand and One Nights
- Hermann Gmeiner, Austrian philanthropist and the founder of SOS Children's Villages
- Adam Griffith, American football player from Poland
- Mata Hari, Dutch exotic dancer and courtesan who was convicted of being a spy for Germany during World War I
- Kaspar Hauser, German youth who claimed to have grown up in the total isolation of a darkened cell
- Rudolf Höss, Nazi German SS-Obersturmbannführer (lieutenant colonel) and the longest-serving commandant of Auschwitz concentration and extermination camp in World War II
- Wilhelm Keitel, German field marshal who served as chief of the Oberkommando der Wehrmacht (Supreme Command of the Armed Forces, the OKW) for most of World War II
- Otto Lilienthal, German pioneer of aviation
- Luigi Lucheni, Italian anarchist who assassinated the Austrian Empress, Elisabeth
- Louis Philippe II, Colonel General (France) and member of a cadet branch of the House of Bourbon
- Ferdinand Magellan, Portuguese explorer
- John McDouall Stuart, Scottish explorer and one of the most accomplished of all Australia's inland explorers
- Erich Mielke, head of the East German Ministry for State Security (Ministerium für Staatsicherheit), better known as the Stasi
- Fridtjof Nansen, Norwegian explorer, scientist, diplomat, humanitarian and Nobel Peace Prize laureate
- Horatio Nelson, 1st Viscount Nelson, British flag officer in the Royal Navy
- Johann Heinrich Pestalozzi, Swiss pedagogue and educational reformer
- Elisabeth Petznek, nicknamed "The Red Archduchess"
- Albert Pierrepoint, hangman in England
- Grigory Potemkin, Russian military leader, statesman, nobleman and favourite of Catherine the Great
- Joseph Priestley, English theologian, English Dissenters clergyman, multi-subject educator
- Grigori Rasputin, Russian peasant and mystical faith healer
- Johann Philipp Reis, German scientist and inventor, he constructed the first make-and-break telephone
- Salvatore Riina, chief of the Sicilian Mafia
- Hartmann Schedel, German physician, humanist, historian, and one of the first cartographers to use the printing press
- Heinrich Schliemann, German archaeologist
- Richard Sorge, Soviet military intelligence officer during World War II
- Valentina Tereshkova, Russian cosmonaut and the first woman to have flown in space
- Friedrich von der Trenck, Prussian officer, adventurer, and author
- Victor of Aveyron, French feral child
- Minik Wallace, Inuk anthropology subject
- Raoul Wallenberg, Swedish architect, businessman, diplomat and humanitarian
- Arthur Wellesley, 1st Duke of Wellington, Field Marshal

=== North America ===
- Roy Benavidez, Veteran from the Vietnam war who was awarded the medal of honor
- John Wilkes Booth, American stage actor who assassinated President Abraham Lincoln
- Nikolas Cruz, perpetrator of the Stoneman Douglas High School shooting
- Dieter Dengler, United States Navy aviator
- Genie, pseudonym for a feral child who was a victim of severe abuse, neglect, and social isolation
- Peggy Guggenheim, American art collector and bohemian socialite
- Calamity Jane, American frontierswoman and professional scou]
- Caroline Kennedy, American author, attorney, diplomat and her brother John F. Kennedy Jr., American lawyer and journalist
- Billy the Kid, American Old West gunfighter who participated in New Mexico's Lincoln County War
- Robert E. Lee, American general known for commanding the Confederate Army of Northern Virginia in the American Civil War
- Jim Lovell, former NASA astronaut and a retired captain in the United States Navy
- Marisol Malaret, Puerto Rican TV Host, model and beauty queen
- James Naismith, Canadian-American, inventor of basketball
- Annie Oakley, American sharpshooter and exhibition shooter
- Lee Harvey Oswald, American former U.S. Marine who assassinated President John F. Kennedy
- Bonnie Parker, American criminal
- Robert Peary, American explorer who claimed to have reached the geographic North Pole
- Sager orphans, twice-orphaned American settlers
- Raphael Semmes, officer in the Confederate navy during the American Civil War
- William Tecumseh Sherman, American soldier, businessman, educator and author
- Thomas Sowell, American Economist & Social historian
- James West, Scouting leader, raised in an orphanage
- Paul R. Williams, American architect
- Aileen Wuornos, American serial killer
- Pancho Villa, Mexican Revolutionary general and one of the most prominent figures of the Mexican Revolution

=== South America ===
- Paulo Freire, Brazilian educator and philosopher who was a leading advocate of critical pedagogy.
- João Havelange, Brazilian lawyer, businessman, and athlete who served as the seventh President of FIFA
- Tiradentes, hero of Brazil and patron of the Military Police

== Fictional characters ==
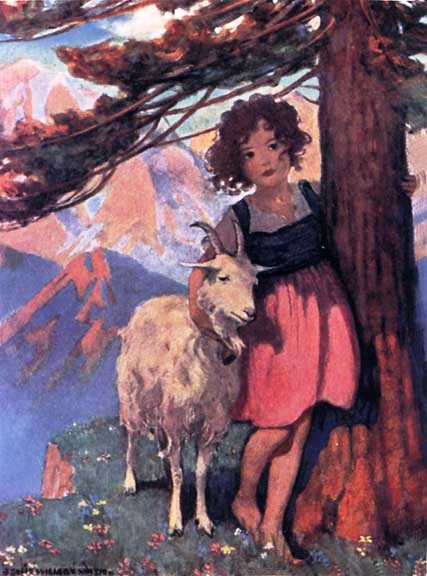
Heidi

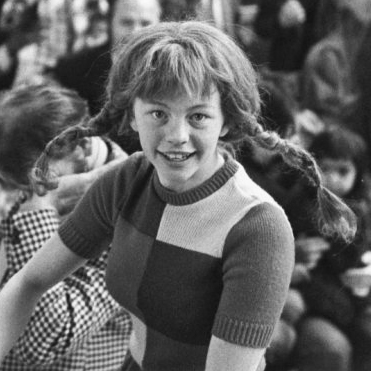
Pippi Longstocking

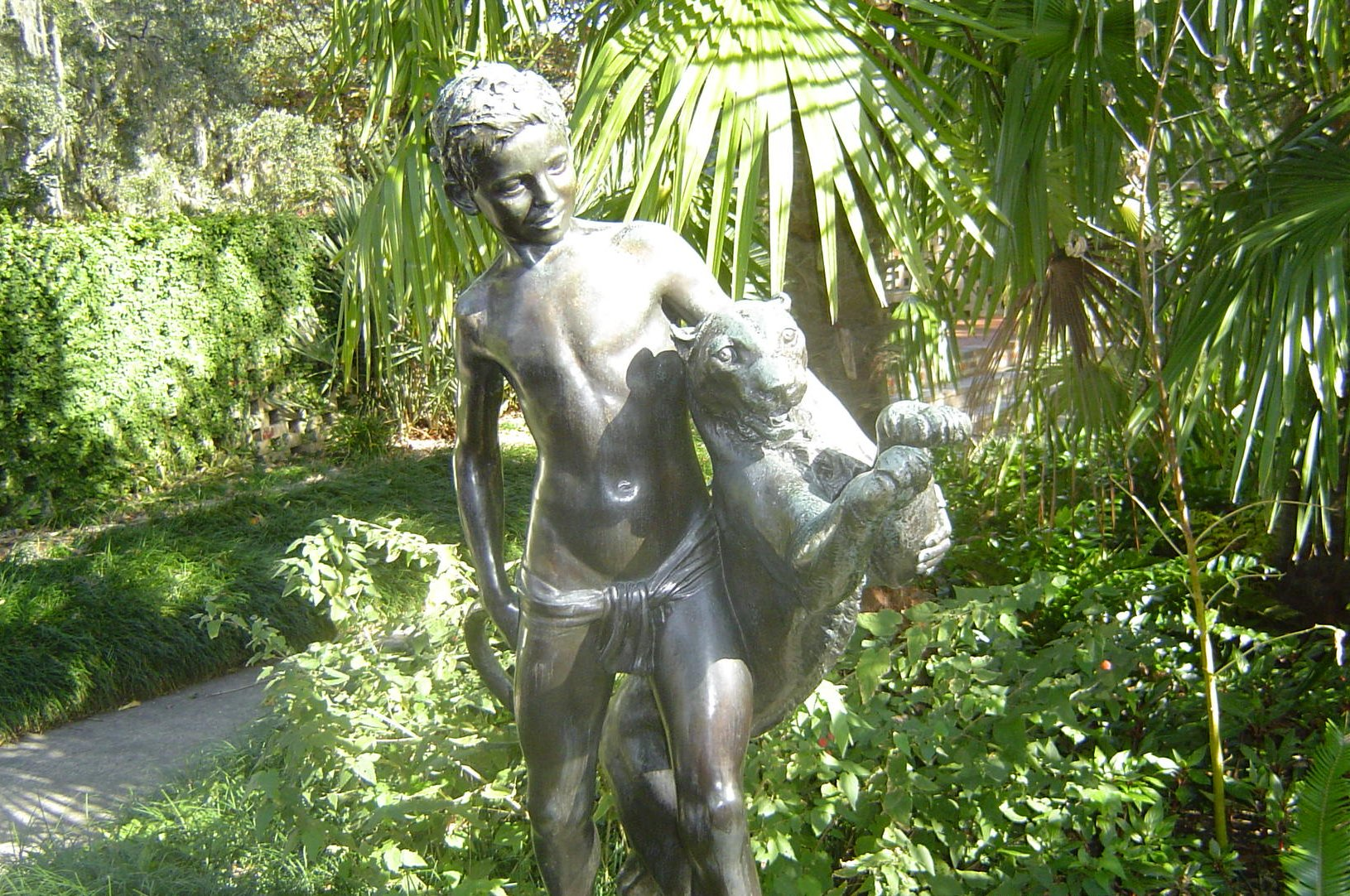
Mowgli

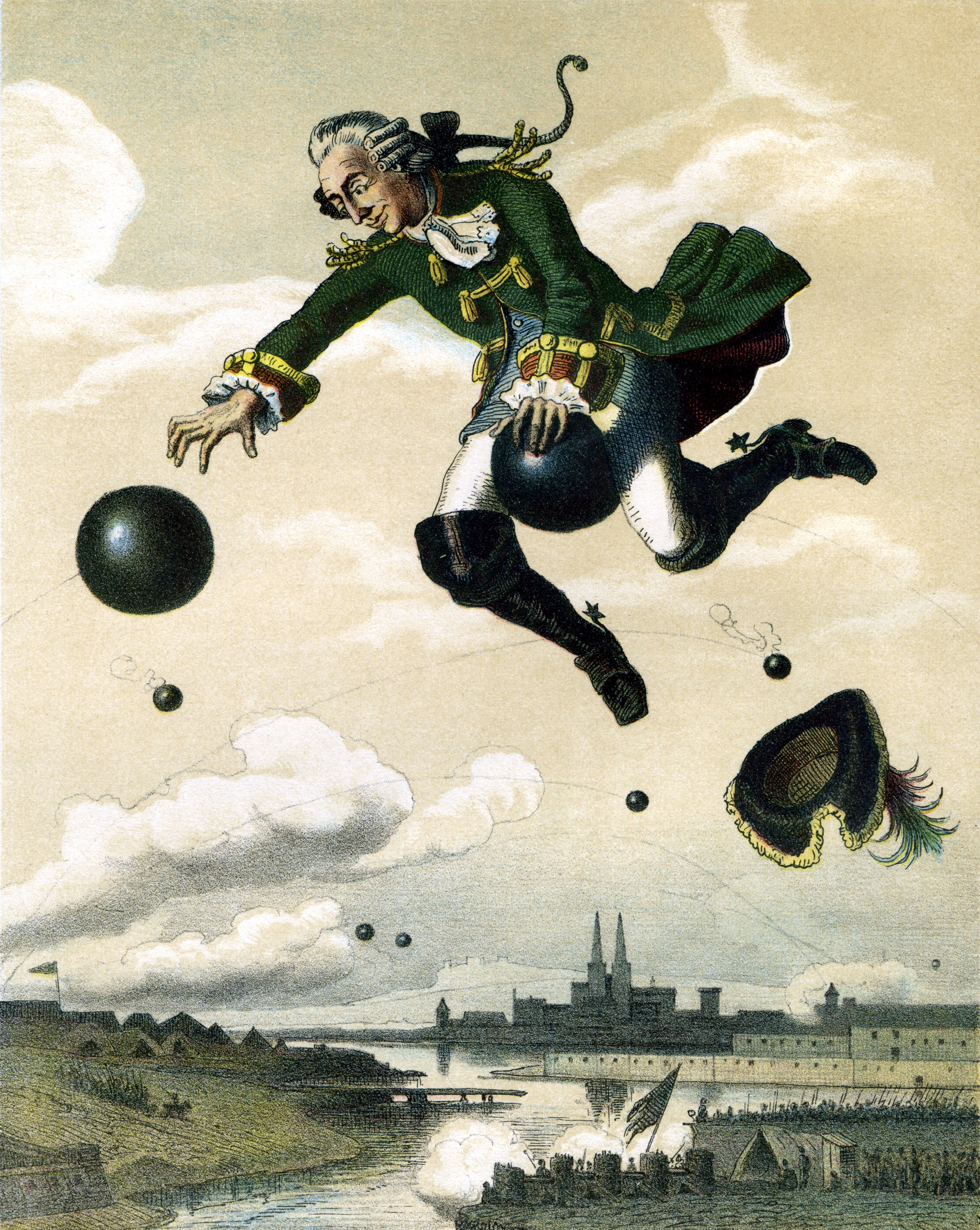
Baron Munchausen

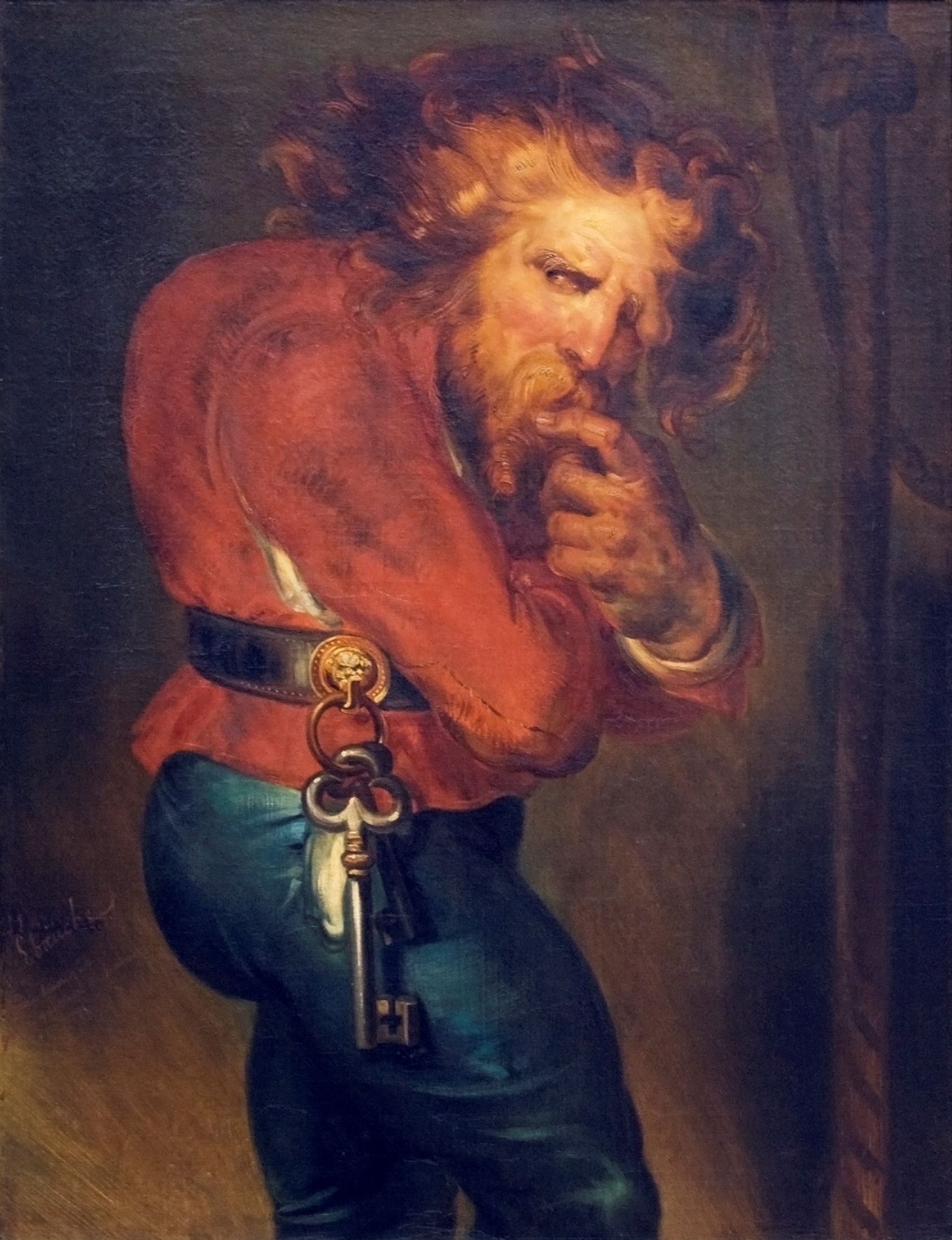
Quasimodo

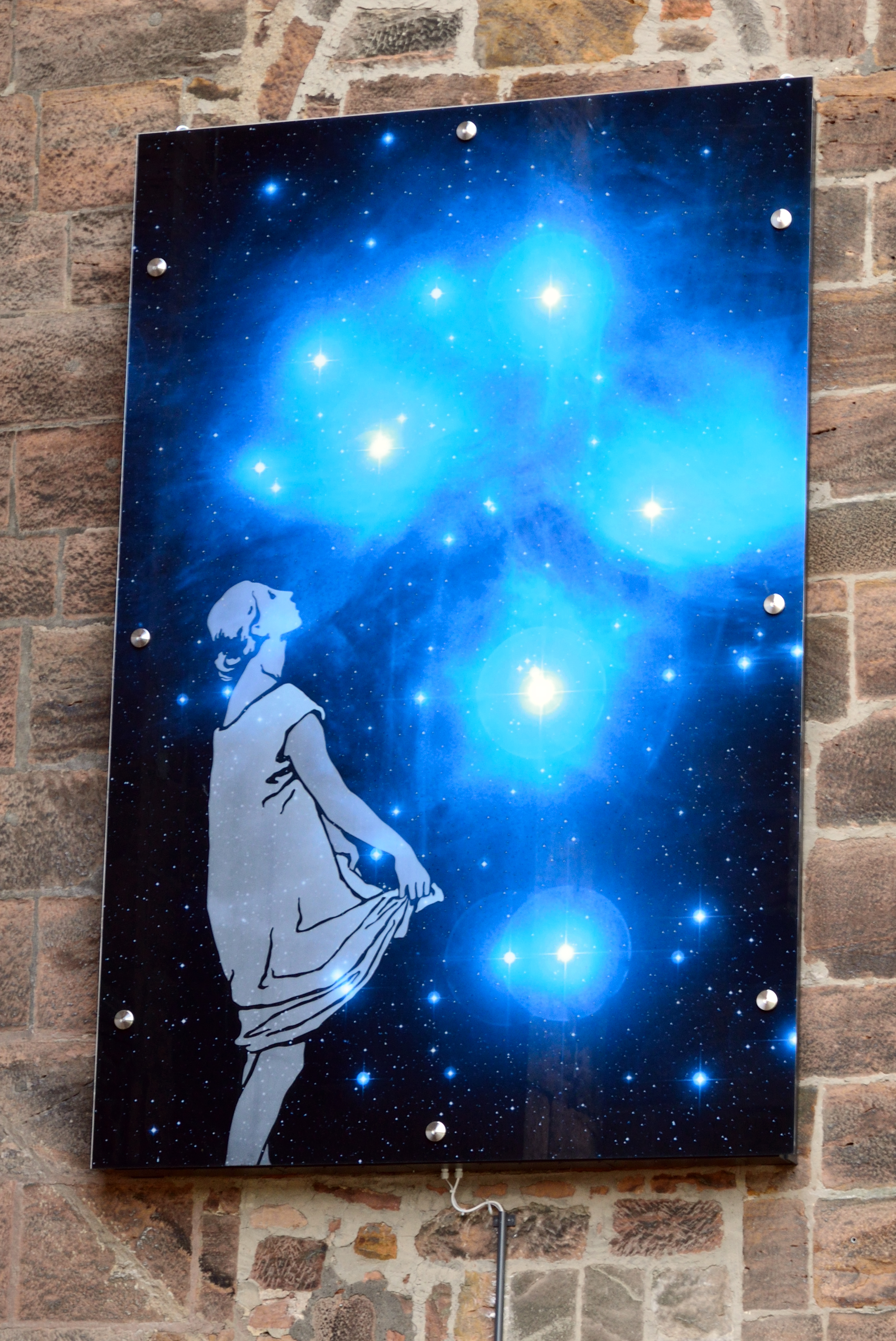
The Star Money

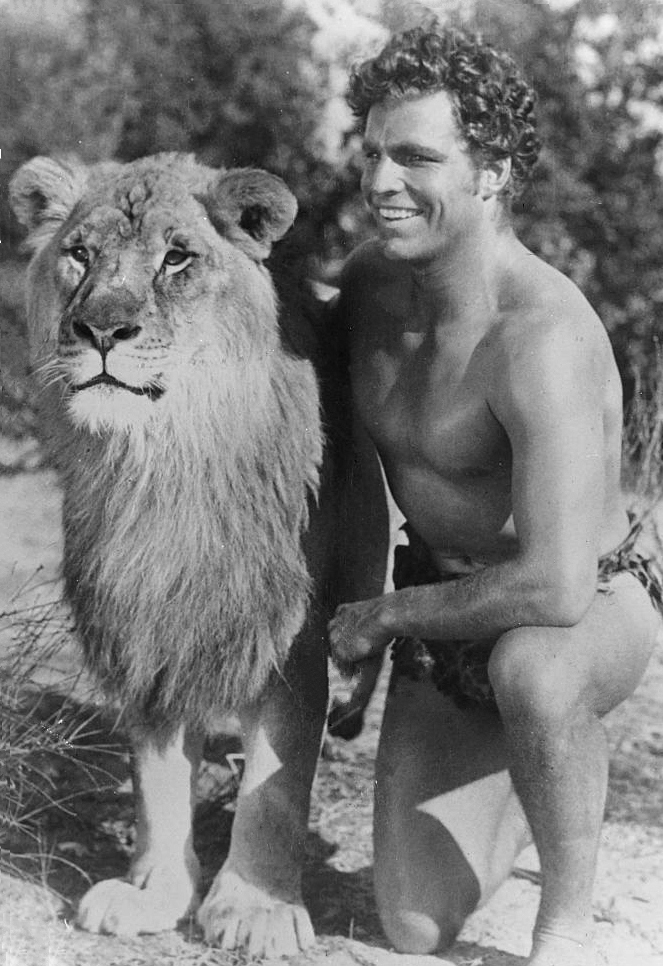
Tarzan

See also Category:Fictional orphans

=== In literature ===
- Amelia, The Star Money
- several characters in the American Girl doll series
- Frodo Baggins, The Lord of the Rings
- Bambi
- Banner, Bannertail
- Captain America
- Curious George
- Violet, Klaus, and Sunny Baudelaire, A Series of Unfortunate Events
- James Bond
- Nathaniel "Natty" Bumppo/Hawkeye, Leatherstocking Tales
- Cinderella
- David Copperfield
- Cosette, Les Misérables
- Sodapop, Darrel and Ponyboy Curtis, The Outsiders
- Eragon, Inheritance Cycle
- Esmeralda
- Rosa Esposto, The Lady of the Wheel
- Jane Eyre
- Huckleberry Finn
- Moll Flanders
- Dorothy Gale, Wonderful Wizard of Oz
- Heathcliff, Wuthering Heights
- Heidi
- Tom Jones
- Kim
- Krabat
- A Little Princess
- Pippi Longstocking
- Stephen Maturin, Master and Commander
- Momo
- Mowgli
- Baron Munchausen
- Pip, Great Expectations
- Pollyanna
- Harry Potter
- Quasimodo
- Tom Sawyer
- Anne Shirley, Anne of Green Gables
- Snow White
- The Little Prince
- Daenerys Targaryen, A Song of Ice and Fire
- Tarzan
- Oliver Twist
- Lord Voldemort
- Doctor Zhivago

=== In popular culture ===
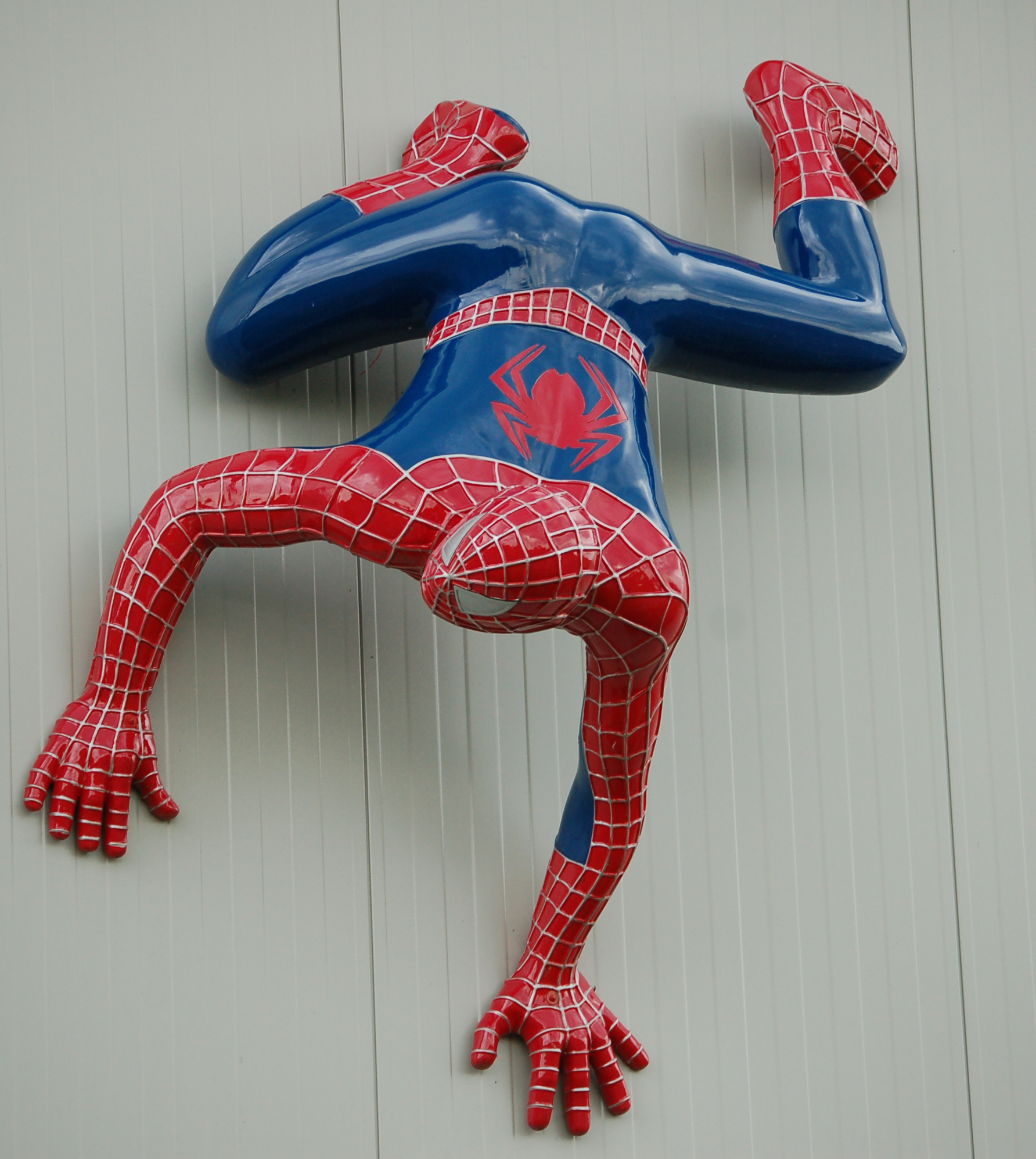
Spider-Man

- Admiral General Aladeen, The Dictator
- Allen Walker, D.Gray-man
- Alvin and the Chipmunks
- Edward Elric and Alphonse Elric, Fullmetal Alchemist
- Batman and Robin
- Bayman, Dead or Alive
- Erin Hannon, The Office
- Evey Hammond, V for Vendetta
- Finn the Human, Adventure Time
- Fox McCloud, Star Fox video games
- Goku, Dragon Ball
- Helena Douglas, Dead or Alive
- James Bond
- Kenshiro, Fist of the North Star
- Po, Kung Fu Panda
- Lex Luthor
- Little Orphan Annie
- Magneto, X-Men
- Marie Rose, Dead or Alive
- Jann Lee, Dead or Alive
- Sasuke Uchiha, Naruto
- Naruto Uzumaki, Naruto
- NiCO, Dead or Alive
- Paddington Bear
- Pi Patel, Life of Pi
- Punky Brewster
- Raiden, Metal Gear video game series
- Sailor Jupiter, Sailor Moon
- Shazam
- Snow White
- Sookie Stackhouse
- Spider-Man
- Leia Organa & Luke Skywalker, Star Wars
- Link, The Legend of Zelda video game series
- Lucina, Fire Emblem franchise
- Superman
- Will Hunting

== Related lists ==
See also Category:Adoptees for lists of notable people who have been adopted (including by step-parents): many adoptees are neither orphans nor foundlings.
