= List of principals of the University of Zimbabwe =

This is a list of principals of the University of Zimbabwe. The head of the university holds the title of Vice Chancellor (the Chancellor is the President of Zimbabwe ex officio).

The first chief executive of the university was William Rollo, who served as interim principal from 1953 to 1955. The first substantive Principal was Sir Walter Adams who served from 1955 to 1966 and was later Director of the London School of Economics. Sir Walter was succeeded by Terence Miller, who lasted a mere two years as his political views brought him into conflict with the government. His successor, Robert Craig, later Moderator of the General Assembly of the Church of Scotland, served from 1969 to 1980. Leonard J. Lewis served as Principal for the transition to Zimbabwe's independence, despite his somewhat controversial views on African education and politics. He was succeeded in 1981 by Walter Kamba, who became Vice–Chancellor, a new title replacing that of Principal. Like Miller, Kamba came into conflict with the government and he resigned in a controversial speech at the 1992 graduation ceremony, citing government interference and threats to academic freedom. He was succeeded by Gordon Chavunduka (1992–1996), who was followed by Graham Hill (1997–2002). Levi Nyagura served as Vice Chancellor beginning in 2003 until his resignation in April 2018 amidst allegations of abuse of office. He was succeeded by incumbent Vice Chancellor Paul Mapfumo on 17 August 2018.

== List of principals ==
| Image | Name | Title | Term |
|---|---|---|---|
| | William Rollo | Principal (interim) | November 1953 – December 1955 |
| | Walter Adams | Principal | December 1955 – 1967 |
| | Terence Miller | Principal | 1967–1969 |
| | Robert Craig | Principal | 1970–1980 |
| | Leonard Lewis | Principal | 1980–1981 |
| | Walter Kamba | Vice-Chancellor | 1981–1992 |
| | Gordon Chavunduka | Vice-Chancellor | 1992–1996 |
| | Graham Hill | Vice-Chancellor | 1997–2002 |
| | Levi Nyagura | Vice-Chancellor | January 2003 – April 2018 |
| | Paul Mapfumo | Vice-Chancellor | 17 August 2018 – 10 June 2019 (acting) |
| | Paul Mapfumo | Vice-Chancellor | 10 June 2019 – present |
