= Classical Association of South Africa =

- Abbreviation: CASA
- Formation: 1908
- Founded at: South African College, Cape Town
- Registration no.: 060-093
- Patron: Judge Deon van Zyl
- Honorary Presidents: J.E. Atkinson; L. Cilliers, J.M. Claassen; P.J. Conradie; W.J. Henderson; J. L. Hilton; M. Lambert
- Honorary Vice-President: F. Retief
- Website: https://casa-kvsa.org.za/

The Classical Association of South Africa (CASA) was first established in 1908, and has existed in its current form since 1956. The aim of CASA is to promote the study and appreciation of classical antiquity. The majority of its membership consists of academic staff and students, but membership is open to anyone who subscribes to this goal. The association organises a national conference at its biennial meeting, and national branches organise more frequent regional meetings.

The association sponsors various prizes and awards, and promotes several outreach initiatives.

== History ==
The inaugural meeting of the association was held on June 22, 1908 in Cape Town with the presidential address given by professor W. Ritchie at the South African College (now the University of Cape Town). The organisation was envisioned as a national association two years before the Union of South Africa came into being in 1910. The 1908 Association, though short-lived, was the precursor to the later association founded at Cape Town in 1927 by the Hon. J. H. Hofmeyr, Professors C. S. Edgar, W. Rollo, A. Petrie, and T. J. Haarhoff, with Marie V. Williams as honorary secretary.

The 1927 association enjoyed moderate success, but was beset with practical difficulties. After a period of decline and a brief revival in 1952, the Classical Association of South Africa was formally re-constituted in 1956. A national conference was held at Pretoria where the association as it exists today was founded, with Professors A. Petrie and T. J. Haarhoff as its honorary presidents. In 1957 the biennial national conference was established, and in 1958 the first volume of Acta Classica was published.

Early reports on the history of CASA are published in Acta Classica.

== Publications ==
The association produces a regular journal, Acta Classica. It also subsidises the publication of Akroterion (Journal for the Classics in South Africa, Department of Ancient Studies at the University of Stellenbosch).
