= John Atkinson (professor) =

British and South African classicist (1938–2022)

John Edward Atkinson
- Born: 20 October 1938
- Died: 11 April 2022 (aged 83); Cape Town, South Africa
- Occupation: Classical scholar

Academic background
- Education: University of Durham (BA) University of Cape Town (PhD)
- Thesis: A Commentary on Book 3 of Q. Curtius Rufus' Historiae Alexandri Magni (1971)
- Doctoral advisor: Ernst Badian

Academic work
- Discipline: Ancient history
- Institutions: University College of Rhodesia and Nyasaland; University of South Africa; University of Cape Town

John Edward Atkinson (20 October 1938 – 11 April 2022) was a British and South African classicist. He was Emeritus Professor of Classics, as well as a former Dean of the Faculty of Arts, at the University of Cape Town.

== Early life and education ==
Atkinson studied at Durham University. He took a BA (Hons) in Classical and General Literature in 1961, where he was classmates with R. M. Errington.

== Academic career ==
Following his undergraduate studies he joined the University College of Rhodesia and Nyasaland (now University of Zimbabwe) as Assistant Lecturer. He moved to the University of South Africa a year later to take up a Lectureship in Ancient History. In 1965 he joined the University of Cape Town as Lecturer, also completing a PhD under the supervision of Ernst Badian in 1971. His first book, A commentary on Q. Curtius Rufus' Historiae Alexandri Magni Books 3 and 4, was published in 1980.

Atkinson's area of specialization for much of his career was the Latin historian, Quintus Curtius Rufus. Joseph Roisman, in the Oxford Bibliographies entry on Alexander the Great, labelled Atkinson as the 'leading commentator on Curtius'. Jacek Rzepka, in a Bryn Mawr Classical Review article on Atkinson's work, described him as 'a scholar who has almost monopolized studies in Curtius Rufus for two decades'.

With the construction of the Apartheid system, Atkinson's political leanings saw him placed under monitoring by the domestic security service. He was once contacted and warned not to go ahead with a long-planned public lecture 'on the death of the tyrant Julius Caesar' after the assassination of Hendrik Verwoerd earlier the same day.

He served as a member of the editorial boards of both Acta Classica (1985–2003) and Akroterion (1985–2022). In 1996 he was elected Dean of the Faculty of Arts by a two-to-one majority. Despite his success as a researcher, recognition was slow in coming: he was rewarded with a full professorship only in 2000, and was finally elected Chairperson of the Classical Association of South Africa a year later. He retired 'slightly early' in 2001 but continued to teach for the next decade.

In later life he developed an interest in the Roman general Gnaeus Marcius Coriolanus, who became the subject of his last scholarly publication. One of his more unusual examples of scholarship was a 2021 article written in collaboration with maxillofacial surgeon Rushdi Hendricks that examined the wounds suffered by Philip of Macedon.

== Death ==
Atkinson died after a short illness in Cape Town, on 11 April 2022, at the age of 83.

== Selected publications ==
- Atkinson, J. E. (1980). A Commentary on Q. Curtius Rufus' Historiae Alexandri Magni, Books 3 and 4. Amsterdam: J. C. Gieben.
- ——— (1994). A Commentary on Q. Curtius Rufus' Historiae Alexandri Magni, Books 5–7.2. Amsterdam: A. M. Hakkert. ISBN 9789025610371.
- ——— (1998–2000). Storie di Alessandro di Curzio Rufo. Milan: Fondazione Lorenza Valla Mandadori.
- Atkinson, J. E.; Yardley, J. C., eds. (2009). Curtius Rufus, Histories of Alexander the Great, Book 10. Oxford: Oxford University Press. ISBN 9780199557622.
