= Maria Williams =

Maria Williams may refer to:

- Maria P. Williams, credited as the first Black woman film producer
- Maria Jane Williams, Welsh musician and folklorist

== See also ==
- Marie Williams (disambiguation)
