= Duncan Shaw (minister, born 1925) =

Scottish Presbyterian minister, historian, and author (1925–2018)

The Very Reverend Duncan Shaw
- Moderator of the General Assembly
- Church: Church of Scotland
- In office: 1987 to 1988
- Predecessor: Robert Craig
- Successor: James A. Whyte

Orders
- Ordination: 29 July 1951

Personal details
- Born: 27 January 1925
- Died: 20 February 2018 (aged 93)
- Denomination: Presbyterianism
- Occupation: Church minister and historian

Duncan Shaw (27 January 1925 – 20 February 2018) was a Scottish Presbyterian minister, historian, and author. He served as Moderator of the General Assembly of the Church of Scotland from 1987 to 1988.

== Early life and education ==
Shaw was born on 27 January 1925 in Edinburgh, Scotland: he grew up in a tenement flat in the Meadowbank area of the city. He was educated at Broughton High School, a state school in Broughton, Edinburgh. After leaving school, he was a law apprentice.

In February 1943, at the age of 18, Shaw enlisted into the Royal Electrical Mechanical Engineers (REME) to serve during the Second World War. He went on to hold every rank between lance corporal and Warrant Officer Class 1 (the most senior non-commissioned rank). He served in the United Kingdom and in India, before being demobbed in October 1947. It was while serving in the British Army that he first grew a handlebar moustache for which he was noted for wearing.

Returning to Scotland after the war, Shaw decided to join the ministry rather than continue his legal career. From 1947 to 1951, he studied at the University of Edinburgh. He continued his studies at Edinburgh: he undertook research for a Doctor of Philosophy (PhD) degree in Scottish history under the supervision of Professor Gordon Donaldson. His doctoral thesis was titled "The origin and development of the General Assembly of the Church of Scotland, 1560–1600", and was completed in 1962. He was awarded a Doctor of Theology (ThDr) degree by the Charles University in Prague in 1969.

== Ordained ministry ==
Shaw was ordained for the Church of Scotland and installed as minister of St Margaret's Church, Dumbiedykes, Edinburgh on 29 July 1951. He tended to serve in churches in working-class communities. He moved to become minister of St Christopher's Church, Craigentinny, Edinburgh in 1959, and served there until he retired on 3 January 1997.

=== Moderator ===
Shaw was elected Moderator of the General Assembly of the Church of Scotland, in succession to Robert Craig. He served as moderator from 1987 to 1988. He invited Margaret Thatcher, the then prime minister, to address the Assembly when it met in May 1988: her address was known as the Sermon on the Mound.

== Personal life ==
In 1955, Shaw married Ilse Pieter (died 1989). Together they had three children. In 1991, he married for a second time to Anna Libera Dallapiccola, a professor at the University of Heidelberg.

In 2005, Shaw helped re-establish the Clan Shaw of Argyll and the Isles: he appointed its Representer (equivalent to clan chief) by the Lord Lyon King of Arms. The clan had been annihilated by Clan Campbell in 1614. He had previously tried and failed to claim the Barony of Craigentinny.

Shaw died in Edinburgh on 20 February 2018, aged 93.

== Selected works ==
- Shaw, Duncan (1964). General Assemblies of the Church of Scotland, 1560–1600. Edinburgh: St Andrew Press. ISBN 978-0715201244.
- Shaw, Duncan (1975). John Knox: a quartercentenary reappraisal: lectures given at the University of Edinburgh on the four hundredth anniversary of the death of John Knox. Edinburgh: St Andrew Press. ISBN 978-0715202463.
- Cowan, Ian B.; Shaw, Duncan, eds. (1983). The Renaissance and Reformation in Scotland: essays in honour of Gordon Donaldson. Edinburgh: Scottish Academic Press. ISBN 978-0707302614.
- Shaw, Duncan (2012). Renaissance and Zwinglian influences in sixteenth century Scotland. Edinburgh: Edina Press. ISBN 978-0957120204.
- Shaw, Duncan (2015). The Clan Shaw of Argyll and the Isles: MacGillechainnich of Dalriada. Edinburgh: Scottish Record Society. ISBN 978-0902054523.

Religious titles
Preceded by Robert Craig	Moderator of the General Assembly of the Church of Scotland; 1987–1988	Succeeded by James A. Whyte
