= Miriam T. Griffin =

American historian

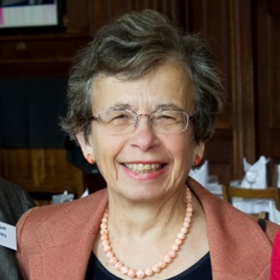
- Born: June 6, 1935; New York City, U.S.
- Died: 16 May 2018 (aged 82); Oxford, England
- Occupation: Classical scholar
- Spouse: Jasper Griffin (m. 1960–2018; her death)

Academic background
- Education: St Anne's College, Oxford; Barnard College, Columbia University; Harvard University
- Thesis: Seneca: The statesman and the Writer (1968)

Academic work
- Discipline: Ancient history
- Institutions: Somerville College, Oxford
- Doctoral students: Hannah Cotton, Kathleen Coleman, David Wardle
- Notable works: Nero: The End of a Dynasty, Seneca: A Philosopher in Politics

Miriam Tamara Griffin (née Dressler; 6 June 1935 – 16 May 2018) was an American classical scholar and tutor of ancient history at Somerville College at the University of Oxford from 1967 to 2002. She was a scholar of Roman history and ancient thought, and wrote books on the Emperor Nero and his tutor, Seneca, encouraging an appreciation of the philosophical writings of the ancient Romans within their historical context.

== Early life and education ==
Griffin was born and brought up in New York City. She was the only child of Jewish parents, Fanny Dressler (née Natelson) and Leo Dressler. Fanny Dressler was a stenographer and Leo Dressler was a school teacher.

Griffin attended Erasmus Hall High School in New York. Griffin's alma mater was Barnard College, Columbia University in New York City, from which she graduated with a BA degree in 1956. She had an AM degree from Radcliffe College of Harvard University, Massachusetts. She attended the University of Oxford as a Fulbright scholar in 1957. Her alma mater at the University of Oxford was St Anne's College, where she matriculated in 1957. She graduated with a first in "Greats" in 1960. Griffin completed her DPhil at the University of Oxford in 1968. Her thesis was supervised by Ronald Syme, and entitled Seneca: The Statesman and the Writer.

== Career ==
Griffin held a Junior Research Fellowship at St Anne's College, University of Oxford, before being appointed Tutor in Ancient History at Somerville College in 1967. Her research interests included Roman history, the late Republic and early Empire, and intellectual history. She was described as "a generous, kind and warm colleague and a mentor to generations of students".

Griffin was a scholar of the Julio-Claudian imperial dynasty and ancient philosophy. Her book Seneca: a Philosopher in Politics (1976) examined the tensions between philosophy and politics in the life and career of Seneca. The volume was described by reviewers as "a work of consequence" and an "authoritative book".

Griffin's book Nero: The End of a Dynasty was first published in 1984, and republished in 2000 and 2013. It was translated into French by Alexis D'Hautcourt and published as Néron, ou, La fin d'une dynastie in 2002. Griffin places Nero as a person, including "his desire for popularity and his fear and insecurity", in the context of the social and legislative structures of his time, and examines the ways in which this contributed to his downfall. She said in an interview with The New York Times that "Nero was a man of taste, rather than intellect, and by the time of his death, I think, he was losing his mental balance". The incipient rebellion against his rule threw him into a state of panic, she added, exacerbated by his persecutory delusions. Her work was reviewed as a "splendid book", a "perceptive study", and "close to giving us the definitive account of the last and worst of the Julio-Claudians".

Griffin edited the journal The Classical Quarterly (2002–2007). She was a long-standing editor of the Clarendon Ancient History Series for Oxford University Press.

In 2011, Griffin gave the Nineteenth Todd Memorial Lecture at the University of Sydney on the topic of 'Symptoms and Sympathy in Latin Letters'. Griffin was one of five women to deliver the lecture in its history.

In 2013, Griffin was on the Steering Committee of the Oxford Classics Conclave, which hosted a dinner to which all women engaged in classics teaching or research at Oxford were invited. Sixty-two women were invited to celebrate their increased presence on the faculty. Griffin arranged to hold the first Women in Classics dinner at her current institution, Somerville College, where thirty-one women attended on 5 October 2013. The steering committee also included Josephine Crawley Quinn, Susan Treggiari, and Gail Trimble.

Griffin taught Gillian Clark and Tessa Rajak as undergraduates. Her doctoral students include Hannah Cotton, Professor in Classics at the Hebrew University of Jerusalem, Kathleen Coleman, James Loeb Professor of the Classics at Harvard University and David Wardle, Professor of Classics and Acting Dean of the Faculty of Humanities at the University of Cape Town.

A volume of Griffin's collected papers, edited by Catalina Balmaceda, is due to be published in June 2018 by Oxford University Press. The volume is entitled Politics and Philosophy at Rome: Collected Papers, and includes previously unpublished lectures.

== Personal life ==
Griffin had a lifelong passion for music, and was an accomplished pianist. She was married to Jasper Griffin of Balliol College. They met as students at Oxford and married in New York after their examinations in the summer of 1960. The couple had three daughters—Julia Griffin, Miranda Williams, and Tamara Sykorova—and a granddaughter.

== Honours ==
In 2002, Griffin was the dedicatee of a Festschrift in honour of her career titled Philosophy and Power in the Graeco-Roman World: Essays in Honour of Miriam Griffin (2002). On 20 August 2018, she was awarded the British Academy Medal in recognition of "lifetime achievement".

== Selected bibliography ==
Griffin published articles in academic journals in both fields, as well as contributing to 61 reference entries in the Oxford Classical Dictionary, 3rd rev. ed. (2005). She wrote reviews and articles in the London Review of Books and The New York Review of Books.

=== Books ===
- Seneca: a philosopher in politics. Clarendon Press, 1976. ISBN 0198143656.
- Nero: the end of a dynasty. Batsford, 1984. ISBN 0713444649. This details the events of Nero's reign and then analyses the reasons for his downfall.
- Seneca on society. Oxford University Press, 2013. ISBN 9780199245482.

=== Edited collections ===
- Philosophia Togata I. Essays on Philosophy and Roman Society. Edited by Miriam Griffin and Jonathan Barnes. Oxford University Press, 1997. ISBN 9780198150855.
- Philosophia Togata II. Plato and Aristotle at Rome. Edited by Jonathan Barnes and Miriam Griffin. Oxford University Press, 2000. ISBN 9780198152224.
- A Companion to Julius Caesar. Edited by Miriam Griffin. Wiley, 2009. ISBN 9781405149235.
- Health and Sickness in Ancient Rome; Greek and Roman Poetry and Historiography. Edited by Francis Cairns and Miriam Griffin. Francis Cairns, 2010. ISBN 9780905205533.
- Studies in Stoicism. P. A. Brunt. Edited by Miriam Griffin, Alison Samuels, and with the assistance of Michael Crawford. Oxford University Press, 2013. ISBN 9780199695850.

=== Translations ===
- On Benefits. Lucius Annaeus Seneca. Translated by Miriam Griffin and Brad Inwood. University of Chicago Press, 2011. ISBN 978-0-226-74840-5.

=== Edited texts ===
- Cicero: On Duties. Edited by M. T. Griffin and E. M. Atkins. Cambridge University Press, 1991. ISBN 9780521343381.
- "Cicero on Life and Death." Translated by John Davie. Edited with an introduction and Notes by Miriam T. Griffin. World's Classics. Oxford University Press, 2017. ISBN 9780199644148.

=== Articles ===
- 'De Brevitate Vitae', The Journal of Roman Studies, Vol. 52, Parts 1 and 2 (1962), pp. 104–113
- 'Seneca on Cato's Politics: Epistle 14. 12-13', The Classical Quarterly, New Series, Vol. 18, No. 2 (Nov., 1968), pp. 373–375
- 'The 'Leges Iudiciariae' of the Pre-Sullan Era', The Classical Quarterly, Vol. 23, No. 1 (May, 1973), pp. 108–126

== Sources ==
- Clark, Gillian; Rajak, Tessa (2002). Philosophy and Power in the Graeco-Roman World: Essays in honour of Miriam Griffin. Oxford: Oxford University Press. ISBN 0198299907.
- Mehta, Ved (1993). Up at Oxford. London: J. Murray. ISBN 0719552877.
