= William J. Dominik =

Australian-American Classical Studies scholar

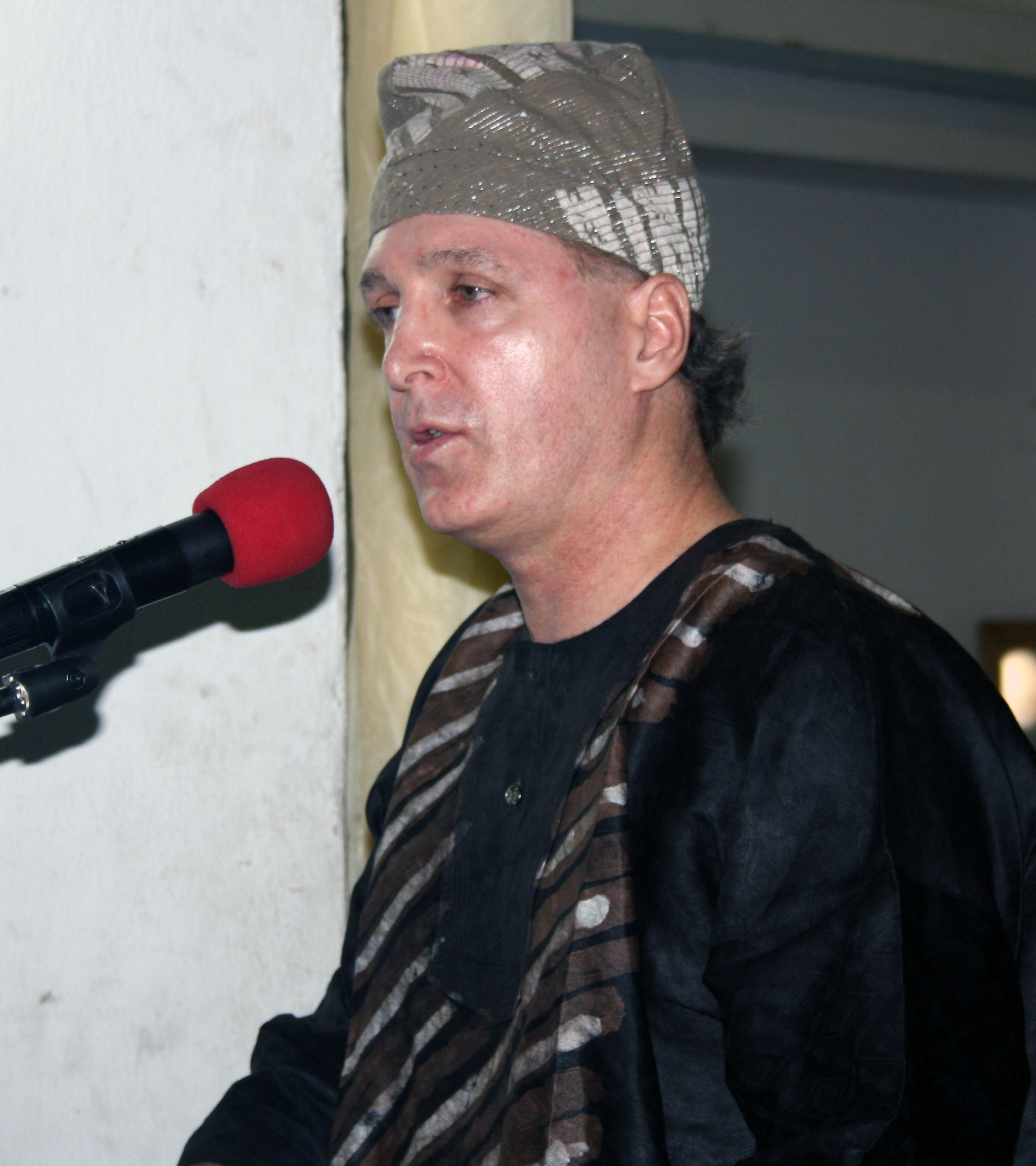
- Dominik at the University of Ibadan in 2010
- Born: 29 December 1953 (age 72); Cleveland, Ohio, US
- Occupation: Professor of Classical Studies

Academic background
- Education: Monash University PhD; Texas Tech University MA; University of the Pacific BA Tchg Cred; University of Durham Cert IES
- Alma mater: Monash University
- Thesis: The Poet and His Craft: A Critical Study of the Speeches in the Thebais of Statius (1989)
- Doctoral advisor: Anthony J. Boyle

Academic work
- Discipline: Classical Studies
- Sub-discipline: Latin literature
- Institutions: Federal University of Juiz de Fora 2024–2026; University of Lisbon 2018–present University of Stellenbosch 2025–2028; University of Otago 2002–present Federal University of Bahia 2010, 2016–2017; University of Oxford 2013; University of Edinburgh 2006–2007; University of Natal 1991–2001; University of Cambridge 2000–2001; University of Leeds 1997–1998; Texas Tech University 1981–1982, 1990–1991; Monash University 1985–1988

William J. Dominik is an Australian-American scholar of Classical Studies. He is presently Visiting Professor of Literary Studies at the University of Juiz de Fora; Integrated Researcher of Classical Studies at the University of Lisbon; Extraordinary Professor of Ancient Studies at the University of Stellenbosch; and Professor Emeritus of Classics at the University of Otago.

== Life ==
Dominik is the son of university professors of classical music and spent his childhood in a number of states in the US. After studying Classics at the University of Durham in 1973–1974 and completing his student teaching at the American School Foundation of Mexico City in 1975, he earned a BA in Classics and English from the University of the Pacific and a California Teaching Credential from the California Commission on Teacher Credentialing in 1975. Dominik left the USA in 1976 to live overseas for what has amounted to all but a few years. A resident of Sintra, Portugal as of 2018, Dominik possesses dual Australian and American citizenship. He is married to Brazilian artist and former nutritionist Najla Barroso Dominik, a member of the Academy of Letters and Arts of Salvador, Brazil.

== Career ==
Dominik received his PhD in Classical Studies from Monash University in 1989 after gaining an MA in Classical Humanities from Texas Tech University in 1982. He taught at the University of Natal from 1991 to 2001, where he rose to the rank of Professor and Chair of Classics and Director of the Program in Classics. Dominik moved to the University of Otago as Professor and Chair of Classics in 2002, where he served as Head of the Department of Classics from 2002 to 2009; he was awarded Professor Emeritus status in 2015.

An idiosyncratic aspect of Dominik's career has been its wide international dimension and sustained academic mobility. In addition to holding the aforecited established posts at the University of Natal and the University of Otago, he has served (or has served) in recent years as Visiting Professor of Classical Studies at the Federal University of Juiz de Fora (2024–2026); Invited/Visiting Professor, Integrated Researcher, and Research Fellow at the University of Lisbon (2018–present); Extraordinary Professor of Ancient Studies at the University of Stellenbosch (2025–2028); and CAPES Visiting Foreign Professor at the Federal University of Bahia (2010, 2016–2017). He has also held visiting professorships and other teaching/research positions at Texas Tech University (1981–1982, 1990–1991), Monash University (1985–1988), University of Leeds (1997–1998), University of Cambridge (2000–2001), University of Edinburgh (2006–2007), and the University of Oxford (2013).

== Research ==
Dominik is the author or editor of a few hundred publications (mainly chapters in edited books and journal articles and reviews), including sixteen monographs, on Latin literature, especially Roman epic of the Flavian period; Roman rhetoric; the classical tradition and reception; lexicography; etymology; and other topics. Dominik's research is significant for its emphasis upon the political, especially critical and dissident, aspects of imperial Roman literature (to which one critic refers as “la osadía de Dominik"); its positive hermeneutic approach to the literature and rhetoric of the imperial era; and its treatment of a range of writers in Latin literature and rhetoric from the Early Republic through Late Antiquity to the Early Modern Period.

Distinctive features of Dominik's research and pedagogical output are its wide disciplinary range and its collaborative character. In addition to his work on Roman epic, rhetoric, and literary reception, his publications address political and ideological writing, satire, historiography, myth criticism, translation studies, lexicography, and etymology. Dominik’s scholarship engages with Latin writers from the Republican through Late Antique periods (e.g., Ennius, Vergil, Horace, Ovid, Seneca the Younger, Petronius, Martial, Statius, Silius Italicus, Valerius Flaccus, Tacitus, Pliny the Younger, Quintilian, Claudian, Sidonius Apollinaris, Ausonius, Dracontius, and Corippus) and Greek authors from Archaic Greece through Late Antiquity (e.g., Homer, Euripides, Sophocles, Apollonius of Rhodes, Philostratus, and Quintus Smyrnaeus). His work also engages with medieval and Renaissance writers in the transmission and later reception of classical literature.

The collaborative dimension of Dominik’s scholarly activities is reflected in his extensive editorial and academic service. In addition to serving as the founding editor and manager of the Classics series Scholia: Studies in Classical Antiquity (1992–2011), Dominik has served as a referee for over seven score publishers, journals, and institutions. He has also supervised, examined, and moderated more than a gross of postgraduate and honours dissertations.

Dominik has delivered nearly two hundred lectures and papers, including invited or commemorative presentations such as a University of Cambridge Faculty of Classics Literature Seminar (2000); an Inaugural Professorial Lecture at the University of Otago (2002); the keynote address at the Federal University of Bahia Inaugural Classics Colloquium (2010); the Third Biennial Constantine Leventis Memorial Lecture at the University of Ibadan (2010); a Royal Society of New Zealand National Identity Symposium Presentation (2011); an Oxford Philological Society lecture (2013); the Inaugural Seminar at the Federal University of Sergipe Postgraduate Program in History (2016); and a keynote speech at the Thirty-fifth Biennial Conference of the Classical Association of South Africa (2025).

Dominik has received over a couple of hundred individual research fellowships, grants, and awards (including renewals and sponsored visits), such as a Commonwealth Fellowship at the University of Leeds (1997-1998); a South African Human Sciences Research Council Established Researcher Grant (1997-1998); a Visiting Research Fellowship at Clare Hall, Cambridge (2000-2001); an Institute for Advanced Studies in the Humanities Visiting Research Fellowship at the University of Edinburgh (2006-2007); a Visiting Research Centre Associateship at St. John's College, Oxford (2013); a Plumer Visiting Research Fellowship at St. Anne's College, Oxford (2013); and a Foundation for Science and Technology Research Fellowship at the University of Lisbon (2019-2022).

== Books ==
- Brill’s Companion to Statius (Leiden 2015). ISBN 97-89-00-4217898. (co-ed. with C. E. Newlands and K. Gervais)
- Petronii Satyricon Concordantia (Hildesheim 2013). ISBN 978-3-487-14893-9. (co-ed. with J. E. Holland)
- A Companion to Roman Rhetoric (Oxford 2010, 2007). ISBN 978-1-4443-3415-9. (co-ed. with J. Hall)
- Writing Politics in Imperial Rome (Leiden 2009). ISBN 978-90-04-156715. (co-ed. with J. Garthwaite and P. A. Roche)
- Flavian Rome: Culture, Image, Text (Leiden 2003). ISBN 90-04-11188-3. (co-ed. with A. J. Boyle)
- Literature, Art, History: Studies on Classical Antiquity and Tradition. In Honour of W. J. Henderson (Hildesheim 2003). ISBN 3-631-36837-2. (co-ed. with A. F. Basson)
- Anthologiae Latinae Concordantia Pars 1: A-L (Hildesheim 2002). ISBN 3-487-11737-1. (co-ed. with P. G. Christiansen and J. E. Holland)
- Anthologiae Latinae Concordantia Pars 2: M–Z (Hildesheim 2002). ISBN 3-487-11738-X. (co-ed. with P. G. Christiansen and J. E. Holland)
- Words & Ideas (Mundelein 2018 [corrected reprint], 2012, 2009, 2008, 2006, 2002). ISBN 978-0-86516-485-7. (ed.)
- Words & Ideas: Answer Key (Mundelein 2017 [reprint], 2014, 2009, 2006). ISBN 978-0-86516-637-0.
- Roman Verse Satire: Lucilius to Juvenal. A Selection with an Introduction, Text, Translations, and Notes (Mundelein 2011 [revised edition], 1999). ISBN 978-0-86516-442-0. (co-ed. and co-tr. with W. T. Wehrle)
- Roman Eloquence: Rhetoric in Society and Literature (London 1997). ISBN 0-415-12544-8 hbk; ISBN 0-415-12545-6 pbk. (ed.)
- Concordantia in Sidonii Apollinaris Epistulas (Hildesheim 1997). ISBN 3-487-10567-5. (co-ed. with P. G. Christiansen and J. E. Holland)
- The Mythic Voice of Statius: Power and Politics in the Thebaid (Leiden 1994). ISBN 90-04-09972-7.
- Speech and Rhetoric in Statius’ Thebaid (Hildesheim 1994). ISBN 3-487-09814-8.
- Concordantia in Claudianum (Hildesheim 1988). ISBN 3-487-07848-1. (assisted ed. P. G. Christiansen)
