= Graham Hill (academic) =

Zimbabwean veterinarian and academic

Vice Chancellor of the University of Zimbabwe
- In office 1997–2002
- Preceded by: Gordon Chavunduka
- Succeeded by: Levi Nyagura

F. W. Graham Hill is a Zimbabwean veterinary surgeon and academic. He was Vice Chancellor of the University of Zimbabwe from 1997 to 2002. As a researcher, he published on subjects such as the rabies vaccination and its epidemiology carcinoma in cattle, snake bites of small animals and diseases of the small intestines of dogs.

== Career ==
His term as Vice-Chancellor was marked by frequent staff strikes and student disturbances, and university and government crackdowns in response. He was accused of intervening in the academic process to favour senior government officials.

=== Post-retirement ===
Following his 2002 retirement, Prof. Hill took up farming but lost his new farm during fast-track land reform in 2005.

Educational offices
Preceded by Gordon Chavunduka	Vice–Chancellors and principals of the University of Zimbabwe; 1997 - 2002	Succeeded by Levi Nyagura
