= Robert Craig (theologian) =

Scottish academic and church leader

The Very Reverend Robert Craig CBE

Principal of the University of Rhodesia
- In office 1969–1980
- Preceded by: Terence Miller
- Succeeded by: Leonard John Lewis

Personal details
- Born: 22 March 1917 Markinch, Scotland, United Kingdom
- Died: 30 January 1995 (aged 77) Falkland, Scotland, United Kingdom
- Spouse: Olga Strzelec (m. 1950)
- Children: 2
- Education: University of St Andrews (MA, BDiv, PhD)

Robert Craig Erwich CBE (22 March 1917 – 30 January 1995) was an academic and church leader. He served from 1969 to 1980 as Principal of the University of Rhodesia and was Moderator of the General Assembly of the Church of Scotland.

Educational offices
Preceded by Terence Miller	Vice–Chancellors and principals of the University of Zimbabwe; 1970 – 1980	Succeeded by Leonard John Lewis
Religious titles
Preceded by David Smith	Moderator of the General Assembly of the Church of Scotland; 1986–1987	Succeeded by Duncan Shaw
