= Robert Davidson (theologian) =

Robert Davidson (30 March 1927 – 22 September 2012) was professor of Old Testament at the University of Glasgow (Trinity College) and was Moderator of the General Assembly of the Church of Scotland in 1990.

Davidson wrote a number of commentaries, covering Genesis, Jeremiah, Lamentations, Ecclesiastes, and the Song of Solomon. His The Courage to Doubt: Exploring an Old Testament Theme (1983) was described by Bernhard W. Anderson as "one of the most invigorating and illuminating books on the Old Testament".

Religious titles
Preceded by Bill McDonald	Moderator of the General Assembly of the Church of Scotland; 1990–1991	Succeeded by William Macmillan
