= University of Zimbabwe Farm =

- Town/City: Mazowe
- Province: Mashonaland Central
- Country: Zimbabwe
- Owner: University of Zimbabwe Faculty of Agriculture

The University of Zimbabwe Farm is a farm in Teviotdale, Mazowe District, north of Harare. It is operated by the University of Zimbabwe Faculty of Agriculture for teaching and research, including for field trials in crop science and animal science.
