= Marie Williams =

Marie Williams may refer to:

- Marie Imogene Williams (1870-?), American dentist and teacher
- Marie Selika Williams (c. 1849–1937), American coloratura soprano
- Marie Victoria Williams (1882–1955), South African classicist
