= James A. Whyte =

Scottish theologian, minister and academic

The Very Reverend James Whyte
- Moderator of the General Assembly
- Church: Church of Scotland
- In office: 1988 to 1989
- Predecessor: Duncan Shaw
- Successor: Bill McDonald
- Other posts: Principal of St Mary's College, St Andrews (1978–1982); Professor of Practical Theology and Christian Ethics, University of St Andrews (1958–1987)

Orders
- Ordination: 1945

Personal details
- Born: James Aitken Whyte; 28 January 1920
- Died: 17 June 2005 (aged 85)
- Denomination: Presbyterianism

James Aitken Whyte (28 January 1920 – 17 June 2005) was a Scottish theologian, presbyterian minister, and academic. He served as Moderator of the General Assembly of the Church of Scotland from 1988 to 1989.

== Biography ==
James Whyte was the second son of Andrew Whyte, a provision merchant in Leith, and his wife Barbaro Janet Pitillo Aitken. He was brought up in Edinburgh, attended Melville College and studied philosophy (he was awarded a First class honours MA degree in 1942) and divinity at the University of Edinburgh.

After his ordination in 1945 he spent three years as a chaplain to the first battalion of the Scots Guards, and then served as a parish minister at Dunollie Road Church in Oban (inducted 1948) and Mayfield North in Edinburgh (1954). In 1958 he was appointed Professor of Practical theology and Christian ethics at St Mary's College, the divinity faculty of the University of St Andrews and was Principal of St Mary's 1978–1982. His academic work focused mainly on the study of pastoral theology, liturgy and ecclesiastical architecture. He served as convenor of the General Assembly's Inter-Church Relations Committee. After his retirement from the university in 1987, he became Associate Minister of Hope Park, St Andrews. He was moderator of the 1988 General Assembly. In 1942 Whyte married his first wife Elisabeth Mill who died during his moderatorial year of 1988. He was survived by his second wife, primary school teacher Ishbel (née MacAuley) and his daughter and two sons from his first marriage.

== Public profile ==
James Whyte was an influential figure in the Church and in Scottish life, largely because of his reputation as a pastor. Four events brought him to the centre of public attention.

During his time as Principal of St Mary's it came to light that one of his students had previously served a sentence for murder. There followed a public controversy about whether this man could become a minister of the Church. Whyte argued on the basis of the Christian doctrine of forgiveness and persuaded the General Assembly not to block the ordination.

Prime Minister Margaret Thatcher was invited to address the 1988 General Assembly and gave the speech which the press dubbed the Sermon on the Mound, which attempted to suggest a theological basis for her style of capitalism. As Moderator, Whyte responded by presenting her with church reports on housing and poverty. He professed himself astonished at the public controversy which this relatively restrained censure unleashed. In his speech to the General Assembly the following year he recalled (referring to the Conservative baron Sir Nicholas Fairbairn): "one knight-errant looking for a windmill to tilt at even described me as 'Satanic' !"

As Moderator, Whyte was called on to preach at the memorial service for the victims of the Lockerbie disaster on 4 January 1989. This sermon was widely cited in the press and had a great impact:

"That such carnage of the young and of the innocent should have been willed by men in cold and calculated evil, is horror upon horror. What is our response to that?
The desire, the determination, that those who did this should be detected and, if possible, brought to justice, is natural and is right. The uncovering of the truth will not be easy, and evidence that would stand up in a court of law may be hard to obtain.
Justice is one thing. But already one hears in the media the word 'retaliation'. As far as I know, no responsible politician has used that word, and I hope none ever will, except to disown it. For that way lies the endless cycle of violence upon violence, horror upon horror. And we may be tempted, indeed urged by some, to flex our muscles in response, to show that we are men. To show that we are what? To show that we are prepared to let more young and more innocent die, to let more rescue workers labour in more wreckage to find the grisly proof, not of our virility, but of our inhumanity. That is what retaliation means."

The full text of this sermon was published in Laughter and Tears pp 92–5.

After the Dunblane Massacre in 1996 the families of the victims requested that Whyte conduct the memorial service on 9 October that year. The text of the sermon he preached on this occasion appears in The Dream and the Grace pp 125–9.

Whyte was renowned for his witty comments on Scottish public life. When the Conservative government privatised the Trustee Savings Bank in 1985 he wrote a three-sentence letter to The Scotsman: "Bankrobbery is the word we use to describe the crime of stealing from a bank. But what word can we use to describe the crime of stealing a bank? Words cannot describe the crimes of government!"

== Publications ==
- Laughter and Tears: Thoughts on Faith in the Face of Suffering, Edinburgh: St Andrew Press 1993, ISBN 0-7152-0682-6.
- The Dream and the Grace: Sermons on Healthy and Unhealthy Religion, Edinburgh: St Andrew Press 2001, ISBN 0-7152-0777-6.
- (co-edited) Worship Now: A Collection of Services and Prayer for Public Worship, vol 1 Edinburgh: St Andrew Press 1972 ISBN 0-7152-0199-9; vol 2 Edinburgh: St Andrew Press 1989, ISBN 0-7152-0633-8.
- An interview with Whyte: Kenneth Roy, "A Present for Mrs Thatcher" in Kenneth Roy, Conversations in a Small Country, Ayr: Carrick Publishing 1989, ISBN 0-946724-22-9, pp 41–8

== See also ==
- List of moderators of the General Assembly of the Church of Scotland

Religious titles
Preceded by Duncan Shaw	Moderator of the General Assembly of the Church of Scotland; 1988–1989	Succeeded by Bill McDonald
