= Bill McDonald (minister) =

Scottish minister

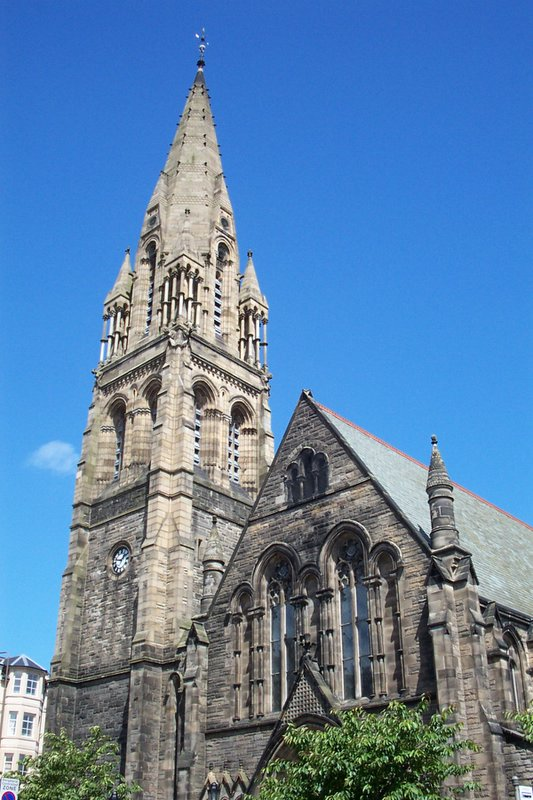
Mayfield Salisbury Church

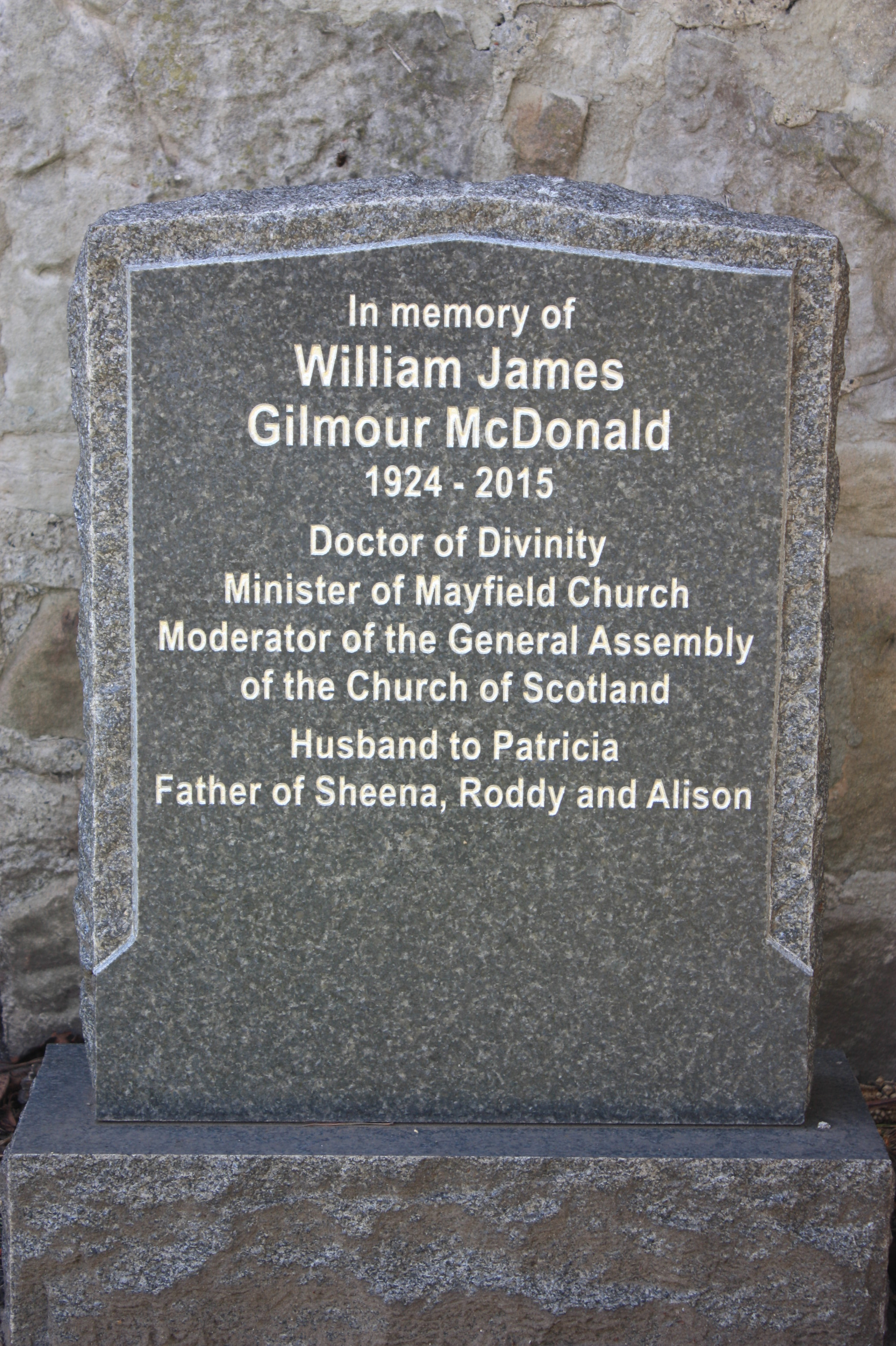
The grave of McDonald, Grange Cemetery, Edinburgh

William James Gilmour McDonald (13 June 1924 – 9 December 2015) was a Scottish minister. He served as Moderator of the General Assembly of the Church of Scotland in 1989. He presented BBC Radio Scotland's "Thought for the Day" for many years.

== Life ==
He was born on 3 June 1924 to Grace Kennedy Hunter and Hugh Gilmour McDonald. He was educated at Daniel Stewart's School, Edinburgh, and was school dux. He studied classics at the University of Edinburgh graduating with an MA, going on to take a further degree in divinity at the university.

In the final years of the Second World War he was a captain in the Royal Artillery in India in an anti-tank regiment. He then returned to Scotland, where, after assisting in St Cuthberts Church in Edinburgh for some years, he was ordained into the church at Limekilns, which also included being chaplain to Rosyth Dockyard. In 1959 he was translated to the Mayfield Salisbury Church in south Edinburgh succeeding Rev James Whyte. He remained there for the rest of his life. In Edinburgh he also served as chaplain to the Merchant Company of Edinburgh. He received an honorary doctorate (DD) from the University of Edinburgh in 1987. He retired in 1992 but would still speak occasionally at his former church.

He died in Edinburgh on 9 December 2015 and is buried in Grange Cemetery near his home. The grave lies near the north-west corner of the modern western extension.

== Family ==
In 1952 he married Margaret Patricia Watson, and together they had two daughters and a son; Alison, Sheena, a television presenter and journalist, and Roddy.

== Publications ==
- Words Thought and Said (2014)

Religious titles
Preceded by James A. Whyte	Moderator of the General Assembly of the Church of Scotland; 1989–1990	Succeeded by Robert Davidson
