= Levi Nyagura =

Zimbabwean academic administrator

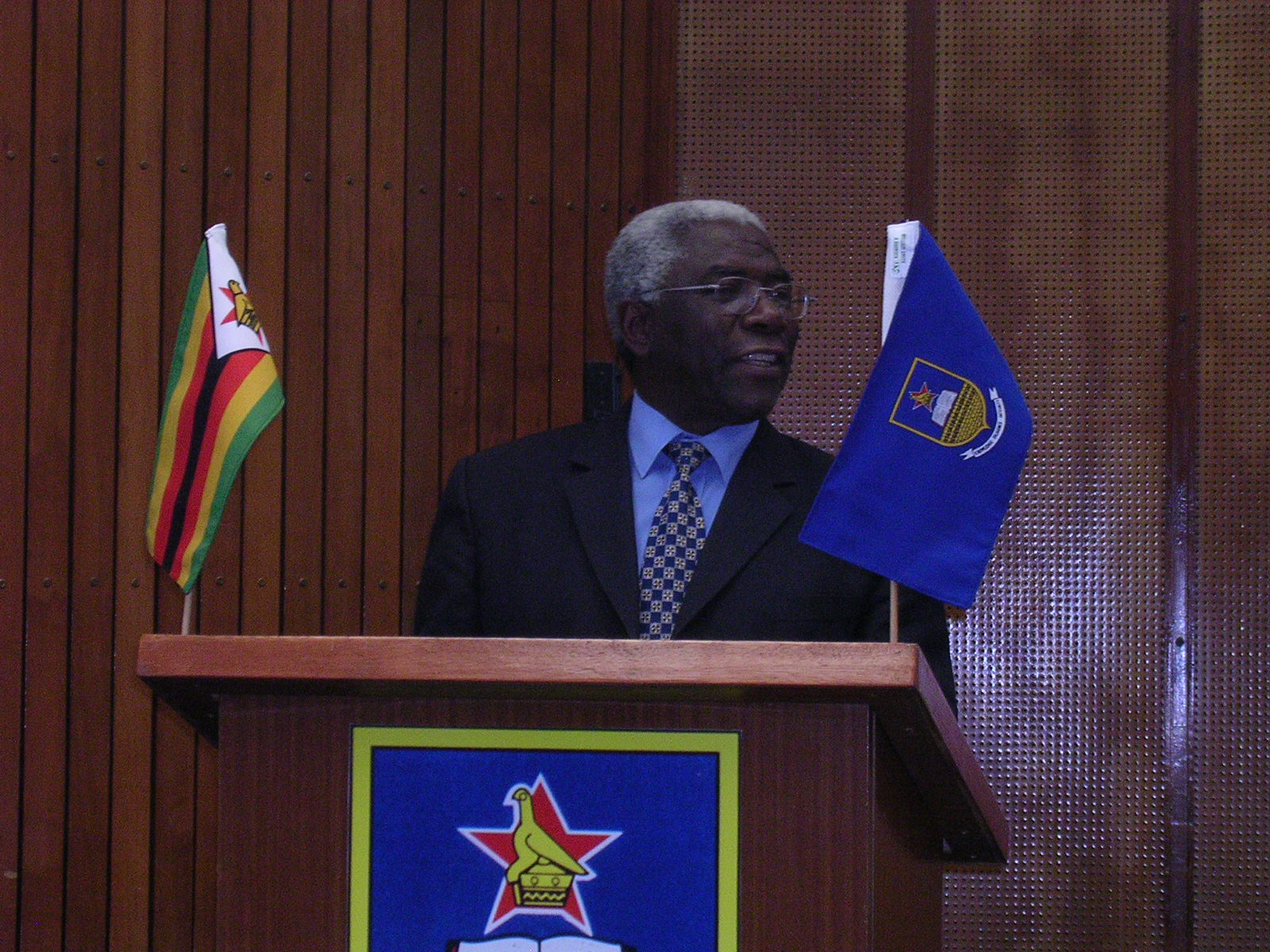

Vice Chancellor of the University of Zimbabwe
- In office January 2003 – 2018
- Preceded by: Graham Hill
- Succeeded by: Paul Mapfumo

Personal details
- Education: University of Rhodesia (BS); University of London (BS); University of Zimbabwe (GradCE); University of South Africa (MS); Southern Illinois University (PhD)

Levi Martin Nyagura is a Zimbabwean academic. He was appointed Vice Chancellor of the University of Zimbabwe in January 2003 and was subsequently reappointed for a second, third and a fourth term, the latter of which ended in mid 2018.

== Education and career ==
Levi Nyagura holds a PhD in Mathematics from Southern Illinois University, USA. He has a background as a Mathematics lecturer; he graduated with a Bachelor of Science Special Honours in Mathematics from the University of Rhodesia, then graduated with a BSc degree in Mathematics and Physics from University of London, United Kingdom. He went on to complete a Graduate Certificate of Education at the University of Zimbabwe and later an MSc degree in Mathematics with the University of South Africa before doing his PhD in the United States.

== Awards ==
Nyagura was awarded The Zimbabwe Institute of Management Public Services Manager of the Year (2005), The Zimbabwe Institute of Management Harare Regional Public Services Manager of the Year (2012) and The Zimbabwe Institute of Management Public Services Manager of the Year (2012).

== Controversies ==
Nyagura controversially awarded a PhD degree to Grace Mugabe in 2014.

In 2015 Nyagura controversially fired a senior university staffer Senior Assistant Registrar Ngaatendwe Takawira for allegedly procuring a small cap for Robert Mugabe that failed to fit during a graduation ceremony he officiated as Chancellor of the University of Zimbabwe in October 2015, a decision later reversed by a Zimbabwean court.

Nyagura has been widely criticized for presiding over the University of Zimbabwe's demise, characterized by a failure to retain staff because of poor remuneration, politicization of the institution, purges of independent minded academics, and purges of senior academics who protested Nyagura's leadership style. He reportedly boasts of his penchant for firing staff and not renewing contracts.

== Publications ==
Nyagura has published mainly on teacher and student performance in Zimbabwe's schools, as well as overall school performance.

Educational offices
Preceded by Graham Hill	Vice–Chancellors and principals of the University of Zimbabwe; 2003 –	Succeeded by incumbent
