= Sheena McDonald =

Scottish journalist and broadcaster

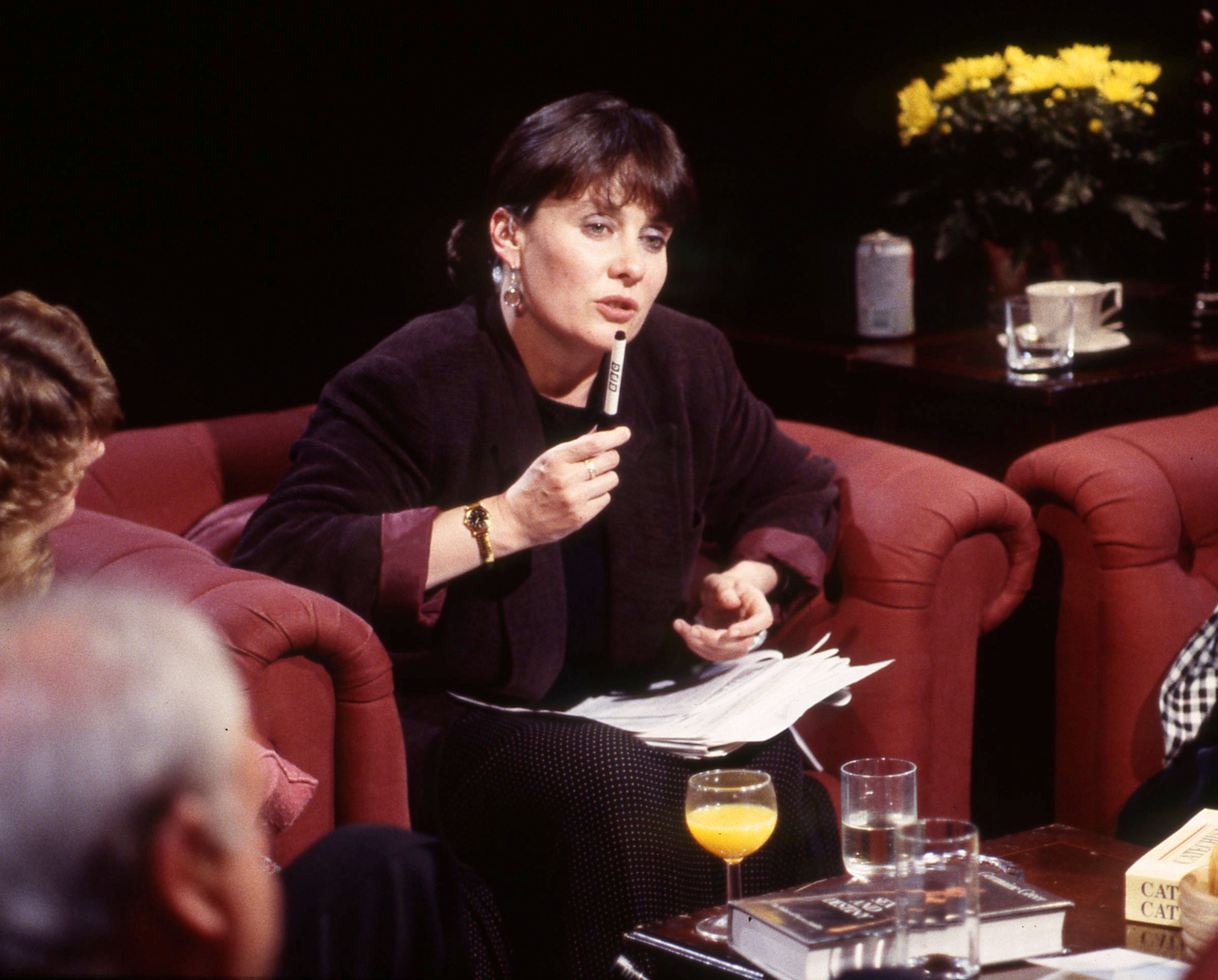
- Sheena McDonald hosting After Dark in 1994
- Born: 25 July 1954 (age 72); Dunfermline, Fife, Scotland
- Education: University of Edinburgh; University of Bristol
- Occupation: Professional Broadcaster
- Spouse: Allan Little (m. 2006)
- Father: Very Rev William J. G. McDonald

Sheena Elizabeth McDonald (born 25 July 1954, Dunfermline, Fife, Scotland) is a Scottish journalist and broadcaster.

== Early life ==
She was the daughter of Very Rev William J. G. McDonald, minister of Mayfield church in Edinburgh, and Moderator of the General Assembly of the Church of Scotland in 1989. He himself was a broadcaster, contributing to Thought for the Day for many years. She has a sister and a brother.

She was brought up in the Southside of Edinburgh, and was a pupil at George Watson's Ladies College, and then studied English at the University of Edinburgh from where she graduated in 1976 before gaining a postgraduate certificate in radio, film and television studies from the University of Bristol. Whilst at university in Edinburgh, she had a relationship with then-Rector and fellow student Gordon Brown.

== Broadcasting ==
In 1978 she began her professional broadcasting career as a producer and presenter at BBC Radio Scotland. She switched to television in 1981 as a presenter, continuity announcer and newsreader at STV, then went freelance in 1986, moving on to anchor such national radio and television news programmes as The World at One, Channel 4 News, The World This Week, After Dark and International Question Time and, in 1995, she received the first-ever 'Woman in Film and Television' Award. On 11 May 1995, McDonald chaired the panel discussion which followed the broadcast by Channel 4 of Allan Francovich's documentary The Maltese Double Cross, which challenged the official view of who was responsible for planting the bomb that brought down PanAm flight 103 over Lockerbie in Scotland on 21 December 1988.

== Journalism ==
McDonald co-founded the Edinburgh Festival Fringe newspaper Festival Times with Garfield Kennedy and wrote the "Central Belt" column for The List magazine between 1987 and 1989.

== Accident ==
In February 1999 she was struck by a police van on its way to a 999 call in Clerkenwell, London. She sustained head injuries, and it was almost five years before she returned to television, in a biographical documentary in which she spoke of her recuperation process and coming to terms with the psychological effects of her injury.

In 2019 she wrote a book Rebuilding Life after Brain Injury: Dreamtalk for a series presenting brain injury survivor stories, describing in detail her injury and the progression of her recovery, with contributions and commentary from her husband Allan Little and her rehabilitation specialist Gail Robinson.

== Personal life ==
She married BBC reporter Allan Little in 2006, having been together since 1993. They live in Edinburgh's New Town.

== Presenting roles ==
McDonald's presenting roles have included:

=== Television ===
- The Afternoon Show, BBC Scotland (1981)
- What's Your Problem? STV, (1981–1984)
- Scotland Today, STV (1984–1987)
- Votes for Woman (1988) 14 episodes
- The World This Week (1989–93)
- Scottish Women (1989–1992)
- After Dark (1989–2003) 3 episodes
- Fighting Talk, (1991)
- Right to Reply (1982–2001), 1991–93
- On the Record, BBC, circa 1993
- Channel 4 News
- Gimme Health, (1994)
- House to House (1995–98)
- Powerhouse (1998)
- Brain Injury - The Road to Rehabilitation, Disabilities Trust (2002)
- Who Am I Now?, Storyville, BBC Four (2004)
- Talking Point, Teachers' TV. (2005–6)
- Need to Know, Teachers' TV. (2007–8)
- General Assembly of the Church of Scotland (highlights), BBC Scotland (2007–2022)

=== Radio ===
- Mayfield community hospital radio (1970s, as a teenager)
- Joy to the World, Radio 4, (with Allan Little; Christmas morning broadcast, 1999)
- Something Understood, Radio 4, (2001-2)
- Talking Politics, Radio 4, (2000–08)
- The World Today, BBC World Service
- also isolated editions of The Week in Westminster, The World At One, The World This Weekend, The World Tonight (1994, 1996, 2000–03) and Pick of the Week (2002–07)
- Child of the Manse, Radio Scotland (2008) (subject)
