= Kathleen Coleman =

Zimbabwean classicist

Kathleen Coleman FBA
- Born: Zimbabwe

Academic background
- Education: University of Cape Town (BA); University of Rhodesia (BA); Lady Margaret Hall, Oxford (DPhil)

Academic work
- Discipline: Classics
- Institutions: Harvard University; University of Cape Town; Trinity College, Dublin

Kathleen M. Coleman FBA is an academic and writer who is the James Loeb Professor of the Classics at Harvard University. Her research interests include Latin literature, history and culture in the early Roman Empire, and arena spectacles. Her expertise in the latter area led to her appointment as Chief Academic Consultant for the 2000 film Gladiator.

== Career ==
Coleman was born and raised in Southern Rhodesia, which later was renamed Zimbabwe. She received her BA from the University of Cape Town in 1973, followed by a BA Hons from the University of Rhodesia in 1975 and a DPhil from Oxford in 1979. She taught at the University of Cape Town from 1979 to 1993 and held the chair of Latin at Trinity College, Dublin from 1993 to 1998. Since 1998 she has been a professor at Harvard College. In 2009 Coleman was elected an Honorary Member of the Society for the Promotion of Roman Studies and in 2012 a Corresponding Member of the Bayerische Akademie der Wissenschaften (Bavarian Academy of Sciences and Humanities). Coleman has been a Fellow of the Wissenschaftskolleg zu Berlin and the Alexander von Humboldt-Stiftung. In 2005 she was awarded the Joseph R. Levenson Teaching Prize for Senior Faculty by the Undergraduate Council of Harvard College, and in 2011 she served as president of the American Philological Association (now the Society for Classical Studies). Coleman is a member of the editorial boards of The American Journal of Philology, Eirene, Exemplaria Classica, Mnemosyne and Mnemosyne Supplements, and Rivista di Filologia e Istruzione Classica.

Due to her extensive knowledge of gladiatorial combat and its history, she acted as Chief Academic Consultant on the script of Ridley Scott's Gladiator. Professor Coleman purportedly found her work as a historical consultant to have had such little effect that she asked to be listed in the credits without any mention of her function. She has since contributed an essay entitled "The Pedant Goes to Hollywood: The Role of the Academic Consultant" to Martin Winkler's collection of essays on the topic.

She was elected as a corresponding Fellow of the British Academy in 2020. In 2021 she was elected to the American Philosophical Society.

She served as Professor-in-Charge for the Intercollegiate Center of Classical Studies (ICCS) for Fall 2021 and Spring 2022.

== Selected publications ==
=== Books ===
- Statius, Silvae IV: Text, Translation, and Commentary, Oxford University Press, 1988. ISBN 9780198140313.
- (ed., with J. Diggle, J. B. Hall, and H. D. Jocelyn) F. R. D. Goodyear. Papers on Latin Literature. London: Duckworth, 1992.
- Martial, Liber Spectaculorum: Text, Translation, and Commentary, Oxford University Press, 2006. ISBN 9780198144816.
- (ed., with Jocelyne Nelis-Clément) L’Organisation des spectacles dans le monde romain. Entretiens sur l’Antiquité Classique Tome LVIII. Vandoeuvres: Fondation Hardt, 2012.
- (ed.) Le jardin dans l’Antiquité. Entretiens sur l’Antiquité Classique Tome LX. Vandoeuvres: Fondation Hardt, 2014.
- (ed.) Albert’s Anthology. Loeb Classical Monographs 17. Cambridge, MA: Department of the Classics, Harvard University, 2017.
- (ed.) Images for Classicists. Loeb Classical Monographs 15. Cambridge, MA: Department of the Classics, Harvard University, 2015.

=== Book chapters and journal articles ===
- "Vergil, Aeneid 1, 200–1." Proceedings of the African Classical Associations 13 (1975): 9–10.
- "Siluae 4.9: a Statian name-game." Proceedings of the African Classical Associations 14 (1978): 9–10.
- "The persona of Catullus’ phaselus." Greece & Rome 28 (1981): 68–72.
- "Tanta licentia, tanta legum contemptio." Akroterion 26 (1981): 4–17 (with T. W. Bennett; repr. from South African Law Journal).
- "Vibius Maximus and the writing of history." Proceedings of the African Classical Associations 16 (1982): 25–27.
- "Manilius’ monster." Hermes 111 (1983): 226–32.
- "An African at Rome: Statius Siluae 4.5." Proceedings of the African Classical Associations 17 (1983): 85–99.
- "Art in the daily life of the Romans." Lantern 33.1 (1984): 35–40.
- "The emperor Domitian and literature." In Aufstieg und Niedergang der römischen Welt II 32.5, ed. by Wolfgang Haase, 3087–15. Berlin; New York: De Gruyter, 1986.
- "Fatal charades: Roman executions staged as mythological enactments." Journal of Roman Studies 80 (1990): 44–73.
- "Tiresias the judge: Ovid, Met. 3. 321–38." Classical Quarterly n.s. 40 (1990): 571–77.
- "Launching into history: aquatic displays in the early Empire." Journal of Roman Studies 83 (1993): 48–74.
- " ‘The contagion of the throng’: absorbing violence in the Roman world." The European Review 5 (1997): 401–17, reprinted with additional plates in Hermathena 164 (1998): 65–88.
- "Martial Book 8 and the politics of AD 93." Proceedings of the Leeds International Latin Seminar 10 (1998): 337–57.
- "Latin literature after AD 96: change or continuity?" American Journal of Ancient History 15 (1990 [2000]): 19–39.
- "The pedant goes to Hollywood: the role of the academic consultant." In Gladiator: Film and History, ed. by Martin Winkler, 45–52. Oxford: Blackwell, 2004 Expanded version of Swedish original = "Pedanten åker till Hollywood. En rådgivande akademikers roll." Filmhäftet 29.2 (2001): 4–6.
- "Apollo’s speech before the battle of Actium: Propertius 4.6.37–54." In Literature, Art, History: Studies on Classical Antiquity and Tradition in Honour of W. J. Henderson, ed. by A. F. Basson and W. J. Dominik, 37–45. Frankfurt: Peter Lang, 2003.
- "Stones in the forest: epigraphic allusion in the Siluae." In The Poetry of Statius, ed. by J. J. L. Smolenaars, H.-J. van Dam, and R. R. Nauta, 19–43. Leiden: Brill, 2008.
- "C. P. Cavafy and Douglas Livingstone: an African legacy." In “Imagination and Logos”: Essays on C. P. Cavafy, ed. by Panagiotis Roilos, 107–20. Cambridge, Mass.: Harvard University Press, 2010.
- "Valuing others in the gladiatorial barracks." In Valuing Others, ed. by Ralph M. Rosen and Ineke Sluiter, 419–45. Penn–Leiden Colloquium on Ancient Values V. Leiden: Brill, 2010.
- "Bureaucratic language in the correspondence between Pliny and Trajan." Transactions of the American Philological Association 142.2 (2012): 189–23.
- "Antiquity’s undertone: classical resonances in the poetry of Douglas Livingstone." In South Africa, Greece, Rome: Classical Confrontations, ed. by Grant Parker, 410–41. Cambridge: Cambridge University Press, 2017.
- "The fragility of evidence: torture in ancient Rome." In Confronting Torture: Essays on the Ethics, Legality, History, and Psychology of Torture Today, ed. by Scott A. Anderson and Martha C. Nussbaum, 105–19. Chicago: University of Chicago Press, 2018.
