= David Wardle =

Professor David Wardle
- Born: 23 December 1959 (age 66); Nottingham, UK
- Occupation: Classical scholar

Academic background
- Education: Oriel College, Oxford
- Thesis: An historical commentary on Suetonius' Life of Caligula, with introduction (1989)
- Doctoral advisor: Miriam T. Griffin, Fergus Millar

Academic work
- Discipline: Ancient history
- Institutions: University of Cape Town, South Africa
- Doctoral students: Jeffrey Murray
- Notable works: Suetonius: Life of Augustus, Cicero On Divination Book I

David Wardle (born 23 December 1959) is King George V Professor Emeritus of Classics and Ancient History, as well as a former Acting Dean in the Faculty of Humanities, at the University of Cape Town.

== Academic career ==
Born 23 December 1959 and educated in Nottingham, UK, Wardle took an MA and a DPhil from Oxford University in the sub-faculty of Literae Humaniores. After a brief stint working for the United Kingdom Atomic Energy Authority, he came to UCT as a lecturer in August 1990 and was appointed Professor in Classics and Ancient History in 2006.

Wardle's academic specialisation lies in the field of Roman imperial history and historiography which he combines with an interest in ancient Roman religion.

Besides numerous articles and book reviews, Wardle is the author of four monographs, which have taken the form of commentaries on key texts from the Classical period: Suetonius’ Life of Caligula (Brussels, 1994), Valerius Maximus’ Memorable Deeds and Sayings (Oxford, 1998), Cicero’s On Divination (Oxford, 2006), and Suetonius: Life of Augustus (Oxford, 2014) and Suetonius: Life of Julius Caesar (Oxford, 2025.

Wardle is also a former editor of the Classics journal, Acta Classica.

In 2017, Wardle was appointed Acting Dean of the Faculty of Humanities, at the University of Cape Town.
