= Gordon Chavunduka =

Zimbabwean sociologist (1931–2013)

Vice Chancellor of the University of Zimbabwe
- In office 1992–1996
- Preceded by: Walter Kamba
- Succeeded by: Graham Hill

Personal details
- Born: 16 August 1931 Southern Rhodesia
- Died: 11 January 2013 (aged 81) Harare, Zimbabwe

Gordon Lloyd Chavunduka (c.16 August 1931 – 11 January 2013) was a Zimbabwean sociologist and traditional healer.

== Biography ==
Chavunduka was an agricultural instructor until he resigned to begin a career in sociology. He then obtained a BA in sociology and social anthropology from the University of California, Los Angeles, a MA in sociology from the Victoria University of Manchester, and a PhD in sociology from the University of London. He became a lecturer in sociology at the University of Rhodesia in 1966.

In 1969, he helped to form the National People's Union and became its first president. It disbanded in 1971 to help form the African National Council, and Chavunduka became its secretary-general. In 1976, he became the head of its research department.

He served as a member of Abel Muzorewa's delegation to the 1979 Lancaster House Conference that led to Zimbabwe's independence. He has published several books on traditional medicine.

Prof. Chavunduka was Vice Chancellor of the University of Zimbabwe from 1992 to 1996. After his retirement from the university, he served as president of the Zimbabwe National Traditional Healers Association. He was a great influence to Christopher Chetsanga.

== Death ==
Chavunduka died on 11 January 2013 at the age of 81 in Harare, after a short illness.

Educational offices
Preceded by Walter Kamba	Vice–Chancellors and principals of the University of Zimbabwe; 1992 – 1996	Succeeded by Graham Hill
