= Jasper Griffin =

British classicist and academic (1937–2019)

Jasper Griffin FBA
- Born: 29 May 1937
- Died: 22 November 2019 (aged 82)
- Occupation: Classical scholar
- Spouse: Miriam T. Dressler (m. 1960; died 2018)

Academic background
- Education: Christ's Hospital
- Alma mater: Balliol College, Oxford

Academic work
- Discipline: Classical literature
- Institutions: Balliol College, Oxford

Jasper Griffin FBA (29 May 1937 – 22 November 2019) was a British classicist and academic. He was Public Orator and Professor of Classical Literature in the University of Oxford from 1992 until 2004.

== Early life ==
Griffin was born on 29 May 1937. He was educated on a scholarship at Christ's Hospital, a private school in Horsham, West Sussex. He read Classical Moderations and Greats at Balliol College, Oxford between 1956 and 1960. He graduated with a first class Bachelor of Arts degree. He was Jackson Fellow at Harvard University from 1960 to 1961 where he undertook research in early Latin poets.

== Academic career ==
On his return to the University of Oxford, Griffin became Dyson Junior Research Fellow at Balliol College (1961–63), tutorial fellow in Classics (1963–2004), and senior fellow (2000–04). He is the originator of the word "agostic" used by the organometallic chemist Malcolm Green to describe C-H-M interactions.

== Personal life ==
Griffin's wife of more than fifty years, Dr Miriam T. Griffin (née Dressler), was also a noteworthy classicist. Their three daughters, Julia, Miranda and Tamara, survive them.

== Honours ==
Griffin was elected a Fellow of the British Academy in 1986.

== Publications ==
=== Author ===
- Homer: the Odyssey (Cambridge: Cambridge University Press, 1987, 2nd edn 2004)
- Homer (Oxford: Oxford University Press, 1980, 2nd edn, London: Bristol Classical Press, 2001)
- Virgil (2nd edn, London: Bristol Classical Press, 2001)
- The art of snobbery (London: Robinson, 1998)
- Latin poets and Roman life (London: Duckworth, 1985, 2nd edn, London: Bristol Classical Press, 1994)
- The mirror of myth: classical themes & variations (London: Faber and Faber, 1986)
- Homer on life and death (Oxford: Clarendon Press; New York: Oxford University Press, 1980)
- Snobs (Oxford; New York: Oxford University Press, 1982)

=== Editor ===
- Homer: Iliad, Book nine (Oxford: Clarendon Press, 1995)
- Sophocles revisited: essays presented to Sir Hugh Lloyd-Jones (Oxford: Oxford University Press, 1999)
- The Oxford history of the classical world (with John Boardman and Oswyn Murray, Oxford: Oxford University Press, 1986), subsequently published as The Oxford history of Greece and the Hellenistic world (Oxford: Oxford University Press, 1991, 2nd edn 2001, illustrated edn 2001) and The Oxford history of the Roman world (with John Boardman and Oswyn Murray, Oxford: Oxford University Press, 1991, 2nd edn 2001, illustrated edn 2001)
