= University of Zimbabwe Lake Kariba Research Station =

Research station

The University of Zimbabwe Lake Kariba Research Station is a research station in the Nyamhunga suburb of Kariba. It is operated by the University of Zimbabwe. Station staff have published research on topics such as fish diets and population dynamics and climate change.
