= Alexander Petrie (classicist) =

Alexander Petrie (26 October 1881 – 1 December 1979) was the first Professor of Classics at the University of Natal (then called the Natal University College).

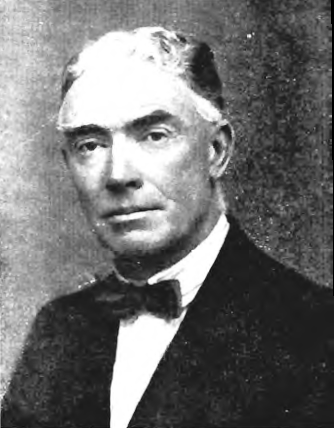
Alexander Petrie, Natal University College Magazine, 1934.

== Academic career ==
Petrie graduated with an MA from Aberdeen University in 1903, where he received the Liddle Prize for Latin Verse (1902). He won the Ferguson Scholarship in 1904. He also attended Trinity College, Cambridge, graduating with a BA from the University of Cambridge in 1907. He was appointed lecturer in Greek at Aberdeen in 1908, but in 1910 moved to South Africa to take up the position of Professor of Classics at the recently formed Natal University College, where he stayed until his retirement in 1946. He was made Professor Emeritus in 1948, and in 1950 the University of Natal awarded him the degree of D.Litt. (honoris causa). After his retirement he continued occasional teaching at the University of Natal, as well as at Rhodes University and the University of the Witwatersrand. He was a founding member of the Classical Association of South Africa in 1927, along with the Hon. J. H. Hofmeyr and Professors C. S. Edgar, W. Rollo, W. Ritchie and T. J. Haarhoff. He was later elected joint Honorary President of the Classical Association of South Africa, along with T. J. Haarhoff in 1956.

== Publications ==
- "Epitaphs in Phrygian Greek", in: W. M. Ramsay (ed.), Studies in the History and Art of the Eastern Provinces of the Roman Empire (1906), 119–136.
- Poems of South African History, A.D. 1497–1910 (1918)
- A Latin reader for matriculation and other students: with notes and a vocabulary (1918, reprinted 1925, 1959, 1963, 1966)
- The Speech Against Leocrates (1922)
- "A Bibliography of South African Literature" in the Cambridge History of English Literature, vol. XIV (1922)
- An Introduction to Roman History, Literature and Antiquities (1926, reprinted 1963)
- An Introduction to Greek History, Literature and Antiquities (1932, reprinted 1962; also translated into Spanish and published as: Introducción al estudio de Grecia, Mexico : Fondo de Cultura económica, 1946)
- Presbyterian Church of Pietermaritzburg, 1850–1950: centenary review (1950)
- "Professor T. J. Haarhoff – an Appreciation" Acta Classica 1 (1958), 9–13.
- Saint Andrew's Day, 1919–1961 and other verses (1962)
- Scottish Wit and Humour: dedicated to all victims of a surgical operation (1963)

He also contributed Greek verse to Johannes Harrower (ed.), Flosculi Graeci Boreales (1907).

== Legacy ==
The Petrie Prize was established and awarded to the best third-year student in classics, Latin, or Greek, on both the Durban and Pietermaritzburg campuses of the university.

A portrait of Petrie by Rosa Hope was hung in the council chamber of the university on the Pietermaritzburg campus, it was later removed, as Petrie had not been a Chancellor of the university, and was hung in the lecture theatre nearest the Classics department on the Pietermaritzburg campus. It was later moved to the Whiteley Library in the Classics department on the Howard College campus of the university.

A student residence at the University of Natal (later the University of KwaZulu-Natal) was named after him.

Edgar Brookes dedicated his book A History of the University of Natal (1967) to Petrie.
