= Walter Kamba =

Zimbabwean lawyer and academic (1931–2007)

Vice Chancellor of the University of Zimbabwe
- In office 1981–1992
- Preceded by: Leonard John Lewis
- Succeeded by: Gordon Chavunduka

Personal details
- Born: 6 September 1931 Southern Rhodesia
- Died: 6 September 2007 (aged 76) Zimbabwe

Walter Kamba (6 September 1931 – 18 May 2007) was a Zimbabwean lawyer and academic, one of the few black lawyers practicing in the then British colony of Rhodesia. He fled following the Unilateral Declaration of Independence by Prime Minister Ian Smith. He joined the Faculty of Law at the University of Dundee, Scotland in 1969, where he taught Jurisprudence and Comparative Law. He was promoted to Senior Lecturer and in 1977 became Dean of the Faculty. He was awarded an honorary degree by the University in 1982 as part of its centenary celebrations.

He served as a legal advisor to the ZANU-PF and PF-ZAPU delegations at the Lancaster House Conference. After independence, he served as principal and vice-chancellor of the University of Zimbabwe from 1981 to 1992. Under his tenure, the University expanded its overall size, its intake of black Zimbabweans and the range of academic disciplines offered. He resigned in a controversial speech at the 1992 graduation, citing government interference and threats to academic freedom.

His wife Angeline, who died in 2017 aged 81, was a distinguished national and international administrator.

Educational offices
| Preceded by Leonard John Lewis | Vice–Chancellors and principals of the University of Zimbabwe; 1981 – 1992 | Succeeded by Gordon Chavunduka |
