= Leonard John Lewis =

British academic

Leonard Lewis

Principal of the University of Zimbabwe
- In office 1980–1981
- Preceded by: Robert Craig
- Succeeded by: Walter Kamba

Leonard John Lewis was a British academic. He worked as an educationalist in Nigeria and was a lecturer (later professor) at the Institute of Education of the University of London. He served as Principal of the University of Zimbabwe for the transition to Zimbabwe's independence, despite his somewhat controversial views on education and politics. He has published a number of books on education policy.

Educational offices
Preceded by Robert Craig	Vice–Chancellors and principals of the University of Zimbabwe; 1980 – 1981	Succeeded by Walter Kamba
