= Terence Miller =

British geologist (1918–2015)

Principal of the University College of Rhodesia
- In office 1967–1969
- Preceded by: Walter Adams
- Succeeded by: Robert Craig

Personal details
- Born: 16 January 1918 Cambridge, England, United Kingdom
- Died: 17 January 2015 (aged 97) Norfolk, England, United Kingdom
- Spouse: Inga Priestman (m. 1944; died 2012)
- Education: Jesus College, Cambridge

Terence George Miller (16 January 1918 – 17 January 2015) was a British academic and professor of geology.

Born to an English father and Scottish mother, Miller was educated at The Perse School in Cambridge and at Jesus College, Cambridge, where he read natural sciences. After serving as a squadron commander in the Glider Pilot Regiment during the Second World War, he completed a Harkness Fellowship before embarking on a five-year period as a research fellow at Jesus College. Appointed a demonstrator in Geology at the University College of North Staffordshire (now Keele University) in 1949, he eventually rose to become professor of geography at Reading University in 1965.

Two years later, in 1967, he was appointed Principal of the University College of Rhodesia. During this period, his liberal political views brought him hate mail and he rapidly came into conflict with the government. When in 1969 Rhodesia declared itself a republic, with a racist constitution, Prof. Miller resigned his position and returned to Britain, rejoining the staff at Reading as a visiting professor before being appointed Director of the newly formed Polytechnic of North London in 1971. There, his time in Rhodesia was perversely held against him, with student activists on campus interpreting it as evidence of racism and "fascism". Facing frequent calls for his dismissal, Miller developed a combative and forceful management style that allowed him to uphold standards while protecting anti- and non-Marxist staff from harassment.

Miller was one of a number of distinguished geologists who contributed to the UK's effort in the Second World War, as Major T. G. Miller. After retiring in 1980, he lived with his wife Inga firstly in Falmouth and then in Sedgeford, Norfolk. He died on 17 January 2015.

Educational offices
Preceded by Sir Walter Adams	Vice–Chancellors and principals of the University of Zimbabwe; 1967 – 1969	Succeeded by Robert Craig
