= Walter Adams (historian) =

British historian and educationalist

Sir Walter Adams CMG OBE
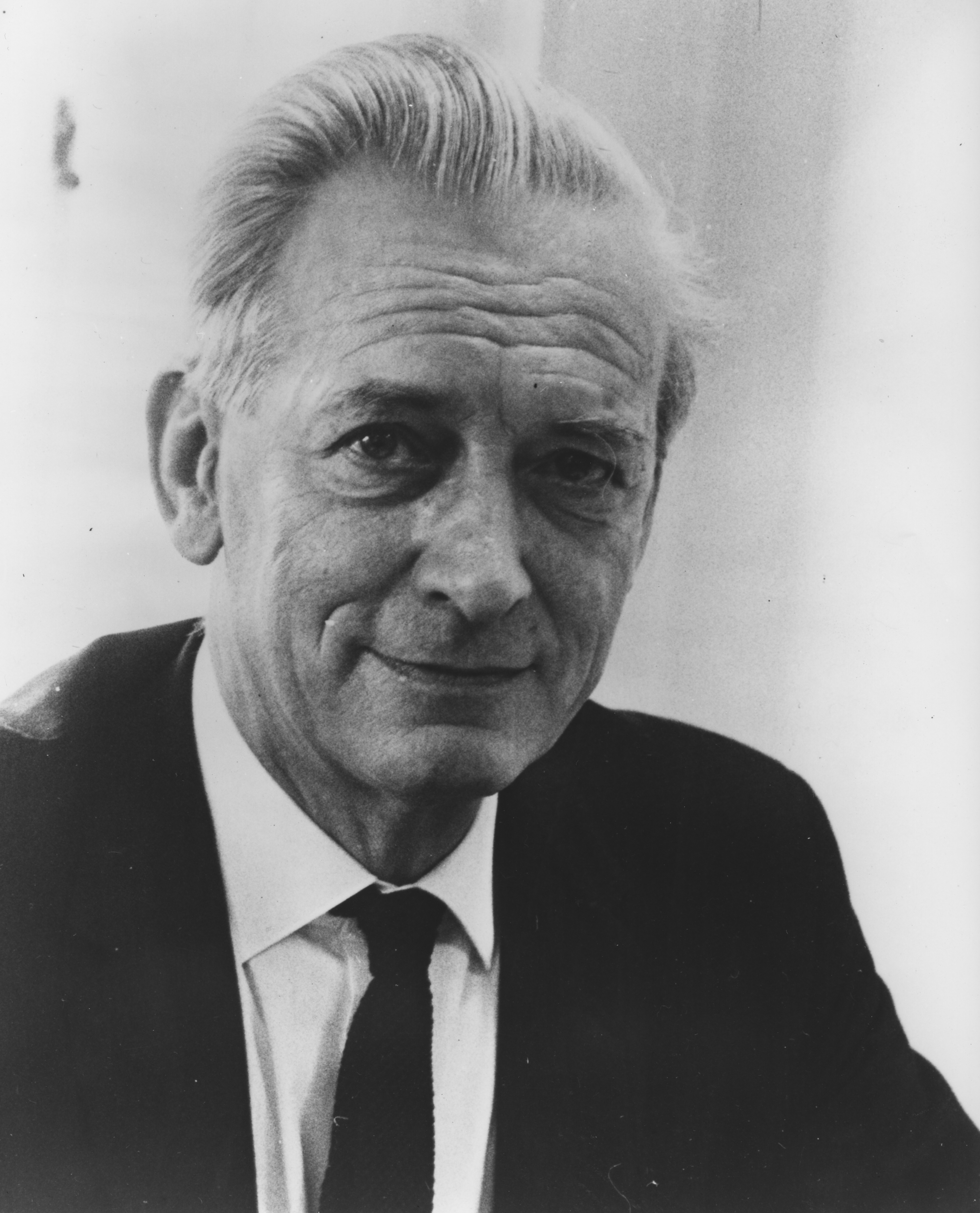
- Walter Adams, c. 1965

Director of the London School of Economics
- In office 1967–1974
- Preceded by: Sydney Caine
- Succeeded by: Ralf Dahrendorf

Principal of the University College of Rhodesia
- In office December 1955 – 1967
- Preceded by: William Rollo
- Succeeded by: Terence Miller

Personal details
- Born: 16 December 1906 United Kingdom
- Died: 21 May 1975 (aged 68–69) Salisbury (now Harare), Rhodesia
- Education: University College London

Sir Walter Adams CMG OBE (16 December 1906 – 21 May 1975) was a British historian and educationalist.

Adams was educated at University College London, and was a lecturer in history at the same institution from 1926 to 1934. He was a Rockefeller Fellow in the United States from 1929 to 1930, and the organising secretary of the Second International Congress of the History of Science and Technology in 1931.

He served as secretary of the Academic Assistance Council from 1933 to 1938, and of the London School of Economics from 1938 to 1946; he also served as Deputy Head of the British Political Warfare Mission in the United States from 1942 to 1944, and as Assistant Deputy Director-General of the Political Intelligence Department of the Foreign Office in 1945. His role in the Academic Assistance Council and the organisation of a public meeting at the Albert Hall at which Albert Einstein spoke in October 1933 is portrayed by the actor James Musgrave in the Netflix drama-documentary "Einstein and the Bomb."

After the war, he served as secretary of the Inter-University Council for Higher Education in the Colonies from 1946 to 1955; he was the principal of the College of Rhodesia and Nyasaland from 1955 to 1966, and subsequently Director of the London School of Economics from 1967 to 1974.

His appointment as Director of LSE caused a series of student protests from 1966 to 1969 due to his links with Rhodesia.

Adams was appointed Officer of the Order of the British Empire (OBE) in 1945, and Companion of the Order of St Michael and St George (CMG) in 1952. He was knighted in 1970.

In May 1975, he returned to Rhodesia to receive an honorary doctorate from the Rhodesian University College, where he had served as principal. He died of a heart attack during the visit.

Educational offices
Preceded by William Rollo	Vice–Chancellors and principals of the University of Zimbabwe; 1955 – 1966	Succeeded by Terence Miller
Preceded by Sydney Caine	Director of the London School of Economics; 1967 – 1974	Succeeded by Ralf Dahrendorf
