= Sermon on the Mound =

1988 address by Margaret Thatcher to the General Assembly of the Church of Scotland

"Sermon on the Mound" is the name given by the Scottish press to an address made by British prime minister Margaret Thatcher to the General Assembly of the Church of Scotland on Saturday, 21 May 1988. This speech, which laid out the relationship between her religious and political thinking, proved highly controversial.

== Background ==
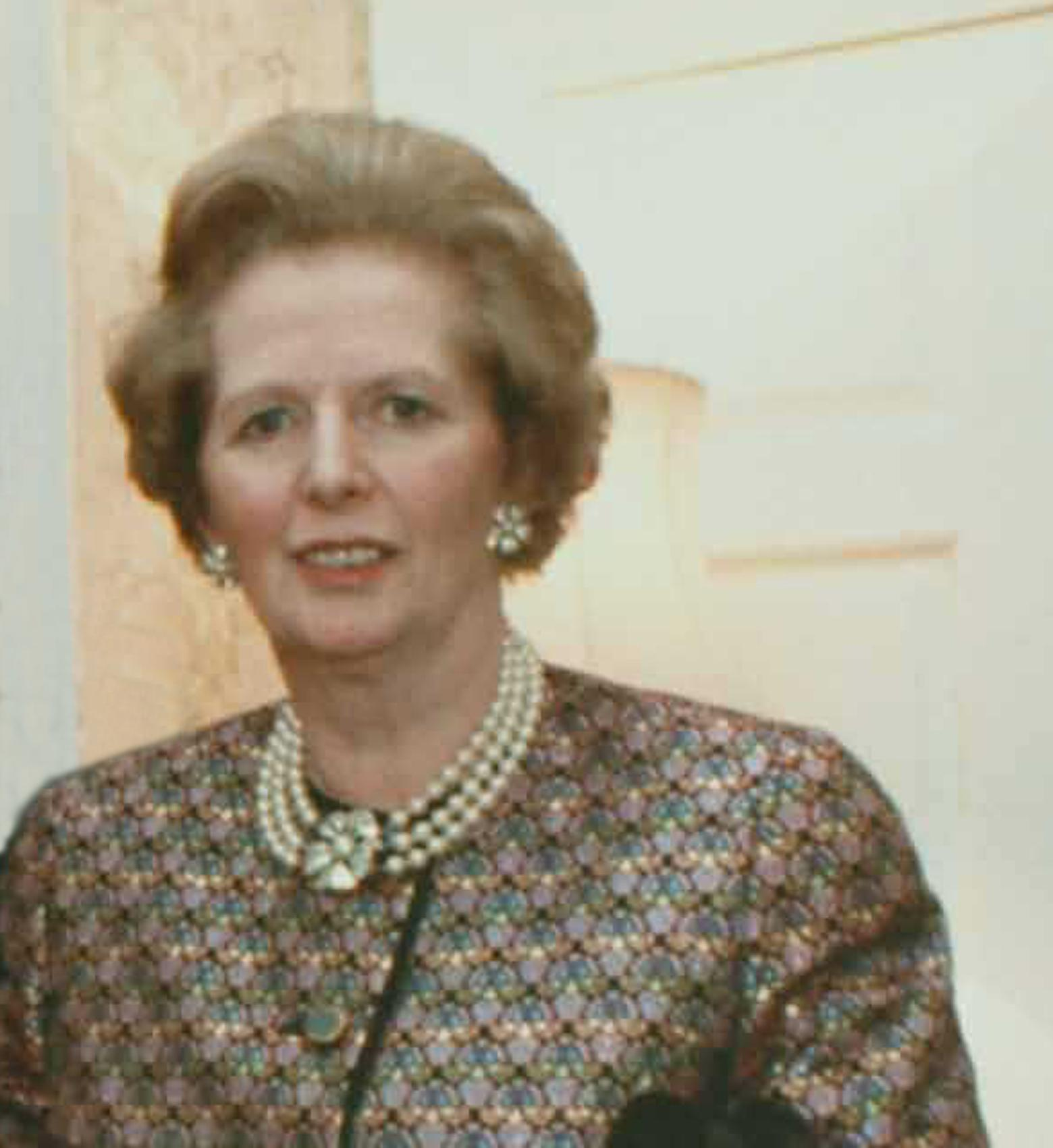
Margaret Thatcher in 1988

Thatcher has been described by historian Eliza Filby as Britain's most religious prime minister since William Ewart Gladstone. She was raised as a Methodist and had preached as such in her Oxford years, but later she became a member of the Church of England. She understood her political convictions in terms of her faith. However, as prime minister, she repeatedly found herself in conflict with the churches; she was reportedly "livid" when the Archbishop of Canterbury was critical of the Falklands War, and she saw the Church of England's Faith in the City report, with its theological criticism of her social policies, as an illegitimate intrusion of the church into the political sphere.

In Scotland, Thatcher was particularly unpopular, and in the 1987 general election, the Conservatives lost more than half of their seats north of the border. In May 1988, Thatcher chose Scotland as the setting for a televised speech before the Church of Scotland's General Assembly, which may have been co-authored by her chief policy advisor, Brian Griffiths, and which was intended in part as a response to Faith in the City. She was the first prime minister ever to address the body directly. (Note: On 17 May 2008, Gordon Brown became the first Labour prime minister to address the assembly, and the press compared the two speeches closely.)

The assembly had convened for its first session of the year at 10 a.m. but paused its business to allow the timing of the Prime Minister's address to coincide with the television schedule. (Note: The minutes of the assembly record: The General Assembly suspended their sitting at 10.50 a.m. until 11.10 a.m. On resuming, The Right Hon. Margaret Thatcher, Prime Minister of Her Majesty's Government, being present, was invited to address the General Assembly. The Rev. P. Reamonn entered his dissent to which the Rev. A. K. Sorensen, the Rev. S. D. McQuarrie, the Rev. J. Ainslie, the Rev. R. H. Drummond, and the Rev. C. M. Anderson adhered. The following reasons for dissent were adduced: -- that it would have been more appropriate for the invitation to have been at the time of presentation of the Report of the Committee on Church and Nation when there would also have been more opportunity for a fuller response; that the Prime Minister had come to the Assembly to use it for her own political purposes, and to preach a gospel other than the Christian Gospel; that the Prime Minister represented a Government which has caused great suffering and deep distress for many people; that the action of the Moderator had presented the Assembly with a fait accompli. The Moderator then welcomed the Prime Minister, invited her to address the General Assembly, and thereafter thanked her and presented her with a memento of her visit. The minutes contain no account of the content of the speech itself.) She appeared in a Tory-blue suit and hat. Even before she spoke, some in the church objected to her being given this platform because of the damage done to Scottish communities by the closure of coal mines and shipyards. After welcoming her to the assembly, the Moderator, James Whyte, professor of practical theology at St Andrews, asked, following the formal procedure, if it was the will of the assembly that the Prime Minister be permitted to speak. She had to wait while six parish ministers came forward to register their dissent. (Note: Rev. Stuart McQuarrie quipped from the podium, "Moderator, I am minister of a place called Toryglen, and I wish to record my dissent.")

== Popular title ==
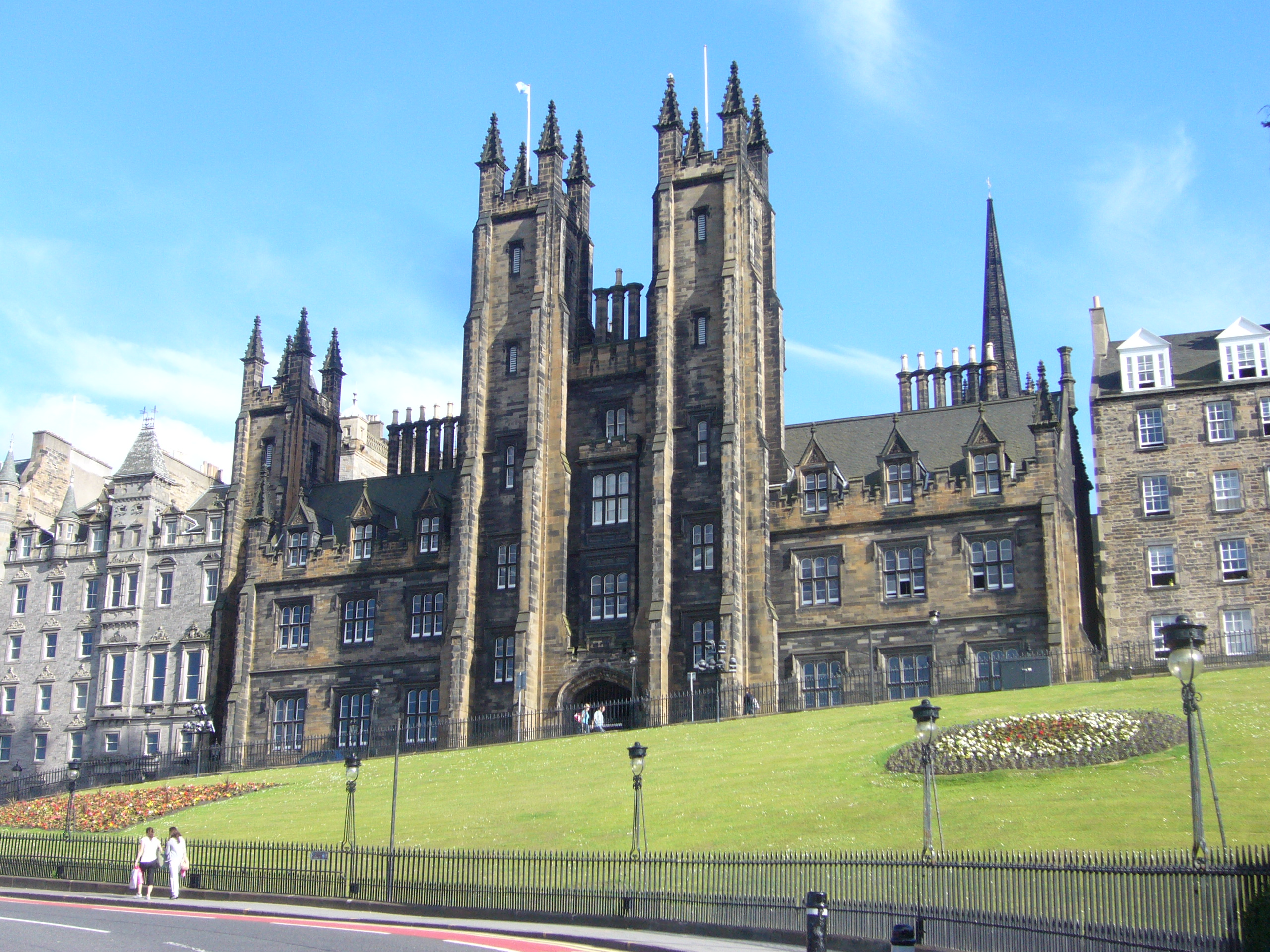
New College (pictured in 2010), on the Mound in Edinburgh, which houses the Church of Scotland's Assembly Hall

The name "Sermon on the Mound" is a play on Jesus's Sermon on the Mount and the artificial hill in Edinburgh called the Mound, on which the church's Assembly Hall stands. It reflects the sermon-like tone of her address, which is normally discouraged in debates in the assembly. It has also been seen in the context that Thatcher was preaching to a church and nation that had mostly rejected her ideology.

The Margaret Thatcher Foundation, which reproduces the full text of the speech on its website, characterises the nickname "Sermon on the Mound" as tasteless. (Note: Editorial comment above the text of the speech: "Tastelessly, opponents nicknamed the speech 'the Sermon on the Mound'") In an interview with Scotland on Sunday in October 1988, Thatcher herself said, "it was not a sermon on the mount, it was Scotland asking me fully and frankly to give my beliefs, doing me the supreme courtesy and honour of asking me and listening with great attention."

== Themes ==
In the address, Thatcher offered a theological justification for her ideas on capitalism and the market economy.

=== Individualism ===
One key idea in Thatcher's political thinking was individualism. In a 1987 interview she said that "there is no such thing as society". Thatcher's supporters later said the quote was taken out of context, and in her memoirs Thatcher said it had been "distorted beyond recognition". Her views on individualism align with the theme of individual personal salvation in the evangelical Wesleyan tradition in which she was raised. A main theme of the speech is, therefore, the individual, both in the context of spirituality and of economic agency. Citing a view that "Christianity is about spiritual redemption, not social reform", she said that, while it would be wrong to see these as opposites, Christians should emphasise personal responsibility.

Quoting from the hymn "I Vow to Thee, My Country" (which had never been part of the Scottish tradition of worship (Note: It is not to be found in the hymnbook in use at the time: Church Hymnary (3rd ed.). The faux pas of citing from English rather than Scottish hymnody has been identified as an example of cultural insensitivity in the speech.)), she said: "It goes on to speak of 'another country I heard of long ago' whose King can't be seen and whose armies can't be counted, but 'soul by soul and silently her shining bounds increase'. Not group by group, or party by party, or even church by church—but soul by soul—and each one counts."

=== Choice ===
Choice played a significant part in Thatcherite reforms, and she claimed it as a Christian value by linking it with the idea that Christ chose to lay down his life and that all individuals have the God-given right to choose between good and evil. Thus theological ideas of free will flowed together in her thinking with free-market ideas of consumer choice.

=== Democracy ===
The speech contains an ambivalence towards democracy. It points out that "nowhere in the Bible is the word democracy mentioned" and, ideally, when Christians meet, the purpose should not be "to ascertain what is the mind of the majority but what is the mind of the Holy Spirit – something which may be quite different". Nevertheless, she professes to be an enthusiast for democracy because, more than any other system, it safeguards the value of the individual and restrains the abuse of power, "and that is a Christian concept." Thus democracy is linked in her thinking to individualism rather than to community.

=== Wealth production ===
A central pillar of Thatcherite economics was the role of private enterprise in producing wealth. In the speech to the assembly, she linked this to biblical commands: "We are told we must work and use our talents to create wealth. 'If a man will not work he shall not eat' wrote St. Paul to the Thessalonians. Indeed, abundance rather than poverty has a legitimacy which derives from the very nature of Creation." However, she did not mention the Good Samaritan; her remark that the Samaritan could not have helped if he had not been rich and that the parable teaches us first to create wealth and then help the poor, has sometimes been cited in the context of this speech, but was made elsewhere. (Note: First reference in 1968 in Blackpool: "The point is that even the Good Samaritan had to have the money to help, otherwise he too would have had to pass on the other side." Then on TV in 1980: "No-one would remember the good Samaritan if he'd only had good intentions; he had money as well." In 1988, it was quoted back at her in Parliament (Prime Minister's Question Time) by Win Griffiths: "The Prime Minister thought that the most significant thing about the parable of the Good Samaritan... [Interruption] ...was that he had money in his pocket to help those in need. Will she now, in the spirit of the Good Samaritan, advocate that all those who have received money beyond their wildest dreams from the Chancellor in the Budget should give it back to help those people, or does she prefer the parable of Lazarus and the rich man?") It has been suggested that by 1988 the Samaritan interpretation had become "an albatross" which she avoided repeating.

== Reception ==
When Thatcher finished speaking, the Moderator, James Whyte, formally presented her with church reports on homelessness, poverty and social security, which was interpreted in the press as a polite rebuke. One of these, entitled Just Sharing: a Christian Approach to the Distribution of Wealth, Income and Benefits, advocated heavy taxation on the rich and a revived Beveridge Report for the poor. The house broke into laughter and applause as Whyte read the titles of the reports. This gesture led Conservative MP Nicholas Fairbairn to declare Whyte "Satanic".

Thatcher's speech was highly controversial. One clergyman present described it as "a disgraceful travesty of the gospel". The following day, the professor of practical theology at Edinburgh University, Duncan B. Forrester, objected on Radio Forth that the church had never countenanced the idea of an "individualist's paradise". South of the border, the Church of England's Board of Social Responsibility issued a highly critical open letter. On the Catholic side, Cardinal Basil Hume remarked sardonically: "I already have to deal with one leader who thinks they're infallible."

Criticism was not restricted to voices within the churches. Much resentment was caused by the message "If a man will not work, he shall not eat" from a prime minister who had presided over an unprecedented rise in unemployment. Holding this speech before the Scottish church at a time when the Conservative party had just lost seats in Scotland and Thatcher's approval ratings north of the border were particularly low has been described as "political suicide". One journalist recalls: "It's said that this speech marked the beginning of the end for Conservative rule in Scotland, with many voices raised in opposition to what they regarded as an alien creed that abused classic Christian ideas in an effort to fashion a political manifesto." Thatcher's foreign policy advisor Charles Powell later said: "It was an unmitigated disaster and she should never have done it."

However, Thatcher's supporters believed that if the church invited her to speak, it should have expected her to talk about the religious aspects of her worldview. The Margaret Thatcher Foundation rates the address as having key importance as a statement of Thatcher's views on "civil liberties, education, taxation, family, race, immigration, nationality, religion & morality, social security, and welfare". Thatcher herself noted, "We have had more requests for copies of that speech from all over the world than any other."

In 1989, the novelist Jonathan Raban made a detailed analysis of the address using the methodology of literary criticism, in particular studying how the vocabulary resonates with the language of English Methodism and of Scottish Presbyterianism, as well as its place in Thatcher's own political rhetoric. He discusses the allusions to Abraham Lincoln, the "Battle Hymn of the Republic" and Gilbert and Sullivan. He highlights the significance of the idiosyncratic "Judaic-Christian" (as opposed to Judeo-Christian) and the implied slighting of Islam. Raban rates the speech as a strong statement of Thatcher's ideas: "No attack on its eccentric theology, its flawed logic, its mercilessly scant language can rob Mrs Thatcher's speech of the remarkable consistency of its vision. It is stamped throughout with her peculiar integrity, her plainspun way with big ideas, her scornful and impatient certitude." However, he concludes that the language of the address "has the unpleasant ring of a new and pertly unctuous thieves' slang".

== Sources ==
- Church of Scotland Assembly Arrangements Committee (1988). "Minutes of the Proceedings of the General Assembly of the Church of Scotland 1988". General Assembly 1988. Part III: Roll of Members, Minutes of Proceedings, Cases with Deliverances, Standing Orders, Members of Committees. ISBN 0-86153-111-6.
- Cole, Amaris (14 April 2013). "Tributes paid to Baroness Thatcher". Church of England Newspaper. No. 6172. p. 5.
- Crawley, William (5 May 2009). "Thatcher's 'Sermon on the Mound'". BBC News.
- Crossley, James G. (2014). "'Your Arms are Just Too Short to Box with God': Margaret Thatcher's Neoliberal Bible". Harnessing Chaos: The Bible in English Political Discourse Since 1968. London: Bloomsbury T & T Clark. pp. 95–126.
- Davidson, Lorraine (16 May 2008). "Brown to deliver his own 'Sermon on the Mound'". The Times. Archived from the original on 8 January 2009.
- Filby, Eliza (2015). God & Mrs Thatcher: The Battle for Britain's Soul. London: Biteback Publishing. ISBN 978-1-84954-785-7.
- Griffiths, Win (24 March 1988). "House of Commons PQs". Margaret Thatcher Foundation.
- Herald Newsroom (23 February 1995). "Fairbairn's Scripted Farewell". The Herald.
- Keay, Douglas (31 October 1987). "Aids, Education and the Year 2000". Woman's Own. pp. 8–10.
- McMahon, Peter (31 October 1988). "Interview for Scotland on Sunday". Scotland on Sunday (Interview with Margaret Thatcher). Reproduced by the Margaret Thatcher Foundation.
- Maddox, David (9 April 2013). "Margaret Thatcher's 'Sermon on the Mound'". The Scotsman. Archived from the original on 26 May 2018.
- Scotsman Newsroom (1 May 2009). "Thatcher 30 years on". The Scotsman.
- Spencer, Nick (7 November 2017). "From Thatcher to Corbyn, why are politicians so fond of the Good Samaritan parable". Prospect.
- Raban, Jonathan (1989). God, Man & Mrs Thatcher: A Critique of Mrs Thatcher's Address to the General Assembly of the Church of Scotland. London: Chatto and Windus. ISBN 0-7011-3470-4.
- Reekie, Christopher (22 May 2018). "Thatcher's 'Sermon on the Mound' has been widely misinterpreted". The Herald.
- Renton, Catriona (19 May 2008). "PM addresses Church of Scotland". BBC News.
- Steele, Allan (18 February 1989). "Feelings of many Scots". The Herald.
- Thatcher, Margaret (11 October 1968). "Conservative Political Centre (CPC) Lecture: What's wrong with politics?". Margaret Thatcher Foundation.
- Thatcher, Margaret (6 January 1980). "TV Interview for London Weekend Television Weekend World". Margaret Thatcher Foundation.
- Thatcher, Margaret (25 May 1988). "Speech to General Assembly of the Church of Scotland". Margaret Thatcher Foundation.
- Torrance, David (17 May 2008). "Did Thatcher get raw deal over her Sermon on the Mound?". The Scotsman. Archived from the original on 19 October 2021.
- Weiss, Antonio E. (2011). "The religious mind of Margaret Thatcher". Margaret Thatcher Foundation.
- N.N. (27 July 1982). "Britons unhappy with Falklands service". United Press International.
- N.N. (6 August 1994). "Why the councillor received a vote of confidence". The Herald.
