= Acta Classica =

- Discipline: Classics
- Language: English
- Edited by: John Hilton

Publication details
- History: 1958–present
- Publisher: Classical Association of South Africa (South Africa)
- Frequency: Annual

Standard abbreviations
- ISO 4: Acta Class.

Indexing
- ISSN: 0065-1141
- LCCN: 64042291
- OCLC no.: 848284571

Links
- Journal homepage; Project Muse; Sabinet; JStor

Acta Classica: Proceedings of the Classical Association of South Africa is an annual academic journal that covers all aspects of classical studies, including studies in ancient literature and history, as well as Patristic and Byzantine themes. It is published by the Classical Association of South Africa. The editor-in-chief is Martine de Marre (University of South Africa).

According to SCImago Journal Rank (SJR), the journal h-index is 5, ranking it to Q4 in Classics.

== History ==
The publication of the first volume of Acta Classica coincided with the retirement of Professor T. J. Haarhoff from the University of the Witwatersrand in 1958. The editorial committee was made up by Prof. F. Smuts (Stellenbosch University), Prof. G. P. Goold (University of Manitoba; formerly University of Cape Town), Prof. G. van N. Viljoen (University of South Africa), Dr. C. P. T. Naude (University of Witwatersrand), Dr. P. L. Nicolaides (Johannesburg), and Mr. B. L. Hijmans (University of Cape Town). The journal superseded the short-lived Proceedings and Selected Papers of the Classical Association of South Africa, of which only two volumes were produced: First Issue: 1927-1929 and Second Issue: 1929–1931.

Previous editors of the journal: Frans Smuts (1958); Gerrit Viljoen (1959–1966); Henri Gonin (1967–1984); Ursula Vogel-Weidemann (1985–1996); William Henderson (1997–2004); Louise Cilliers (2005–2009); David Wardle (2010–2012); John Hilton (2013-2022); and Martine de Marre (2022-present).
