= Marie Victoria Williams =

South African classicist (1882–1955)

- Born: September 7, 1882; New Westminster, British Columbia, Canada
- Died: May 13, 1955 (aged 72); Johannesburg, South Africa
- Education: St Mary's School, Waverley
- Alma mater: Huguenot College (B.A. Honours); Newnham College, Cambridge (Classical Tripos)
- Occupation: Classicist
- Employer(s): Huguenot College; University of Witwatersrand

Marie Victoria Williams (7 September 1882 – 13 May 1955) was a South African classicist.

== Academic career ==
Williams was born in New Westminster in Canada in 1882, emigrating to the South African Republic with her parents at the age of 11. She matriculated at St Mary's School, Waverley in Johannesburg – gaining first place in the entire country. From St Mary's she proceeded, to Huguenot College in Wellington, where she completed her BA Honours degree in Classics in 1901. From Huguenot she went to Newnham College, Cambridge, completing the Classical Tripos in 1906. She stayed on at Cambridge for another year on a Marion Kennedy Scholarship, where she completed research towards her monograph, Six Essays on the Platonic Theory of Knowledge as Expounded in the Latter Dialogues and Reviewed by Aristotle (Cambridge University Press, 1908).

She returned to South Africa, and Huguenot College, eventually taking up the position of Chair of Greek. Resigning from Huguenot College, she relocated to Johannesburg, and in 1923 took up the position of Senior Lecturer in Greek at the University of Witwatersrand, where she remained until retirement. She died in Johannesburg in 1955, aged 72.

Apart from her monograph, she also published articles in a number of scholarly periodicals, such as The Classical Review and the Proceedings and Selected Papers of the Classical Association of South Africa.
