= William Rollo (academic) =

Southern African academic (1892–1960)

Principal of the University College of Rhodesia and Nyasaland Interim
- In office November 1953 – December 1955
- Preceded by: Office established
- Succeeded by: Walter Adams

Personal details
- Born: 1892 Glasgow, Scotland, United Kingdom
- Died: 1960 (aged 67–68) Grahamstown, Cape Province, Union of South Africa
- Education: University of Glasgow (MA); Leiden University (DLitt)

William Rollo Jr. (1892–1960) was a Scottish-born South African academic.

== History ==
Rollo was born in 1892 in Glasgow and graduated from the University of Glasgow with an MA in classics in 1915. After the war he completed his DLitt in linguistics at Leiden University. His thesis was on the Marquina dialect of the Basque language. He immigrated to South Africa in 1925, where he was professor of classics, then Head of the Classics Department and Dean of the Faculty of Arts at the University of Cape Town until 1953, when he was invited to take up the post of interim principal of the University College of Rhodesia and Nyasaland, now the University of Zimbabwe.

A skilled linguist, he taught himself Japanese during the Second World War, so he could teach the rudiments of the language to South African pilots who were going to fight in the Far East.

== Death ==
He died in 1960 in Grahamstown, while teaching classics at Rhodes University.

Educational offices
Preceded by not established	Vice–Chancellors and principals of the University of Zimbabwe; 1953 – 1955	Succeeded by Sir Walter Adams
