= List of University of Zimbabwe people =

Pride Chigwedere

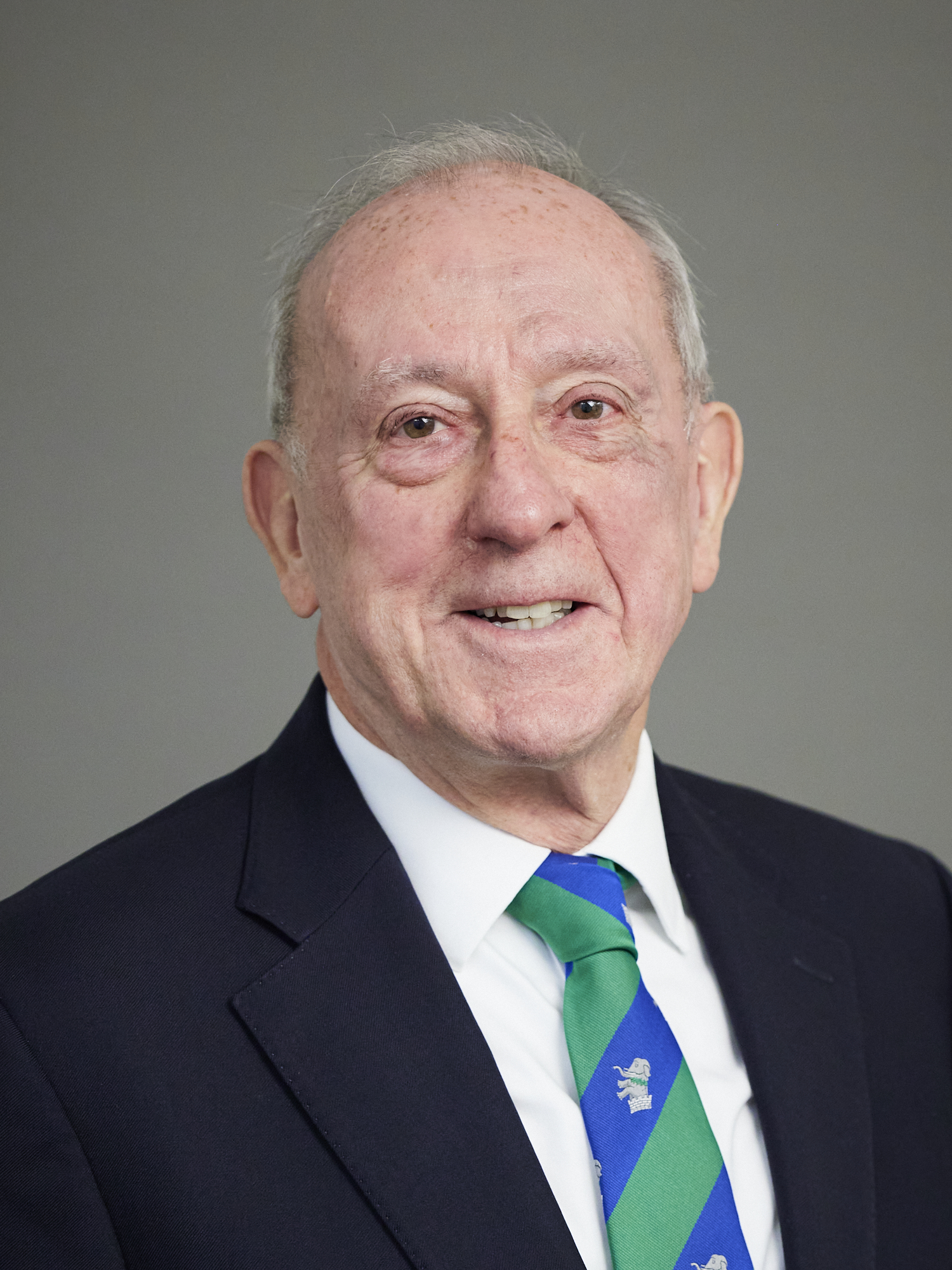
Robert Hayward, Baron Hayward

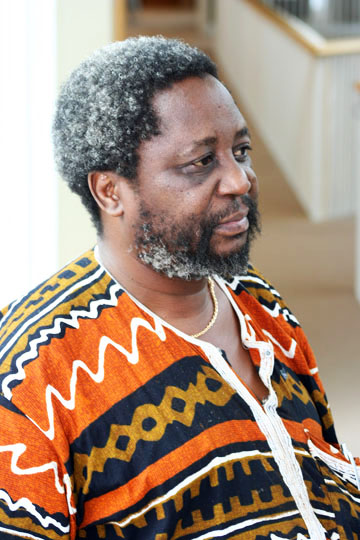
Chenjerai Hove

Fay Chung

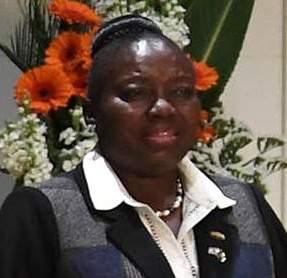
Rebecca Kadaga

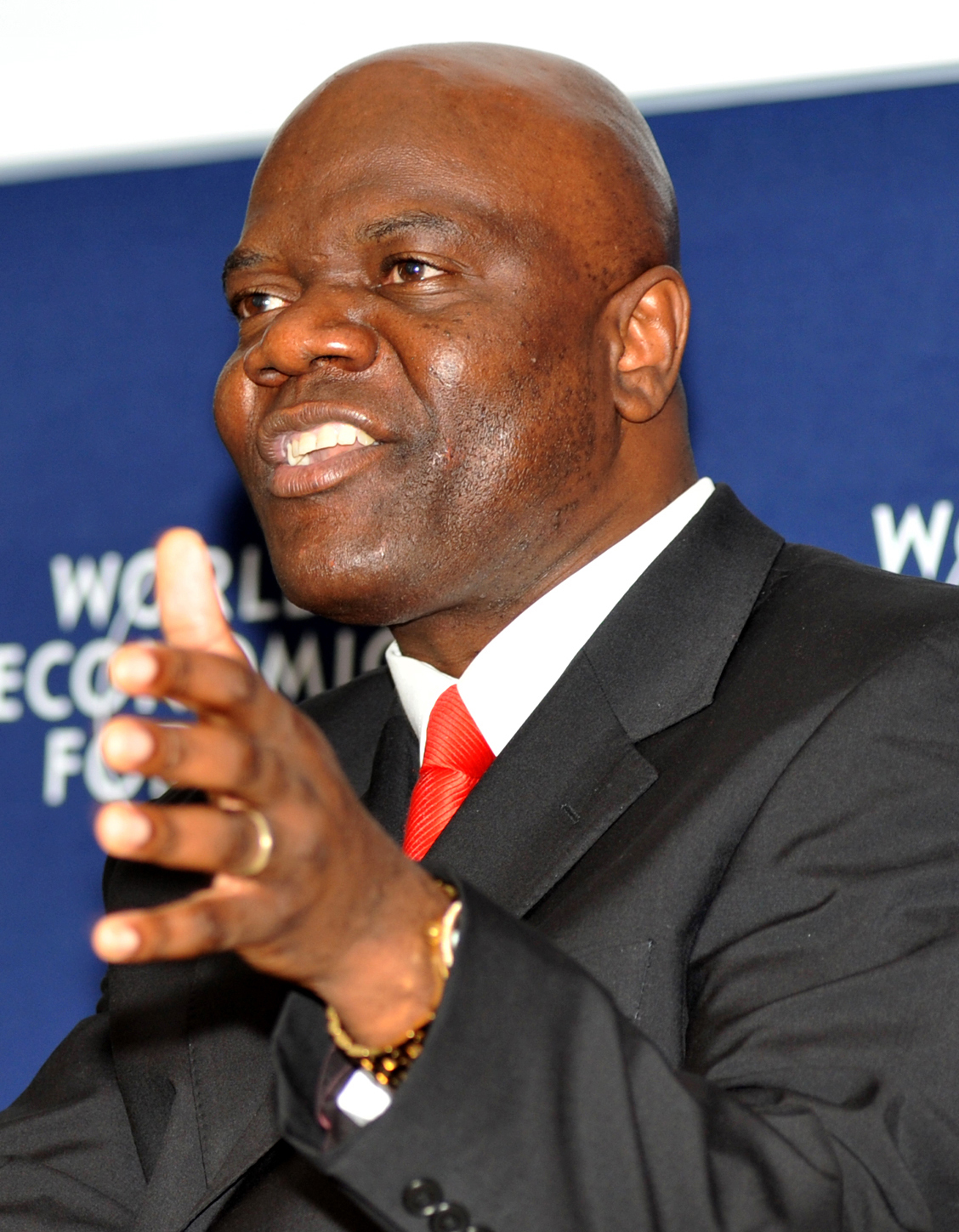
Arthur Mutambara

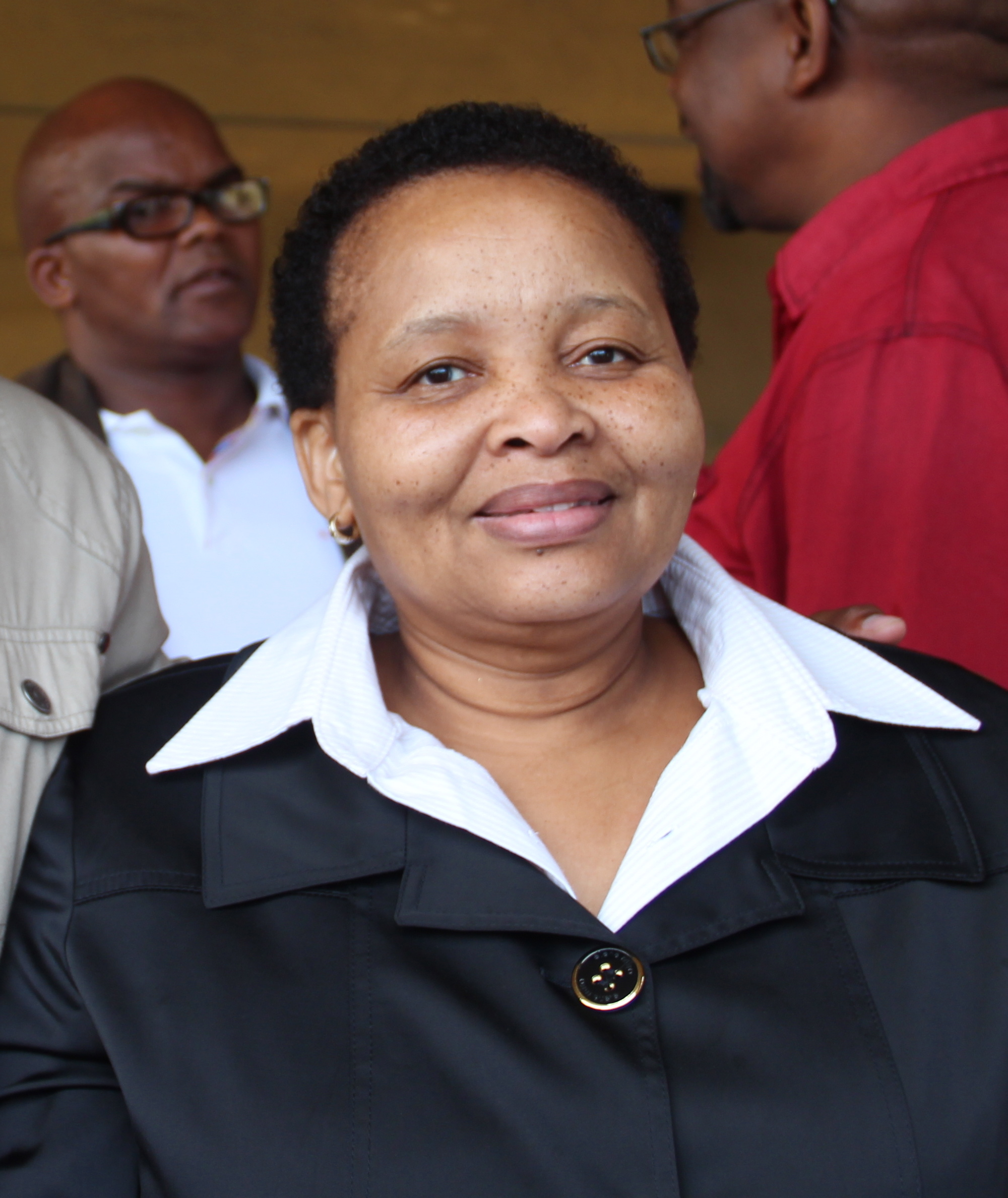
Lulama Xingwana

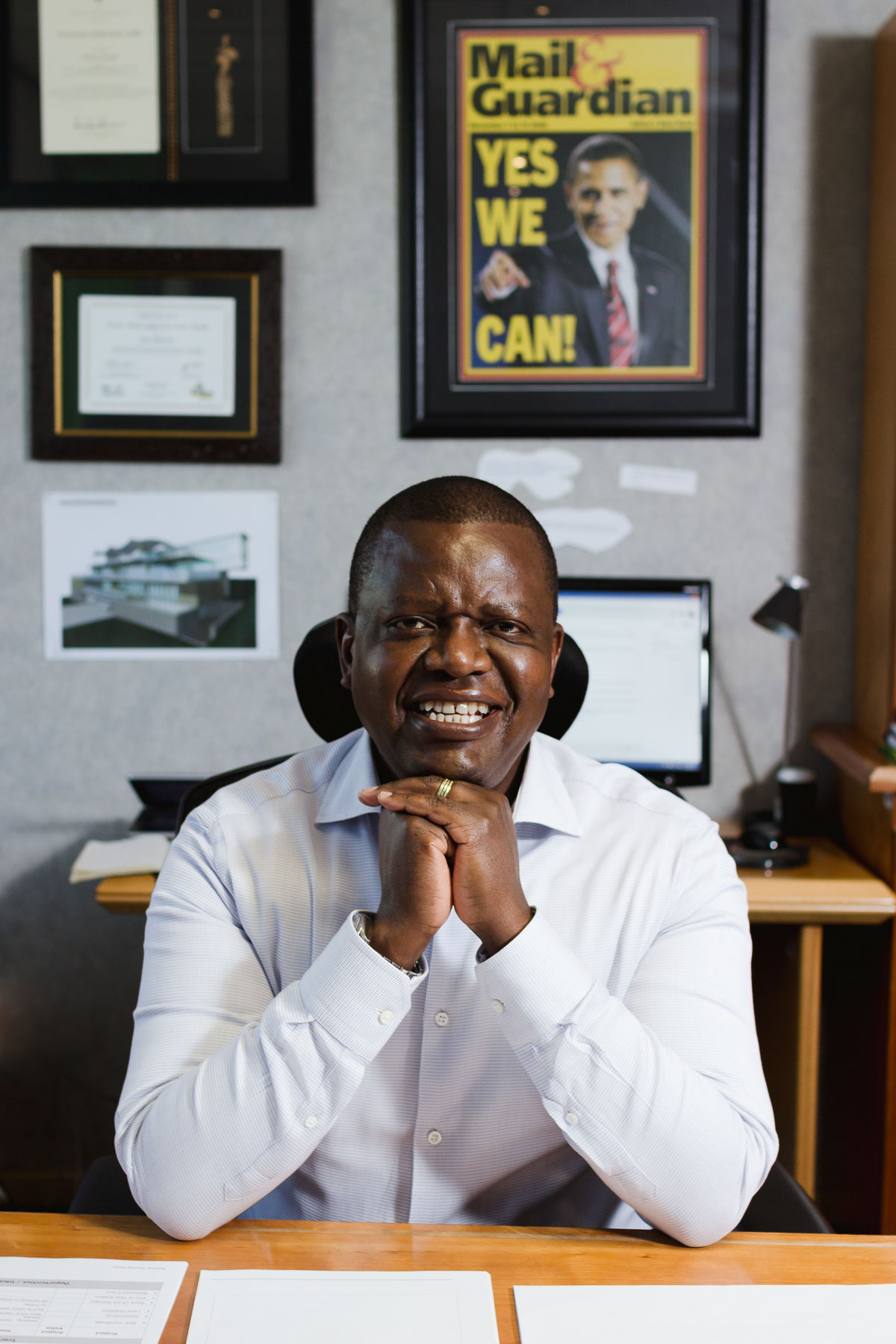
Trevor Ncube

This list of University of Zimbabwe people includes notable alumni, professors, and administrators associated with the University of Zimbabwe, formerly the University of Rhodesia.

== Alumni ==
=== Academia ===
- Kathleen Coleman (1975), classicist and professor at Harvard University
- John McDowell, South African philosopher and professor at the University of Pittsburgh
- Peter McLaughlin, Northern Irish-Zimbabwean educator, historian, and school administrator
- Levi Nyagura, mathematician; Vice Chancellor of the University of Zimbabwe since 2003

=== Business and finance ===
- Gideon Gono, banker; Governor of the Reserve Bank of Zimbabwe 2003–2013
- David Hatendi (1976), businessman and banker; Zimbabwe's first black Rhodes Scholar
- Paul Tangi Mhova Mkondo, businessman, political activist, and commercial farmer
- Blessing Mudavanhu, businessman, banker, and corporate executive

=== Entertainment ===
- Lucian Msamati (1997), British-Tanzanian actor
- Xoliswa Sithole (1987), Zimbabwean-South African actress and documentary filmmaker

=== Government, law, and politics ===
==== Political officeholders ====
- Michael Lulume Bayigga (2004), Ugandan physician and Member of Parliament
- Tendai Biti (1990), lawyer and Member of Parliament; Minister of Finance 2009–2013
- Nelson Chamisa, lawyer and Member of Parliament; Minister of Information and Communications Technology 2009–2013
- Fortune Chasi, lawyer and Member of Parliament
- Fay Chung (1968), educator and politician; Minister of Education, Sport and Culture 1988–1993
- Lord Robert Hayward; British politician and Member of Parliament 1983–1992
- Rebecca Kadaga (2000, 2003); Ugandan politician and Member of Parliament; Speaker of the Ugandan Parliament since 2011
- David Karimanzira (1973); educator and politician; Minister of Youth, Sport and Culture 1985–1987; Minister of Lands, Agriculture and Rural Settlement 1987–1990; Minister of Higher Education and Technology 1990–1993; Minister of Information, Post and Telecommunications 1993–1997; Governor of Mashonaland East Province 1997–2006; Governor of Harare Province 2006–2011
- Jessie Majome (1995, 2008), lawyer and Member of Parliament
- Witness Mangwende, politician; Minister of Foreign Affairs 1981–1987; Ministry of Information, Posts, and Telecommunications 1987–1991; Minister of Lands, Agriculture, and Rural Resettlement 1991–1994; Minister of Education and Culture 1995–2002; Minister of Transport and Communication 2002–2004; Governor of Harare Province 2004–2005
- Oppah Muchinguri, politician; Member of Parliament until 2008; Minister of Women's Affairs, Gender and Community Development 2005-2009; Minister of Higher and Tertiary Education and Science and Technology Development 2014-2015; Minister of Environment, Water and Climate since 2015
- Arthur Mutambara (1990), politician and founder of the Movement for Democratic Change – Mutambara party; Deputy Prime Minister of Zimbabwe 2009–2013
- Benon Mutambi, economist and civil servant, Permanent Secretary of the Ugandan Ministry of Internal Affairs since 2016
- Christopher Mutsvangwa (attended), businessman, diplomat, and politician; Zimbabwean Ambassador to China 2002–2006; Member of Parliament 2013–2016; Minister for War Veterans 2014–2016; Chairman of the Zimbabwe National Liberation War Veterans Association since 2014; Minister of Media, Information, and Broadcast Services since 2017
- Welshman Ncube, lawyer, businessman, professor, and politician; Minister of Industry and Commerce 2009–2013
- Sophia Simba, Tanzanian politician and Member of Parliament; Minister of Community Development, Gender and Children 2006–2008 and 2010–2015
- Lulama Xingwana, South African politician; Member of Parliament since 1994; Minister of Agriculture and Land Affairs 2006–2009; Minister of Arts and Culture 2009–2010; Minister for Women, Children and Persons with Disabilities 2010–2014
- Patrick Zhuwao; politician, businessman, and farmer; Member of Parliament 2008-2013; Minister of Youth Development, Indigenisation and Economic Empowerment 2015-2017; Minister of Public Service, Labour and Social Welfare 2017

==== Diplomats ====
- Boniface Chidyausiku, diplomat; Zimbabwean ambassador to China and North Korea (1990–1996), Angola (1996–1999), the World Trade Organization (1999–2002), the United Nations (1999–2010), and Russia (2011–2015)
- Julian Harston, British diplomat for Her Majesty's Diplomatic Service and the United Nations
- Tichaona Jokonya, politician and diplomat; Zimbabwean Ambassador to Ethiopia 1983–1988; Minister of Information 2005–2006
- Mike Nicholas Sango, Zimbabwe National Army brigadier general and diplomat; Zimbabwean Ambassador to Russia since 2015
- Trudy Stevenson; politician and diplomat; founding member of the Movement for Democratic Change; Member of Parliament 2000–2008; Zimbabwean ambassador to Senegal and The Gambia since 2009

==== Lawyers and judges ====
- George Chiweshe (1988), Zimbabwe National Army brigadier general; chairman of the Zimbabwe Electoral Commission
- Anne-Marie Gowora (1979), justice of the Supreme Court of Zimbabwe since 2012; justice of the High Court of Zimbabwe 2000–2012
- Steven W. Hawkins (1985), American lawyer; former director of the NAACP and Amnesty International
- Irene Mulyagonja, Ugandan lawyer and judge; justice of the High Court of Uganda 2008–2012; Inspector General of the Government since 2012
- Simpson Mutambanengwe (1959), Zimbabwean-Namibian lawyer and judge; justice of the High Court of Zimbabwe 1986–1994; Justice of the High Court of Namibia 1994–?; he also served on the Supreme Court of Namibia; acting Chief Justice of Namibia 2004; Chairman of the Zimbabwe Electoral Commission 2010–2013
- Tawanda Mutasah, lawyer and senior director of law and policy at Amnesty International
- Mkhululi Nyathi (1999) lawyer and former member of the Zimbabwe Electoral Commission
- Bharat Patel (1975), acting Attorney General of Zimbabwe 2003 and 2007–2008; Justice of the High Court of Zimbabwe 2005–2013; Justice of the Supreme Court of Zimbabwe since 2013
- Vusi Pikoli (1988), South African lawyer; Director of the National Prosecuting Authority 2005–2007
- Shafimana Ueitele (1990), Namibian lawyer and judge; former Electoral Commissioner of Namibia and Justice of the High Court of Namibia

==== Activists and political figures ====
- Itai Dzamara (2004), journalist and democracy activist
- Sarah Kachingwe (1961), politician and activist; first black female to enroll at the then-University College of Rhodesia in 1957
- Lovemore Madhuku (1990), lawyer and democracy activist
- Alex Magaisa (1997), lawyer and former advisor to Prime Minister Morgan Tsvangirai; lecturer at the University of Kent
- Fadzayi Mahere (2008), lawyer and political activist
- Betty Makoni, educator and female sexual abuse victims' activist
- Janice McLaughlin (1992), nun, missionary, human rights activist
- Diana Mitchell, writer and political activist
- Daniel Molokele (1999), lawyer and democracy activist
- Earnest Mudzengi (2001), human rights and democracy activist
- Everjoice Win (1988), feminist activist
- Beauty Zhuwao, politician; former Mashonaland West provincial treasurer for ZANU–PF

=== Journalism and media ===
- Caroline Gombakomba, radio journalist
- Michael Holman (1968), journalist and novelist; Africa editor for the Financial Times
- Trevor Ncube, businessman and newspaper publisher

=== Literature ===
- Catherine Buckle (1979), farmer and writer
- Shimmer Chinodya, novelist
- Chirikure Chirikure, poet, writer, and musician
- Tsitsi Dangarembga, novelist and filmmaker
- Petina Gappah, lawyer, writer, and novelist
- Chenjerai Hove, poet, novelist, and essayist
- Alexander Kanengoni, writer
- Dambudzo Marechera, novelist, playwright, poet, and short story writer
- Albert Nyathi, poet
- Len Rix, translator of Hungarian literature
- Irene Sabatini, novelist
- Elinor Sisulu, Zimbabwean-South African writer and activist

=== Medicine, science, and technology ===
- Sir Michael Berridge, British physiologist and biochemist
- Pride Chigwedere, physician and HIV/AIDS researcher
- Rachel Chikwamba, biopharmaceutical researcher
- Solomon Guramatunhu, ophthalmologist
- Steven Hatfill (1984), American physician, virologist, and biological weapons researcher
- Jonathan Hutton (1984), British-Zimbabwean ecologist and conservationist; professor at the University of Kent
- Tonderai Kasu, Substantive Director of Health and Environmental Services for Chitungwiza
- Godfrey Muguti (1978), general and plastic surgeon
- Bothwell Mbuwayesango, pediatric surgeon who successfully separated conjoined twins in 2014
- Francisca Mutapi, parasite immunologist and the first black female professor at the University of Edinburgh
- Solwayo Ngwenya, obstetrician and gynaecologist
- Madeline Nyamwanza-Makonese (1970), physician and first female doctor in Zimbabwe
- Fadzai Zengeya, academic and Geographic information system specialist

=== Music ===
- Viomak, musician and political activist

=== Religion ===
- Albert Chama, Zambian Anglican bishop; Archbishop of Central Africa since 2011
- Naboth Manzongo, Zimbabwean Anglican bishop in Canada
- Rob Nairn, South African lawyer and Tibetan Buddhist teacher and author

=== Visual arts ===
- Rashid Lombard, South African photographer and photojournalist

=== Other ===
- Maud Chifamba, youngest university student in Africa at age 14, award-winning activist and speaker

== Faculty ==
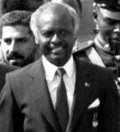
Canaan Banana, President of Zimbabwe

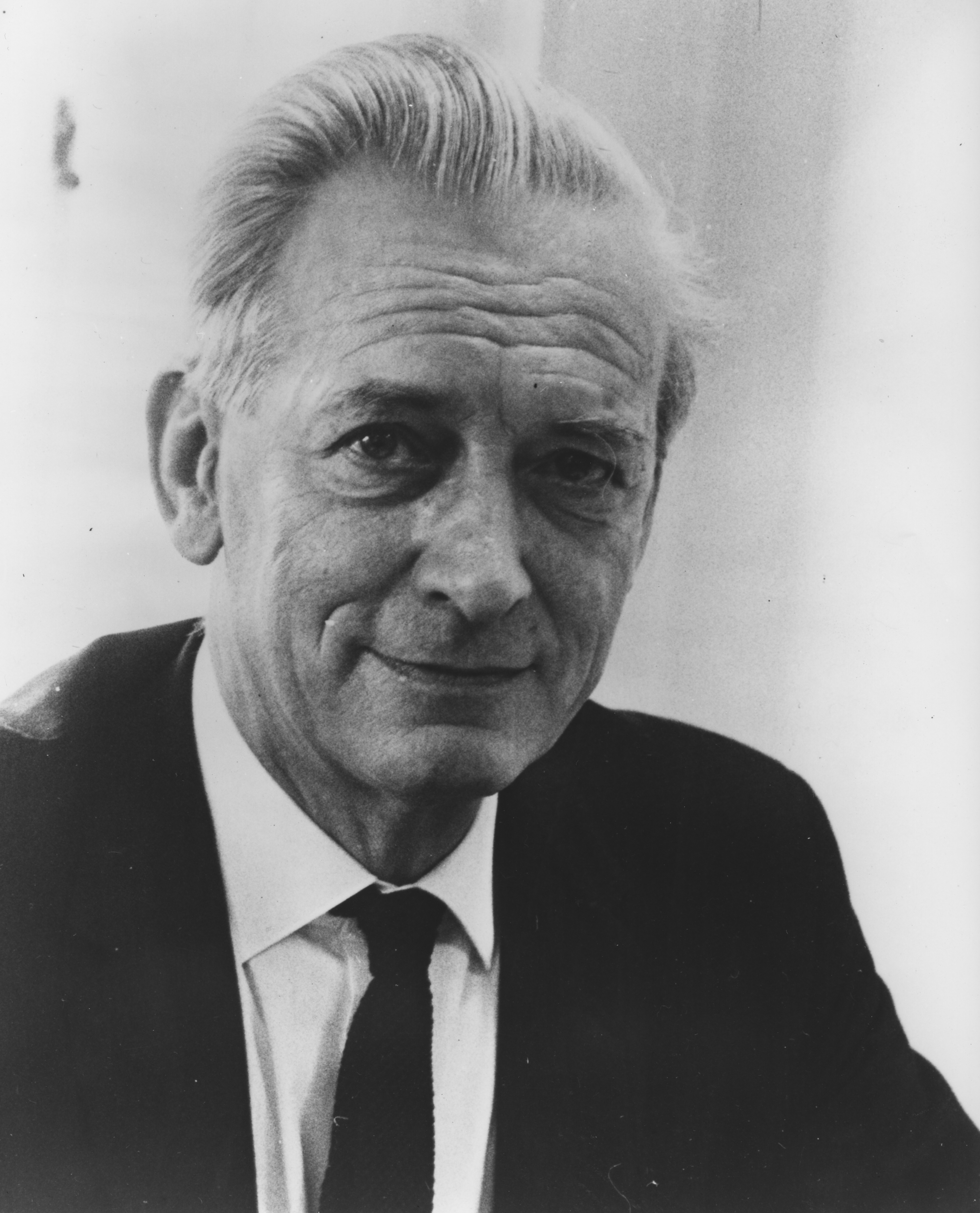
Walter Adams

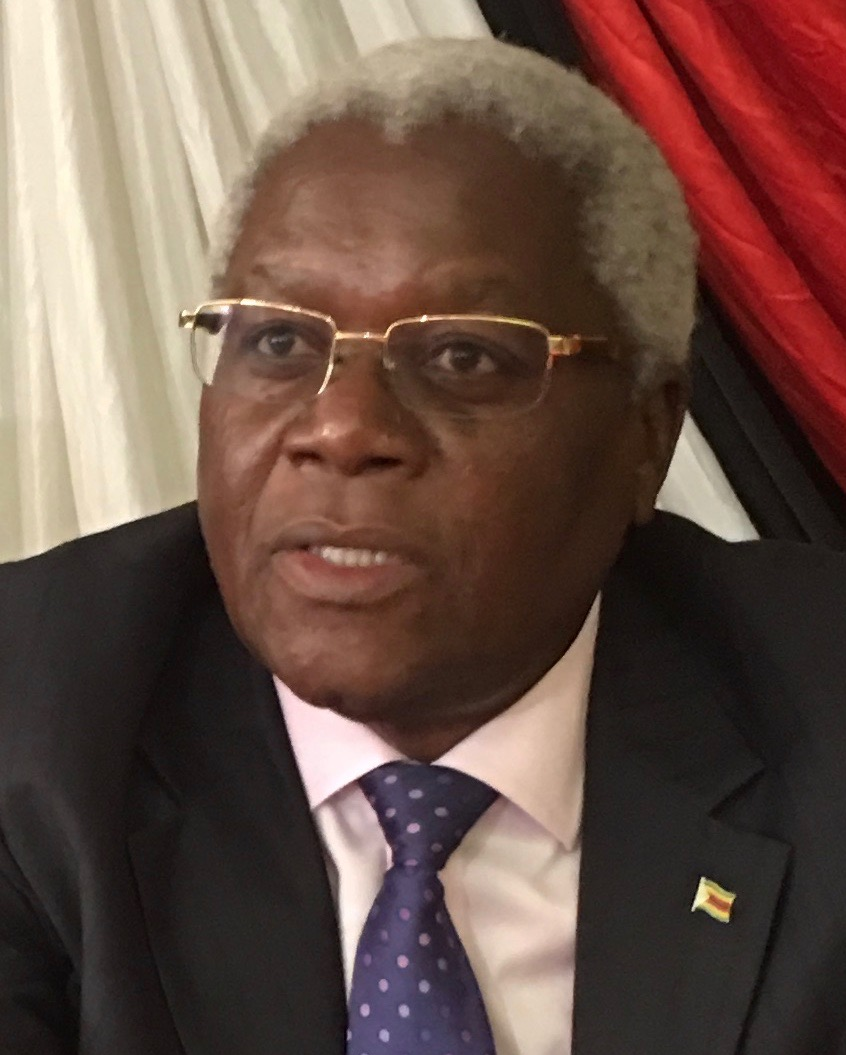
Ignatius Chombo

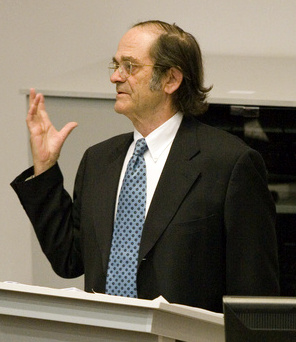
Giovanni Arrighi

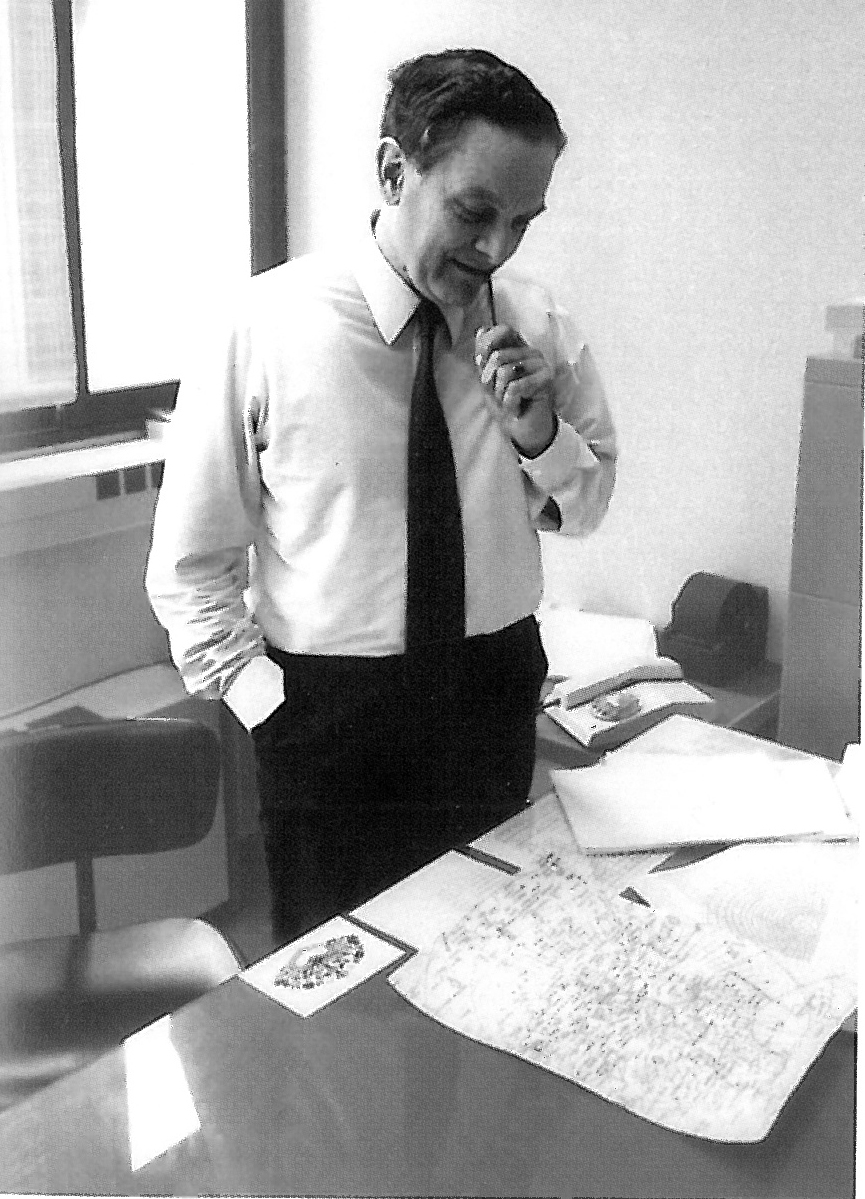
Louis Miles Muggleton

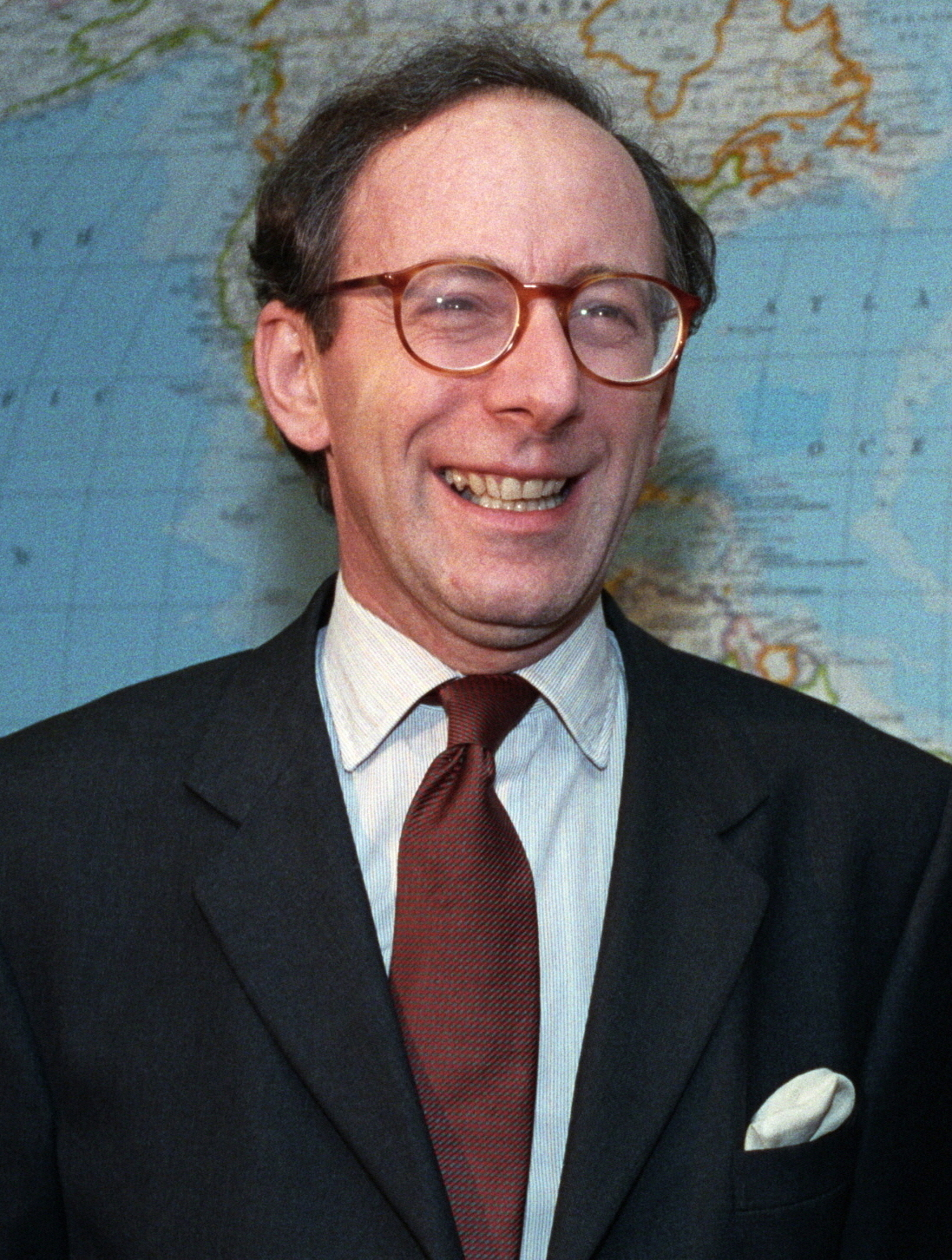
Malcolm Rifkind

=== Academia ===
==== Principals of the University of Zimbabwe ====
- William Rollo, interim Principal 1953–1955
- Walter Adams, Principal 1955–1967
- Terence Miller, Principal 1967–1969
- Robert Craig Principal 1969–1980
- Leonard Lewis, Principal 1980–1981
- Walter Kamba, Vice-Chancellor 1981–1992
- Gordon Chavunduka, Vice-Chancellor 1992–1996
- Graham Hill, Vice-Chancellor 1997–2002
- Levi Nyagura, Vice-Chancellor 2003–

==== University heads ====
A number of former University of Zimbabwe faculty and administrators have gone on to head other universities:

- Sir Walter Adams, Director of the London School of Economics
- Ngwabi Bhebhe, Vice-Chancellor of Midlands State University
- Cowdeng Chikomba, Vice-Chancellor of Bindura University of Science Education
- Peter Dzvimbo, Vice-Chancellor of Zimbabwe Open University and Rector of the African Virtual University
- Phineas Makhurane, Vice-Chancellor of the National University of Science and Technology
- Lindela Ndlovu, Vice-Chancellor of the National University of Science and Technology
- Emmanuel Ngara, Pro-Vice-Chancellor of the University of Fort Hare and Pro-Vice-Chancellor of the University of KwaZulu-Natal
- Charles Nherera, Vice-Chancellor of Chinhoyi University of Technology
- David Simbi, Vice-Chancellor of Chinhoyi University of Technology
- Julius Weinberg, Vice-Chancellor of Kingston University
- Tawana Kupe, Vice-Chancellor of University of Pretoria

==== Educators and school administrators ====
- Ezra Chitando, Zimbabwean academic; lecturer in Christian History
- Peter McLaughlin, Northern Irish historian and school administrator; lecturer in modern history at UZ 1977–1983

=== Government, law, and politics ===
==== Political officeholders ====
- Canaan Banana, Methodist minister and politician, President of Zimbabwe 1980–1987; chair of the religion department at UZ in the 1980s
- Ignatius Chombo, politician and businessman; Minister of Local Government 2000–2015; Minister of Home Affairs 2015–2017; Minister of Finance 2017; lecturer and department chair at UZ 1988–1992
- Heneri Dzinotyiweyi, mathematician and Member of Parliament; Minister of Science and Technology Development since 2009; former dean of science at UZ
- Munyaradzi Gwisai, Socialist and political activist; former Member of Parliament
- Owen Horwood, South African economist and politician; South African Minister of Finance 1975–1984; taught economics at UZ in the late 1950s
- Jonathan Moyo, politician; Minister of Information 2000–2005, 2013–2015; Member of Parliament 2005–2013; Minister of Higher and Tertiary Education, Science and Technology Development 2015–2017; was a lecturer at UZ in the Department of Political and Administrative Studies 1988–1993
- Elphas Mukonoweshuro, political scientist and politician; Minister of Public Service 2009–2011; taught political science at UZ
- Welshman Ncube, lawyer, businessman, and politician; Minister of Industry and Commerce 2009–2013; taught law at UZ 1985–2000; chair of the Department of Private Law at UZ 1988–1996
- Malcolm Rifkind, British lawyer and politician; Member of Parliament 1974–2015; British Foreign Secretary 1995–1997; was an assistant lecturer at UZ 1967–1968.

==== Lawyers and judges ====
- Anne Hellum, Norwegian jurist and professor at the University of Oslo Faculty of Law; visiting professor of law at UZ since 1989
- Ben Hlatwayo, Justice of the High Court of Zimbabwe
- Lovemore Madhuku, lawyer and democracy activist; previously taught law at UZ
- Rita Makarau, Justice and President of the High Court of Zimbabwe
- Mkhululi Nyathi, lawyer and former member of the Zimbabwe Electoral Commission; taught public law at UZ 2002–2004

==== Activists and political figures ====
- Panashe Eric Chivenge, political activist; Chairman of the National Constitutional Assembly

=== Humanities ===
- Giovanni Arrighi, Italian economist and sociologist; professor at Johns Hopkins University
- David Beach, British-Zimbabwean historian
- Korkut Boratav, Turkish Marxian economist; taught at UZ 1984–1986
- Ernest Bulle, academic and politician; taught African languages at UZ in the 1970s
- Jackson Mutero Chirenje, historian and former professor at Harvard University; former lecturer and chair of the history department at UZ
- Peter Garlake, archaeologist and historian; professor at UZ 1964–1970; forced to leave Rhodesia in 1970 due to his research concluding that Great Zimbabwe was built by the Shona people
- Shadrack Gutto, Chair of African Renaissance Studies at the University of South Africa; taught at UZ until he was deported from Zimbabwe in 1988.
- Ioan Lewis, Scottish anthropologist and historian; taught at UZ in the 1960s
- John McCracken, Scottish historian; taught at UZ 1964–1965, when he left following Rhodesia's UDI
- Diana Mitchell, political activist and writer; taught science at UZ
- Brian Raftopoulos, historian and former professor of Development Studies at UZ
- Terence Ranger, British historian; taught history at UZ 1957–1963 when he was deported from Rhodesia for his views on African history that the government considered radical
- Barrie Pettman, businessman, academic, and philanthropist; was director of the manpower unit at UZ 1978–1979

=== Literature ===
- Charles Mungoshi, novelist and short story writer; writer-in-residence at UZ 1982–1985
- Solomon Mutswairo, novelist and poet; wrote the lyrics to the National Anthem of Zimbabwe; former writer-in-residence at UZ
- Len Rix, translator of Hungarian literature; taught English at UZ
- Clive Wake, South African editor and translator of modern French and African literature
- Musaemura Zimunya; writer and poet; professor of English at UZ since 1980

=== Medicine, science, and technology ===
- Gordon Chavunduka, sociologist and traditional African medicine advocate; former President of the Zimbabwe National Traditional Healers Association; Vice-Chancellor of UZ 1992–1996
- Christopher Chetsanga, biochemist; taught at UZ 1983–2017; dean of science 1986–1991; Pro-Vice-Chancellor 1991–1993
- Innocent Gangaidzo, academic and gastroenterologist, who currently serves as the president of the East, Central, and Southern Africa College of Physicians (ESCACOP).
- Michael Gelfand, South African-Zimbabwean physician; professor of African Medicine at UZ 1962–1970; professor and head of the department of medicine 1970–1977
- James Gita Hakim, professor of medicine, cardiologist and HIV clinical trialist
- Graham Hill, veterinary surgeon and researcher; Vice-Chancellor of UZ 1997–2002
- Laurence Levy, first neurosurgeon in Africa; professor of surgery and anatomy at UZ
- Terence Miller, British geologist; Principal of UZ 1967–1969
- Louis Miles Muggleton, South African-British physicist and electrical engineer; founder, professor, and dean of the Faculty of Engineering at UZ 1973–1980
- Brian Walker, Zimbabwean-Australian ecologist; was a lecturer at UZ 1969–1975

=== Religion ===
- Robert Craig; Scottish Presbyterian minister and theologian; former Moderator of the General Assembly of the Church of Scotland; Principal of UZ 1969–1980
- Adrian Hastings, Malaysian-British Roman Catholic priest, historian, and writer; professor of religious studies at UZ 1982–1985
- Rob Nairn, South African lawyer and Tibetan Buddhist teacher and author; taught law and criminology at UZ
