= Godfrey Muguti =

Zimbabwean surgeon and academic

Godfrey Ignatius Muguti
- Born: August 30, 1952 (age 74); Masvingo, Zimbabwe
- Education: University of Zimbabwe; University of Sydney; Royal College of Surgeons of Edinburgh
- Known for: Leadership in surgical education; presidency of the College of Surgeons of East, Central and Southern Africa
- Awards: Honorary FRCS (Eng); Rowan Nicks Medal; Donald R. Laub Humanitarian Award; ZiMA Lifetime Achievement Award
- Scientific career
- Fields: General surgery plastic surgery hepato-pancreato-biliary surgery
- Workplaces: University of Zimbabwe; Stanford University School of Medicine; Mpilo Central Hospital

Godfrey Ignatius Muguti (born 30 August 1952) is a Zimbabwean surgeon, academic, and medical administrator. He is a professor of surgery at the University of Zimbabwe and a former president of the College of Surgeons of East, Central and Southern Africa (COSECSA). Muguti has served as editor-in-chief of the Central African Journal of Medicine and holds a visiting adjunct professorship at the Stanford University School of Medicine.

== Early life and education ==
Muguti was born in Masvingo, Zimbabwe. He earned his MBChB from the University of Zimbabwe in 1978. He later pursued postgraduate surgical training in the United Kingdom and Australia, completing an MS degree at the University of Sydney and fellowships with COSECSA and the Royal College of Surgeons of Edinburgh.

== Career ==
=== Academic and clinical work ===
Muguti joined the University of Zimbabwe as a lecturer in surgery and became professor and head of the department of surgical sciences. He has taught and supervised surgeons across Southern Africa, contributing to several improvements in postgraduate training.

He is an adjunct/visiting professor at the Stanford University School of Medicine, participating in collaborative global surgery projects and training programs.

Muguti also served as medical director of The Avenues Clinic in Harare.

=== Leadership in COSECSA ===
As president of COSECSA, Muguti helped to expand regional surgical training and accreditation. He played a significant role in strengthening reconstructive surgery education across member countries.

=== Editorial work ===
Muguti was editor-in-chief of the Central African Journal of Medicine, one of the oldest continuously published medical journals in the region.

== Contributions to surgery ==
Muguti contributed to the establishment of Zimbabwe's training pathway in plastic and reconstructive surgery. He was also involved in the creation of surgical simulation and minimally invasive training at the University of Zimbabwe International Centre for Surgical Simulation (UZICSS).

His clinical interests include general surgery, reconstructive surgery and HPB surgery. His research has covered oncologic surgery, surgical education and trauma care.

== Awards and recognition ==
- Honorary Fellowship of the Royal College of Surgeons of England (1997).
- Rowan Nicks Medal, Royal Australasian College of Surgeons (2016).
- Donald R. Laub Humanitarian Award, ReSurge International (2023).
- Lifetime Achievement Award, Zimbabwe Medical Association (2023).

== Personal life ==
Muguti was born in Masvingo.

== Selected publications ==
- Bisola Onajin-Obembe (October 2021). "Enhanced postoperative surveillance versus standard of care to reduce mortality among adult surgical patients in Africa (ASOS-2): a cluster-randomised controlled trial". The Lancet Global Health. 9 (10): e1391–e1401. doi:10.1016/s2214-109x(21)00291-6. ISSN 2214-109X. PMC 8440223. PMID 34418380. Wikidata Q108910604.
- Muguti GI (1 April 1993). "Experience with breast cancer in Zimbabwe". Journal of the Royal College of Surgeons of Edinburgh. 38 (2): 75–78. ISSN 1479-666X. PMID 8478837. Wikidata Q46159648.
- Mulwafu, Wakisa; Fualal, Jane; Bekele, Abebe; Itungu, Stella; Borgstein, Eric; Erzingatsian, Krikor; Nungu, Samwel; Chikoya, Laston; White, Russell; Muguti, Godfrey (1 February 2022). "The impact of COSECSA in developing the surgical workforce in East Central and Southern Africa". The Surgeon. 20 (1): 2–8. doi:10.1016/j.surge.2021.11.003. ISSN 1479-666X.

== See also ==
- Innocent Gangaidzo
