= Chifamba =

Chifamba may refer to:

- Maud Chifamba (born 1997), Zimbabwean university student
- Chisamba, a town in Zambia
