= Chigwedere =

Chigwedere is a surname. Notable people with the surname include:

- Aeneas Chigwedere, Zimbabwean politician
- Pride Chigwedere, Zimbabwean physician-scientist
