= Bindura University of Science Education =

University in Bindura, Zimbabwe

- Motto: Commitment Discipline Excellence
- Type: Public
- Established: 1996
- Chancellor: Emmerson Dambudzo Mnangagwa
- Vice-Chancellor: Prof. Eddie Mwenje
- Location: Bindura, Zimbabwe; 17.3251°S 31.3326°E
- Campus: Urban

Bindura University of Science Education is a Zimbabwean university offering courses within the fields of Science, Technology, Engineering and Mathematics, Science Education, Commerce and Social Sciences.

The main campus is located 5 km from Bindura town center, with a separate campus which houses the Faculty of Science on the Trojan Road. The Faculty of Social Science along the main library is located in the city centre.

== History ==
The origins of the Bindura University of Science Education (BUSE) formerly Bindura University College of Science Education (BUCSE) can be traced to the Zimbabwe-Cuba Teacher Training Programme, which started in the mid-1980s. The programme used to send Zimbabwean student teachers to Cuba for training in Science Education. Known as the best University in terms of education in Zimbabwe.

The programme was relocated to Zimbabwe in 1995 for economic reasons. A decision was made to set up a college in Bindura under the auspices of the University of Zimbabwe, but which would be turned into a full-fledged university within a period of two to four years. The college admitted its first group of 125 students in March 1996.

An act of parliament, the Bindura University of Science Education Act, was passed in February 2000 conferring university status to the College becoming the third state university established in Zimbabwe. The first graduation ceremony was held in 2003 where the Chancellor and Vice-Chancellor of the university were installed as well as capping a group of 140 graduands.

Zimbabwe opened its first-ever School of Optometry at the Bindura University of Science Education in 2018.

In 2019, a BUSE alumnus, Tatenda Magetsi received a prestigious Rhodes scholarship to study at the Oxford University in the United Kingdom.

== Location ==
The university is located in Bindura, which is about 89 km north east of Harare. Bindura is the provincial capital of Mashonaland Central Province and is a small town of about 40,000 inhabitants. It offers a quiet semi-urban environment.

== Politics ==
The university has experienced problems in Zimbabwe mainly because of its location in Mashonaland Central which is considered a stronghold of the ruling party ZANU PF. In 2002 a student belonging to the MDC party was brutally assaulted by suspected ZANU-PF supporters and the university was briefly closed.

== Vice Chancellors ==
- Professor Cowdeng Chikomba 1996-2002 (Pro-Vice Chancellor) late
- Professor Sam Abel Tswana 2002 - 2008 (late)
- Professor Eddie Mwenje 2013–present

== Notable faculty ==
- Christopher Chetsanga - Harvard - discovered two enzymes involved in DNA repair

== Sports ==
Bindura University houses the National Sports Academy, which facilitates the development of identified talent with the aim of achieving international success. It is also set to promote research in high-performance sport development and any such research that can improve decision making in sport as well as the establishment of partnerships with international organizations and donor agencies to support joint programmes.

USA-based National Sports Academy athlete and Bindura University of Science Education alumnus Tapiwa Makarawu carved his name into the history books by qualifying for the Olympics in 2024.<https://www.herald.co.zw/athletics-coach-nyasango-proud-of-makarawu/>
