= DNA-formamidopyrimidine glycosylase =

Identifiers
- EC no.: 3.2.2.23
- CAS no.: 78783-53-6

Databases
- IntEnz: IntEnz view
- BRENDA: BRENDA entry
- ExPASy: NiceZyme view
- KEGG: KEGG entry
- MetaCyc: metabolic pathway
- PRIAM: profile
- PDB structures: RCSB PDB PDBe PDBsum
Search
- PMC: articles
- PubMed: articles
- NCBI: proteins

DNA-formamidopyrimidine glycosylase (EC 3.2.2.23, Fapy-DNA glycosylase, deoxyribonucleate glycosidase, 2,6-diamino-4-hydroxy-5N-formamidopyrimidine-DNA glycosylase, 2,6-diamino-4-hydroxy-5(N-methyl)formamidopyrimidine-DNA glycosylase, formamidopyrimidine-DNA glycosylase, DNA-formamidopyrimidine glycosidase, Fpg protein) is an enzyme with systematic name DNA glycohydrolase (2,6-diamino-4-hydroxy-5-(N-methyl)formamidopyrimide releasing). FPG is a base excision repair enzyme which recognizes and removes a wide range of oxidized purines from correspondingly damaged DNA. It was discovered by Zimbabwean scientist Christopher J. Chetsanga in 1975.

This enzyme catalyses the following chemical reaction

Hydrolysis of DNA containing ring-opened 7-methylguanine residues, releasing 2,6-diamino-4-hydroxy-5-(N-methyl)formamidopyrimidine

This enzyme participates in processes leading to recovery from mutagenesis and/or cell death by alkylating agents.
