= Florence Mudzingwa =

Zimbabwean disability rights activist

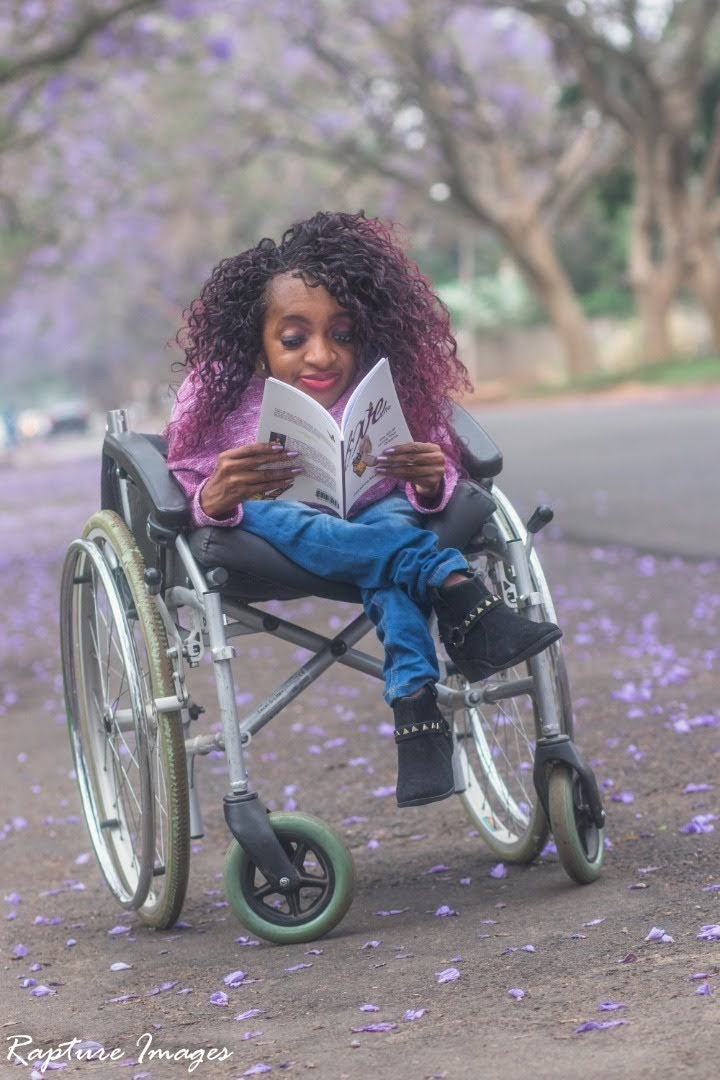
- Born: Zimbabwe
- Education: Zimbabwe Open University
- Occupation: disability rights activist
- Organization: Vital Voices Global Partnership
- Known for: Founding the social enterprise Hope Resurrect Trust

Florence Mudzingwa is a Zimbabwean disability rights activist, social enterprise founder and writer. She founded the social enterprise Hope Resurrect Trust in 2013.

== Biography ==
Mudzingwa was born weighing 1.4 kg, was diagnosed with osteogenesis imperfecta (which makes bones fragile and prone to injury), and her parents were told by their doctor that she would only live up to five months old.

She was educated at George VI Memorial in Bulawayo, before studying towards a BSc in counselling with the Zimbabwe Open University (ZOU). She had learnt about the ZOU after they exhibited at a Disability Expo.

Mudzingwa is also a certified Emotional Intelligence and Personal Development Coach with the International Coaching and Mentoring Foundation (ICMF), known as "Coach Flow."

In 2013, Mudzingwa founded the social enterprise Hope Resurrect Trust, which promotes disability awareness and inclusion, does advocacy work relating to the welfare of persons with disabilities and empowers girls and women with disabilities to be independent and contribute economically. Supporting partners include the embassies of Australia, Canada and Malawi, and local organisations Alive Albinism and the Deaf Zimbabwe Trust.

During the COVID-19 pandemic, Mudzingwa used WhatsApp to encourage girls living with disabilities to sell items such as facemasks so that they could support themselves and their families. She has explained that: "they can relate to me. They say "if she is working, we can also work." This is not a time for self-pity, being a woman and living with disability should not turn us into charity cases."

She has published the semi-autobiographical book Life: The Art of Living Your Dreams in 2021, which was celebrated at a launch event at Three Anchor House that was attended by the Australian ambassador to Zimbabwe Bronte Moules.

In 2019, Mudzingwa was awarded the Women Living with Disability Making an Impact in Society award during a conference celebrating women with disabilities, and in 2024, she became a fellow of the Vital Voices Global Partnership.
