= Mkhululi Nyathi =

Zimbabwean lawyer

- Born: Gwanda
- Occupation: Lawyer
- Known for: Dissent as electoral commissioner in 2013 general elections

Mkhululi Nyathi is a Zimbabwean lawyer who was appointed to the Zimbabwe Electoral Commission in 2010 and resigned on the day of the 2013 general elections, citing electoral irregularities.

== Career history ==
Nyathi received a Bachelor of Laws at the University of Zimbabwe in 1999 and a Master of Laws from the University of the Witwatersrand in 2005. From 2002 to 2004, he was a lecturing Fellow in the Department of Public Law at the University of Zimbabwe. At the end of 2005, he joined the Faculty of Commerce, National University of Science and Technology, where he taught insurance law and commercial law. At the end of 2006, he entered private practice and As of 2013 was Senior and Managing Partner at Mabhikwa Hikwa and Nyathi Legal Practitioners in Bulawayo.

In 2009, Nyathi represented Mncedisi Twala, the man who accused John Nkomo, then Speaker of Parliament of Zimbabwe and a candidate for vice-president of Zimbabwe African National Union – Patriotic Front (ZANU-PF), of sodomy. In 2010, in what was seen as a concession to political pressure from South African President Jacob Zuma, appointed members to the human rights and electoral commissions, including Nyathi. This action was in fulfilment to the Global Political Agreement (GPA), signed between Zimababawe's political parties on 15 September 2008, as part of the 2008–09 Zimbabwean political negotiations that ended the violence following the 2008 election.

Nyathi resigned from the electoral commissions on the day of the 2013 presidential election in a letter to President Robert Mugabe, which was copied to Prime Minister Morgan Tsvangirai and MDC leader Welshman Ncube. The letter states, "I do not wish to enumerate the many reasons of my resignation, but they all have to do with the manner the Zimbabwe 2013 harmonised elections were proclaimed and conducted. While throughout the whole process I retained some measure of hope that the integrity of the whole process could be salvaged along the way, this was not be, hence my considered decision to resign. Please note that my resignation has nothing to do with the outcome of the process, which I am still unaware of."
