= Jessie Majome =

Zimbabwean politician (born 1971)

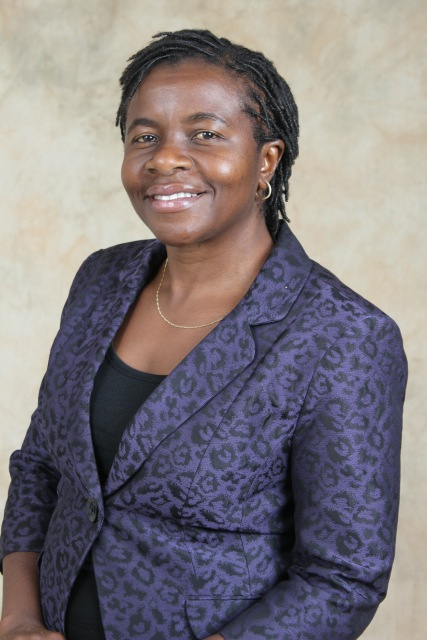

Member of the National Assembly of Zimbabwe for Harare West
- In office 2008 – August 2018

Personal details
- Born: 20 December 1971 (age 54) Salisbury, Rhodesia (today Harare, Zimbabwe)
- Party: Movement for Democratic Change – Tsvangirai
- Education: University of Zimbabwe (LL.B; MSWL); University of South Africa (LL.M)

Fungayi Jessie Majome (born 20 December 1971) was a Member of the National Assembly of the Parliament of Zimbabwe for Harare West constituency on an MDC-T ticket elected 1st in 2008 and then in 2013. She was the Chairperson of Parliament of Zimbabwe's Portfolio Committee on Justice, Legal and Parliamentary Affairs. She was a member of the Parliamentary Legal Committee and the Portfolio Committee on Local Government Rural and Urban Development. During Zimbabwe's constitution making process of 2009 to 2013 she was a member of the 25 member Parliamentary Select Committee (COPAC) on the new Constitution established by the political settlement Global Political Agreement. She served as its Spokesperson and Co-Vice Chairperson.

Former Member of National Executive Committee of the Movement for Democratic Change Party (MDC-T) and its former Secretary for Constitutional and Parliamentary Affairs.

She is the founder and principal at Jessie Majome & Co. Legal Practitioners. She is a former Zimbabwe Deputy Minister of Justice, Legal and Parliamentary Affairs and then Deputy Minister for Women's Affairs, Gender and Community Development (Zimbabwe)|Women's Affairs, Gender and Community Development. She was elected Councillor Ward 1 and Chairperson of Hwange Local Board in 2003 but was dismissed in 2004 by the ruling party Minister of Local Government for not obeying his directive to rescind her suspension of the board's Chief Executive Officer .

Her urgent High Court challenge of her removal is still pending.

She holds a Master of Laws (L.L.M.) University of South Africa 2004, a Masters in Women's Law (M.S.W.L.) University of Zimbabwe 2008, a Post Graduate Diploma in Women's Law Dip. W.L. 1996, Bachelor of Laws Honours (L.L.B.S.) University of Zimbabwe 1995. On 11 May 2018, she announced that she would not be participating in the party's primary elections citing manipulation of party guidelines. Her competitor would have been 25 year-old Joanna Mamombe who many felt had an unfair advantage over Majome. She is Catholic. She sits on a variety of boards, such as the Mutemwa Leprosy Catholic Care Centre (MLCC), Zimbabwe Women Lawyers' Association where she chairs the Professional Interests Committee(ZWLA), Ndabaningi Sithole Foundation.

== See also ==
- List of University of Zimbabwe people
