= Solwayo Ngwenya =

Zimbabwean obstetrician, gynaecologist and medical academic

Professor Solwayo Ngwenya FRCOG
- Born: Lupane District, Matabeleland North, Zimbabwe
- Education: University of Zimbabwe
- Known for: Maternal health research and hospital administration
- Scientific career
- Fields: Obstetrics and gynaecology, maternal health
- Workplaces: Mpilo Central Hospital, National University of Science and Technology, Zimbabwe

Solwayo Ngwenya is a Zimbabwean obstetrician and gynaecologist, medical academic and hospital administrator. He is a professor of obstetrics and gynaecology at the National University of Science and Technology, Zimbabwe (NUST) and chief executive officer of Mpilo Central Hospital in Bulawayo. He previously served as the hospital's acting chief executive officer and clinical director.

Ngwenya's research focuses on maternal mortality, pre-eclampsia, stillbirth, postpartum haemorrhage and obstetric care in low-resource settings. His work has been published in peer-reviewed medical journals, including BMC Pregnancy and Childbirth, International Journal of Women's Health, Pregnancy Hypertension and Tropical Doctor.

== Early life and education ==
Ngwenya was born in Lupane District, Matabeleland North. He attended primary school in Lupane before completing his secondary education in Bulawayo and at Thornhill High School in Gweru. He graduated in medicine from the University of Zimbabwe and later undertook postgraduate specialist training in obstetrics and gynaecology in Zimbabwe and the United Kingdom, becoming a Fellow of the Royal College of Obstetricians and Gynaecologists. In 2021, he obtained a PhD in medical statistics from NUST.

== Career ==
Ngwenya joined Mpilo Central Hospital as a consultant obstetrician and gynaecologist. He later served as head of obstetrics and gynaecology, clinical director and acting chief executive officer. He was appointed substantive chief executive officer of the hospital in July 2026.

Alongside his clinical practice, Ngwenya joined the faculty of the National University of Science and Technology, Zimbabwe, where he became professor of obstetrics and gynaecology. He is also the founder of the Royal Women's Clinic in Bulawayo.

During the COVID-19 pandemic in Zimbabwe, Ngwenya became a prominent medical commentator in the country. He advocated vaccination, mask wearing and other public-health measures and helped establish COVID-19 PCR testing capacity at Mpilo Central Hospital in collaboration with NUST. In May 2020, he warned that infections among staff and patients at Mpilo could produce a serious outbreak at the hospital.

== Research ==
Ngwenya's research centres on improving maternal and neonatal outcomes in low-resource settings. His publications have examined severe pre-eclampsia, postpartum haemorrhage, maternal mortality, stillbirth, emergency obstetric care and rare obstetric conditions. He has also developed statistical models for predicting adverse maternal and neonatal outcomes in women with severe pre-eclampsia.

== Personal life ==
Ngwenya has publicly advocated the preservation of traditional African cultural practices. He has spoken in support of polygyny, describing it as part of his cultural heritage. His family life has received media attention in Zimbabwe through interviews discussing his polygamous household.

== Selected publications ==
- Ngwenya, Solwayo; Jones, Brian; Mwembe, Desmond; Nare, Hausitoe; Heazell, Alexander E. P. (2021). "Development and validation of risk prediction models for adverse maternal and neonatal outcomes in severe preeclampsia in a low-resource setting, Mpilo Central Hospital, Bulawayo, Zimbabwe". Pregnancy Hypertension. 23: 18–26. doi:10.1016/j.preghy.2020.10.011. PMID 33161225.
- Ngwenya, Solwayo (2017). "Severe preeclampsia and eclampsia: incidence, complications, and perinatal outcomes at a low-resource setting, Mpilo Central Hospital, Bulawayo, Zimbabwe". International Journal of Women's Health. 9: 353–357. doi:10.2147/IJWH.S131934. PMC 5439934. PMID 28553148.
- Masukume, Gwinyai; Sengurayi, Elton; Muchara, Alfred; Mucheni, Emmanuel; Ndebele, Wedu; Ngwenya, Solwayo (2013). "Full-term abdominal extrauterine pregnancy complicated by postoperative ascites with successful outcome: a case report". Journal of Medical Case Reports. 7 10. doi:10.1186/1752-1947-7-10. PMC 3544643. PMID 23302289.

== See also ==
- Healthcare in Zimbabwe
- Maternal health
- Pre-eclampsia
