= Mpilo Hospital =

Coordinates: 20°08′S 28°34′E

Geography
- Location: Bulawayo, Matabeleland, Zimbabwe

Organisation
- Care system: Public
- Type: Tertiary Referral; Teaching hospital
- Affiliated university: National University of Science and Technology; University of Zimbabwe

Services
- Emergency department: 24 hours
- Beds: 1000

History
- Founded: 1958; 68 years ago

Links
- Website: www.mpilo.org.zw
- Chief executive officer: Solwayo Ngwenya

Mpilo Central Hospital, more commonly known as Mpilo Hospital, is the largest hospital in Bulawayo, and second largest in Zimbabwe after Parirenyatwa Hospital in Harare. Mpilo is a public hospital, and referral centre for the Matabeleland North, Matabeleland South and Midlands provinces of Zimbabwe.

The hospital's name, 'Mpilo' means 'life' in the native Ndebele language.

Mpilo has a School of Nursing as well as a School of Midwifery, both of which are located within the hospital campus.

== See also ==
- List of hospitals in Zimbabwe

== External resources ==
- Ministry of Health and Child Welfare: https://web.archive.org/web/20120417102207/http://www.mohcw.gov.zw/index.php?option=com_content&view=article&id=61&Itemid=87
- Rasmussen, R.K., and Rubert, S.C., 1990. Historical Dictionary of Zimbabwe, Scarecrow Press.
