= Zimbabwe United Passenger Company =

Zimbabwean parastatal public transport company

ZUPCO
- Company type: Public
- Industry: Public Transport
- Founded: Harare, Zimbabwe (1985)
- Key people: Chipo Dyanda-Chairman; George Chigora-Vice Chairman
- Revenue: Not Publicly known
- Net income: Not Publicly known
- Number of employees: Not Publicly known
- Website: http://www.zupco.co.zw/

The Zimbabwe United Passenger Company (ZUPCO) is a parastatal company in Zimbabwe, which operates both urban and long-distance bus routes in the country.

== History ==
ZUPCO was formed in 1985 in Harare, soon after the new government was formed. Before Zimbabwean Independence, the bus company was run as a Parastatal and it was known as the Rhodesia Bus Company. After transition, the company was renamed to Zimbabwe United Passenger Company (ZUPCO). By 1993 ZUPCO was operating 1,200 buses on 426 routes.

== Bus services ==
Regional services

The company offers direct and reliable out-of-country bus services to Countries such as Malawi, Zambia, Botswana, South Africa.

Urban services

Urban routes include transport services from the key residential areas to many of the Central business districts in Harare. These include for example the Harare- Chitungwiza route, which travels from a large business district to a large residential area. In line with being a market driven player in the industry, the company has also sought to alleviate the suffering of the urban consumer who has to pay hiked fares during peak hours by commuter omnibuses. Because of this rising problem, the company has reintroduced the urban bus routes at an affordable fare during the morning and evening peak hours.

Rural services

ZUPCO has purposefully invested in and is looking into ways of providing a safe and reliable service for the usually neglected rural residents. Thus the company provides daily scheduled bus service to many rural areas dotted around the country. Like many other bus companies, rural areas are seldom given bus routes, as the cost is very high for a small part of the population.

== Conflicts ==
ZUPCO operations however declined following deregulation of the urban transport sector, and the uprising of individual based mini-bus "combi" services.

In 2006, the former ZUPCO chairman Charles Nherera was arrested for corruption in relation to bus procurement and was jailed.

In February 2016, the company was accused of Corruption, mismanagement, and flouting very important procedures. Many of the buses in Harare were cited to have No fuel, as there was not enough money; Although there was still over $500,000 still sitting in a recapitalization account, and only $10,000 was needed to refuel all buses.

== Accidents ==
On January 18, 2015, one Zupco bus and another bus from a different company Sideswiped. The accident caused 21 passengers to die onsite and 3 later died at the hospital. At least 46 people were seriously injured.

On May 2, 2016, a Zupco bus caught fire after a suspected mechanical problem caused the bus to create an internal flame. The bus was heading to a high school with 70 students inside the bus. All of the students were able to get out without serious injury.

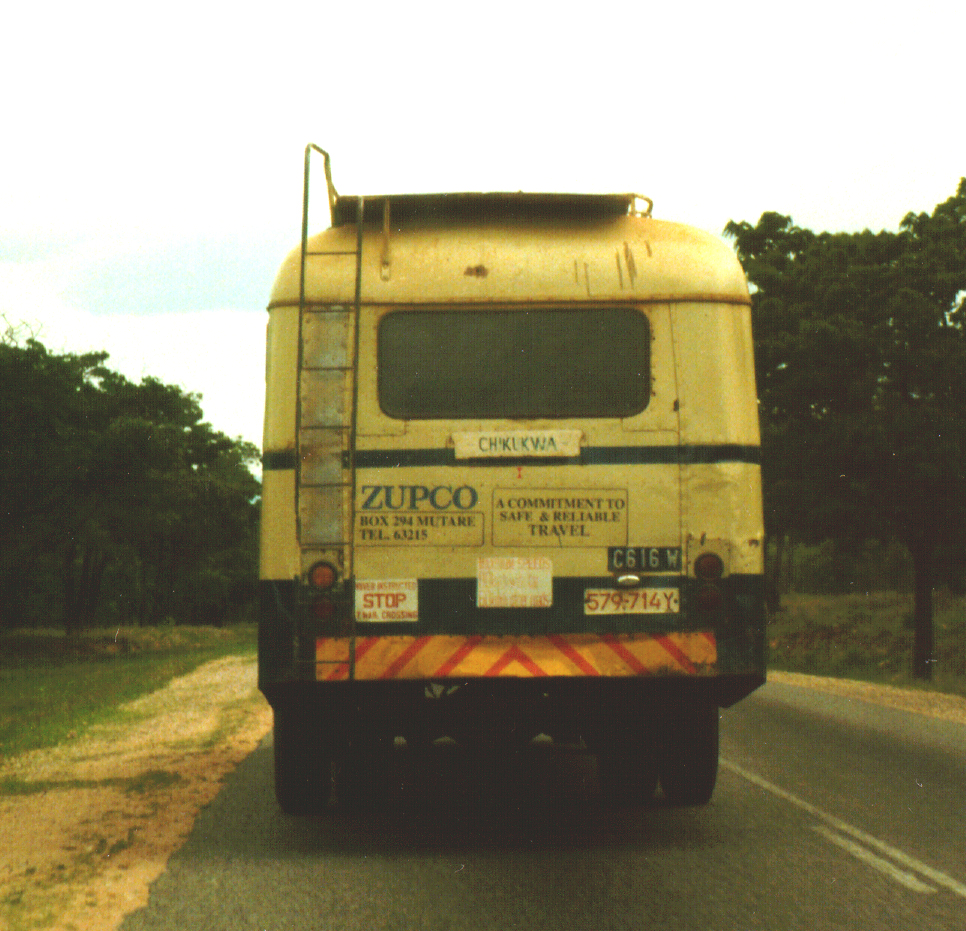
ZUPCO bus
