= Christopher Chetsanga =

Zimbabwean scientist

Christopher J Chetsanga
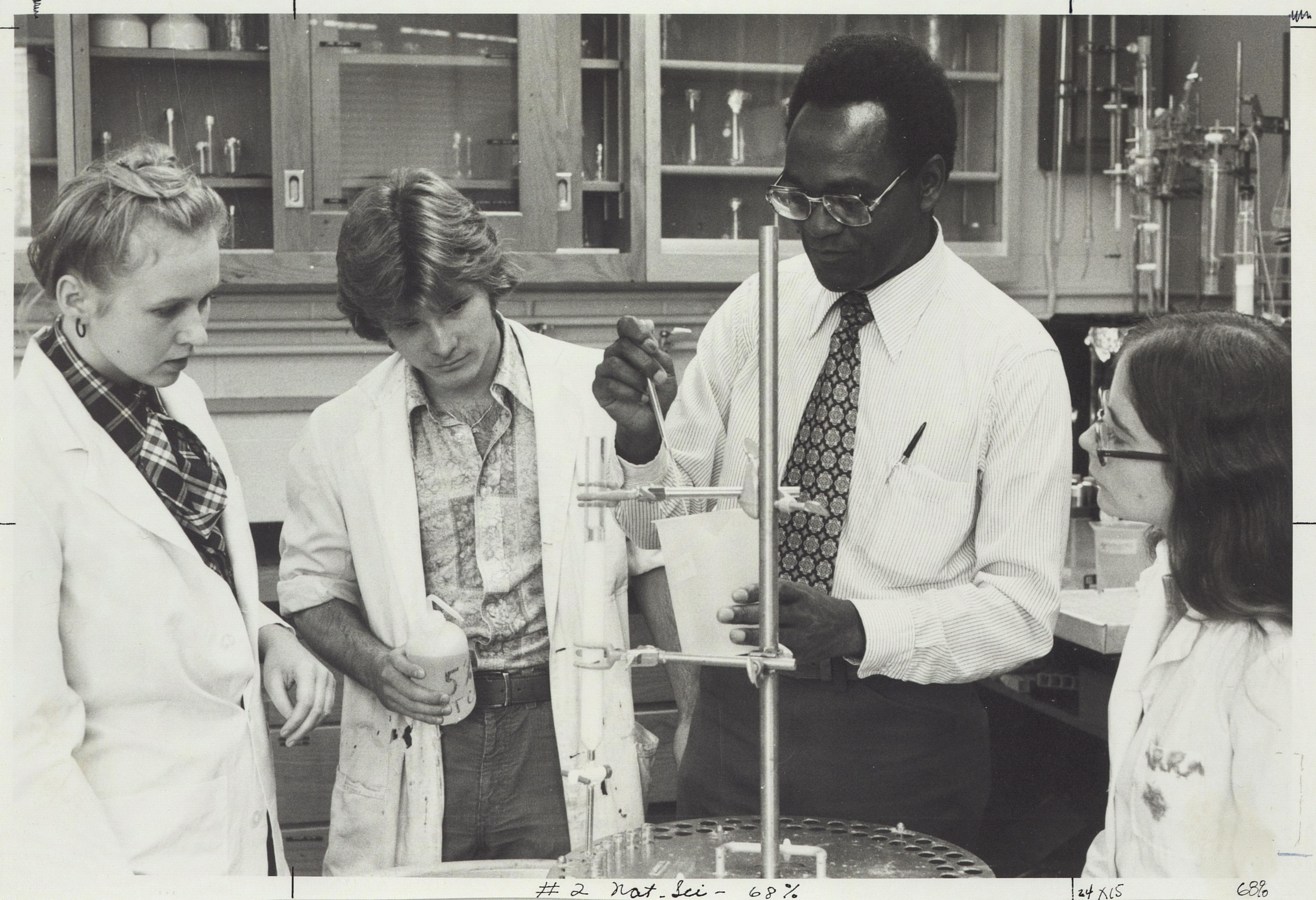
- Christopher Chetsanga demonstrates to students how to do an experiment
- Born: 22 August 1935 (age 91); Murehwa, Rhodesia (now Zimbabwe)
- Education: University of California; Pepperdine University; University of Toronto
- Known for: Discovery of two enzymes involved in DNA repair Academic administration
- Scientific career
- Fields: Biochemistry; Molecular Biology
- Workplaces: Harvard University; University of Michigan; University of Zimbabwe; Scientific and Industrial Research and Development Centre; Zimbabwe Ezekiel Guti University

Christopher J. Chetsanga (born 1935 in Murehwa, Rhodesia) is a prominent Zimbabwean scientist who is a member of the African Academy of Sciences and The World Academy of Sciences. He discovered two enzymes involved in DNA repair. He has also held various academic administrative posts like Vice-Chancellor, Director and Dean.

== Biography ==
Chetsanga was born in Murewa, Zimbabwe on 22 August 1935, and was baptised in 1948. In his youth, he was educated at Nhowe Mission, and went on to study at University of California, Berkeley where he received his BSc in 1965. Chetsanga also studied for a period at Pepperdine University. In 1969, he received his MSc and PhD in biochemistry and molecular biology from University of Toronto before becoming a postdoctoral fellow at Harvard University between 1969 and 1972. Between 1972 and 1983 he became a professor at the University of Michigan, then in 1983 he left to become the senior lecturer in Biochemistry for University of Zimbabwe. In 1990, President Robert Mugabe awarded him President’s Award for Distinguished Contribution to Science and Technology. Has also awarded the Order of the Star of Zimbabwe. He is presently the vice chancellor at Zimbabwe Ezekiel Guti University.

In 2004, when the Zimbabwe Academy of Sciences was formed, Chetsanga was appointed the first president of the academy. Chetsanga advocated the use of genetically modified food sources as a possible solution for food shortages in Africa in 2020.

== Scientific Achievements ==
Chetsanga has discovered two enzymes involved in the repair of damaged DNA: firstly, formamidopyrimidine DNA glycosylase, which removes damaged 7-methylguanine from DNA (1979), and secondly, purine imidazole-ring cyclase, which re-closes imidazole rings of guanine and adenine damaged by x-irradiation (1985).

According to Chetsanga, his research focus in his scientific career has been on DNA and RNA structural and functional details as they relate to cellular metabolism and disease development.

== Select publications ==
- C. J. Chetsanga; V. Boyd; L. Peterson; K. Rushlow (1975). "Single-stranded regions in DNA of old mice" (PDF). Nature. 253 (5487): 130–131. doi:10.1038/253130a0. PMID 1110761. Wikidata Q59071826.
- C. J. Chetsanga; Lindahl, Tomas (1979). "Release of 7-methylguanine residues whose imidazole rings have been opened from damaged DNA by a DNA glycosylase from Escherichia coli". Nucleic Acids Research. 6 (11): 3673–84. doi:10.1093/nar/6.11.3673. PMC 327965. PMID 386277. Wikidata Q24632415.
- C J Chetsanga; C Grigorian (1985). "In situ enzymatic reclosure of opened imidazole rings of purines in DNA damaged by gamma-irradiation". Proceedings of the National Academy of Sciences of the United States of America. 82 (3): 633–7. Bibcode:1985PNAS...82..633C. doi:10.1073/pnas.82.3.633. PMC 397099. PMID 3856219. Wikidata Q24568209.
