= Kan Wang =

Chinese-American agronomist (born 1957)

- Born: 1957 (age 68–69)

Academic background
- Education: BS, Biochemistry, 1982, Fudan University; PhD, Plant Biology, 1987, Ghent University
- Thesis: 軸對稱金屬冷鍛之成形極限 / Zhou dui cheng jin shu leng duan zhi cheng xing ji xian (1987)
- Doctoral advisor: Marc Van Montagu

Academic work
- Institutions: Iowa State University
- Doctoral students: Rachel Chikwamba

Kan Wang (born 1957) is a Chinese-American agronomist. As a professor at Iowa State University, Wang was elected a Fellow of the American Association for the Advancement of Science for her "advances in genetic engineering in plants using Agrobacterium tumefaciens."

== Early life and education ==
Wang completed her Bachelor of Science degree in biochemistry from Fudan University in 1982 and her PhD in plant biology from the Ghent University. Her thesis advisor was Marc Van Montagu.

== Career ==
Wang joined the Agronomy Department at Iowa State University in December 1995 as the director of the newly established Plant Transformation Facility. She later held the Global Professorship in Biotechnology. In 2007, she collaborated with Brian Trewyn, Francois Torney, and Victor Lin to become the first scientists to use nanotechnology to penetrate rigid plant cell walls and deliver DNA and chemicals with precise control. Wang later demonstrated the ability to deliver proteins and DNA into plant cells simultaneously using mesoporous silica nanoparticles. As a result of her research, she was honored with one of the 2015 Iowa Women of Innovation Award.

As a full professor, Wang received a three-year, $830,000 grant from the National Science Foundation to "develop a suite of technological tools that could allow scientists to develop yams with improved yields, nutritional value and better resistance to stresses." She was later awarded the 2017 Fellow Award from the Society for In Vitro Biology. During the COVID-19 pandemic, Wang was elected a Fellow of the American Association for the Advancement of Science for her "advances in genetic engineering in plants using Agrobacterium tumefaciens." She also received the 2020 Outstanding Achievement in Research Award.
