= Rachel Chikwamba =

Zimbabwean plant geneticist

Rachel K Chikwamba
- Born: 1967 (age 58–59)
- Education: BSc University of Zimbabwe; MSc University of Queensland; PhD Iowa State University; MBA University of Pretoria
- Scientific career
- Fields: Plant genetics
- Workplaces: Council for Scientific and Industrial Research; University of Pretoria
- Thesis: Maize as production and delivery vehicle of edible vaccines against the enterotoxigenic Escherichia coli and the swine transmissible gastroenteritis (TGE) (2002)
- Doctoral advisor: Kan Wang

Rachel Kerina Chikwamba is a Zimbabwean plant geneticist born in 1967. She is in the Council for Scientific and Industrial Research (CSIR) Group Executive: Strategic Alliances and Communication. She is an active member of the Academy of Science of South Africa.

== Research and career ==
Chikwamba obtained an undergraduate degree in Crop Science from the University of Zimbabwe, and later graduated from the University of Queensland with a master's degree. In 2002, she obtained her PhD in genetics from Iowa State University, with a dissertation exploring the production of novel proteins in plants. She then worked as a post-doctoral research associate at Arizona State University's Center for Infectious Disease and Vaccinology within the Biodesign Institute. There, her research focused on the expression and assembly of plant proteins. Chikwamba also holds an MBA from the Gordon Institute of Business Science at the University of Pretoria.

Chikwamba's research involves plant manufactured pharmaceuticals and metabolic engineering. Using mainly sorghum, maize and banana, she explores three main research avenues: improving the nutritional quality of food crops; using plants to produce biomolecules of pharmaceutical interest; and investigating biochemical pathways of indigenous plants with medicinal value.

Chikwamba chairs the board of the Applied Centre for Climate and Earth Systems Science (ACCESS). She has worked at the Council for Scientific and Industrial Research (CSIR) since 2004, in various capacities. She helped develop the Health Research Impact Area strategy, and served two terms on the CSIR's Strategic Research Panel. As Chief Researcher and Competence Area Manager at CSIR Biosciences, she facilitated major global partnerships for CSIR, and was the lead for the African Biofortified Sorghum (ABS) project, which aim to produce nutritionally fortified sorghum, focusing on pro-vitamin A, protein quality and mineral bioavailability. As a principal investigator for CSIR, she led a number of both internationally and locally funded projects including European Union Framework projects, the Gates Grand Challenge on nutritional fortification, the GreenPharm initiative (which aims to make antibody therapeutics using plant-based technology), and New Partnership for Africa's Development/Biofisa projects. Chikwamba was on the team which produced RabiVir, an antibody treatment made from plant leaves to treat rabies.

In October 2011, she was made CSIR Group Executive: Strategic Alliances and Communication, and in this capacity she managed partnerships, stakeholder interactions, and associated communication. She also held the position of CSIR Group Executive: Chemicals, Agriculture, Food and Health. In late 2019, Chikwamba was elected the Director General of the International Crops Research Institute for the Semi-Arid Tropics (ICRISAT), but for personal reasons did not take up the position.

During her career, Chikwamba was also a lecturer with the University of Pretoria's Departments of Plant Science, of Botany, and of Forestry and Agricultural Biotechnology Institute (FABI). In this capacity, she leads a program to genetically improve banana and maize crops. She was made an Honorary Research Fellow at St George's Hospital at the University of London.

Additionally, has been, or is currently serving on the African Union high-level committee on Science, Technology and Innovation Strategy for Africa 2024 (STISA 2024), on the board of the South African Medical Research Council, on the African Union's High Level African Panel on Emerging Technologies (APET), on the Global Governing Board of ICRISAT, and on the Board of Directors of the Wits Health Consortium.
