= Caroline Gombakomba =

Zimbabwean radio journalist

- Born: April 7, 1968; Harare, Rhodesia
- Died: December 18, 2008 (aged 40); Silver Spring, Maryland, U.S.
- Education: University of Zimbabwe (B.A., 1990)
- Occupation: Radio journalist

Caroline Netsai Gombakomba (April 7, 1968 – December 18, 2008) was a Zimbabwean radio journalist. After a career at the Zimbabwe Broadcasting Corporation, Gombakomba left her home country due to political repression and eventually settled in the United States, where she worked for Voice of America's Studio 7.

== Biography ==
Caroline Gombakomba was born in 1968 in what is now Harare, Zimbabwe. She obtained a bachelor's in sociology from the University of Zimbabwe, which was then the only institute of higher learning in the country, in 1990.

In the early 1990s, she began working as a newscaster for the state-run Zimbabwe Broadcasting Corporation's "Newsreel" and "Newsbeat" programs. Later, fearing for her life as state media became increasingly politicized, she left her country in 2001, settling first in Toronto, Canada, and later in the United States.

Beginning in 2003, Bombakomba reported and hosted for Voice of America's Studio 7 broadcasts in Zimbabwe. The broadcasts included her announcing the news in her mother tongue of Shona. Her work included persistent coverage of health issues, such as HIV/AIDS, in Zimbabwe. She also led coverage of the forcible slum-clearing effort known as Operation Murambatsvina in 2005, earning a high commendation from the International Association of Broadcasters. That same year, the Zimbabwean government attempted to seize her passport and prevent her from traveling.

Gombakomba was a devoted Christian throughout her life. At only 40 years old, in 2008, she died of breast cancer in Silver Spring, Maryland. She was buried nearby in Washington, as the Zimbabwean government allegedly would not allow for the return of her body to her home country.
