= Emmanuel Ngara =

Emmanuel Ngara is a Zimbabwean academic and Pro-Vice-Chancellor of the University of KwaZulu-Natal, South Africa. He has also served as Pro-Vice-Chancellor of the University of Fort Hare, South Africa, and the University of Zimbabwe.

== Essays ==
- Revolutionary Practice and Style in Lusophone Liberation Poetry (1990) - Found in Tejumola Olaniyan and Ato Quayson's African Literature: An Anthology of Criticism and Theory
- HAQAA-3 POLICY BRIEFS SERIES on Continental and Regional Integration in African Higher Education, Policy Brief n.6: "African Higher Education Integration Must go Together With Transformation. The Role of Institutional Leadership (January 2024).
