= Zimbabwe Ezekiel Guti University =

Pentecostal university

- Motto: Committed to Excellence
- Type: Private
- Established: 2012
- Chancellor: Joe Guti
- Vice-Chancellor: Innocent Chirisa
- Location: Bindura, Zimbabwe
- Campus: Bindura
- Website: www.zegu.ac.zw

Zimbabwe Ezekiel Guti University (ZEGU) was established in 2012 in Bindura, Zimbabwe. It is the first Pentecostal University in Zimbabwe.
