= Cowdeng Chikomba =

Zimbabwean academic

Cowdeng Chikomba is a Zimbabwean academic. He was the first Vice-Chancellor of the Bindura University of Science Education.
