= Bothwell Mbuwayesango =

Zimbabwean pediatric surgeon

Bothwell Anesu Mbuwayesango
- Education: University of Zimbabwe
- Known for: Separation of conjoined twins
- Scientific career
- Fields: Medicine, Pediatric Surgeon
- Workplaces: University of Zimbabwe College of Health Sciences

Bothwell Anesu Mbuwayesango is a Zimbabwean pediatric surgeon who successfully led an all Zimbabwean team that separated conjoined twins in 2014 during an eight-hour operation at Harare hospital; it was the country's second successful separation, the first was in 1985. The two-month-old male twins were joined at the chest and abdomen (including the liver - which can bleed heavily if cut). In 2021 Mbuwayesango led another successful separation during an eighteen-hour surgery at the same hospital. Mr Mbuwayesango was a Council member of the Medical and Dental Practitioners Council of Zimbabwe. He has published articles in the medical literature.

== Research interests ==
- Gastroschisis
- Obstructive jaundice
- Intussusception
- Minimal access surgery

=== External video ===
Separating siamese twins in a low resource hospital
