= Tracey Rouault =

American rheumatologist and physician-scientist

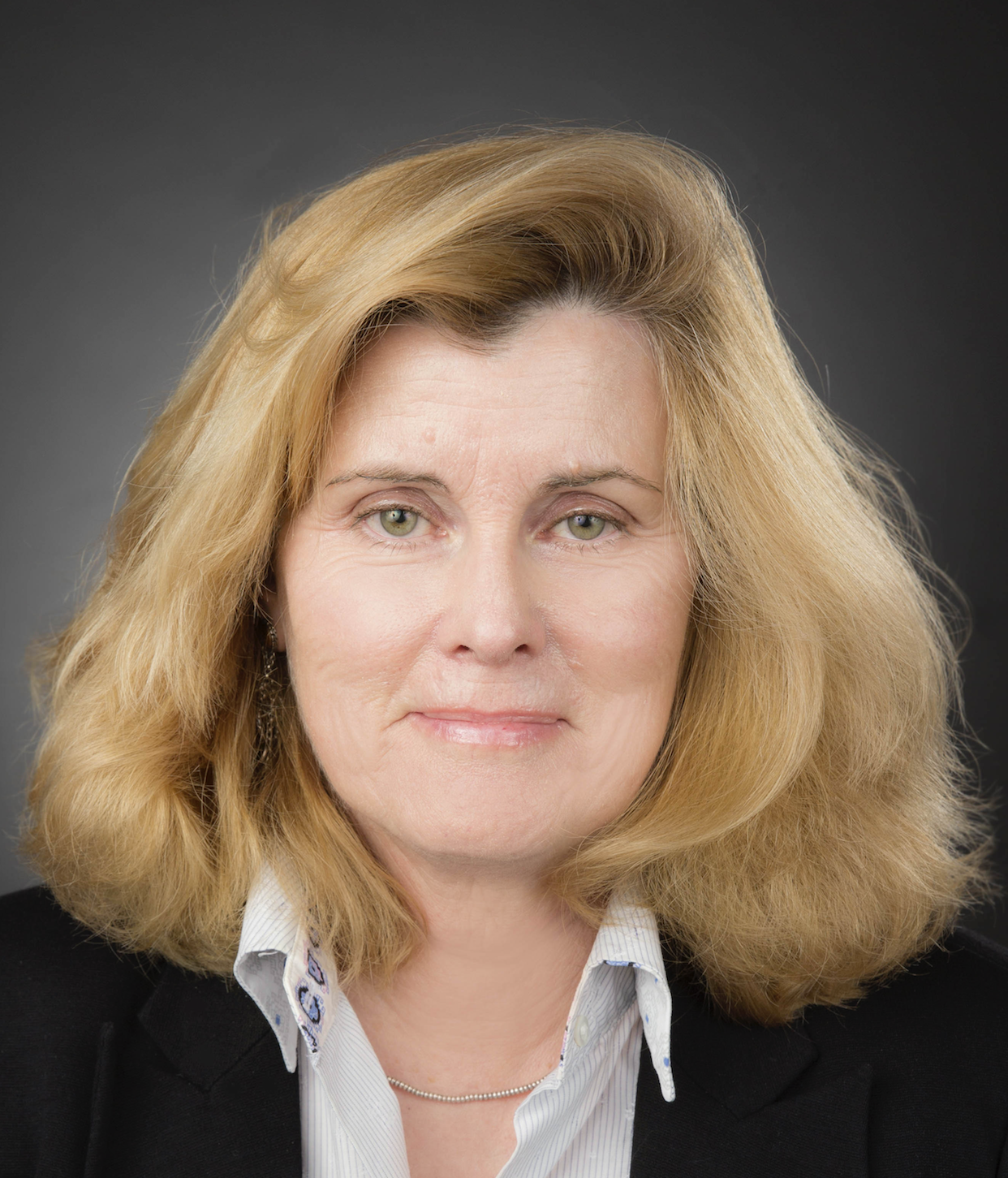
- Education: Yale College; Duke University School of Medicine
- Scientific career
- Fields: Iron-sulfur proteins, human iron metabolism
- Workplaces: Eunice Kennedy Shriver National Institute of Child Health and Human Development

Tracey Ann Rouault is an American rheumatologist and physician-scientist who researches mammalian iron-sulfur proteins. Rouault is a senior investigator at the Eunice Kennedy Shriver National Institute of Child Health and Human Development and she heads the section on human iron metabolism.

== Life ==
Tracey Rouault completed bachelor's degree in biology at Yale College, and earned a M.D. from Duke University School of Medicine, after which she completed training in internal medicine and rheumatology at Duke University and became board certified in both specialties.

She came to the National Institutes of Health (NIH) as a human genetics fellow in the Eunice Kennedy Shriver National Institute of Child Health and Human Development (NICHD), and was subsequently promoted to head of the section on human iron metabolism, and then to head of the metals biology and molecular medicine branch. She was elected to the American College of Physicians, received a distinguished alumnus award from Duke Medical Center, and has twice received the NIH Director's Award for outstanding accomplishments in iron metabolism. Rouault's laboratory researches the regulation of mammalian iron metabolism. Early work involved cloning and characterization of iron regulatory proteins 1 and 2 (IRPs), and elucidation of how these proteins sense cytosolic iron levels and regulate expression of iron metabolism genes. IRPs bind to RNA stem-loops known as iron-responsive elements (IREs) in transcripts that encode iron metabolism genes, including ferritin, transferrin receptor 1, ferroportin, HIF2 alpha, and several other transcripts. IRP1 acquires an iron-sulfur cluster in iron-replete cells that prevents it from binding to IREs, and enables it to function as a cytosolic aconite. The discovery of the iron-sulfur cluster in IRP1 led to studies of mechanisms of iron-sulfur cluster biogenesis, which resulted in characterization of a mammalian cysteine desulfurase, NFS1, a primary scaffold known as ISCU, a secondary scaffold known as NFU1, an NFS1 binding partner, ISD11, and a cochaperone known as HSC20. Defective iron sulfur biogenesis causes several diseases, including Friedreich ataxia, and four new diseases that our group helped to discover and characterize, including ISCU myopathy, sideroblastic anemia from GLRX5 deficiency, and lactic acidosis caused by mutations in NFU1 and BOLA3.

The Rouault lab discovered that animals that lacked IRP2 developed adult-onset neurodegeneration with prominent motor neuron disease, and studies demonstrated that functional iron deficiency adversely affected mitochondrial function in neurons. Her group collaborated to identify two human patients with IRP2 deficiency related neurodegenerative disease. The lab also discovered several interesting phenotypes in mice that lack IRP1 that have relevance to human disease. The group studies metabolic remodeling that occurs in kidney cancers caused by mutations in fumarate hydratase and succinate dehydrogenase, subunit B. The metabolic remodeling extends to iron metabolism and iron sulfur protein activities. Rouault's lab discovered that heme oxygenase 1 deficiency causes iron redistribution because lack of heme oxygenase 1 leads to death of erythrophagocytosing macrophages, and the lab is attempting to prevent disease in heme oxygenase deficient mice by performing bone marrow transplants and infusing macrophages exogenously to supply the mice with normal macrophages. Rouault's group discovered that the Q248H mutation of ferroportin likely protects against malaria because it reduces iron contents of red cells and deprives malaria parasites of important nutrition. This mutation is prevalent amongst African Americans, and it may explain some health disparities to which African Americans are predisposed.
