= Zimbabwe Open University =

Educational initiative

Coordinates: 17.783221°S 31.053693°E

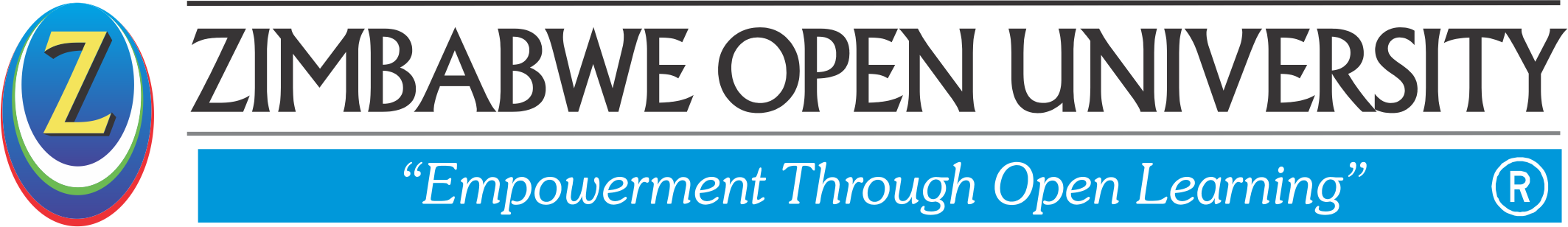
- Motto: Empowerment Through Open Learning
- Type: Public
- Established: 1999
- Chancellor: President Emmerson Mnangagwa
- Vice-Chancellor: Professor A.C. Ncube
- Academic staff: 36 Professors; 171 Academic Staff
- Administrative staff: 559
- Students: 30,185
- Location: P. O. Box MP 1119 Mount Pleasant, Harare, Harare, Zimbabwe
- Website: www.zou.ac.zw

Zimbabwe Open University (ZOU) is an open distance education university in Zimbabwe. Established in 1999, ZOU is the only distance education university in the country that offers an opportunity for students to earn as they learn. Student enrollment at ZOU has been growing steadily from the time of its formation and in terms of enrollment it is the largest university in Zimbabwe.

The Zimbabwe Open University has seven faculties under which the academic programmes are conducted. ZOU is in the process of building its main campus at Hatcliffe. The university is also offering new programs to cater to the dynamic needs of students from across Zimbabwe and beyond.

== History ==
After independence, the Government of Zimbabwe adopted a policy of education for all. To address the need for high-skilled manpower, the 5-Year National Development Plan (1991–1995) stated:

Investment in human resources development is investment in human capital and complements investment in physical and technological innovation. The natural environment can support higher population levels only through technological progress, which requires continued investment in human resources development. Since 1980, GOZ (the Government of Zimbabwe) has aimed at creating an education system that would address the socio-economic needs of the country.

The University of Zimbabwe, which was the single university in the country at that time, could not cope with the demand for university education. Two commissions were established: the Williams Commission (1981) and the Zimbabwe Open University Feasibility Study (1986). In July 1994, a committee was formed to investigate the development of university distance education. The commission recommended that there is need for distance education at university level to upgrade skills and "to provide a continuing education facility for the adult population". Based on these recommendations the Centre for Distance Education (CDE) of the University of Zimbabwe was formed in 1993. In 1996, it became the University College of Distance Education (UCDE) and finally renamed to Zimbabwe Open University (ZOU) on 1 March 1999, by an Act of Parliament. The first Vice-Chancellor was Professor Peter Dzvimbo.

Below is a table showing student enrolment in the Zimbabwe Open University from 1999 to 2017:

Year	1999	2000	2001	2002	2003	2004	2005	2006
Total student enrolment	14,313	16,995	23,161	17,770	19,228	20, 400		

The year 2001 marked the increase in the enrollment figures to 23,161. It was because Commerce degrees were introduced that year. There was a decline in student enrollment in 2002 because some found independent learning difficult and many students faced economic difficulties. In 2003, a total of 19,228 students were enrolled in the university which constituted 46.9% of the total university enrolment in the country. According to 2006 estimates, approximately 20,000 students are enrolled in the university which makes it the largest university in Zimbabwe.

== Vision and mission ==
According to the website of the university, ZOU's vision is the

"VISION" To be the university of choice in open and distance learning.

MISSION" Empowering the world through high-quality open and distance learning enabled by technology, 2018".

The core ideology of the university is "to develop a best-practice enterprise-culture-based open and distance learning university focused on influencing development and change". ZOU's website states its mission is "to empower people through lifelong learning, thereby enabling them to realise their full potential in an affordable and flexible manner while executing their various endeavours".

== Academics ==
The Zimbabwe Open University is a multidisciplinary and inter-faculty institution. It offers both degree courses and nondegree courses. The university has six faculties: the Faculty of Science and technology, the Faculty of Arts and Education, the Faculty of Commerce and Law, Faculty of Applied Social Sciences, Faculty Agriculture and Faculty of Information Technology. A total of 24 programmes are offered under these faculties. As of 2006;

The Faculty of Education:

- Department of Educational Studies
- Department of Teacher Development.

The Faculty of Science and Technology has four departments:

- Department of Health Science,
- Department of Mathematics and Statistics
- Department of Geography and Environmental Studies.

The Faculty of Commerce is the largest faculty. It has three departments:

- Department of Banking and Finance Management and Business Studies
- Department of Accounting
- Department of Human Resources, Marketing and Labour Relations.

The Faculty of Agriculture has three Department:

- Department of Agricultural Management
- Department of Animal Production - Work in Progress
- Department of Soils and Plant Sciences - Work in Progress

Faculty of IT and Multimedia Communications has two departments:

- Department of Information Technology
- Department of Software Engineering

Faculty of Applied Social Sciences

- Department of Counselling
- Department of Development Studies
- Department of Disability Studies
- Department of Information Science and Records Management
- Department of Peace
- Department of Psychology

Faculty of Arts, Culture and Heritage Studies:

- Department of Heritage Studies
- Department of Languages and Literature
- Department of Media and Journalism Studies
- Department of Religious Studies and Philosophy

The course delivery methods include print media, compact cassettes, videocassettes, telephone, fax, e-mail, CDs and radio broadcasts. ZOU arranges for its students monthly face-to-face meetings with tutors in its regional centers. The university is envisaging the introduction of telelearning/teleteaching methods in its course delivery.

ZOU was a partner in the Electronic Distance Training on Sustainability in African Local Governments (EDITOSIA), a project started in 2001 aimed at formulating recommendations for policymakers of the government, training institutions, municipal associations and other agencies regarding promotion of teaching methods for building the capacity of African governments to deal with the challenges of local sustainability.

ZOU has partnered with the Foundation of Angel of Hope led by Zimbabwe `s First lady to give women a chance to improve their lives through offering free learning to Zimbabwe's disadvantaged women. The programme is intended to cover all of Zimbabwe's provinces to empower women in different life skills. The First lady, Mrs Mnangagwa urged all women, young and old to go back to school to benefit their families and communities. The Vice Chancellor of ZOU, Professor Paul Gundani and his team embraced the programme and were ready to offer their guidance to the benefiting women.

=== Library ===
The library of the university was fundamental in the success of ZOU. The libraries consist of a branch in each of the regional centers handled by two people. These libraries are very popular. The administration of all the libraries in different regional centers are centralized to maintain uniformity and easy coordination. The library of ZOU has agreement with other universities in the country under the Zimbabwe University Libraries Associations to use each other's facilities.

== Effects on the nation ==
According to Mr Mhlotswa, the Deputy Librarian of the Zimbabwe Open University, the course on agriculture offered by ZOU has contributed significantly to the land reform programme in the country. The industry also praised the university as many of their employees have improved performance after undergoing the ZOU programmes. Graduates from the ZOU are established in almost every sector of the economy of Zimbabwe.

== Notable alumni ==
- Florence Mudzingwa, disability rights activist, social enterprise founder and writer
- Rudolf Nyandoro, Catholic bishop
