= Purine imidazole-ring cyclase =

purine imidazole-ring cyclase

Identifiers
- EC no.: 4.3.2.4
- CAS no.: 95990-28-6

Databases
- IntEnz: IntEnz view
- BRENDA: BRENDA entry
- ExPASy: NiceZyme view
- KEGG: KEGG entry
- MetaCyc: metabolic pathway
- PRIAM: profile
- PDB structures: RCSB PDB PDBe PDBsum
- Gene Ontology: AmiGO / QuickGO
Search
- PMC: articles
- PubMed: articles
- NCBI: proteins

The enzyme purine imidazole-ring cyclase (EC 4.3.2.4) catalyzes the chemical reaction

DNA 4,6-diamino-5-formamidopyrimidine $\rightleftharpoons$ DNA adenine + H_{2}O

This enzyme belongs to the family of lyases, specifically amidine lyases. The systematic name of this enzyme class is DNA-4,6-diamino-5-formamidopyrimidine C^{8}-N^{9}-lyase (cyclizing DNA-adenine-forming). Other names in common use include DNA-4,6-diamino-5-formamidopyrimidine 8-C,9-N-lyase (cyclizing), DNA-4,6-diamino-5-formamidopyrimidine 8-C,9-N-lyase (cyclizing, DNA-adenine-forming).
