= Michael Gelfand =

African professor of medicine (1912–1985)

Michael Gelfand, CBE
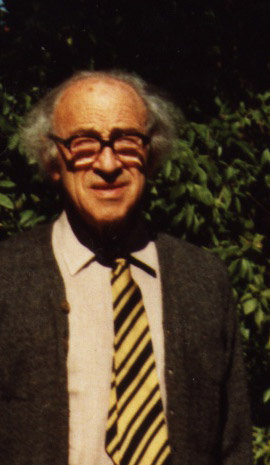
- Born: 26 December 1912; Wynberg, Cape Town, Cape Province, Union of South Africa
- Died: 19 July 1985 (aged 73); Harare, Zimbabwe
- Education: University of Cape Town
- Occupation: Physician
- Known for: working as a tropical medic
- Awards: Order of the Knighthood of St. Sylvester, OBE, CBE
- Scientific career
- Fields: Medicine
- Workplaces: Godfrey Huggins School of Medicine

Michael Gelfand, CBE, (December 1912 – July 1985) was a Zimbabwean medical practitioner of tropical medicine, who received a Papal Order of the Knighthood of St. Sylvester.

== Early life and education ==
Gelfand was born 26 December 1912 in Wynberg, Cape Province, Union of South Africa to immigrant Jewish-Lithuanian parents. He attended Wynberg Boys' High School and obtained his degree in medicine from the University of Cape Town in 1936. His further medical training was in London.

== Career ==
Gefland first practiced medicine in South Africa and the United Kingdom before joining the Southern Rhodesia Medical Service as physician, pathologist and radiologist in 1939. After he began government service, he was known as the only doctor to correctly diagnose the illness of the wife of the Head of the Medical Services.

In 1955, Gelfand founded the Central African Journal of Medicine with Joseph Ritchken, and remained its co-editor for many years. In 1962, he joined the University College of Rhodesia and Nyasaland as founding Professor of African Medicine. From 1970, until his retirement in 1977, he was Professor and Head of Department of Medicine, and thereafter emeritus Professor and Senior Clinical Research Fellow.

His works on rheumatic diseases were used as references for further study as well as in to complications related to tuberculosis, HIV, and other diseases.

Gelfand wrote a total of 330 articles and monographs in various journals on topics ranging from medicine, ethics, philosophy, history, Shona custom, religion, and culture, with titles including "Migration of African Labourers in Rhodesia and Nyasaland (1890 - 1914)". He wrote more than 30 books, amongst them The Sick African and Livingstone, the Doctor.

In a 1979 article "The infrequencey of homosexuality in traditional Shona society," for The Central African Journal of Medicine, Gelfand noted: "The traditional Shona have none of the problems associated with homosexuality [so] obviously they must have a valuable method of bringing up children, especially with regards to normal sex relations, thus avoiding this anomaly so frequent in Western society." Despite strongly homophobic attitudes existing in Shona society, homosexuality has historically been present.

== Personal life and death ==
Gelfand married Esther Kollenberg, a Bulawayan, whom he had met at the University of Cape Town. They had three daughters. He was a practitioner of Judaism.

Gelfand died on 19 July 1985, while attending a patient in the Avenues Clinic in Harare, Zimbabwe. Due to his popularity as a physician, Prime Minister Robert Mugabe gave an address at his funeral.

== Selected publications ==
- The Sick African (1944)
- Schistosomiasis in South-Central Africa (1950)
- Medicine and Magic of the Mashona (1956)
- Shona Ritual (1959)
- Medicine in Tropical Africa (1961)
- Medicine and Custom in Africa (1964)
- An African's Religion (1966)
- The African Witch (1967)
- African Crucible (1968)
- Diet and Tradition in an African Culture (1971)
- The Genuine Shona (1973)
- A Non-Racial Island of Learning: A History of the University of Rhodesia (1978)
- The Spiritual Beliefs Of The Shona: A Study Based On Field Work Among The East Central Shona (1982)
- The Traditional medical practitioner in Zimbabwe: His principles of practice and pharmacopoeia (Zambeziana, Vol 17) (1985)
