= Blessing Mudavanhu =

Zimbabwean mathematician, executive, academic, businessman and entrepreneur

- Born: Blessing Mudavanhu; 26 May 1971 (age 55); Zimbabwe
- Education: University of Zimbabwe (Bachelor of Science); University of California Berkeley (Master of Science); University of Washington (Doctor of Philosophy)
- Occupations: Mathematician, corporate executive, academic, businessman and entrepreneur
- Years active: 2002–present
- Title: President and CEO; Dura Capital Limited

Blessing Mudavanhu (born 26 May 1971) is a Zimbabwean mathematician, corporate executive, academic, businessman and entrepreneur, who is the founder and president of Dura Capital Limited, a company that he founded in 2006, at the age of 35 years. Effective 1 June 2018, he serves as the Group CEO of CBZ Holdings, a financial services conglomerate (company) in Zimbabwe.

From January 2015 until his resignation in August 2016, he served as the Acting Group CEO of BancABC, a financial services conglomerate, with subsidiaries in six African countries.

== Background and education ==
He was born in Zimbabwe on 26 May 1971 and attended Zimbabwean schools for his pre-university education. He studied at the University of Zimbabwe, graduating with a Bachelor of Science in mathematics. He later obtained a Master of Financial Engineering, from the University of California Berkeley. In 2002, he was awarded a Doctor of Philosophy in mathematics, from the University of Washington, which he attended on a Fulbright scholarship.

== Career ==
Following the completion of graduate school, he joined American International Group (AIG), as a Senior Risk Analytics Associate, based in New York City. When he left AIG, he joined Bank of America Merrill Lynch as director of Global Risk Management responsible for New York City, London, Mexico City and Sao Paulo.

He joined BancABC Group in 2009, as "Group Chief Risk Officer", based in Johannesburg. In January 2015, Dr. Mudavanhu was appointed Group CEO. He resigned that position in August 2016, and resigned from BancABC Group, in January 2017.

== Other responsibilities ==
Blessing Mudavanhu is an associate professor in the Graduate School of Business at the University of Cape Town. He is also a Visiting Senior Lecturer in the School of Computer Science and Applied Mathematics and Sessional Lecturer in the business school at the University of the Witwatersrand, in Johannesburg, South Africa. He previously served as Adjunct Professor of Risk Management in the Financial Mathematics Program at the Baruch College of the City University of New York. In August 2017, he was appointed, as a non-executive director, to the board of the Development Bank of Southern Africa, to serve a renewable three-year term.

== See also ==
- Economy of Zimbabwe
- Economy of South Africa
