= Innocent Gangaidzo =

Zimbabwean gastroenterologist

Innocent Tichaona Gangaidzo MA, BM BCh, DTM&H, FRCP
- Education: University of Oxford; University of London; University of Newcastle (Australia)
- Known for: President ECSACOP; President Medical and Dental Practitioners Council of Zimbabwe; Editor-in-chief Central African Journal of Medicine
- Scientific career
- Fields: Gastroenterology
- Workplaces: University of Zimbabwe

Innocent Tichaona Gangaidzo, is a Zimbabwean gastroenterologist, who was the president of the East, Central, and Southern Africa College of Physicians (ECSACOP) from 2020 to 2022. Gangaidzo is the current editor-in-chief of the Central African Journal of Medicine.

== Career ==
In 1984, Gangaidzo graduated in medicine from the University of Oxford. In 1985, he was practising in Oxford.

He earned master's degrees in clinical epidemiology and biostatistics from the University of Newcastle in Australia, and in physiological sciences from the University of Oxford. In addition, he has a Diploma in Tropical Medicine and Hygiene from the University of London. In Birmingham and London, he received specialized training in internal medicine and gastroenterology.

His areas of interest include colorectal cancer and African iron excess as well as gastroenterological and hepatological diseases, in particular. Gangaidzo has received grants from a number of international organizations, such as the National Institutes of Health. ECSACOP's first vice president and the current college president is Professor Gangaidzo.

He was president of the Medical and Dental Practitioners Council of Zimbabwe from 2010 to 2015. He is described as a leading practitioner.

== Selected publications ==
- Innocent T Gangaidzo; Moyo VM; Mvundura E; et al. (17 August 2001). "Association of pulmonary tuberculosis with increased dietary iron". The Journal of Infectious Diseases. 184 (7): 936–939. doi:10.1086/323203. ISSN 0022-1899. PMID 11528590. Wikidata Q74442113.
- H. Khumalo; Z. A. Gomo; V. M. Moyo; V. R. Gordeuk; T. Saungweme; T. A. Rouault; I. T. Gangaidzo (1 January 1998). "Serum transferrin receptors are decreased in the presence of iron overload". Clinical Chemistry. 44 (1): 40–44. ISSN 0009-9147. PMID 9550556. Wikidata Q50895148.
- I T Gangaidzo; V M Moyo; T Saungweme; et al. (1 August 1999). "Iron overload in urban Africans in the 1990s". Gut. 45 (2): 278–283. doi:10.1136/gut.45.2.278. ISSN 0017-5749. PMC 1727612. PMID 10403742. Wikidata Q35356427.
