= Madeline Nyamwanza-Makonese =

Zimbabwean Doctor

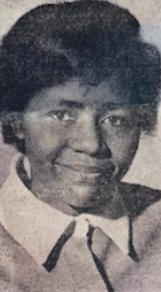
- from 1970 newspaper
- Occupation: doctor

Madeline Nyamwanza-Makonese is the first Zimbabwean female doctor, the second African woman to become a doctor, and the first African woman to graduate from the University of Rhodesia Medical School. She graduated from the University of Rhodesia Medical School in 1970. Madeline's success is significant and was a huge step forward for women in Zimbabwe, where women are considered culturally unequal to men.

== Background ==
She was the seventh child in a family of nine. She was born at St Augustine Mission, Penhalonga where her father worked at the mission farm.

== Legacy and recognition ==
Nyamwanza-Makonese's graduation in 1970 attracted international attention. In January 1971, The Guardian, a New York weekly, published this report: "She is one of a relative handful of blacks ever permitted a higher education in this white racist-dominated country." The report presented her achievement in the context of the fight against colonial rule.

President Emmerson Mnangagwa awarded her the Robert Gabriel Mugabe Commendation Award for Service in Human Capital Development for her contributions to healthcare in August 2025, during the 45th Heroes Day celebrations at the National Heroes Acre. She was also given the Ellen Kuzwayo Council Award by the University of Johannesburg in November 2025 for "her pioneering contribution to medicine and her lifelong commitment to empowering women in Africa." In 2026, the Zimbabwe Women Doctors Association gave her its Lifetime Dedication Award.

Since her graduation, more than 600 Black women have qualified as doctors in Zimbabwe, including cardiologists, radiologists, oncologists and paediatricians. She has offered guidance to younger women doctors and nurses and has been promoting the education and health equity of women. She is quoted as saying, "Once a doctor, always a doctor," and continues to practice medicine part time into her eighties. She has encouraged young women not to "allow issues of gender and culture to inhibit your dreams."

== See also ==
- Vida Mungwira, the first African woman to become a doctor from the Federation of Rhodesia and Nyasaland
