= Peter Dzvimbo =

Zimbabwean academic

Peter Dzvimbo is a Zimbabwean academic. He was the first Vice-Chancellor of the Zimbabwe Open University and was Rector of the African Virtual University. He joined the Vaal University of Technology as the Deputy Vice Chancellor: Academic and Research on 1 October 2014. According to the UNESCO Institute for Information Technologies in Education, during his time at the World Bank, he worked in the fields of strategic planning and management in Ghana, Grenada, Jamaica, Mozambique, Namibia, Sierra Leone, St. Lucia, Tanzania, Trinidad and Tobago.
