= Viomak =

- Born: Violet Makunike c. 1966; Mutare, Zimbabwe
- Education: Master's Degree in Education
- Alma mater: University of Zimbabwe,
- Occupations: Activist, Social scientist, Media influencer, Social justice advocate, Disability advocate, Motivational speaker
- Organization: Zimbabwe Institute For Free Expression
- Known for: Protest music against ZANU PF and Robert Mugabe

Viomak Violah Makande is a Zimbabwean born philanthropist, protest musician, political activist, freedom of expression and opinion advocate who now lives in Britain.

== Early life and education ==
Born in Mutare, Manicaland, Viomak holds a B.A. General Degree, a Diploma in Educational Foundations and a Graduate Certificate in Education from the University of Zimbabwe, and a master's degree in education-educational psychology from a Canadian university.

== Life and career ==
Viomak was one of a small group of Zimbabwean musicians who protested against the rule of Robert Mugabe. She commonly echoes the Bible in her songs. Her music is banned from state-owned radio in Zimbabwe. but still can be obtained clandestinely in the country. Some recording companies in Zimbabwe have refused to accept her music. Viomak's struggles has been likened to opposition activists and journalists, who are being harassed and arrested under laws such as POSA. Viomak uses her artistic name in order to protect relatives; Violet or Viola Makoni and Violet or Viola Makunike have been suggested by the ruling party Zanupf's spies after Viomak was placed on a high-profile hit and death list of opposition voices among independent journalists who have since run away from Zimbabwe have faced death threats for despising zanu pf

Viomak fled Zimbabwe for Halifax, Nova Scotia, where she and her husband lived for five years before returning secretly to Zimbabwe in August 2006 via Botswana. She lived in hiding near Harare for four months, concealing her appearance to record two albums at a studio in the city, and then moved to England, where she has been granted political asylum; her husband and two children joined her in Birmingham in 2007.

In May 2007 Viomak set up the Servants of Truth Band in Britain composed of seven well known Zimbabwean musicians. Most of the backing group members have played with other well known Zimbabwean musicians.

On 10 March 2007 Viomak performed at a rally to mark the suffering of Zimbabwean women who cannot afford sanitary wear.

On 18 April 2008, Zimbabwe's Independence Day, Viomak and her manager launched an Internet radio station, "Voto" (Voices of the Oppressed). The station airs only Zimbabwe protest art with the aim to focus on the importance of freedom of musical expression in a country where opposing voices are severely oppressed.

== Activism and humanitarian projects ==
Viomak is a fundraiser and philanthropist who helps Zimbabweans and Africans in need with a team of Zimbabweans in the UK, Zimbabwe and South Africa.

In 2007 she founded Zimbabwe Institute For Free Expression (ZIFFE) then September 2011 Viomak set up a Facebook group and page to promote freedom of speech and give Zimbabweans a platform to speak out without fear. In 2010, Viomak created Zimbabwe Development Leaders (ZIDELE) political party.

Viomak founded Hope for Zimbabwe Children an organisation that advocates for underprivileged children up to 17 years' rights to provision of healthcare and education. She is also the founder of Hope for Women Survivors where she advocates for vulnerable women's rights. Through Hope for Women Survivors Viomak helps women facing domestic violence and inequality of opportunities. She has worked with several advocacy organisations including Matthew Rusike Children's home, Kubatana, Extreme Trans Children's orphanage, Women Fertility Zimbabwe and Zimbabwe Peace Project.

== Releases ==
- Happy 82nd Birthday President R.G Mugabe (Emotions of the Emotionless). Viomak released this album on 12 February 2006 to mark Mugabe's 82nd birthday.
- Happy 83rd Birthday President R.G Mugabe (Bones of A 30-Year-Old), released in Zimbabwe on 21 February 2007 is a compilation of soulful and hard-hitting ballads as a sequel to her first album Happy 82nd Birthday President R.G Mugabe. This protest music is banned from the airwaves of state-owned media. The eight-track album features songs such as Inzwa Mugabe (Listen Mugabe), Mugabe Usambozvinyengedza (Mugabe don't fool yourself), and Mangwanani Baba (Good morning daddy).
- Happy 84th Birthday President R.G Matibili (Great son of Malawi), is Viomak's third album, released on 21 February 2008.
