= Central African Journal of Medicine =

The Central African Journal of Medicine
- Discipline: Medicine
- Language: English
- Edited by: Innocent Gangaidzo

Publication details
- History: 1953–present
- Frequency: Quarterly

Standard abbreviations
- ISO 4: Cent. Afr. J. Med.

Indexing
- CODEN: CAJMA3
- ISSN: 0008-9176
- OCLC no.: 237378360

Links
- Online access

The Central African Journal of Medicine is a quarterly peer-reviewed general medical journal that aims to advance medical education and research in Africa. The focus is on broad medical themes, which reflect prevalent and significant conditions in the area. It was founded in 1953 by Michael Gelfand and Joseph Ritchken. The publisher is the University of Zimbabwe Publications As of February 2023, over 4000 articles have been published in this journal.
