= Charles Nherera =

Zimbabwean educationalist

Charles Nherera is a Zimbabwean educationalist. He was founding Vice–Chancellor of Chinhoyi University of Technology and chairman of the parastatal Zimbabwe United Passenger Company (ZUPCO). He was arrested for corruption, in connection with the latter post, in 2006 and jailed.

The charges were later quashed by the High Court.
