= Pride Chigwedere =

Zimbabwean physician-scientist

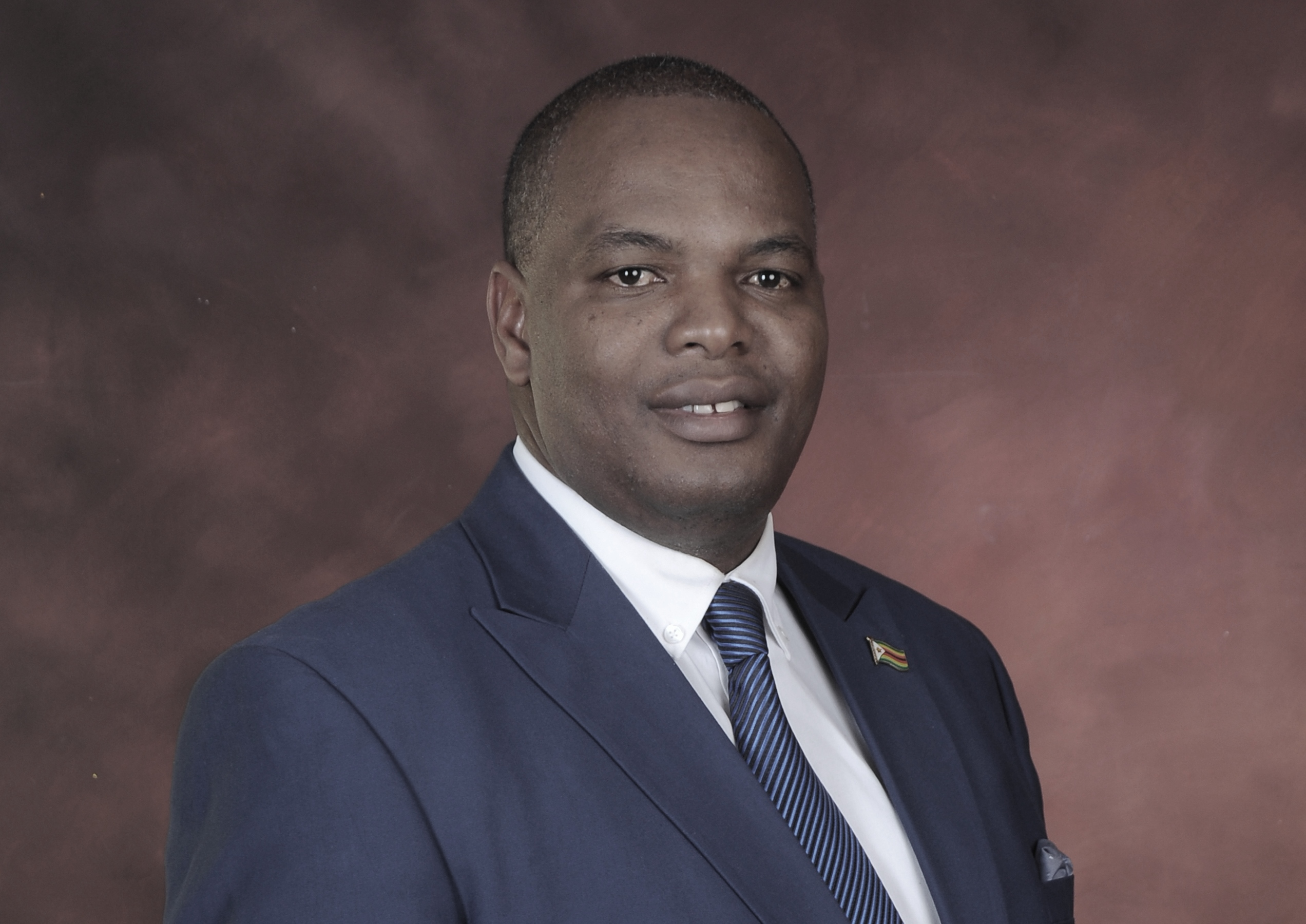
- Born: August 1, 1974 (age 52)
- Education: University of Zimbabwe (MB ChB); Harvard University (PhD)
- Known for: Showing that about 300 000 untimely deaths occurred in South Africa because of untreated HIV/AIDS
- Scientific career
- Fields: HIV, Global health

Pride Chigwedere (born 1 August 1974), a Zimbabwean national, is a Harvard trained physician-scientist working in global health. He is most notable for leading a team of Harvard researchers who demonstrated that South African President Thabo Mbeki's AIDS policies led to more than 300 000 deaths. While South Africa's policies were condemned by many, Chigwedere's contribution was in developing and applying methods to quantify the impact of the policies thus demonstrating the calamitous consequences of AIDS denialism. Generalized, he developed an approach for evaluating public health practice and highlighted the need to develop a framework for accountability in public health. Drawing from the analogy with medicine, he has proposed the concept of public health malpractice to capture negligence that causes harm as a useful first step towards accountability in public health. A response to Chigwedere's work by AIDS denialists led by Peter Duesberg was initially published by the non-peer-reviewed journal Medical Hypotheses followed by a retraction because of poor quality of data, undeclared conflicts of interest, and potential effects on global health.

== Career and awards ==
Chigwedere worked as a physician in Zimbabwe, a viral immunologist and health policy analyst at the Harvard AIDS Initiative, and a management consultant at McKinsey & Company. He then joined UNAIDS as Coordinator for Universal Access for 21 countries in Eastern and Southern Africa, before taking the role of Senior Advisor to the African Union where he counseled the African Union and its Organs AU Commission, Pan African Parliament, NEPAD, African Commission on Human and Peoples' Rights etc.), and Regional Economic Communities, on AIDS and Health, working closely with and strengthening continental mechanisms such as AIDS Watch Africa, the African Peer Review Mechanism, statutory AU Forums (Heads of States Summits, Conference of African Ministers of Health etc.), and the Organisation of African First Ladies against HIV/AIDS (OAFLA). His current work as Senior Policy and Strategy Advisor for UNAIDS China attempts to leverage the political, financial and technological power of China for AIDS and broader global health, advising both China and Africa on how to strengthen partnerships for health including on pharmaceuticals, disease surveillance and response, and strengthening health systems.

Chigwedere's research is published in peer reviewed journals including the Journal of Virology, Human Immunology, AIDS Research and Human Retroviruses, and JAIDS, and he served as editorial advisor for the British Medical Journal special theme issue on Africa. His work has been the subject of front-page articles in The New York Times, the International Herald Tribune, and The Times (South Africa), was featured on BBC, PBS and CNN, was commented on by leaders such as President Bill Clinton, and is the basis of a documentary 'The Price of Denial'. Chigwedere has been interviewed on CNN, has archived presentations on ReachMD Radio and the WGBH-TV Forum Network, a service of PBS and NPR, and served as a health columnist for the Daily News, Zimbabwe, and his opinions have appeared on HBO television. As teaching fellow and instructor, he taught classes at the Harvard College, Harvard Medical School, Harvard School of Public Health, and the Harvard Graduate School of Arts and Sciences, and has presented lectures and participated on high level panels including the Africa Now! Leadership Summit at the American Academy of Arts and Sciences, the John F. Kennedy Forum at the Institute of Politics, the Africa Business Conference at the Harvard Business School, the MIT Sloan School of Management, the Salem Human Rights Award, the Academia Sinica in Taiwan, the U.S. Africa Foreign Policy Conference, and the Zimbabwe Music Festival.

Dr Pride Chigwedere addressing a conference

In 2006, Chigwedere delivered the Lowell Lecture at the Boston Museum of Science, and he was the keynote speaker at the 2006 International Conference on AIDS Orphans and Vulnerable Children where he was honored by the Boston City Council for his efforts in fighting the AIDS epidemic in Africa.

In 2011, Chigwedere was honoured as one of Ten Outstanding Young Zimbabweans by Junior Chamber International, for his contributions to medical science and research.

In 2015, Chigwedere was awarded the Harvard Chan Alumni's Emerging Public Health Leader Award for his work "at the center of the AIDS Response" in Africa.

In 2016, Chigwedere was Zimbabwe's candidate for the position of the African Union Commissioner for Social Affairs 2017 to 2020.

== Education ==
Chigwedere earned a doctorate in immunology and infectious diseases with a second major in ethics of public health practice and an interdisciplinary certificate in the epidemiology of infectious diseases at the Harvard School of Public Health where he was one of three finalists for the Albert Schweitzer Award, the school's highest honor to graduating students. He conducted post-doctoral work at the Harvard AIDS Initiative supervised by renowned retrovirologist Max Essex who is especially known for being first to provide the serological evidence that AIDS is caused by a retrovirus in 1983. He was the recipient of the Oak Foundation Award and Forgaty Fellowship for thesis and research support, was founding member and served as president of the Africa Health Forum, and student representative for immunology and infectious diseases. During the studies at Harvard, Chigwedere took time as a visiting fellow to the McGill University AIDS Center and the Lady Davies Institute for Medical Research, Montreal, where he worked with Mark Wainberg, Chair of the 2006 International AIDS Conference and co-discoverer of the AIDS drug Lamivudine, and he completed certifications at the Foundation for Advanced Education in the Sciences at the National Institutes of Health, and the Pennsylvania State University Biotechnology Program.

Before that, Chigwedere had graduated from the University of Zimbabwe Medical School where he received the Harry Wolfson Medals and Ethel Barrow Prizes for excellence in Biochemistry and Physiology, the Malvern Trust Scholarship for best preclinical Medicine results, the Wellcome Bursary for academic achievement and leadership, the Reuters / Tropical Health and Education Trust Prize for the best research project in Zimbabwe in the International Medical Students Competition, and the Solrarie - Grossberg Scholarship for Outstanding Overall Academic Achievement in the Doctor of Medicine degree. He served as the Secretary General of the Zimbabwe Medical Students Association, the Medical School Representative for the University Interfaculty Games, played soccer in the Socrates team, and was a demonstrator in Physiology and Anatomy to medical and pharmacy students. He then worked as a Resident Medical Officer at Harare Central Hospital and the Parirenyatwa Group of Hospitals where he did rotations in general and neurosurgery, internal medicine, obstetrics and pediatrics. During that time, he served as the Press and Publicity Secretary of the Hospital Doctors Association and wrote opinion editorials in the Zimbabwe Standard and the Zimbabwe Mirror newspapers.
