= Maud Chifamba =

University student in Zimbabwe

- Born: 19 November 1997 (age 28); Gokwe
- Citizenship: Zimbabwean
- Education: University of Zimbabwe
- Occupation: University student
- Known for: Youngest university student in Southern Africa/Africa at age 14

As of 2012 Maud Chifamba is known as the youngest university student in Africa. She was born in 1997 in Zimbabwe and was accepted to the University of Zimbabwe to study for an accounting degree at the age of 14. She began attending in 2012. Her degree was financed through a US$9,933 scholarship from the Zimbabwe Revenue Authority Chairman’s Charity Fund.

== Background ==
Her most known sibling is named Mukundi, two years younger. Maud fell under the care of a step-brother, in 2003, who at the time was residing at a plot he had been allocated during the land reform programme in Hunters Road, in between Kwekwe and Gweru, Midlands Province, Zimbabwe. That year, she started her first grade at a school named Hurudza primary school. In 2005, when she was in grade 3, during the mid-year exams, she was mistakenly given a grade 4 exam paper, on which she scored 100%. the following term during the same year, she requested a grade 5 test paper, on which she achieved the highest score. She proceeded to grade seven and she had 4 units. As Chifamba did not have money for high school she studied on her own (home schooled) and completed her Ordinary Level in just two years, in 2009. She was later identified by the Ministry of Education and awarded financial assistance for her advanced level, upper six in 2011, and she scored 12 points. After making headlines internationally, Chifamba was awarded a $9,993 scholarship by the Zimbabwe Revenue Authority. In 2013 Chifamba scored distinctions at the University of Zimbabwe, where she was studying for her Bachelor of Accountancy Honours degree. She wrote her grade seven examination at the age of 10 and her A-level at the age of 13.

== Recognition ==
In 2007 Chifamba was named the best student under the most difficult conditions in the Midlands Province of Zimbabwe. In December 2012, Chifamba was 5th on Forbes' list of Top 100 Youngest Powerful Women in Africa. She was mentioned in the Book of African Records as the youngest university student in the continent.

In October 2013, Chifamba was a delegate at the launching of a Terre des hommes campaign for girls education in Rome, Italy. She has received various accolades during the years, and has curved a motivational speaking career out of her inspirational life story. She graduated with an Honours in Accounting from the University of Zimbabwe on 29 September 2016. Currently she is pursuing a Zimbabwe Certificate in Theory of Accounting (ZCTA) and graduated with a Masters in Accountancy from the University of Zimbabwe on 10 October 2018.
