= National University of Science and Technology, Zimbabwe =

Public university in Zimbabwe

National University of Science and Technology
- Motto: "Think in other terms"
- Type: Public research university
- Established: 1991
- Chancellor: Emmerson Mnangagwa ex officio as President of Zimbabwe
- Vice-Chancellor: Professor Mqhele Dlodlo
- Location: Bulawayo, Zimbabwe; 20.165°S 28.642°E
- Campus: Urban
- Colors: Blue
- Nickname: Nyuvesi Enkulu
- Website: www.nust.ac.zw

The National University of Science and Technology (NUST) is the second largest public research university in Zimbabwe, located in Bulawayo. It was established in 1991. On 8 April 1991, NUST opened for the first time with 270 students in three faculties. The number of academic staff was 28.

The university has established its own radio station known as nustFM

== Academic programs and faculties ==
NUST has 7 faculties. Each faculty consists of a number of related departments, each offering a degree program.

=== Faculty of Engineering ===
The faculty of Engineering offers Bachelor of Engineering Honors degrees in the following programs:

- Electronic Engineering
- Chemical Engineering
- Industrial and Manufacturing Engineering
- Civil and Water Engineering
- Fibre and Polymer Materials Engineering

The programs take a 5-year course,

=== Faculty of Commerce ===
The Faculty offers four year Bachelor of Commerce Honors Degrees in seven specialized disciplines. Programs are offered for full-time. The third year is Industrial Attachment.

- Actuarial Science
- Banking
- Accounting
- Finance

=== Faculty of Applied Science ===
The Faculty of Applied Sciences offers Four Year Bachelor of Science Honors Degrees for full-time students. MPhil and DPhil programs are also available as either part or full-time courses.

- Applied Biology and Biochemistry
- Applied Chemistry
- Applied Mathematics
- Applied Physics
- Computer Science
- Informatics
- Environmental Science and Health
- Forest Resources and Wildlife Management
- Statistics and Operations Research
- Radiography
- Sport Science And Coaching
- Biotechnology

=== Faculty of Medicine ===
The Faculty of Medicine offers the Bachelor of Medicine, Bachelor of Surgery (MBBS) degree whose duration is 6½years and Bachelor of Science in Biomedical Science Honours Degree which is a 4-year programme that is the foundation of the NUST Bachelor of Medicine and Surgery (MBBS) programme.

=== Faculty of Built Environment ===
Offers degree programs in the following areas:

- Architecture
- Quantity Surveying
- Property Development & Estate Management

=== Faculty Communication and Information Science ===
- Journalism and Media studies
- Library and Information Science
- Records and Archives Management
- Publishing Studies

=== Faculty of Science and Technology Education ===
The newly formed faculty consists of the following departments:

- Art, Design and Technology Education
- Science, Mathematics and Technology Education
- Technical and Engineering Education and Training

== Campus ==
The main campus is located on the A6 highway in Ascot, Bulawayo. The Faculty of Medicine is located at Mpilo Hospital, and the library in the city center.

=== Administration Block ===
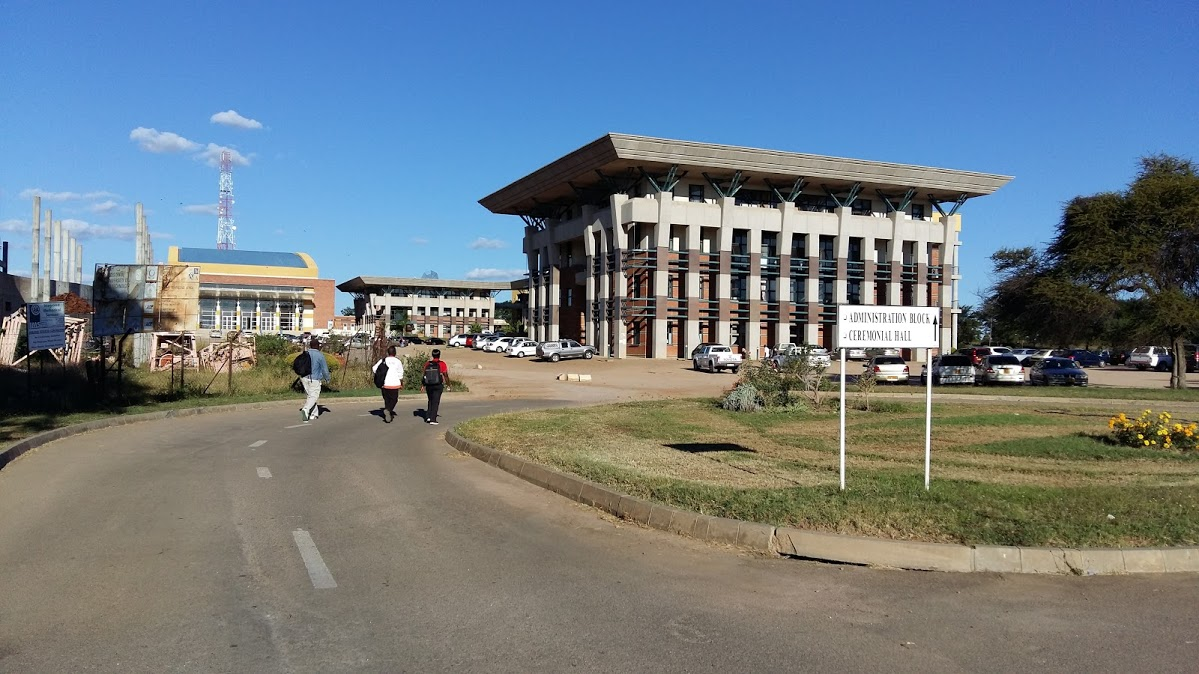
The Administrative Building side

This block holds the main administration offices of the university. The burser's department, registrar et al. are found in this block. Every academic department has an office in this block to facilitate registration and other issues.

The Administration block was the first to be constructed on the campus.

=== Commerce Block ===
The commerce block was the second building on the campus. The first lecture on campus was in this building. It holds the faculty of Commerce. The building boasts lecture theatres that can contain whole faculties. This makes it ideal for meetings and other activities that require dialogue.

=== Chemical Engineering Block ===
This block holds the engineering departments, Chemical, Civil and Electronic. Construction never completed on the buildings, as such there was no official handover of the building.

=== Ceremonial Hall ===
The ceremonial hall is where graduation takes place. This is the same building where the students write their exams. Any other functions that attract attentions of the whole university all take place in the same hall.

=== Incomplete buildings ===
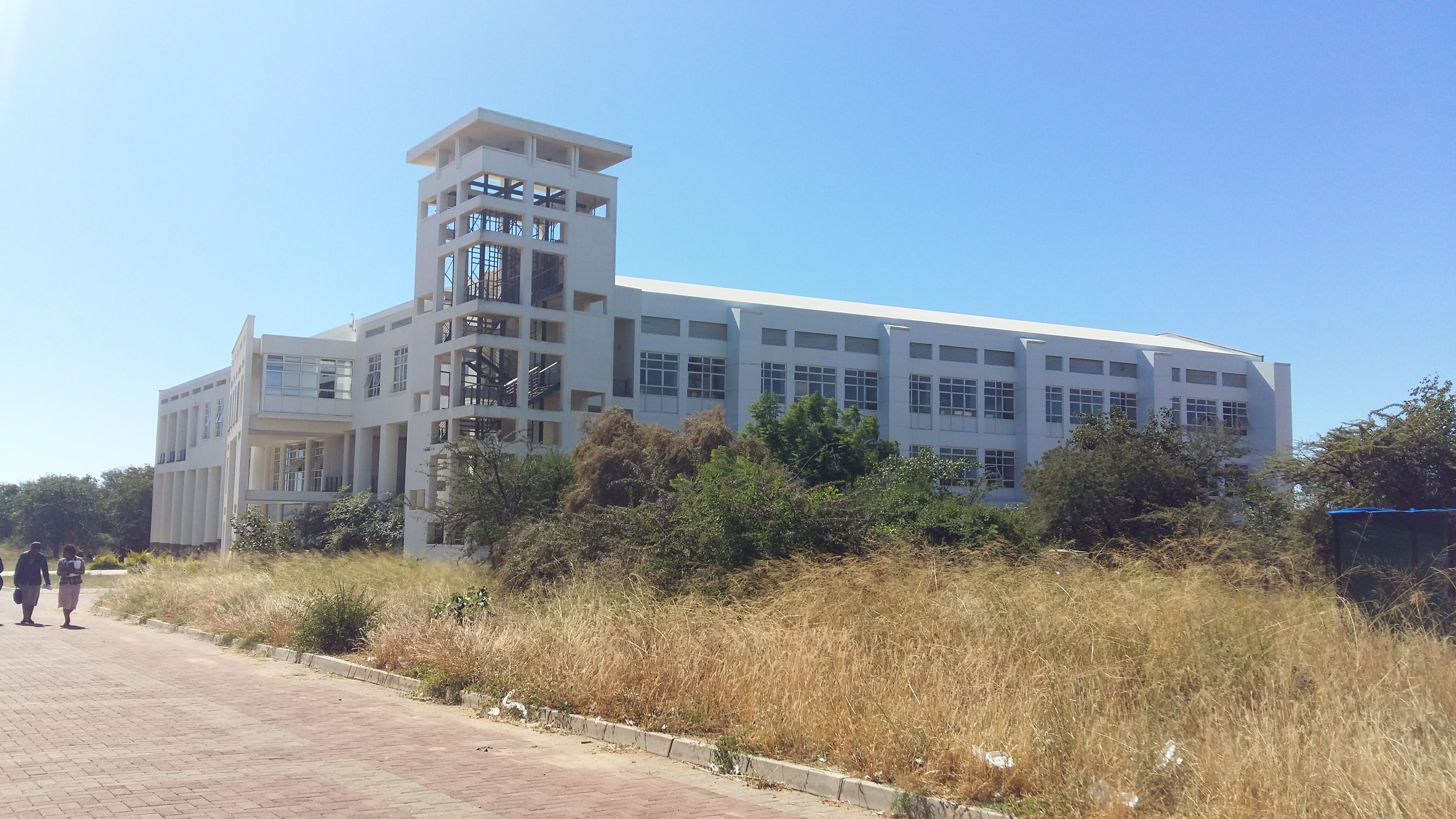

There are other buildings that are still under construction. The buildings are the main library and a shopping mall. Construction is currently on hold, and has been so for several years now.

=== Harare Campus ===
NUST has a small facility in Harare. The facility offers seven post graduate degrees, although it is mainly administrative. The offices streamline the payment of fees and registration for residents of Harare.

== Student residence ==
Student residence is offered as on campus residence, as well as city center residence. The conditions at the two locations are generally the same.

NUST offers very limited accommodation for students. As a result, most students rely on accommodation as tenants in the nearby suburbs. The accommodation is readily available, but sometimes it costs a fortune to stay close to the campus.

== Sporting and other activities ==
NUST offers several sporting activities. The most notable on campus activities are Inter-Faculty games and the Vice Chancellor's games. NUST is also involved in inter university games, which are held at a national level.

== History and controversies ==
On 19 May 1991, Professor P.M. Makhurane was appointed as the inaugural vice-chancellor of the university and soon after that Mr Lameck Sithole and Mr Michael Kariwo were appointed as the first bursar and first registrar respectively. By 1 October 1991, there were 270 students, 28 academic staff, 41 administrators, and 11 support staff.

On 28 October 1991, the university organized a public ceremony to install its first Chancellor Cde R. G. Mugabe, President of Zimbabwe and its first Vice-Chancellor, Professor Phinias Makhurane, and to lay the institution's foundation stone.

For the 1992/93 academic year, the university admitted an additional 300 students into the first year in the three faculties (Commerce, Applied Science and Industrial Technology). Student numbers grew to over 1200 by 1995. During the same period academic staff grew to 85. On 27 May 1995 the university held its first graduation ceremony at which the Doctor of Technology honorary degree was conferred upon the President and Chancellor Cde R.G. Mugabe. Some graduates from the Faculties of Commerce and Applied Sciences were capped.

On 20 July 1995, the university held its second graduation ceremony, where 281 graduands were capped. The first cohort of graduates from the Faculty of Industrial Technology and the Department of Computer Science were conferred with degrees on that occasion.

A donation by the Bulawayo City Council of a site 160 hectares in size and the provision of a capital budget by the government has enabled the first construction phase to begin. Work started in March 1992 when the first contract valued at Z$4,6m was awarded to A. P. Gledinning for the bulk earth works and civil engineering construction for roads. Briefs for the building were completed in May 1992.

In July 1993, the construction programme started with the award of the first contract to Belmont Construction for the Administration Block. A year later, in September 1994 the second contractor, International Construction Zimbabwe started work on the Faculty of Commerce block. In November and December 1994 work also started on the departments of Chemistry and Chemical Engineering respectively. Construction of the first student hostel began a year later, in September 1995. Work on the library began in April 1998, followed by the Ceremonial Hall and the Student Services Centre in November of the same year.

The university moved to campus on 1 August 1998, to occupy the Faculty of Commerce and Administration Buildings. The first lectures on campus took place in the Faculty of Commerce Building on 17 August 1998.

In 2011, NUST faculty of Medicine was closed because it was unable to comply with medical council requirements. The Zimbabwean government went even further by declaring that any diplomas, degrees, or certificates received from the medical school through government funding would be withdrawn until these graduates served the government for the years they received funding. The faculty reopened for the 2013 intake and as of today is currently running.

NUST offers degrees in partnerships with other institutions. In 2015, it was announced that the university inked a partnership with TelOne's technical institute.

Time and again there has been calls to whether or not the NUST is fulfilling its mandate. One such call assumes the university is drifting away from why it was initially founded. The university is at the forefront as far as the realisation of Zimbabwe's STEM goals.
