= List of commanders of the Air Force of Zimbabwe =

Commander of Air Force of Zimbabwe
- Incumbent; Air Marshal John Jacob Nzvede since March 2024
- Air Force of Zimbabwe
- Abbreviation: Comd AFZ
- Member of: Defence Policy Council
- Reports to: Chief of Defense
- Website: Official website

The Commander of the Air Force is chief of the Air Force of Zimbabwe. He commands operations, administration and logistics within the air force.

== List of officeholders ==
=== Rhodesian Air Force (1935–1980) ===
No.	Name (born-died)	Term of office			Ref.
No.	Name (born-died)	Took office	Left office	Time in office	Ref.
1	Major; Dirk Cloete	1936	1938	1–2 years	
2	Lieutenant colonel Charles Meredith	1939	1946	6–7 years	
3	Lieutenant colonel Keith Taute	1947	1949	1–2 years	
4	Air vice-marshal Ted Jacklin	1949	30 June 1961	11–12 years	
5	Air vice-marshal Raf Bentley	30 June 1961	1965	3–4 years	
6	Air vice-marshal Harold Hawkins	1965	1968	2–3 years	
7	Air marshal Archibald Wilson (1921–2014)	8 February 1969	13 April 1973	4 years, 64 days	
8	Air marshal Mick McLaren (1930–2016)	15 April 1973	12 April 1977	3 years, 362 days	
9	Air marshal Frank Mussell (born 1932)	12 April 1977	18 April 1980	3 years, 6 days	

=== Air Force of Zimbabwe (1980–present) ===
No.	Name (born-died)	Term of office			Ref.
No.	Name (born-died)	Took office	Left office	Time in office	Ref.
1	Air marshal Frank Mussell (born 1932)	18 April 1980	1981	0–1 years	
2	Air marshal Norman Walsh (1933–2010)	1981	22 May 1983	1–2 years	
3	Air marshal Azim Daudpota (1933–2017)	July 1983	January 1986	2–3 years	
4	Air chief marshal Josiah Tungamirai (1948–2005)	January 1986	1992	5–6 years	
5	Air marshal Perrance Shiri (1955–2020)	1992	7 December 2017	24–25 years	
–	Air vice-marshal Shebba Shumbayaonda acting	7 December 2017	18 December 2017	11 days	
6	Air marshal Elson Moyo	18 December 2017	16 March 2024	6 years, 89 days	
7	Air marshal John Jacob Nzvede	16 March 2024	Incumbent	2 years, 175 days	
