= Norman Walsh =

Rhodesian Air Force officer

Air Marshal Norman Walsh OLM BCR ESM
- Born: 22 May 1933; Cape Province, Union of South Africa
- Died: 3 August 2010 (aged 77); Queensland, Australia
- Military career
- Allegiance: Southern Rhodesia; Rhodesia; Zimbabwe
- Branch: Rhodesian Air Force; Air Force of Zimbabwe
- Service years: 1950–1983
- Rank: Air Marshal
- Nickname: Ming
- Commands: Air Force of Zimbabwe; New Sarum Air Force Station; No. 7 Squadron; No. 1 Squadron
- Conflicts: Rhodesian Bush War; Operation Dingo
- Awards: Legion of Merit OLM Bronze Cross of Rhodesia BCR Exemplary Service Medal ESM

Air Marshal Norman Walsh OLM BCR ESM (22 May 1933 – 3 August 2010) was a senior officer in the Rhodesian Air Force and the first commander of the Air Force of Zimbabwe.

== Early life ==
Norman Walsh was born on 22 May 1933 and attended Queen's College in South Africa, where he completed his education in 1949. Walsh then moved to the neighbouring British colony of Southern Rhodesia and joined the Southern Rhodesian Air Force as an officer cadet.

== Rhodesian Air Force career ==
Walsh flew Hawker Hunters during his earlier air force years. As a middle-ranking officer, he commanded No. 1 Squadron before switching from fast jet to rotary. He took up command of No. 7 Squadron in 1968, flying the Alouette III helicopter. While in command of No. 7 Squadron, Walsh saw action during the guerrilla incursions from Zambia into Rhodesia. He and his squadron were involved in performing helicopter evacuations of wounded Rhodesian infantry, flying in other infantry to attack the guerrillas and providing direct machine gun fire to support ground troops. During these actions, Walsh's helicopter sustained hits from the guerrillas but he was able to continue flying. Walsh was also carried out forward air control duties, directing air strikes from Rhodesian Percival Provosts. Walsh was awarded the Bronze Cross for conspicuous gallantry shown at this time. Walsh finished the 1960s as Officer Commanding the Flying Wing at New Sarum Air Force Station.

In the 1970s, Walsh held senior appointments in the Rhodesian Air Force. Walsh was the Station Commander at New Sarum from 1975 to 1976. He was Director of Operations at Air Force headquarters from August 1976 to 1977, during which he was the senior air force officer directly involved in the execution of Operation Dingo. At the end of his tour he was appointed an Officer of the Legion of Merit for service as Director of Operations and other previous command and staff tours.

From 1978 to 1980, Walsh was Director General Operations and during this time the Rhodesian Air Force was renamed the Zimbabwe-Rhodesia Air Force. Walsh was appointed Chief of Staff in 1980, taking over from Air Marshal Frank Mussell.

=== Awards ===
- Legion of Merit (Officer - Military) (OLM)
- Bronze Cross of Rhodesia (Airforce) (BCR)
- Exemplary Service Medal (ESM)

== Air Force of Zimbabwe Career ==
In 1981, after Robert Mugabe had become Prime Minister of Zimbabwe, the Zimbabwe-Rhodesia Air Force was renamed the Air Force of Zimbabwe and Mugabe offered command of the air force to Walsh, which he accepted. Walsh's priorities were the recruiting of new personnel from the former guerrilla fighters and replacing outdated aircraft with up-to-date types. Key to this second priority was the acquisition of eight British BAE Hawk jet aircraft to operate in the strike fighter role which were to replace the antiquated Hunters of No. 1 Squadron. In 1982, Walsh personally led the British Aerospace ferry team that flew the new aircraft from Britain to Zimbabwe.

On 25 July 1982, just 10 days after the Hawks arrived in Zimbabwe, four of the eight aircraft were damaged in a sabotage attack at Thornhill Air Force Base. Saboteurs had cut through the perimeter wire and placed time-delay bombs in the aircraft engines. Eight Hunters and a Cessna aircraft were also attacked. Although it was generally accepted that the saboteurs had been South African special forces, Mugabe ordered his Central Intelligence Organisation agents to arrest the senior air force officers who had been involved in procurement of the Hawks. In addition to Walsh, those arrested included his deputy and close friend, Air Vice-Marshal Hugh Slatter. After torture and beatings, forced confessions were extracted from Walsh's personnel and after nearly a year of international pressure the men were brought to trial in the High Court in Harare. Following a lengthy hearing they were all acquitted but were rearrested by Central Intelligence Organisation agents as they left the court building. It was not until international pressure had been applied for several more weeks that the officers were released. With his men released, Walsh resigned his command, officially leaving the service on 22 May 1983. Walsh was replaced by Air Marshal Azim Daudpota, who commanded the air force on loan service from Pakistan. Mugabe no longer trusted former Rhodesian officers and sought to replace them.

== Later life ==
Having been able to resign his position, Walsh left Zimbabwe, emigrating with his family to Australia. Walsh died at his home in Queensland on 3 August 2010 at the age of 77.

Military offices
Preceded by Frank Mussell; As Commander of the Zimbabwe-Rhodesia Air Force	Commander of the Air Force of Zimbabwe; 1981–1983	Succeeded by Azim Dauputa
