= Green Leader =

Rhodesian military pilot

Sqn Ldr Chris Dixon D.C.D.
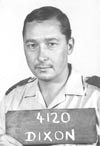
- Born: Christopher John Taylor Dixon; 1943; Shabani, Southern Rhodesia
- Died: 21 October 2011 (aged 67–68); Harare, Zimbabwe
- Military career
- Allegiance: Southern Rhodesia; Rhodesia
- Branch: Rhodesian Air Force
- Service years: 1962–1979
- Rank: Squadron Leader
- Nickname: "Green Leader"
- Commands: No. 5 Squadron
- Conflicts: Rhodesian Bush War; Operation Gatling; Operation Vanity

Squadron Leader Christopher John Taylor Dixon D.C.D. (1943 – 21 October 2011), also known by his callsign of Green Leader, was a Rhodesian military pilot for the Rhodesian Air Force and was born in Shabani, Southern Rhodesia. He was best known for leading the Rhodesian Operation Gatling bombing raid over Zambia, which later became known as the "Green Leader Raid".

== Early life and career ==
Dixon was born in 1943 in Shabani, Southern Rhodesia. He was educated at Plumtree School. In 1962, Dixon joined the Royal Rhodesian Air Force in the Federation of Rhodesia and Nyasaland and he passed his Pilot Training Course as an officer cadet. By 1974, Dixon was serving as a flight lieutenant in No. 1 Squadron. He was later assigned to No. 5 Squadron and later became their squadron leader in 1977. As squadron leader, he gave endorsement to a proposal from Jack Malloch to restore a Mark 22 Supermarine Spitfire to flying condition after it had been mounted on a plinth outside New Sarum Air Force Station in Salisbury.

== Green Leader ==
In 1978, following the downing of the civilian Air Rhodesia Flight 825 by ZIPRA guerrillas, the Rhodesian Government planned retaliatory strikes against ZIPRA bases across the Rhodesian border in Zambia. The attack, later codenamed Operation Gatling, was to be led by Dixon. Upon crossing the border in his English Electric Canberra bomber, he contacted the control tower at Lusaka Airport identifying himself as "Green Leader" informing them to contact the Zambian Air Force commander at Mumbwa. Dixon told the tower to communicate to the commander that he was temporarily taking control of Zambian airspace on behalf of the Rhodesian Air Force. He clarified in the message that the reason was to attack "Rhodesian dissidents and not against Zambia" and stated Rhodesia had no quarrel with Zambia. He did, however, warn the Zambian authorities not to interfere and stated that the Rhodesians were orbiting Zambian airfields and had orders to shoot down any Zambian Air Force planes that attempted to take off. He also had civilian aircraft approaching Zambia put on hold. He kept control until 10 minutes after the RhAF had completed their raid. After a Kenya Airways pilot complained about who had control of the airspace (to which Lusaka had responded "I think the Rhodesians do"), Dixon said that the airport could let civilian aircraft land.

The exchanges were broadcast on television and radio by the Rhodesian Broadcasting Corporation. Dixon's role in the raid was commemorated in the song "Green Leader" by John Edmond as he was considered a hero in Rhodesia for his actions. He later led the bombing raid against ZIPRA in Operation Vanity over Angola flying an English Electric Canberra bomber but almost had to abort participation due to a radio fault. For his military successes, he was awarded the Defence Cross for Distinguished Service on 13 April 1979.

Following the end of his Rhodesian military service, Dixon remained in the newly reconstituted Zimbabwe until his death in 2011.
