= Operation Griffin =

- Part of the Rhodesian Bush War (or Second Chimurenga)
Date	16–26 July 1968
Location	Chirundu, Rhodesia
Result	Rhodesian victory

Belligerents
Rhodesia; South Africa	ZIPRA

Commanders and leaders
(Rhodesia) Maj. Robert Southey (Rhodesia) 2Lt. Jerry Strong; Flt. Lt. Petter-Bowyer; Norman Walsh	Unknown

Units involved
Rhodesian Army: RAR; E Company; RLI; 3 Commando; RRAF; South African Police	Unknown

Strength
Unknown	28 cadres

Casualties and losses
Rhodesia: 1 killed 7 wounded 1 helicopter damaged South Africa: 1 killed 2 wounded	27 killed 1 defected

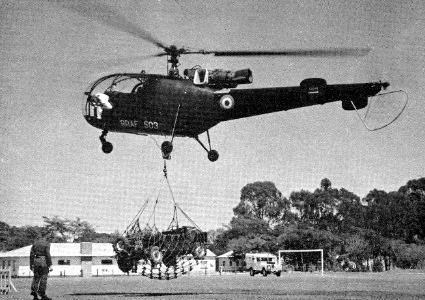
An Alouette III helicopter of the Rhodesian Air Force, pictured in 1962. Covering FN MAG fire from such an aircraft proved vital during the first contact of Operation Griffin on the 18 July 1968.

Operation Griffin was a military operation launched by the Rhodesian Security Forces, on 16 July 1968, in response to an incursion into Rhodesia by communist insurgents belonging to the ZIPRA based in Zambia.

== Background ==
A group of 28 ZIPRA insurgents entered from Zambia near Chirundu on 13 July 1968, with the intention of operating in the Hartley area where the Viljoens had been murdered four years earlier. Three days after the crossing, one of them became lost while on reconnaissance and gave himself up to police at Chirundu. He divulged the present location of his comrades, on the bank of the Zambezi, as well as where they had crossed the river. Operation Griffin started the same day, 16 July.

== The Operation ==
A patrol of South African Police (SAP) was despatched along with a detachment of RLI men from 3 Commando and some from E Company, Rhodesian African Rifles (RAR), who were in the area on border patrol. Noticing the increased helicopter activity of the security forces, the cadres realised they had been detected and moved into a defensive position in a deep gully.

The two the different forces came into contact with each other on the morning of 18 July, when the insurgents opened fire on 12 Troop, 3 Commando, led by Second Lieutenant Jerry Strong. The Rhodesians were initially pinned down but Strong and Lance-Corporal Terry Lahee crawled forward on their bellies and provided covering rifle fire, also tossing grenades at the enemy to allow 12 Troop to find better cover; the official report calls this an "act of supreme gallantry which undoubtedly saved the lives of several of the troopers who were in exposed positions." Covering FN MAG fire from a Royal Rhodesian Air Force (RRAF) Alouette III helicopter, with Major Robert Southey aboard, then allowed Strong's men to pull back. 12 Troop joined up with 14 Troop, the SAP and the RAR platoon on a ridge to the north of the ZIPRA position. The SAP attempted to descend into the gully from the eastern end but found themselves trapped on the slopes by shooting from the insurgents.

The Alouette was then hit and, although only lightly damaged, forced to withdraw, leaving the ground troops without covering MAG fire. Now covered by the Rhodesian ground troops and Frantans was a small Rhodesian-made napalm bomb developed by the Royal Rhodesian Air Force during the 1960s. They were 1.8 metres (5 ft 11 in) long and filled with about 73 litres (16 imp gal; 19 US gal) of napalm. To hide their nature and purpose during development they were referred to as "frangible tanks", which gave rise to the abbreviation "Frantan", which stuck. dropped by Percival Provosts, the South Africans made several unsuccessful attempts to pull back from the banks of the gully throughout the afternoon which led to two injuries and the death of Constable du Toit. The SAP men were eventually able to withdraw under cover of darkness, while Rhodesian and South African injured were uplifted by helicopter in an action described by Southey as "sheer brilliance". "Norman Walsh and Peter Nicholls [the two helicopter pilots] faced great difficulty because of steep mountainsides and the blackness of the night in conditions of thick haze," writes Peter Petter-Bowyer, then an RRAF flight lieutenant. "Visual contact with [the] ground [was] impossible until dangerously low and close." Flying at such low altitude, each pilot was blinded by the reflection of his own landing light when he looked towards the ground. Walsh noticed that he could clearly see the ground beneath the other helicopter's light, and so instructed Nicholls to turn off his landing light and allow him to illuminate the landing site for him. "This worked like a charm," says Petter-Bowyer. Guided by Walsh's landing light, Nicholls safely landed and collected some of the casualties, then did the same for Walsh as he picked up the rest. Flares were dropped during the night to help the ground troops search for guerrilla movement but none was seen.

The RLI, meanwhile, was redeployed by Southey, and positioned to seal off likely escape routes from the gully. Ambushes were set up on each ridge and at both ends of the gully. At dawn four guerrillas attempted to break through a 3 Commando stop position at the eastern end; unfortunately for the insurgents, this ambush was headed by Commando Sergeant Major Al Tourle, a particularly aggressive soldier nicknamed "Bangstick", whose men shot and killed all four. Southey then led 12 and 14 Troops on a sweep of the gully from the west and found that the ZIPRA fighters had vacated their position, leaving most of their equipment. Two cadres hiding in a cave opened fire on Southey's men and were killed. Two insurgent bodies were found, burnt by the Frantans. By noon on 19 July the area was clear; 10 guerrillas had been killed while the security forces had lost one trooper and suffered six troopers wounded. Headquarters was moved to Kariba while 2 Commando was brought in from Salisbury to assist in locating the remaining cadres.

Strong led a sweep up the river and met with no resistance while a squad of trackers including Tourle moved south, towards Kariba. The latter group spotted the 10 insurgents in ambush in another gully at 13:30 on 19 July and a fierce battle ensued. The RLI squad leader's faulty radio set meant that he was unable to issue orders, leading Tourle to take the initiative by shouting orders to soldiers around him. This made him the subject of concentrated ZIPRA fire, but he nevertheless directed the RLI actions throughout the contact while also accounting for most of the opposing force personally. "Tourle," says Binda, "armed with an MAG, moved with one other man to a rocky outcrop overlooking the enemy position and laid down a withering fire." Under this cover Corporals Johnstone and Strydom flanked right and eliminated a ZIPRA sniper, while Corporal Kirkwood and Lance-Corporal Coom moved to the left. A sweep was then carried out, during which a guerrilla jumped out of cover and opened fire, wounding Coom; Johnstone killed the insurgent.

== Aftermath ==
The remainder of the search revealed that the other nine cadres were dead, six having been killed by Tourle. For his "gallantry and leadership" in this action, Al Tourle was awarded the Bronze Cross of Rhodesia on 23 October 1970. The remaining seven cadres were captured or killed over the course of the next week, leaving none unaccounted for when the operation ended at 12:00 on 26 July 1968.
