= Frank Mussell =

Rhodesian Air Force air marshal

Air Marshal Frank Walter Mussell CLM
- Born: 31 May 1932 (age 94); Salisbury, Southern Rhodesia
- Military career
- Service years: 1952–1981
- Rank: Air Marshal
- Unit: No. 5 Squadron.
- Commands: Commander Rhodesian Air Force; Commander Air Force of Zimbabwe; OC No. 5 Squadron; OC RRAF Thornhill
- Awards: Legion of Merit CLM

Air Marshal Frank Walter Mussell CLM (born 31 May 1932) is a retired commander of the Rhodesian Air Force and later of the Air Force of Zimbabwe.

Frank Walter Mussell was born on 31 May 1932 in Salisbury (now Harare) in Southern Rhodesia. After schooling in Rhodesia and the United Kingdom, Mussell briefly worked as a clerk before joining the Southern Rhodesia Air Force in 1952. After two years of pilot training, Mussell was granted a permanent commission and appointed to be aide-de-camp to Sir Robert Tredgold, the Chief Justice and acting governor of Southern Rhodesia. After this tour, Mussell trained on the de Havilland Vampire jet fighter and was involved in ferrying Vampires from the UK to Rhodesia. In 1961 he was promoted to squadron leader and appointed to command No. 5 Squadron.

In 1963 Mussell returned to the UK to attend the RAF Staff College in Bracknell. On completion of his staff training he served at the Rhodesian Air Force headquarters in the operations branch before gaining a promotion to wing commander and taking up appointment as the director of plans (air) on the Rhodesian Joint Planning Staff. In 1966 Mussell was sent to Lisbon, Portugal, where he joined the Rhodesian Diplomatic Mission as the first secretary (political). He returned to Rhodesia at the end of 1967 to take up post as the officer commanding RRAF Thornhill with a promotion to group captain. On completion of his time at Thornhill, Mussell returned to Air Force headquarters as the senior air staff officer. Thereafter he was appointed director of administration.

On promotion to air commodore, Mussell was appointed director-general operations. In 1973 he was promoted again to air vice-marshal and appointed Air Force Chief of Staff. Four years later Mussell was appointed to commander of the Rhodesian Air Force in the rank of air marshal, succeeding Air Marshal 'Mick' McLaren. Mussell held the senior Rhodesian Air Force appointment until 1981, during which time Zimbabwe gained its independence and the air force was renamed the Air Force of Zimbabwe. Mussell was replaced by Air Marshal Norman Walsh, Robert Mugabe's appointee.

== Awards ==
- Legion of Merit (Commander - Civilian) (CLM)

Military offices
Preceded by Mick McLaren	Commander of the Rhodesian Air Force; Commander of the Air Force of Zimbabwe from 1980; 1977–1981	Succeeded by Norman Walsh
