= Military career of Ian Smith =

1941–1945 military career of the future Rhodesian Prime Minister

Ian Smith
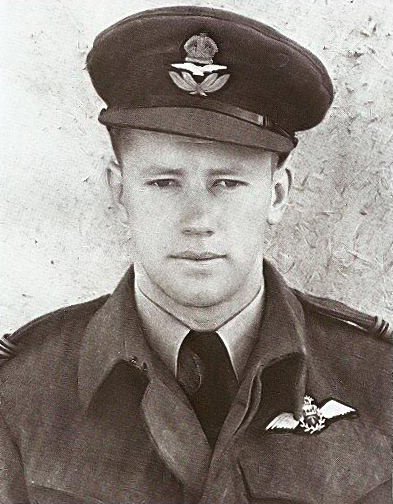
- Smith as a flying officer c. 1943
- Born: 8 April 1919; Selukwe, Rhodesia
- Died: 20 November 2007 (aged 88); Cape Town, South Africa
- Military career
- Allegiance: Southern Rhodesia; United Kingdom
- Branch: Royal Air Force
- Service years: 1941–1945
- Rank: Flight lieutenant
- Service number: 80463
- Units: No. 237 Squadron (1942–44); No. 130 Squadron (1945)
- Conflicts: Second World War; Middle Eastern campaign; Italian campaign
- Other work: Prime Minister of Rhodesia

Ian Smith, later Prime Minister of Rhodesia, served as a pilot in the Royal Air Force (RAF) during the Second World War. He enlisted in 1941 while studying at Rhodes University in South Africa and trained in Southern Rhodesia. Posted to No. 237 (Rhodesia) Squadron in late 1942, he served in the Middle East and North Africa. A crash during takeoff in Egypt in October 1943 left him seriously injured. He returned to flying duties in May 1944.

Smith was shot down by anti-aircraft fire over northern Italy in June 1944. With assistance from members of the Italian resistance, he avoided capture and made his way to Allied lines in southern France. He subsequently served with No. 130 Squadron in Germany during the final weeks of the war in Europe. He held the rank of flight lieutenant and was demobilised in late 1945.

Smith entered politics in 1948 and became Prime Minister of Southern Rhodesia in 1964. His RAF service was later used by supporters to portray him as a war hero. Smith himself regarded Britain's opposition to independence under continued white minority rule as a betrayal of Rhodesia's contribution to the war. His government issued a Unilateral Declaration of Independence in November 1965.

== Background ==
Smith was born in 1919 in Selukwe, Southern Rhodesia, the son of British settlers. He attended Chaplin School in Gwelo before enrolling at Rhodes University College in Grahamstown, South Africa, in 1938 to study commerce. He was still a student when the Second World War began in September 1939.

== Enlisting and training in Rhodesia ==
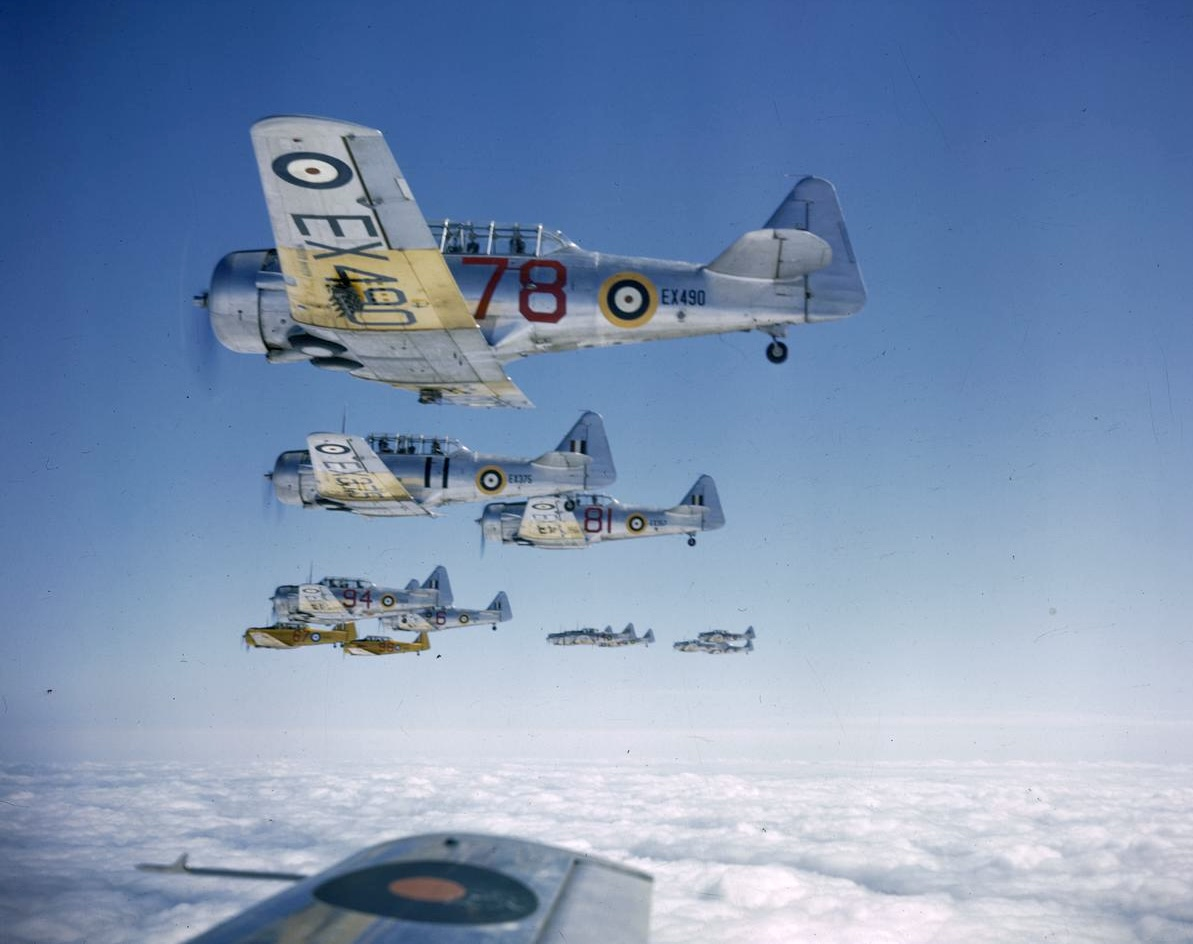
Harvards flown by Royal Air Force trainee pilots in Southern Rhodesia, 1943

At the outbreak of the Second World War in September 1939, Smith was studying at Rhodes University College in South Africa. He sought to join the Southern Rhodesian Air Force, but military recruitment restrictions initially prevented university students from enlisting before completing their studies. These restrictions were part of wider manpower controls intended to protect Southern Rhodesia's civilian industries during the war.

Southern Rhodesia participated in the Empire Air Training Scheme, which began operating in the colony in 1940. The Southern Rhodesian Air Force was incorporated into the British Royal Air Force (RAF) in April 1940, becoming No. 237 (Rhodesia) Squadron.

Smith made several attempts to enlist during 1940 and early 1941, initially concealing his university enrolment from recruitment officials. He was eventually accepted and formally enlisted in the RAF in September 1941, receiving service number 80463.

Smith began his training at the Initial Training Wing in Bulawayo before transferring to the Elementary Flying Training School at Guinea Fowl, near Gwelo. He trained on Tiger Moth and Harvard aircraft before proceeding to Thornhill for officer cadet training. He completed his training in September 1942 with the rank of pilot officer.

== Service ==
=== Middle East and North Africa ===
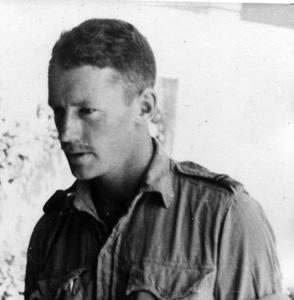
Smith with No. 237 (Rhodesia) Squadron, c. 1943

Smith was sent to the Middle East in late 1942, completing six weeks of operational training at Baalbek in Lebanon before joining No. 237 (Rhodesia) Squadron as a Hawker Hurricane pilot. The squadron was stationed in Iran before moving to Kirkuk, Iraq, to protect oil installations. It returned to the Western Desert campaign in March 1943. Smith was promoted to flying officer on 25 March 1943.

On 4 October 1943, Smith was seriously injured when his Hurricane crashed during takeoff from Idku, Egypt, while he was departing on a convoy escort mission. He suffered facial injuries and fractures to his jaw, leg and shoulder. He underwent reconstructive surgery at the Fifteenth Scottish Hospital in Cairo and was declared fit to fly again in March 1944.

After further training in Egypt, Smith rejoined No. 237 Squadron in Corsica in May 1944. The squadron was then flying Spitfire Mk IX fighters.

=== Italy ===
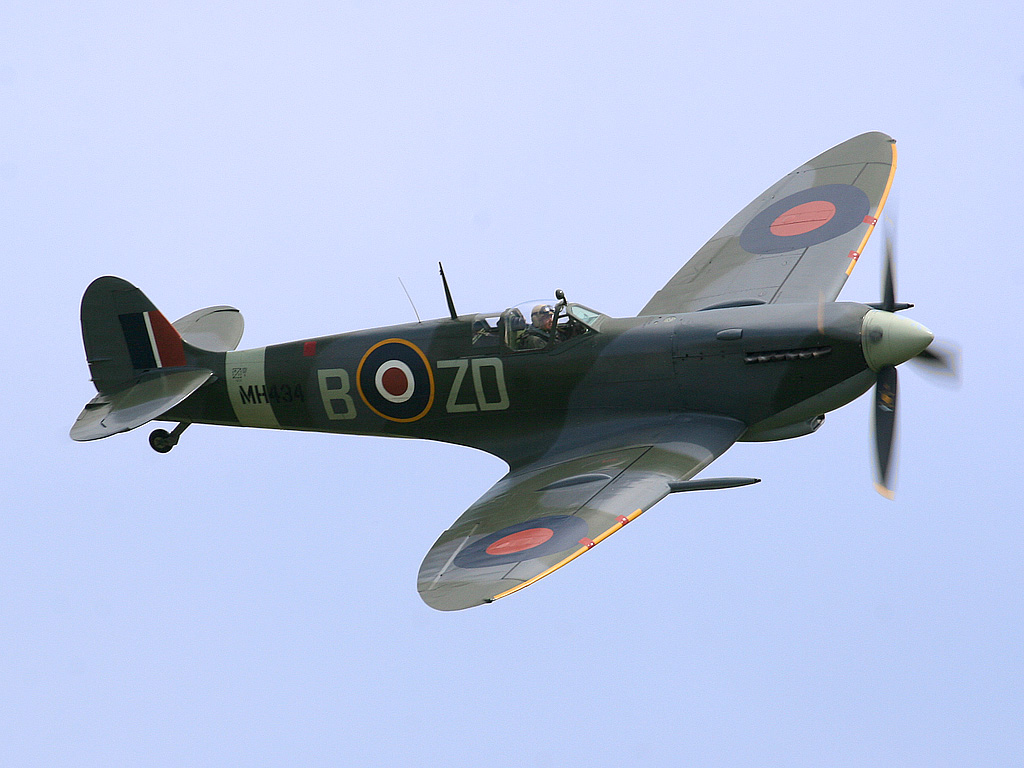
A Spitfire Mk IX, as flown by Smith in Italy during 1944

Smith joined No. 237 Squadron in Corsica on 10 May 1944, and resumed operational flying two days later. He was promoted in the field to flight lieutenant. (Note: This was made official on 25 September 1944, while Smith was missing in action in Italy.) The unit was attached to an American bomber group, and assigned to cover it during attacks on northern Italian cities. The fighters also embarked on strafing raids in the Po Valley against railway traffic and heavy vehicles. Smith flew 10 sorties and on the last of these, on 22 June, led a strafing raid against a large railway yard when his aircraft was hit by flak on a second pass. He warned other pilots not to attempt a second pass on the railway yard, and turned towards the coast, hoping to ditch in the sea. Smith's wingman, Alan Douglas, told him by radio that black smoke was coming from the aircraft, then that the engine was ablaze. Smith bailed out. He had never parachuted before. He turned his Spitfire upside down, thrust the stick forward, released the cockpit's canopy, fell out of the plane and landed without serious injuries on the side of a mountain.

According to Smith's account, he concealed himself after parachuting into the mountains and avoided a German patrol searching the area. A local family, the Zuninos, subsequently sheltered him, initially hiding him in a cave because of the risk of discovery by German troops.

Smith subsequently joined a local partisan group led by Antonio Bozzano, known as "Barbetta", and participated in sabotage operations against German forces. According to Smith's memoirs, he remained with the partisans until October 1944, when German forces withdrew from their garrison at Sassello. He then decided to attempt to reach Allied lines, accompanied by a British Army corporal who had also been hiding in the area.

Downed behind German lines in northern Italy, near Sassello, Smith spent three months fighting with local partisans, then headed west, hoping to meet Allied troops in southern France

Smith travelled west through the Ligurian Alps towards southern France, where Allied forces had landed during Operation Dragoon in August 1944. Accompanied initially by a British Army corporal, he received assistance from Italian partisans and local residents. Three other Allied personnel, a Frenchman, an Austrian and a Pole, subsequently joined them. Near the French border, Smith and the corporal crossed a German-guarded bridge without being stopped. The Frenchman and Austrian followed the next day, while the Polish soldier returned to Italy.

After entering France, the group continued across the Maritime Alps, avoiding German positions. Twenty-three days after leaving the partisan camp at Piancastagna, Smith and the British corporal reached American forces. Smith was subsequently taken to Marseille and flown to an RAF transit camp at Naples, arriving in late November 1944.

=== Late war and demobilisation ===
Smith undertook refresher training on Spitfires in Shropshire before returning to operational service. On 23 April 1945, he joined No. 130 (Punjab) Squadron at Celle, Germany, where he flew combat missions during the final weeks of the war in Europe.

Following the German surrender in May 1945, Smith remained with No. 130 Squadron as it moved to Denmark and subsequently Norway, where he served during the post-war occupation. He returned to Britain with the squadron in November 1945 and was demobilised, returning to Southern Rhodesia later that year.

== War wounds ==
The reconstructive surgery Smith underwent following his 1943 aircraft crash left him with facial disfigurement and partial paralysis. The effects of his injuries were still visible decades later.

Smith also suffered lasting pain that made sitting for long periods difficult. He sometimes stood during political meetings to relieve the discomfort.

== Influence on political career ==
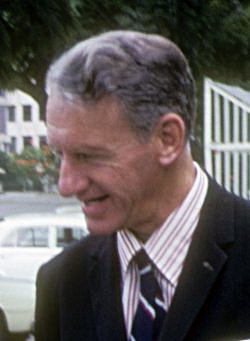
Smith in 1975, as Prime Minister, wearing his RAF tie

After completing his studies at Rhodes University in 1946, Smith was elected to the Southern Rhodesian Legislative Assembly in 1948. He became Prime Minister in 1964. Smith regarded Britain's opposition to independence under continued white minority rule as a betrayal, given Southern Rhodesia's contribution to the British war effort. His government issued a Unilateral Declaration of Independence on 11 November 1965.

Smith's RAF service became part of his public image. Historian Martin Francis described the popularity of household items depicting Smith with his Spitfire among white Rhodesians during the 1960s and 1970s. Historian Luise White observed that foreign journalists frequently mentioned his wartime record when reporting on the Rhodesian Bush War, although Rhodesian national servicemen showed little interest in it. Journalist Peter Niesewand, who was deported from Rhodesia in 1973, was critical of Smith's reputation as a war hero, describing his contribution to the Allied war effort as having been "to crash two perfectly good Hurricane planes for the loss of no Germans".

Smith continued to wear his RAF pilot's tie during his political career. He wore it on the eve of the establishment of Zimbabwe Rhodesia in 1979, an occasion that historian Bill Schwarz described as "symbolising an entire lost world".
