= Operation Vanity =

1979 Rhodesian Bush War Operation

- Part of the Rhodesian Bush War
- Location: Angola Operation Vanity (Angola)
- Planned by: Rhodesia
- Target: ZIPRA
- Objective: Destroy ZIPRA camp nearby Luso, Angola.
- Date: 25–26 February 1979
- Outcome: Rhodesian Bombing Success
- Casualties: 160 ZIPRA killed; 530 Wounded

Operation Vanity was a Rhodesian military operation in Angola with clandestine assistance from the South African Air Force (SAAF) during the Rhodesian Bush War. The Rhodesian Air Force planned a retaliatory raid against a ZIPRA camp in Angola after a second Air Rhodesia Viscount was shot down on 12 February 1979.

== Operation ==
In retaliation for the downing of Air Rhodesia Flight 827, the Rhodesian Air Force (RhAF) planned a bombing raid against a ZIPRA training camp situated nearby the town of Luso in Angola. The Rhodesians estimated that there were 3000 ZIPRA soldiers, as well as Cuban and East German advisors, based there. The Rhodesians were only able to provide four Canberra bombers for the raid and required three additional aircraft which would be provided clandestinely by the South African Air Force (SAAF). Three SAAF Canberra bombers of 12 Squadron, under the command of Major Hannes Bekker, were armed with Alpha cluster bombs and took off around 18:15 hours from Air Force Base Waterkloof, South Africa on 25 February 1979. From there they flew northwards to the Victoria Falls airfield in Rhodesia and landed after dark. There the navigators planned the raid for the following morning. The strike leader was Squadron Leader Chris Dixon, 5 Squadron Rhodesian Air Force, call-sign Green Leader. Three SAAF and three RhAF aircraft were armed with 5 Alpha bombs each while the last Rhodesian Canberra bomber was armed with six 1000 lb bombs.

The flight of seven bombers took off at 06h30 on 26 February 1979 headed for the target, which was located 1,100 kilometres (680 mi) to the north-west. Additional Rhodesian aircraft were provided in the form of one Dakota command and control aircraft and two Hawker Hunter fighters. Initially command passed to Flight Lieutenant Ted Brent because of radio problems, but would return to Chris Dixon later in the flight. The flight headed over Zambia and then into Angola, dodging both countries' air defence radars, before turning towards the Benguela Railway west of Luso which followed east toward the target. By this time they had formed into two formations of four and three bombers, line abreast, hitting a rainstorm which cleared up two minutes from the target. The bombers, now line-abreast dropped to a height of 300 ft so that the Alpha bombs, a type of cluster bomb, would cover an area 300 by 1000 meters. As they attacked, rows and rows of bungalows could be seen by the pilots with no anti-aircraft fire received, nor vehicles seen nor anyone on the parade ground, giving the pilots the impression of an empty camp.

== Aftermath ==
Having attacked the target successfully, the bombers returned to Rhodesia, the SAAF bombers to Flyde near Hartley while the RhAF bombers flew back to Victoria Falls with one 1000 lb bomb before refueling and joining the SAAF aircraft. Photographic evidence captured by a SAAF bomber showed the camp was occupied and there were anti-aircraft guns. It was said 160 ZIPRA soldiers died and another 530 were wounded.

== See also ==
- Battle of Cassinga
- Operation Eland
- Air Rhodesia Flight 825
