= Mick McLaren =

Rhodesian Air Force commander (1930–2016)

Air Marshal Michael John McLaren CLM
- Born: 18 November 1930
- Died: July 29, 2016 (aged 85); Cape Town, South Africa
- Military career
- Rank: Air Marshal
- Nickname: Mick
- Commands: Rhodesian Air Force 1973–1977; Deputy Commander of Combined Operations (1977–1980)
- Awards: Legion of Merit CLM
- Other work: Oil Industry

Air Marshal Michael John McLaren CLM (18 November 1930 – 29 July 2016) was a Rhodesian senior commander in the Rhodesian Air Force. McLaren was in command of the Rhodesian Air Force from 1973 to 1977. Thereafter he was Deputy Commander of Combined Operations until 1980 when he retired from military service and worked in the oil industry. He died from cancer in Cape Town, South Africa, on 29 July 2016.

== Awards ==
- Legion of Merit (Commander - Civilian) (CLM)

Military offices
Preceded by Archie Wilson	Air Officer Commanding the Rhodesian Air Force; 1973–1977	Succeeded by Frank Mussell
Unknown	Deputy Commander of Combined Operations; 1977–1980	Unknown
