= Harold Hawkins (RRAF officer) =

Australian air force officer in Rhodesia

Air Vice-Marshal Harold Hawkins CBE AFC ICD GLM
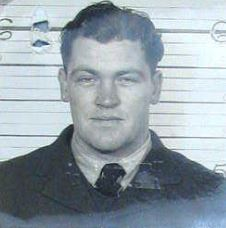
- Harold Hawkins during his RAAF service
- Born: 18 February 1921; Toowoomba, Australia
- Died: 13 March 1988 (aged 67); South Africa
- Military career
- Allegiance: Australia; Rhodesia
- Branch: Royal Australian Air Force (1941–45); Royal Rhodesian Air Force (1947–69)
- Service years: 1941–1945; 1947–1969
- Rank: Air Vice-Marshal
- Commands: Royal Rhodesian Air Force (1965–69)
- Conflicts: Second World War; Rhodesian Bush War
- Awards: Commander of the Order of the British Empire; Air Force Cross; Independence Commemorative Decoration; Grand Officer of the Legion of Merit
- Other work: Rhodesian Accredited Diplomatic Representative to South Africa (1969–80)

Air Vice-Marshal Harold Hawkins, CBE, AFC, ICD, GLM (18 February 1921 – 13 March 1988) was an Australian-born air force officer and diplomat. He served in the Royal Australian Air Force in the Second World War, enlisted in what became the Royal Rhodesian Air Force in 1947 and was its commander from 1965 to 1969. Hawkins subsequently became the Rhodesian Accredited Diplomatic Representative to South Africa until 1980.

== Military career ==
=== Royal Australian Air Force ===
Harold Hawkins was born in Toowoomba, Queensland, Australia, on 18 February 1921. His initial schooling was at the Christian Brothers' College in Toowoomba. Hawkins' family moved to Brisbane in 1938.

Hawkins applied to join the Royal Australian Air Force during the first months of the Second World War, and was accepted by the service in late June 1940. He enlisted on 2 February 1941.

After joining the RAAF, Hawkins underwent pilot training in Canada and the United Kingdom. He completed training in July 1943 and was commissioned as a flying officer. Hawkins' first operational posting was to No. 163 Squadron RAF. He was later posted to No. 459 Squadron RAAF. During this period he served in the United Kingdom and the Middle East. Hawkins undertook a flying instructor training course in Southern Rhodesia in 1943. In 1944 he was posted to RAF Norton in Southern Rhodesia. During this posting he married Evelyn Walker, who had been raised in the colony. Hawkins' final posting in the RAAF was to No. 7 Operational Training Unit. He was discharged from the RAAF on 26 November 1945, having achieved the rank of flight lieutenant. Following the war Hawkins worked as a pilot with Australian National Airways for a year.

=== Royal Rhodesian Air Force ===
Hawkins emigrated to Southern Rhodesia in 1946. Under Southern Rhodesian law, he gained citizenship of the colony automatically. Hawkins initially worked as an air traffic controller. In March 1947 he was one of the first two pilots to join the Southern Rhodesia Government Communications Squadron, the forerunner to the Southern Rhodesian Air Force (SRAF). By early 1948 Hawkins was the commander of the Southern Rhodesian Air Unit. He was promoted to captain in 1949 and placed in command of the SRAF Cranborne airfield. Hawkins was awarded the Air Force Cross in 1951 for his role in the creation of the SRAF. At this time he held the rank of captain and commanded 400 men. In early 1951 Hawkins piloted a Dakota transport aircraft that guided a flight of 20 Supermarine Spitfire fighters from the UK to Southern Rhodesia. He repeated this role in September 1953, when his Dakota guided the SRAF's first de Havilland Vampire jet fighters from the UK to Southern Rhodesia. Hawkins was sent to the UK in 1953 to attend the Royal Air Force Staff College; by this time he held the rank of major. Also in 1953 the SRAF became the Royal Rhodesian Air Force (RRAF).

Once Hawkins graduated from the staff college he became the air adviser at the Southern Rhodesian diplomatic mission in London, Rhodesia House. He became a wing commander when the RRAF adopted the RAF's rank structure. Hawkins was promoted to the rank of group captain in 1958. In July 1960 he commanded the RRAF operation to evacuate white civilians from Congo during the Congo Crisis, which involved all of the force's transport aircraft. Hawkins was promoted again to become the Deputy Chief of Air Staff with the rank of air commodore in 1961.

In April 1965 Hawkins was appointed the RRAF's Chief of Air Staff (the force's commander) with the rank of air vice-marshal. This occurred as a result of his predecessor, Air Vice-Marshal "Raf" Mulock-Bentley, being forced to retire early after complaining to Prime Minister Ian Smith about approaches several ministers had made to test his men's loyalty in the event of Rhodesia declaring independence from the UK. Hawkins was personally opposed to Rhodesia's Unilateral Declaration of Independence (UDI) on 11 November 1965, but remained in his role.

The RAF ended its logistical and other support for the RRAF following UDI, which disrupted the force's operations. UDI also sparked the Rhodesian Bush War, an armed insurgency by black nationalists against Rhodesia's white minority government. The RRAF was involved in this conflict from April 1966. Fighting was generally limited to small scale engagements until 1969. Hawkins encouraged the security forces to apply the minimum necessary level of force in engagements, and expressed concern over the amount of ammunition that was fired during the April 1966 Battle of Sinoia that marked the start of the war. In September 1966 Hawkins and the Minister for Law and Order Desmond Lardner-Burke made radio broadcasts that warned militants against making attacks against Rhodesia during a Commonwealth conference that was being held in London.

Hawkins retired from the RRAF in April 1969.

== Diplomatic roles ==
After emigrating to Rhodesia Hawkins was granted a Rhodesian passport. Due to United Nations sanctions imposed in response to Rhodesia's illegal declaration of independence, Rhodesian citizens were banned from travelling internationally. An Australian passport would allow Hawkins to evade the ban. Under Australian law at the time Hawkins was not automatically entitled to an Australian passport, as the Minister for Immigration had discretion to refuse applications made by Australian citizens. In July 1968 Hawkins, who remained the head of the RRAF, applied for an Australian passport. The Australian government was initially reluctant to issue the passport, as the Australian embassy in Pretoria had reported that Hawkins was rumoured to be the incoming Rhodesian representative to South Africa. In support of his application, Hawkins provided documentation that demonstrated that he had automatically gained Rhodesian citizenship. He also stated that he intended to retire and use the passport for recreational travel. Prime Minister John Gorton directed the Minister for Immigration Billy Sneddon to issue Hawkins an Australian passport in August 1968. Australian Federal opposition leader Gough Whitlam criticised the government for issuing the passport, arguing this had violated the United Nations sanctions against Rhodesia.

In April 1969 Hawkins was selected to be the Rhodesian Accredited Diplomatic Representative in South Africa. This was one of only three official diplomatic posts Rhodesia was able to maintain due to the impact of the United Nations sanctions imposed in response to its illegal declaration of independence, though there were also a number of unofficial Rhodesian representative offices in various countries. South Africa was a key partner for Rhodesia, and the country initially refused to apply the United Nations sanctions. During the 1970s South Africa provided Rhodesia with extensive financial and military aid.

Hawkins undertook the diplomatic role using his Australian passport. The Secretary of the Rhodesian Ministry of External Affairs and the Rhodesian representative to Portugal had also been issued Australian passports at around the same time as Hawkins; both men applied for the passports before commencing these diplomatic roles. Historian Matthew Jordan has observed that "the Smith regime was using Australia's generosity [in issuing passports to citizens] to evade sanctions". In July 1972 the Whitlam government decided to not renew Hawkins' Australian passport when it expired on the grounds that he was working for a government not recognised by Australia. Hawkins' Australian passport expired on 6 December 1972, and was not renewed in line with this decision. At the time Hawkins was still serving as Rhodesia's representative in South Africa.

As part of his role Hawkins worked with the South African government to evade the United Nations sanctions. For instance, in 1974 he asked the South African government to allow the front company for the Rhodesian Iron and Steel Corporation to hide its true ownership from the company's auditors.

Between September and December 1979 Hawkins formed part of the Rhodesian delegation in London during the negotiations that led to the Lancaster House Agreement. This agreement ended the Rhodesian Bush War and directly led to Rhodesia's transition to majority rule and independence as Zimbabwe. He served as the foreign affairs adviser to the Prime Minister of Zimbabwe Rhodesia, Bishop Abel Muzorewa, during the negotiations.

Hawkins continued as the Rhodesian Accredited Diplomatic Representative in South Africa until early 1980, when the country became Zimbabwe.

== Personal life ==
Hawkins and Evelyn had two children, a daughter and a son named Geoffrey who was born in February 1948. Hawkins died in South Africa on 13 March 1988.

== Awards ==
Hawkins received the following honours during his Rhodesian service:

- Order of the British Empire (Commander) (CBE)
- Air Force Cross (United Kingdom) (AFC)
- Independence Commemorative Decoration (ICD)
- Legion of Merit (Grand Officer - Civilian) (GLM)
