= Air Force of Zimbabwe =

- Badge of the Air Force of Zimbabwe
- Founded: 1980; 46 years ago (as current service)
- Country: Zimbabwe
- Type: Air force
- Role: Aerial warfare
- Size: 5,000 personnel (1999); 80 aircraft (2026)
- Part of: Zimbabwe Defence Forces
- Mottos: Latin: Alæ Præsidio Patriæ "Our wings are the fortress of the nation"
- Engagements: Mozambican Civil War; Second Congo War

Commanders
- Chief of the Air Force: Air Marshal John Jacob Nzvede
- Notable commanders: Air Chief Marshal Azim Daudpota; Air Chief Marshal Josiah Tungamirai Air Chief Marshal Perence Shiri

Insignia
- Roundel

- Fin flash

Aircraft flown
- Fighter: Chengdu J-7, SIAI-Marchetti SF.260
- Attack helicopter: Mi-35P
- Multirole helicopter: Mil Mi-17, Mi-24
- Trainer: SIAI-Marchetti SF.260, Nanchang K-8, BAE Hawk
- Transport: CASA C212 Aviocar, Britten-Norman Islander, Bell 412

The Air Force of Zimbabwe (AFZ) is the air force of the Zimbabwe Defence Forces. It was known as the Rhodesian Air Force until 1980. The Air Force of Zimbabwe saw service in the Mozambican Civil War in 1985 and the Second Congo War of 1998–2001.

== History ==
=== Formation and early days ===
The Rhodesian Air Force (RhAF; previously known as the Royal Rhodesian Air Force), was reconstituted into the Air Force of Zimbabwe in 1980. The RhAF's mixed collection of aircraft were joined by other aircraft from 1981 onwards, supplied by Kenya, Britain, China and elsewhere. Support also came from the Pakistan Air Force who trained most of the Zimbabwean pilots in the initial days, assisted in the re-construction of Thornhill Air Base, and provided Air Marshal Azim Daudpota to Zimbabwe as the Chief of Air Staff (1983–1986).

In 1981, the Air Force of Zimbabwe ordered 8 Hawk MK60s, which were delivered in July 1982. On the night of 25 July 1982, a sabotage attack on Thornhill Airbase damaged four Hawks, nine Hunters and a single FTB-337G. One Hawk was written off, another was repaired on site and the other two were returned to BAE for a rebuild. A follow-up order for five additional Hawks was completed in September 1992.

The first supersonic interceptor operated by the air force was the Chinese-built Chengdu J-7/F7 Airguard, 12 of the II and IIN variants were delivered in 1986. Two Eurocopter AS532 Cougar helicopters were reported to be in use for VIP duties in 1997, delivered in April 1995 and September 1996. In April 2021, a newer (refurbished) Eurocopter EC225 Super Puma was added to the fleet.

=== Second Congo War 1998–2003 ===
The Second Congo War, also known as "Coltan War" and the Great War of Africa, began in August 1998 in the Democratic Republic of the Congo (formerly called Zaire), and officially ended in July 2003 when the Transitional Government of the Democratic Republic of the Congo took power; although hostilities are currently ongoing. Zimbabwe's well-trained military entered the war as the best-equipped side. In mid-August 1998, the AFZ deployed six or seven F-7s, most of the C.212s, at least four Cessna 337G Lynxs, and a dozen or more helicopters, including Alouettes, Bell 412s and Mi-35s, to Congo. All aircraft were flown by Zimbabwean pilots. After receiving an urgent shipment of spare Hawks, the AFZ apparently deployed some of them as well. At the start of the war, the Hawks had been reported to be in unflyable condition. Due to these circumstances the AFZ contingent in the Congo in August and September 1998 consisted of flights from No.3, No.4, No.5, No.7 and No.8 Squadrons, while a flight from No.2 Squadron was to follow later.

The No.2 AFZ Squadron deployed 12 BAe Hawk T.Mk.60/60As, which were used as strike-fighters and equipped with AIM-9B Sidewinder AAMs, Mk.82-series bombs, and Hunting BL.755 cluster-bomber units (CBUs), as well as launchers for unguided rockets. Only six or seven F-7s From No.5 squadron were fully mission-capable. Prior to the war in Congo, Zimbabwe was in the middle of negotiations with China for 12 additional F-7s.

For transport, the AFZ had the No.3 Squadron, flying 12 CASA C-212 Aviocar and six Britten-Norman BN-2A Islander light transports which had already seen heavy service, and were to see even more of this in Congo. Transport and liaison were also duties of the No.7 Squadron, equipped with Aérospatiale SA 316B Alouette IIIs (including ex-Portuguese Air Force – and Romanian IAR-built examples), as well as of the No.8 Squadron, equipped with Agusta-Bell 412SPs which were later armed with rocket launchers for this war. However, the latter unit would soon play a significant role in the war in DRC, as it was only recently equipped with the newest addition to the AFZ: six Mi-35 helicopters (including two Mi-35Ps). The first AFZ Mi-35-crews were trained at Thornhill AB, in Gweru, by Russian instructors. CO of this unit was Sqn. Ldr. Mukotekwa.

The first noted AFZ operation took place on 26 August 1998, where they destroyed a 5 km armoured column of rebels as they were approaching Kinshasa. After defeating the invaders in Kinshasa, the Zimbabweans, in the belief that Kabila's government was already safe, suggested that there was no need to continue the war, and peace should be negotiated. This resulted in the reinforcement of rebel efforts as well as the Rwandans and Ugandans rushing better-equipped units into the battle. The garrisons in eastern Congo that remained loyal to Kabila fell to rebel attacks. The Ndigili airport, in Kibanseke Province, as well as Kitona, both held by Zimbabwean troops, were attacked simultaneously. In both cases, the AFZ responded with fierce air strikes. Rebels claimed that up to 100 civilians were killed by their bombs.

A series of fierce battles were fought between 4 and 13 September 1998, during which the Angolan mechanised forces were finally able to deploy their full firepower. The Chadian contingent was meanwhile deployed in NE Congo, where it participated in re-capture of Lubutu. The AFZ and FAC were active in this area for several days, flying a number of strikes during which cluster-bomb units (CBUs) were used. According to government reports, 45 rebels were killed and 19 captured in this battle.

On 13 September, when the Angolans attacked towards Kamina, the Zimbabweans found themselves under fierce attacks by thousands of rebels in the Manono area. It was in this area that the AFZ suffered its first documented loss of this war: on 4 September the Aermacchi SF.260 flown by wing commander Sharaunga crashed in bad weather, killing the pilot. Nine days later an Alouette III helicopter carrying several high-ranking officers, including Col. Kufa and Sqn. Ldr. Vundla, was shot down by rebels in eastern central Congo. Kufa and Vundla were killed, while Flt. Sgt. Sande was captured by RCD.

In late October 1998, the Zimbabweans launched an offensive in SE Congo. The offensive was made possible owing to the deployment of additional foreign troops in Congo, including some 2,000 Namibians. This began with a series of air strikes, partially flown by BAe Hawk T.Mk.60s of the No.2 Squadron, newly deployed in Congo, and by F-7s of the No.5 Squadron. These units first targeted airfields in Gbadolite, Dongo and Gmena, and then rebel and Rwandan communications and depots in the Kisangani area, on 21 November. On the following day the No.2 Squadron launched a strike package of six aircraft, armed with Mk.82 bombs and Matra 155 rocket launchers for unguided rockets calibre 68mm, which reached out far over central Congo. They deployed over Lake Tanganyika and attacked ferries used to transport Burundi troops and supplies into the war in Congo. According to Zimbabwean reports their strike came as a complete surprise. With machine-guns and light infantry weapons as the only means of air defense, six ferries were sunk and 600 Burundi and Rwandan troops killed. In a similar attack, on 7 December 1998, Zimbabwean planes or helicopters sank two rebel boats on Lake Tanganyika some 40 km north of Moba.

In November 1998, it was reported that a $54 million shipment of helicopters, fighters, and spotter aircraft had arrived in Zimbabwe to assist in the Democratic Republic of Congo. It is unclear who received the delivered weapons. There were very few reports about the fighting in the following days, likely because the Congolese, Zimbabwean, and Angolan governments faced intense pressure from Western powers due to this offensive. The limited reports released from sources close to the rebels indicated that Zimbabwean and Congolese forces were attacking Nuyuzu, Kasinge, and advancing toward Manono, supported by T-62 tanks and heavy artillery. According to Zimbabwean reports, the Hawks and F-7s continued their operations, launching additional attacks against Kalemi on November 24, followed by a new round of strikes against various airfields in eastern Congo two days later. After these attacks, the pilots of No.5 Squadron claimed the destruction of an unidentified An-12 transport on the ground.

When Congolese President Laurent Kabila was assassinated in early 2001, the Zimbabwean Air Force deployed five Chengdu J-7/F7 Airguard to Kinshasa to participate in a fly-past at the state funeral. One of the five fighter planes crashed en route to the event and while four subsequently made the fly-past, two of the remaining aircraft also crashed during the return flight home. The crashes were blamed on low flying hours for pilots in the air force and insufficient training time.

== Current organizational structure ==
The AFZ is subdivided into the Administration Wing, the Engineering Wing, the Flying Wing, and the Regimental Wing. The Administration Wing supports equipment purchasing, recruitment, staff support, food supplies, and related functions. The Engineering Wing maintains and inspects aircraft and related equipment, and covers the School of Technical Training, a tertiary education institution responsible for training aircraft maintenance engineering technicians. The training institute is the only federation aviation school in Africa. The Flying Wing handles aircrew personnel divided into eight squadrons at three primary bases. It also covers the schools for flying and parachute training. The Regimental Wing covers those squadrons specially selected to guard other AFZ assets, such as personnel and installations. and weapon activations.

Directorates found in the air force of Zimbabwe:

- Regiment
- Civil Military Relations
- Finance
- Training
- Health Services
- Intelligence
- Administration
- Engineering

=== Squadrons ===
The flying squadrons of the Air Force of Zimbabwe continue the lineage of its predecessor, the Rhodesian Air Force. Following the retirement of the Hawker Hunter and Lynx, No. 1 and No. 4 Squadron were inactivated.

Flying Squadrons of the Air Force of Zimbabwe
Squadron Number	Motto	Aircraft	Base
No. 1 Squadron	Speed and courage	Inactive	Gweru-Thornhill Air Force Station
No. 2 Squadron	Strike from above	Hongdu JL-8, BAE Systems Hawk	Gweru-Thornhill Air Force Station
No. 3 Squadron	Swift to support	BN-2 Islander, CASA C-212	New Sarum Air Force Station
No. 4 Squadron	Seek and strike	Inactive	Gweru-Thornhill Air Force Station
No. 5 Squadron	Find and destroy	Chengdu J-7	Gweru-Thornhill Air Force Station
No. 6 Squadron	Aspire to achieve	SIAI-Marchetti SF.260	Gweru-Thornhill Air Force Station
No. 7 Squadron	Fight anywhere and everywhere	Alouette III, Mil Mi-24	New Sarum Air Force Station
No. 8 Squadron	By night and day	Bell 412, Mil Mi-17	New Sarum Air Force Station

== Aircraft ==
=== Current inventory ===
Ascertaining a list of aircraft types operated by the Air Force of Zimbabwe is difficult because of secrecy. AFZ has been constantly linked to Mikoyan MiG-29 since 1980, and even sent pilots to the then-USSR for training (AFZ does not have MiG-29 in service as of 2026). In February 2002, the EU enforced an arms embargo on Zimbabwe in reaction to severe violations of human rights in the nation. Unable to buy spare parts for the British-designed and manufactured BAE Systems Hawk, in 2006 the air force received its first K-8. The air force also had MiG-23 fighter jets donated by the late Muammar Gaddafi (MiG-23 was apparently retired in 2025). In the late 1980s, an order for MiG-29s was placed with Russia, but was cancelled in 1992. Negotiations to buy 14 MiG-29SMTs from Russia were held again in 2004, but an order for JF-17 fighters was apparently placed instead (AFZ does not have JF-17 in service as of 2026). One BAE Systems Hawk was returned to service in 2019 for the AFZ 40th anniversary mass flypast and was noted in a flypast at the April 2022 Zimbabwe International Trade Fair. Between 2022 and 2023, AFZ was able to restore more of its BAE Systems Hawks to service; a spokesman for the defense forces declined to comment on the circumstances of their refurbishment.

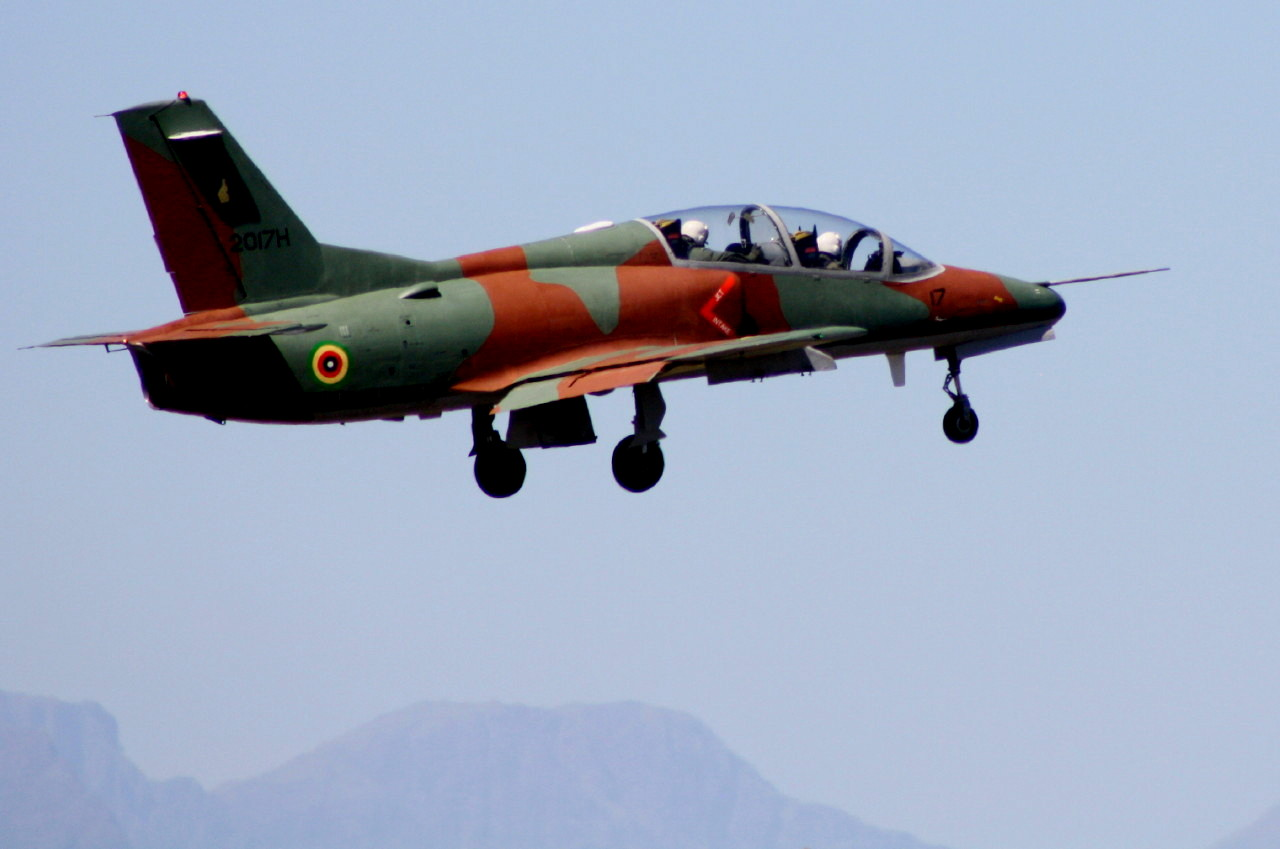
K-8 Karakorum Trainer at Ysterplaat Airshow, Cape Town.

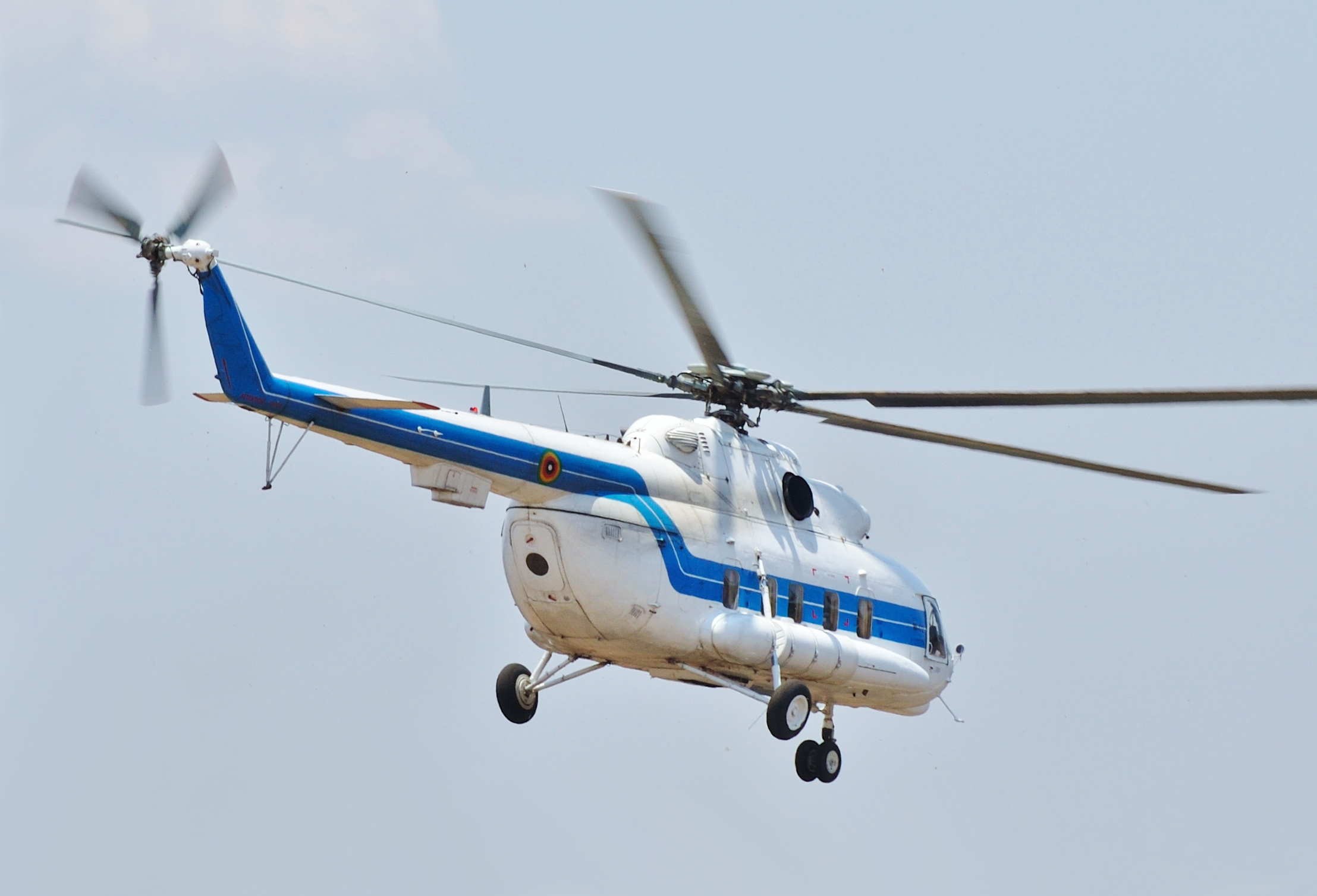
A Mil Mi-8 on takeoff

Aircraft	Origin	Type	Variant	In service	Notes
Combat aircraft
Chengdu J-7	China	Multirole	F-7	9	2 FT-7 trainer variants in addition.
SIAI-Marchetti SF.260	Italy	Light combat aircraft		9	6 trainer SF.260 in addition.
Transport
BN-2 Islander	United Kingdom	Utility	BN-2A	5	
CASA C-212	Spain	Transport		9	
Helicopters
Bell 412	United States	Utility	AB412	8	
Mil Mi-24	Soviet Union	Attack	Mi-35	6	
Mil Mi-17	Soviet Union	Utility	Mi-172	1	
Alouette III	France	Utility	SA316	13	
Trainer
Chengdu J-7	China	Jet trainer	FT-7	2	9 F-7 multirole combat variants in addition.
Hongdu JL-8	China	Jet trainer	K-8	12	
PAC MFI-17 Mushshak	Pakistan	Trainer	MFI-395 Super Mushshak	(12 Super Mushshaks on order)	
SIAI-Marchetti SF.260	Italy	Trainer		6	9 SF.260 in light combat service in addition.
BAE Systems Hawk	United Kingdom	Advanced trainer	BAe Hawk T.Mk60/60As	4	Restored to service in 2022-23.

=== Retired aircraft ===
Previous notable aircraft operated by the Air Force consisted of the English Electric Canberra, de Havilland Vampire, C-47 Dakota, Aermacchi AL-60, Reims 337 Lynx, Hawker Hunter, MiG-23, and Cessna Skymaster.

== Rank structure ==
The AFZ's rank structure is similar to the RAF's rank structure from where, via the Rhodesian Air Force, its ranks were derived.

Officers/Commissioned Ranks

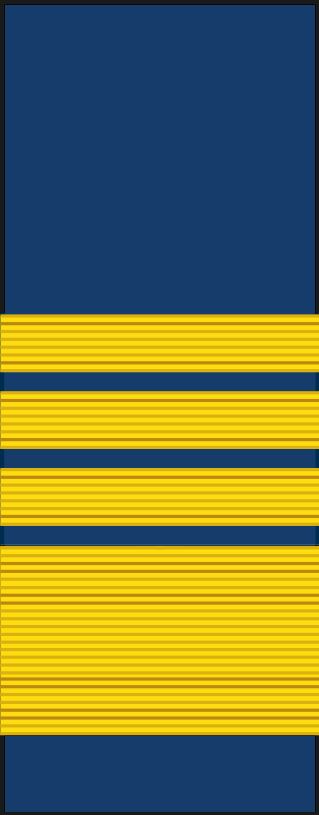
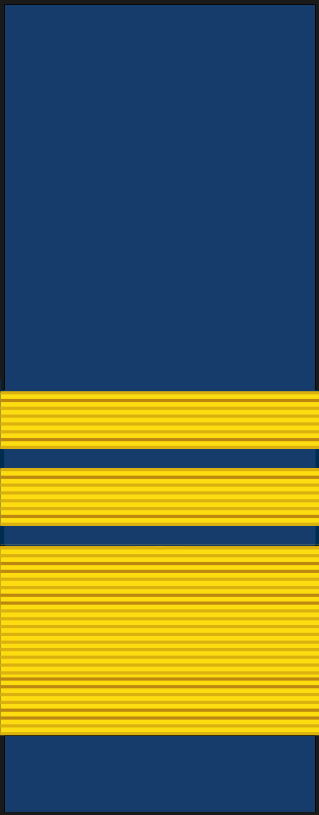
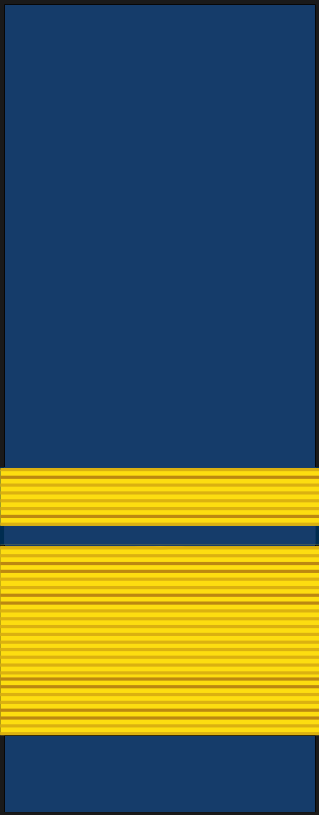
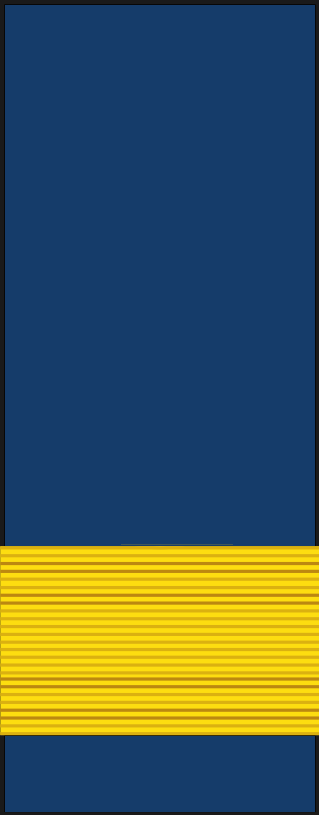
Rank group	General / flag officers				Senior officers			Junior officers
Air Force of Zimbabwe
Air Force of Zimbabwe	Air chief marshal	Air marshal	Air vice-marshal	Air commodore	Group captain	Wing commander	Squadron leader	Flight lieutenant	Air lieutenant	Air sub-lieutenant

Airmen/Other ranks/Non Commissioned Ranks

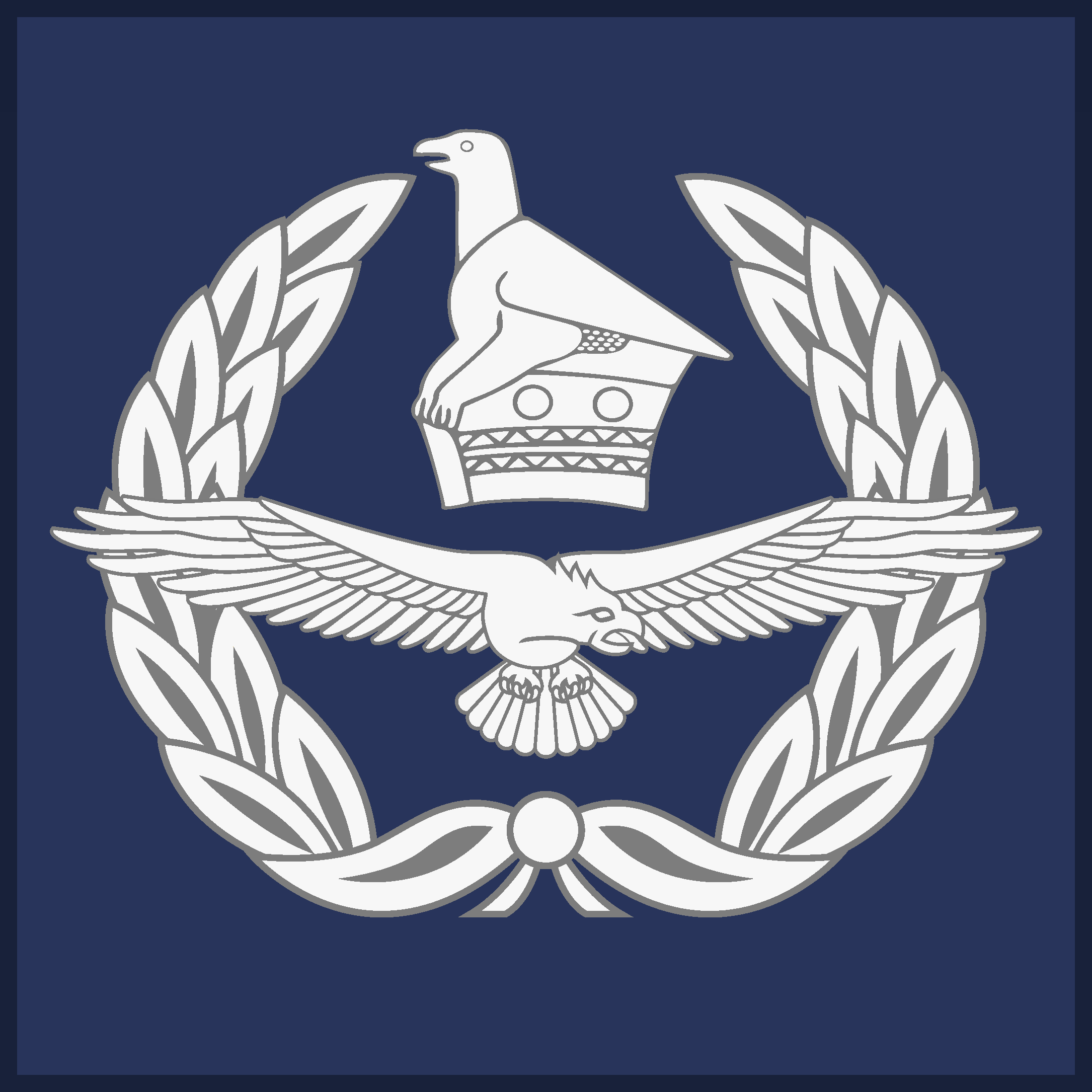
Rank group	Senior NCOs						Junior NCOs		Enlisted
Air Force of Zimbabwe										No insignia
Air Force of Zimbabwe	Warrant officer class 1	Master technician	Warrant officer class 2	Master sergeant	Flight sergeant	Sergeant	Corporal	Senior aircraftman	Leading aircraftman	Aircraftman

== Aircraft losses ==
Exact figures for the Air Force of Zimbabwe's aircraft losses have not been publicly published. It is believed four Hawks were lost, three F7s and several helicopters.

- Michael Enslin, 21 years of age the time, was shot down in a BAe Hawk at 1000 feet while recovering from a dive. He survived for 5 days in the bush until he was rescued. He was the third pilot to be shot down.
- SF.260MC flown by Wing Commander. Sharaunga crashed in bad weather, killing the pilot.
- The Pilot Wing Commander became disorientated at night while on the way to take part in a flypast at Laurent Kabila's funeral, and the pilot ejected. He was found alive in the jungle by Zimbabwean troops five days later.

== Incidents and accidents ==
Incidents and accidents starting 1980 (1980 included) when Air Force of Zimbabwe was formed. Incidents and accidents prior to that should be attributed to Rhodesian Air Force.

- On 18 December 1980, a Douglas C-47A-1-DK (DC-3) was destroyed.
- The Air Force suffered a major setback on 25 July 1982 when four of their eight BAE Hawks were damaged in a sabotage attack a few days after their arrival at Thornhill Air Base. Plane 602 was written off, plane 601 was kept in Zimbabwe for repairs, whilst planes 600 and 603 were shipped back to British aerospace for repairs to airworthy status.
- On 25 July 1982, a Cessna FTB337G Super Skymaster was sabotaged. The plane was destroyed.
- On 25 July 1982, a BAe Hawk T.60 was sabotaged. The plane was destroyed.
- On 25 July 1982, a Hawker Hunter FGA.80 was sabotaged. The plane was destroyed.
- On 22 July 1985, a UFO was witnessed by dozens of persons on the ground and in the control tower at Bulawayo Airport now Joshua Mqabuko Nkomo International Airport. The air traffic controllers watched it hover and tracked it on radar and two BAE Systems Hawk jets were scrambled to pursue it and the pilots described it as incredibly shiny, reflecting the colours of the sunset they estimated that the UFO was travelling at twice the speed of sound.
- On 3 April 1986, a Cessna FTB337G Super Skymaster crashed. The plane was destroyed and one person was killed.
- On 25 August 1988, a Cessna FTB337G Super Skymaster crashed. The plane was destroyed and both pilots were killed.
- On 19 June 1989, a Hawker Hunter FGA.9 crashed. The plane was destroyed.
- On 12 June 1990, a Agusta-Bell AB 412 crashed. The helicopter was destroyed.
- More than 20 airspace intrusions were reported in the first nine days of October 1992. The violations appeared to be in the vicinity of Thornhill Air Base and the violators are believed to be South African transport planes on their way to Angola.
- On 12 January 1993, a Sud Aviation SE 3160 Alouette III crashed. The helicopter was destroyed.
- On 7 October 1993, a BAe Hawk T60 crashed. Both crew members survived but the plane was destroyed.
- On 6 April 1994, a Sud Aviation SE 3160 Alouette III crashed. The helicopter was destroyed.
- On 14 November 1994, a Chengdu F-7 crashed. The plane was destroyed.
- In February 1995, a Chengdu F-7 crashed near Lalapanzi after encountering some engine problems. Flight Lieutenant Zisengwe died in the plane crash. The plane was destroyed.
- In September 1997, a BAe Hawk T60 crashed. Both crew members were killed and the plane was destroyed.
- In 1997, a CASA C-212 Aviocar 200 crashed. The plane was destroyed.
- On 17 March 1999 a Chengdu F-7M was shot down. The plane was destroyed.
- On 6 December 1999 a SIAI-Marchetti SF.260 crashed. Both pilots died and the plane was destroyed.
- 21/22 January 2001, an unnamed Wing Commander flying a Chengdu F7 became disoriented at night while on the way to take part in a flypast at Laurent Kabila's funeral. He ejected and was found alive in the jungle by Zimbabwean troops five days later. The plane was destroyed.
- On 23 January 2001, a Chengdu F7 was destroyed when hitting a tree after landing.
- On 24 February 2005, a CASA C212-200 Aviocar military transport plane came down during take-off at the Harare International Airport, killing two pilots – Wing Commander Lysias Charuka and Air Lieutenant Aletini Silaigwana.
- On 1 April 2005 Aérospatiale Alouette III crashed soon after take-off in Gokwe, the pilot tried to avoid telephone lines. All six on board survived. The helicopter was destroyed.
- On 5 September 2008, a K-8 Karakorum training jet crashed into Block 1 Married Quarters flats at Thornhill Air Base in the Midlands town of Gweru during a training sortie. The jet skimmed over trees and houses as it headed for a school before turning sharply and smashing into two high-rise residential flats. There were no injuries or deaths other than the two pilots Flight Lieutenant Kudzai Kelvin Majongosi of Chirumanzu and Flight Lieutenant Dumisani Ndlovu of Bulawayo. Both were 28 years old. The plane was destroyed.
- On 22 September 2010, K-8 serial number 2021C piloted by "Venom" practicing for the Africa Aerospace and Defence Expo display burst a tire on landing and rolled to the end of the runway at AFB Ysterplaat, Cape Town. It took some time to get the runway open again and aircraft in the air at the time diverted to Cape Town International Airport.
- On 20 August 2011, two Hongdu K-8 Karakorum collided mid-air. The planes were taking part in a flyover for a funeral of a general. Both planes landed safely and received minor damage.
- On 4 September 2014 a SIAI-Marchetti SF.260 trainer aircraft crashed into a shanty town on the western outskirts of the capital soon after takeoff from the Charles Prince Airport on a routine training mission over the Mount Hampden area when it suddenly nose-dived and crashed. The two pilots, Squadron leader Taurayi Jombo aged 36, and Air Lieutenant Evidence Edzai Begede aged 28 died on the spot. Such was the force of the impact that one of the pilots was decapitated but there were no further casualties only extensive structural damage to buildings nearby. The plane was destroyed.
- On the morning of 23 April 2015 a K-8 crashed in an open field a few kilometers from Thornhill Airbase after catching fire. Both pilots ejected safely. The plane was destroyed.
- On 29 December 2018, an Aérospatiale Alouette III crashed. The aircraft received substantial damage.
- An SIAI-Marchetti trainer aircraft SF.260 crashed into a compound in Somabhula, about 24 km south-west of Gweru on 24 November 2020 killing Flight Instructor and Squadron Leader Mkhululi Dube and trainee pilot Silungile Sweswe. The plane was destroyed.
- On 23 April 2021, an Agusta Bell 412 AB-412 helicopter from Number 8 Squadron crashed in Arcturus just 32 km east of Harare. It was on a general handling sortie. Four crew members and one child on the ground died. Among the crew was Annita Mapiye, the country's first female Air Force helicopter pilot. No mayday was transmitted. The helicopter was destroyed.
- An Mi-35 helicopter gunship made an emergency landing in an open field in Chitungwiza on 8 July 2021 after the pilot, a group captain, tried his luck on an empty tank against the advice of the engineer. On board were two pilots and five aircraft technicians. They all survived without injuries. The helicopter received substantial damage.
- On 3 February 2023 an SF-260 on a training sortie crashed in the Mlezu college area near Gweru. Both Pilots Group Captain Benson Munyanduki and Wing Commander Daniel Manyenga perished and the lane was destroyed. This was the air force's fourth crash in a little over two years.
- On 15 September 2024, a Eurocopter EC 225LP Super Puma Mk2+ (other sources say Eurocopter AS532 Cougar) crashed. The helicopter was destroyed.
- On 6 February 2025, a Hongdu K-8 Karakorum crashed. The plane was extensively damaged and the pilot was killed.
- On May 30, 2025, a Chengdu J-7 crashed. The plane was destroyed and the pilot was killed.
- On 9 September 2025, a SIAI-Marchetti SF.260 trainer crashed. 2 pilots were killed and the plane destroyed.

== See also ==
- Fylde Air Base
- List of air forces
