= Azim Daudpota =

Pakistani Fighter Pilot

Mohammad Azim Daudpota

25th Governor of Sindh
- In office 12 October 1999 – 25 May 2000
- Preceded by: Mamnoon Hussain
- Succeeded by: Muhammad Mian Soomro

Personal details
- Born: 14 September 1933 Bombay, British India (now Mumbai, India)
- Died: 3 April 2017 (aged 83) Karachi, Sindh, Pakistan
- Occupation: Head of Pakistan International Airlines (1986–1991); Governor of Sindh (1999–2000)
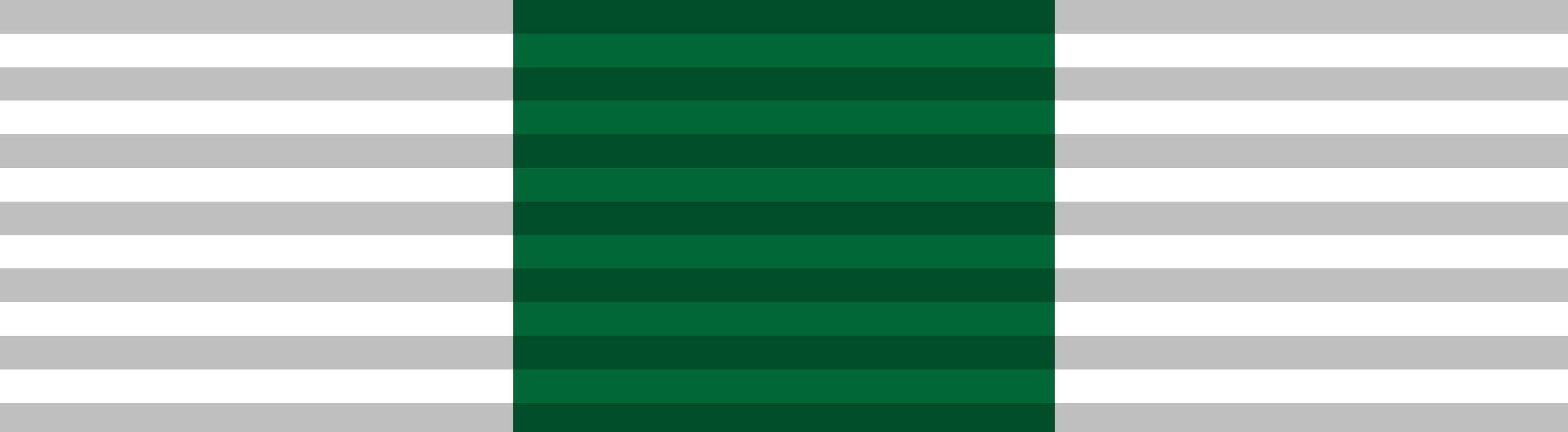
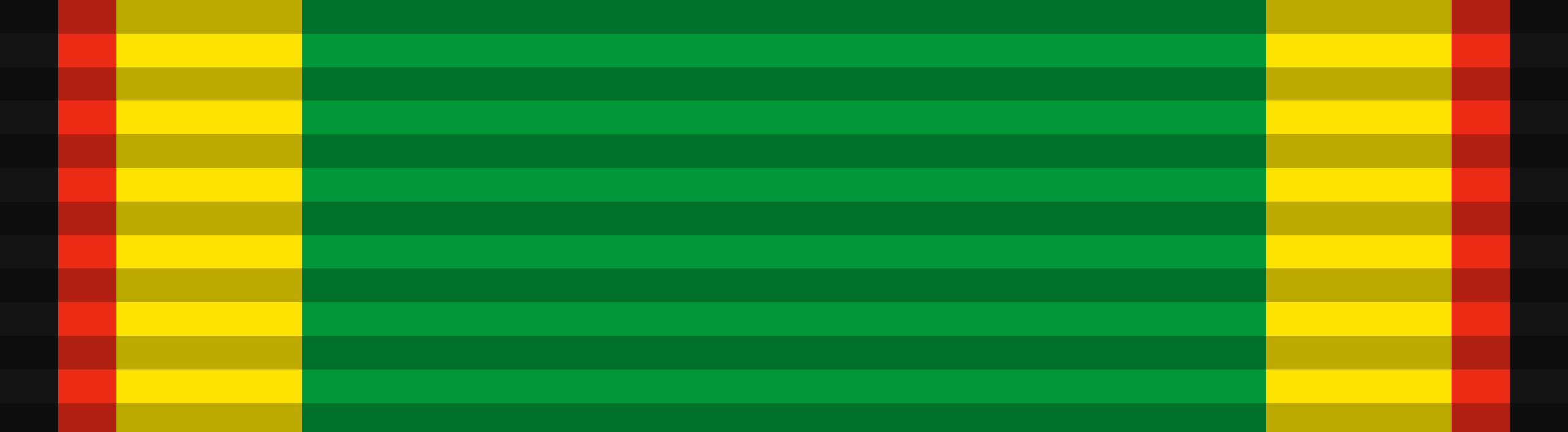
- Awards: Hilal-e-Imtiaz (Military) Sitara-e-Jurat Sitara-e-Imtiaz (Military) Order of Merit (Zimbabwe)

Military service
- Allegiance: Pakistan; Zimbabwe
- Branch/service: Pakistan Air Force; Air Force of Zimbabwe
- Years of service: 1951–1989
- Rank: Air Marshal
- Unit: No. 15 Squadron "Cobras"; No. 17 Squadron "Tigers"
- Commands: Sargodha Airbase; Air Force of Zimbabwe
- Battles/wars: Indo-Pakistani War of 1965; Indo-Pakistani Air War of 1965

Mohammed Azim Daudpota (Sindhi: محمد عظيم دائودپوٽو; 14 September 1933 – 3 April 2017) was a three-star officer in the Pakistan Air Force who went on to serve as the Chief of Air Staff of the Air Force of Zimbabwe, and later briefly served as Governor of Sindh.

== Early life and education ==
Azim Daudpota was born on 14 September 1933 in Bombay (now called Mumbai), British India. His father, Umar Bin Muhammad Daudpota, was a Sindhi research scholar, linguist and historian of the Indus valley. After his basic education at St. Patrick's High School, Karachi, he completed his college education at D. J. Sindh Government Science College, Karachi in 1951.

== Career ==
Daudpota joined the Pakistan Air Force Academy in 1951. The following year, he commenced a course of training at Royal Australian Air Force Academy, graduating in 1956. After service as a pilot and then as Commander of numbers 15 and 17 squadrons, he attended the PAF Staff College before serving on the staff of the Pakistani High Commission in New Delhi. After a further period of training at the Royal College of Defence Studies in London, Daudpota commanded PAF bases Rafiqui and Sargodha.

=== Chief of Zimbabwe Air Force ===
In 1983 the Zimbabweans sought assistance from Pakistan as they wanted to replace the former Rhodesian officer who then headed the Air Force of Zimbabwe. Daudpota was selected and served as Commander of the Air Force of Zimbabwe from July 1983 to January 1986.

== Civilian work ==
On his return to Pakistan, Daudpota became the Managing Director and Chairman of Pakistan International Airlines from January 1986 to March 1991.

He became the Chairman of Pakistan Industrial Development Corporation. He joined Kashmir Corporation as an Executive Director in April 1991; from 25 October 1999 to 24 May 2000, Daudpota also became the Governor of Sindh (1999 – 2000).

At the time of his death, he was the chairman of the board at MacPac Films Limited, a company that makes raw material for packaging.

== Honours and recognition ==
- Sitara-e-Jurat (Star of Courage) Award by the President of Pakistan for his service during the 1965 War against India.
- Sitara-e-Imtiaz (Star of Excellence) Award by the President of Pakistan.
- Hilal-e-Imtiaz (Crescent of Excellence) by the President of Pakistan.
- Order of Merit by the President of Zimbabwe in 1986.

== Death ==
Azim Daudpota died of cardiac arrest on 3 April 2017 in Karachi at age 83 after battling a number of illnesses. He was buried at Pakistan Air Force's Faisal Airbase graveyard in Karachi.

== Awards and decorations ==

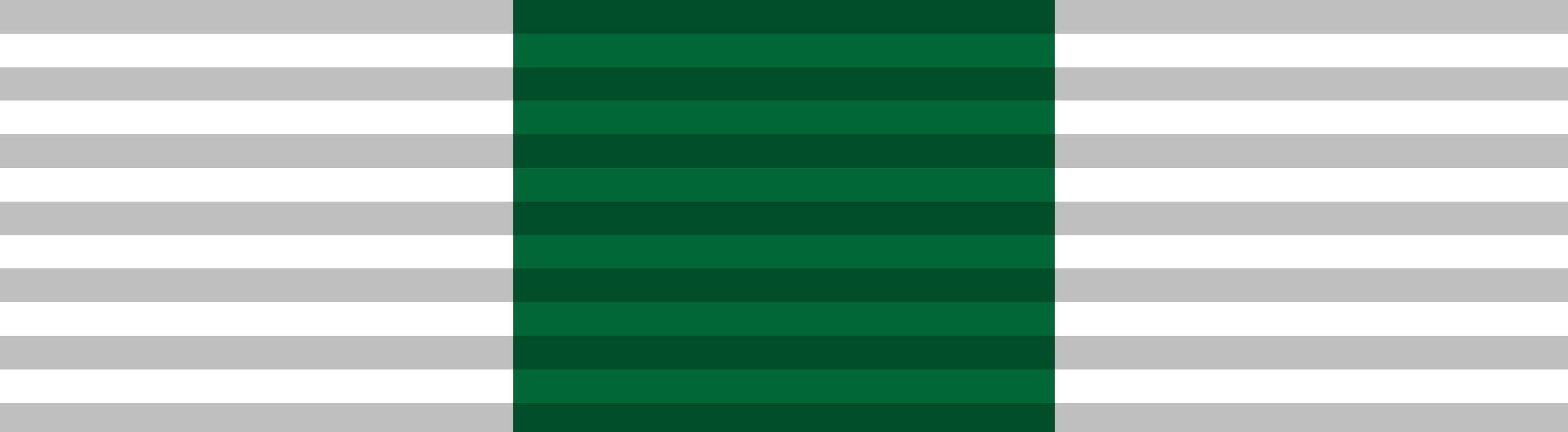

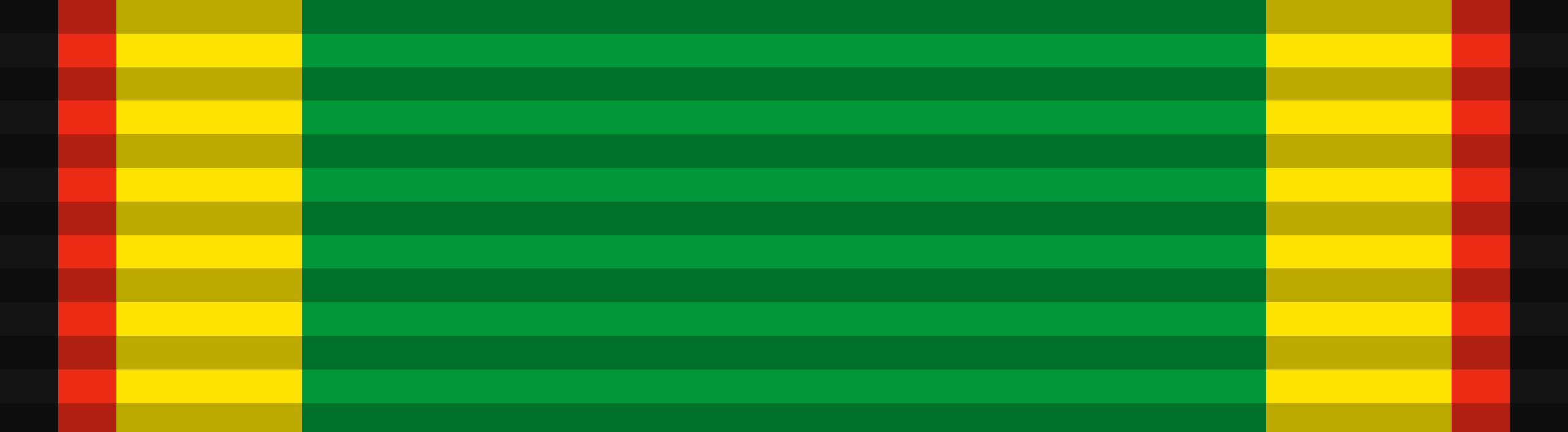

Hilal-e-Imtiaz (Military) (Crescent of Excellence)	Sitara-e-Jurat (Star of Courage)	Sitara-e-Imtiaz (Military) (Star of Excellence)	Tamgha-e-Diffa (General Service Medal)
Sitara-e-Harb 1965 War (War Star 1965)	Tamgha-e-Jang 1965 War (War Medal 1965)	Tamgha-e-Jang 1971 War (War Medal 1971)	Tamgha-e-Sad Saala Jashan-e- Wiladat-e-Quaid-e-Azam (100th Birth Anniversary of Muhammad Ali Jinnah)
Tamgha-e-Jamhuria (Republic Commemoration Medal) 1956	India Service Medal 1939–1945	Queen Elizabeth II Coronation Medal (1953)	Order of Merit (Zimbabwe)

=== Foreign Decorations ===
Foreign Awards
Zimbabwe	Order of Merit

Military offices
Preceded by Norman Walsh	Commander of the Air Force of Zimbabwe; 1983–1986	Succeeded by Josiah Tungamirai
Business positions
Unknown	Chairman of Pakistan International Airlines; 1986–1991	Unknown
Political offices
Preceded by Mamnoon Hussain	Governor of Sindh; 1999–2000	Succeeded by Muhammad Mian Soomro
