= No. 237 Squadron RAF =

British Royal Air Force squadron

No. 237 (Rhodesia) Squadron RAF
- The insignia of the No. 237 Squadron of the Royal Air Force, with the Lion and Tusk of the B.S.A.C., and later Rhodesia.
- Active: 20 August 1918 – 14 May 1919; 22 April 1940 – 1 January 1946
- Country: Southern Rhodesia
- Allegiance: United Kingdom
- Branch: Royal Air Force
- Nickname: Rhodesia
- Mottos: Primum agmen in Cælo (Latin: The vanguard is in the sky)

Insignia
- Squadron Badge: A lion passant guardant charged on the shoulder with an eagle's claw and holding in the front paw an elephant's tusk

No. 237 Squadron was a Royal Air Force aircraft squadron. During the Second World War the unit was formed from No. 1 Squadron Southern Rhodesian Air Force for operations in North Africa.

== History ==
No. 237 Squadron was formed at RAF Cattewater in August 1918 from Nos 420, 421, 422 and 423 flights of the Royal Naval Air Service. The squadron operated the Short 184 on coastal and anti-submarine patrols in the English Channel until it was disbanded at the end of the First World War on 14 May 1919.

By 3 September 1939 the Southern Rhodesia Air Section under Squadron Leader M. Maxwell had arrived at Nairobi in the Kenya Colony. It was then renamed as No. 1 Squadron S. Rhodesian Air Force. 237 Squadron was re-formed as No. 237 (Rhodesia) Squadron on 22 April 1940 when No. 1 Squadron Southern Rhodesia Air Force was taken into Royal Air Force control. It operated a number of Hawker biplanes and was based on the Abyssinian border as an active unit of the East African Campaign, initially to defend British East Africa against the anticipated movement of Italian troops down from their bases to the North. In the autumn of 1940, the squadron moved into Sudan for operations in Eritrea, and Westland Lysanders and Gloster Gladiators were added to its strength. In May 1941 the squadron moved into Egypt and was re-equipped with the Hawker Hurricane, being tasked with tactical reconnaissance duties in the Western Desert. In May 1942 the squadron was deployed to Iraq, as a defence against any German invasion, and then to Libya in an air defence role.

The squadron was re-equipped with the Supermarine Spitfire (Mark VCs first, then Mark IXs) and was moved to Corsica to fly operations over Southern France and Northern Italy. It eventually moved to Italy, where it operated until it was re-numbered as 93 Squadron before being disbanded on 1 January 1946.

== Notable members ==
Ian Smith, who was later Prime Minister of Rhodesia, was assigned to the squadron during his service in World War II, and was shot down over Italy.

== Aircraft operated ==
Dates	Aircraft	Variant	Notes
1918–1919	Short 184		From the RNAS
1940	Hawker Audax		From the SRAF
1940–1941	Hawker Hardy		From the SRAF
1940	Hawker Hart		
1940–1941	Westland Lysander	I and II	
1941	Gloster Gladiator	II	
1941–1942	Hawker Hurricane	I	
1943	Hawker Hurricane	IIC	
1943–1944	Supermarine Spitfire	VB and VC	
1944–1945	Supermarine Spitfire	IX	

== See also ==
- Southern Rhodesia in World War II
