= Badge of the Royal Air Force =

British military emblem

- Armiger: The Royal Air Force
- Adopted: 1923
- Crest: The Imperial Crown
- Shield: In front of a circle an eagle volant and affronté head lowered and to the sinister
- Motto: Latin: Per ardua ad astra, lit. 'through adversity to the stars'
- Earlier version: 1918–1923

The badge of the Royal Air Force is the heraldic emblem used to represent the Royal Air Force (RAF). It features an eagle superimposed on a circlet, which is surmounted by a crown.

== Description ==
The badge was based on a design by a tailor at Gieves Ltd of Savile Row in London. It was first used in August 1918, and the original circlet showed a garter and buckle. The present plain circlet dates from 26 January 1923 when the badge was registered at the College of Arms and, it being noted that the garter and buckle were heraldically incorrect, a substitution was made.

In heraldic terms, the badge is blazoned as: "In front of a circle inscribed with the motto Per Ardua Ad Astra and ensigned by the Imperial Crown an eagle volant and affronté head lowered and to the sinister." Although there have been debates among airmen over the years about whether the bird was originally meant to be an albatross or an eagle, the consensus is that it was always an eagle. When the badge was issued by the College of Arms in 1923, they described the bird as being an eagle.

The badge is depicted on the iron gates at the ceremonial entrance to the Royal Air Force College Cranwell, at the entrance to the Air Forces Memorial in Surrey, and on the Polish War Memorial in London. It was also featured on the reverse of a special series of £2 coins minted in 2018 to mark the centenary of the Royal Air Force.

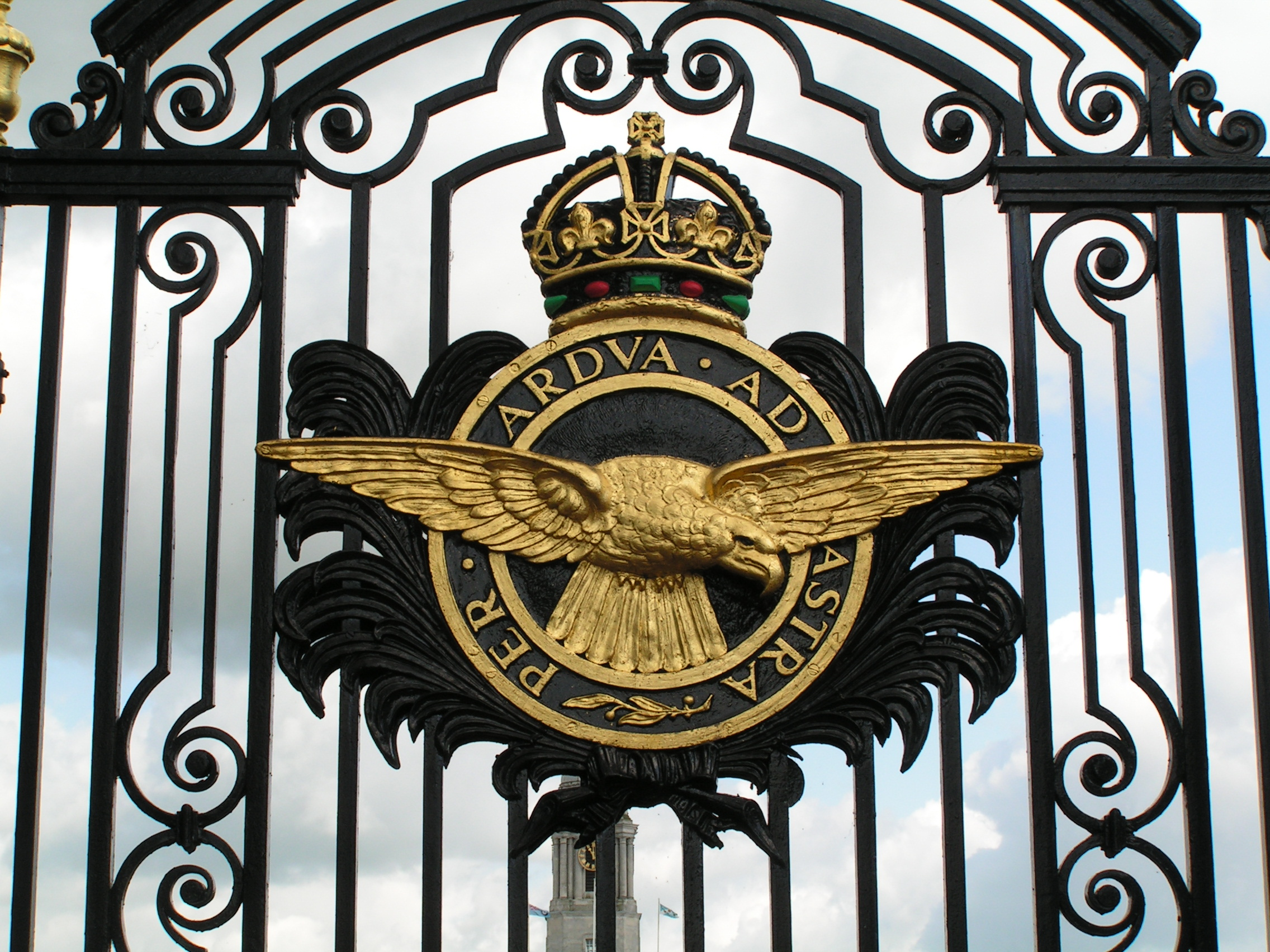
The RAF badge on Cranwell's gates

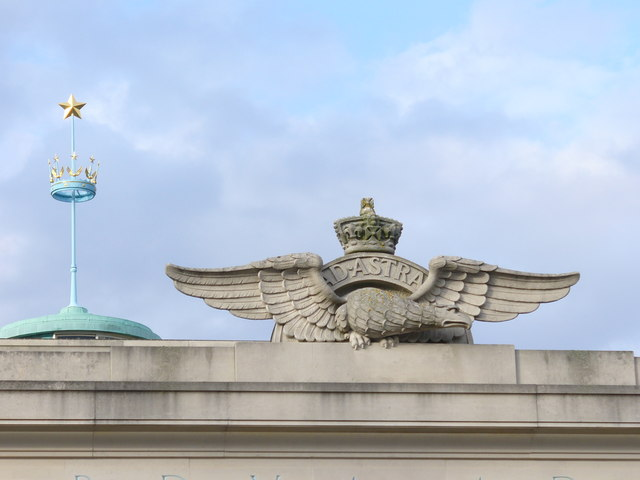
The RAF badge at the Air Forces Memorial

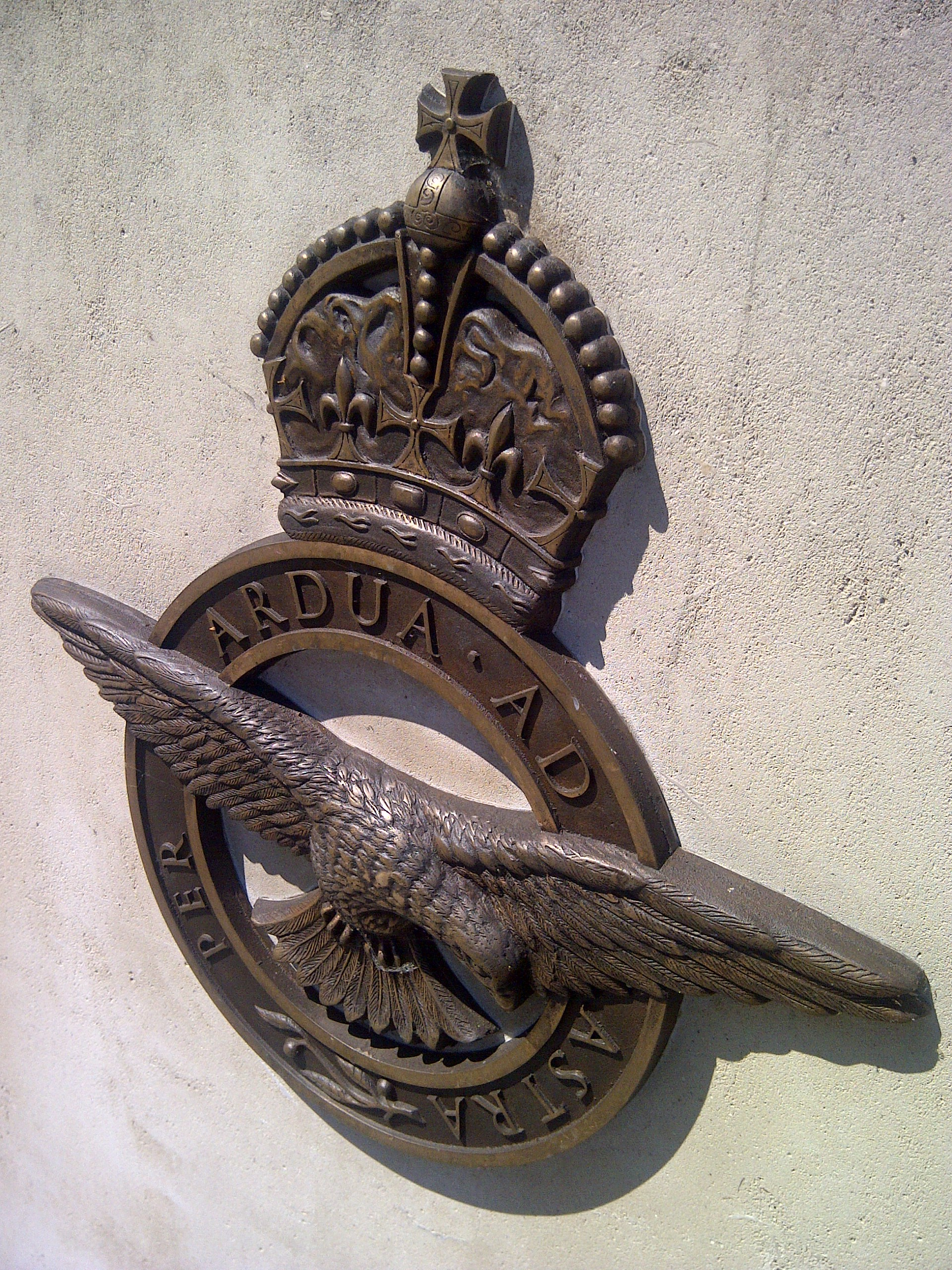
The RAF badge on the Polish War Memorial

== Related badges ==
Numerous Commonwealth air forces have adopted badges that are directly based upon the RAF badge, whilst several other countries' air forces have adopted badges with similar imagery. Several are shown below.

=== Current ===
Indian Air Force

Royal Malaysian Air Force

Royal Netherlands Air Force

Royal Norwegian Air Force

Pakistan Air Force

South African Air Force

Sri Lanka Air Force

=== Former ===
Royal Indian Air Force (1932–1950)

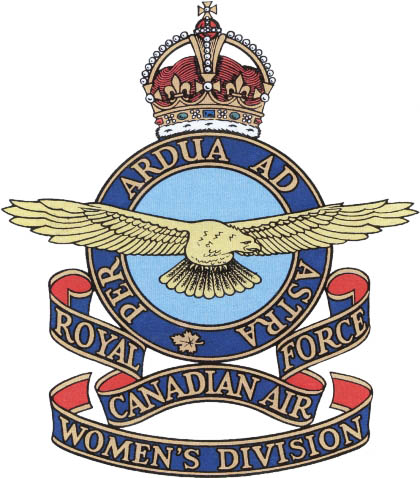
Royal Canadian Air Force Women's Division (1941–1946)

== See also ==
- Heraldic badges of the Royal Air Force
- Royal Air Force Ensign
