= Josiah Tungamirai =

Zimbabwean military officer and politician

Air Chief Marshal Josiah Thomas Mberikwazvo Tungamirai
- Born: 8 October 1948; Gutu, Southern Rhodesia
- Died: 25 August 2005 (aged 56); South Africa
- Military career
- Allegiance: Zimbabwe
- Branch: Air Force of Zimbabwe
- Rank: Air chief marshal
- Nickname: Muzamani
- Commands: Air Force of Zimbabwe
- Other work: Zimbabwean Government Minister

Air Chief Marshal Josiah Tungamirai (8 October 1948 – 25 August 2005), born Thomas Mberikwazvo, was a Zimbabwean military officer and politician. He was commander of the Air Force and later served as Minister of State for Indigenization and Empowerment in President Robert Mugabe's government before his death in 2005.

== Early years and education ==
Tungamirai was born into a peasant family as Thomas Mberikwazvo on 8 October 1948 in Gutu, Masvingo Province, in what was then Southern Rhodesia. He received his primary education at the Mutero Mission in Gutu from 1957 to 1964. His secondary education was completed at the Chikwingwizha Seminary. Tungamirai went up to Salisbury Polytechnic and he completed his studies in Physics and Mathematics in 1970. The Mother of his oldest child Thomas Tungamirai, was Juliette James. Juliette was of Mozambique & Scottish héritage, à freedom fighter, who died in the war for indépendance.

== Military career ==
Tungamirai served in Robert Mugabe's Zimbabwe African National Liberation Army (ZANLA) during the Rhodesian Bush War. He remained loyal to Mugabe during the Nhari and Vashandi inter-factional strife within ZANLA, and was among the ZANLA officials who escaped Zambia, following the Zambian government's arrest of senior ZANU officials after the assassination of Herbert Chitepo. Towards the end of the war, he served as ZANLA Political Commissar.

In 1979 Tungamirai was part of the Patriotic Front delegation which was a party to the Lancaster House Agreement. When Zimbabwe became independent in 1980, Tungamirai became a major general in the newly formed Zimbabwe National Army and was appointed to the Zimbabwe Joint High Command. He was involved in the work to integrate the formerly belligerent Zimbabwe African National Liberation Army and Zimbabwe People's Revolutionary Army as well as the Rhodesian Army.

In 1982 Tungamirai was transferred to the Air Force of Zimbabwe to fill the post of Chief of Staff. At that time he was redesignated an air vice-marshal. Tungamirai qualified as a pilot in October 1984.

Tungamirai went on to reach the rank of air chief marshal and serve as the commander of the Air Force of Zimbabwe.

In 1992 Tungamirai was replaced by Perrance Shiri as Air Force commander.

== Political career ==
In early 2004, Tungamirai was elected to parliament from Gutu North in a by-election. He was soon afterwards appointed to the Cabinet as Minister of State for Indigenisation and Empowerment on 9 February 2004.

He was put on the United States sanctions list in 2003 and remained on the list until his death.

== Death ==
Following what anonymous members of Tungamirai's family said were problems with rejection of a kidney transplant carried out several years previously, Tungamirai was flown to a South African hospital for emergency treatment. He died there on 25 August 2005. After Tungamirai's death, his widow Pamela Tungamirai claimed that he had been poisoned.

Military offices
Preceded by Azim Daudpota	Commander of the Air Force of Zimbabwe; 1986–1992	Succeeded by Perrance Shiri
Political offices
Preceded by New ministry	Minister of State for Indigenisation and Empowerment; 2004–2005	Succeeded by Samuel Mumbengegwi
