= Manyame Air Force Base =

Air base in Zimbabwe

Manyame Air Force Base
- Harare, Harare Province in Zimbabwe

Site information
- Owner: Zimbabwe Defence Forces
- Operator: Air Force of Zimbabwe

Location
- Location within Zimbabwe
- Coordinates: 17°55′39″S 31°06′06″E

Site history
- Built: 1952
- Battles/wars: Rhodesian Bush War

Manyame Air Force Base (IATA: HRE, ICAO: FVRG) is one of the two main air bases for the Air Force of Zimbabwe, and is located at Harare International (Robert Gabriel Mugabe) Airport. Formerly known as New Sarum Air Force Station, Manyame AFB is home to the fixed-wing transport (Falcon) squadron, as well as the two helicopter squadrons (Spider and Scorpion). The base provides a full range of facilities, including workshops, training schools, hospital, and a dog-training unit.

== History ==
Initially, Cranborne Air Base had served as the main base for the Royal Rhodesian Air Force (RRAF), however the post-war urban growth of Harare hindered its capabilities of expansion. In early 1952, Kentucky Airfield was established, located about 9 kilometers southeast from the old air base and Harare. Two runways were built. By February 1952, the RRAF had begun relocating numerous aircraft to the air base, and a sixth hangar was under construction. In August 1952, a runway was completed. On 1 April 1952, the RRAF had moved into the airfield, and it officially began military operations. On 21 August 1952, the first graduation parade was held for the No. 1 Short Service Course. There were 11 graduates, and the parade commander was Captain A.O.G. Wilson, who later became the Commander of the Air Force. In October 1952, a high number of military facilities were completed at Kentucky Airfield, and it became the headquarters of the RRAF. Shortly thereafter, the airfield was renamed to New Sarum Air Force Base. The name of the air base was suggested by Keith Taute, which referred to Old Sarum in Wiltshire, England. It operated with two runways, with one side for civil operations and the other for military. In July 1956, the Salisbury Airport Terminal was opened.

In March 1974, the first night free fall parachute jump was carried out by instructors of the Parachute Training School at New Sarum.

=== Air Force of Zimbabwe ===
After the independence of Zimbabwe in 1980, New Sarum Air Force Base came under control of the Air Force of Zimbabwe. In the 1983 Names (Altercation) Act, New Sarum AFB was renamed to Manyame Air Force Base, which was enacted on 6 May, 1983. From 2015 to 2016, Group Captain Mildred Dengura served as head of Manyame AFB, and was also the first female Base Commander in the Air Force of Zimbabwe. After retirement, she was promoted to the Air Commodore rank. In November 2025, the air base held numerous AFZ events involving the AFZ Charity Fund Initiative, which is a humanitarian aid program aimed at supporting underserved communities.

== Units ==
The following units that were based in Manyame (New Sarum) Air Force Base:

Royal Rhodesian Air Force

- No. 1 Squadron (Vampires) between 1952 and 1957
- No. 2 Squadron (Vampires) between 1952 and 1957
- No. 3 Squadron (Transport)
- No. 4 Squadron (Training)
- No. 7 Squadron, formed at New Sarum in 1962
- No. 8 Squadron, formed at New Sarum in 1978 with Bell 205 helicopters

Air Force of Zimbabwe

- 3rd Squadron (Falcon) - light transport. Operating the Casa 212-200 and Britten-Norman BN-2 Islander.
- 7th Squadron (Spider) - combat helicopter squadron with Alouette III, Mi-35Ps. Plus Eurocopter AS532 Cougar and Mil Mi-38 helicopters for VIP transport.
- 8th Squadron (Scorpion) - Agusta-Bell 412SP

== Accidents & incidents ==
- On 26 March 1971, a fire had broken out while practice bombs were being filled at a bomb dump. Five members of the Air Force were injured, including Sergeant Harry Young who later died from his injuries.
