= Josiah Tungamirai Air Force Base =

Air base in Zimbabwe

Josiah Tungamirai Air Force Base
- Gweru, Midlands Province in Zimbabwe

Site information
- Owner: Zimbabwe Defence Forces
- Operator: Air Force of Zimbabwe

Location
- Location within Zimbabwe
- Coordinates: 19°26′11″S 29°51′43″E

Site history
- Built: 1941
- Battles/wars: World War II; Rhodesian Bush War

Airfield information
- Identifiers: IATA: GWE, ICAO: FVTL
- Elevation: 4,680 metres (15,354 ft) AMSL
Runways
| Direction | Length and surface |
|---|---|
| 13R/31L | 7,826 metres (25,676 ft) Asphalt |
| 13L/13R | 8,766 metres (28,760 ft) Asphalt |
- Sources: World Aero Data GCM

Josiah Tungamirai Air Force Base (IATA: GWE, ICAO: FVTL), formerly known as Thornhill Air Force Base, is one of the two main air bases of the Air Force of Zimbabwe located near the central city of Gweru.

== History ==
In 1939 a committee was set up to locate and survey three sites near Gweru (at that time known as Gwelo) that were suitable for the establishment of an airfield for the Commonwealth Training Group responsible for training aircrews for the defence of the Empire during World War II. The most suitable site comprised a portion of Thornhill farm and an adjacent farm, Glengarry. The first buildings were constructed in 1941 and official use and the beginning of training began in March 1942. Some of the original buildings of this time are still in use at Thornhill. The town of Gwelo and the air station grew during World War II, with a total of 1,810 pilots trained during this time. At the end of WWII, the Royal Air Force retained its Rhodesian Air Training Group (RATG) at RAF Thornhill. The land for the air base was commandeered for the duration of the War and was finally purchased in 1947. On 6 August 1953, the final graduation parade was held, and the Royal Air Force ensign was lowered for the final time. This event marked the end of RAF training in Southern Rhodesia.

=== Post-war RRAF and later AFZ usage ===
Following their withdrawal in 1953, it was taken over by the Royal Rhodesian Air Force (RRAF), as Zimbabwe was then known as Rhodesia. Tarmac runways and concrete hard stands began construction in 1956, allowing jet aircraft to operate from Thornhill AB. Additional upgrades included a radar facility and control tower. In 1956, the No. 9 Short Service Unit was the first course to undergo the Basic Flying School at Thornhill, and were moved to New Sarum to do Advanced Flying School and Operational Conversion Unit courses. On 11 December 1957, the first aircraft landed at the newly completed runway. It was a Vampire piloted by RAF Bentley, who later became Air Vice Marshall. In 1957-58, the No. 10 Short Service Unit was the first course to fully complete their training at Thornhill. In December 1958, a Ground Approach Radar was installed at Thornhill Air Base.

Following the Independence of Zimbabwe in 1980, Thornhill Air Force Base came under control of the Air Force of Zimbabwe. During September 2006, a simulation center was under construction, costing about US $41.5m. A range of amenities and services, which include workshops, transport fleets, equipment depots, and accommodation, sporting and entertainment facilities, support the base. Under Statutory Instrument 138 of 2017, Thornhill Air Force Base was renamed to Josiah Tungamirai Air Force Base in honour of Air Marshal Josiah Tungamirai. Today, Josiah Tungamirai Air Force Base operates as the primary base for the Air Force of Zimbabwe's fighter squadrons due to the ideal climate conditions that it provides. It also housed the Pilot Training School.

== Units ==
The following units that were based at Josiah Tungamirai (Thornhill) Air Force Base:

Rhodesian Air Training Group (RAF)

- No. 26 Elementary Flying Training School
- No. 3 Air Navigation School

Royal Rhodesian Air Force

- No. 4 Squadron

Air Force of Zimbabwe

- No. 2 Squadron (Cobra) - for advanced jet training and close air support. Operates 12 K-8s.
- No. 4 Squadron (Hornet) - equipped with Cessna FTB337G and O-2A
- No. 5 Squadron (Arrow) - interceptor/fighter role with Chengdu F-7 II/IIN and Chengdu FT-7BZ Trainer.
- No. 6 Squadron (Tiger) - with SF-260M, SF-260TP and SF-260W

== Accidents and incidents ==
- On 9 September, 2025, a SIAI‑Marchetti SF.260 trainer operated by the AFZ crashed shortly after take‑off from Josiah Tungamirai Air Force Base. During a planned training flight, the aircraft lost power during initial climb after initially experiencing problems moments before deparure. Both occupants, a flight instructor and a trainee were killed from the crash.

== See also ==
- Transport in Zimbabwe
- List of airports in Zimbabwe
