= Rhodesian Air Force =

- Badge of the Rhodesian Air Force
- Active: 1935–1980
- Disbanded: April 1980
- Country: Rhodesia
- Allegiance: Southern Rhodesia (1935–1953); Rhodesia and Nyasaland (1953–1963); Southern Rhodesia (Note: The official name of the colony remained 'Southern Rhodesia' from the dissolution of Rhodesia and Nyasaland in 1964 to the uni-lateral declaration of independence of (Southern) Rhodesia in 1965. The colony's name was conferred upon it by the UK's Southern Rhodesia (Annexation) Order 1923. The colony uni-laterally re-named itself as 'Rhodesia' after Northern Rhodesia's independence in October, 1964 through legislation by the colonial legislature; the legislation, however, had never received royal assent. This act was considered by London as ultra vires the (Southern) Rhodesian government) (1964–1965); Rhodesia (1965–1979); Zimbabwe Rhodesia (1979); United Kingdom (1979–1980)
- Part of: Rhodesian Security Forces
- Air Headquarters: New Sarum Air Force Base
- Mottos: Latin: Alæ Præsidio Patriæ, "[Our] wings [are] the fortress of the country"
- March: Winged Assegais
- Anniversaries: 28 November
- Engagements: World War II; Rhodesian Bush War

Commanders
- Air Officers Commanding: See Commanders

Insignia
- Identification symbol: See Insignia

The Rhodesian Air Force (RhAF) was an air force based in Salisbury (now Harare) which represented several entities under various names between 1935 and 1980. Originally serving the British self-governing colony of Southern Rhodesia, it was the air arm of the Federation of Rhodesia and Nyasaland between 1953 and 31 December 1963; of Southern Rhodesia once again from 1 January 1964; and of the unrecognised nation of Rhodesia following its Unilateral Declaration of Independence from Britain on 11 November 1965.

Named the Royal Rhodesian Air Force (RRAF) from 1954, the "Royal" prefix was dropped in 1970 when Rhodesia declared itself a republic – the official abbreviation changed appropriately. When the internationally recognised country of Zimbabwe came into being in 1980, the RhAF became the Air Force of Zimbabwe.

== History ==
Formed in 1935 under the name Southern Rhodesia Staff Corps Air Unit as a territorial unit, the first regular servicemen with the unit went to Britain for ground crew training in 1936. Its first pilots were awarded their flying wings on 13 May 1938. The reservists were called up early August 1939 and were posted to Kenya by 28 August. On 19 September 1939, two weeks after the United Kingdom declared war against Germany, the Air Unit officially became the Southern Rhodesia Air Force (SRAF), and Air Unit flights become Number 1 Squadron SRAF.

In 1939, the Southern Rhodesian government amalgamated the SRAF with the civilian airline Rhodesia and Nyasaland Airways (RANA). The ex-RANA aircraft formed the Communication Squadron, which operated internal services within Southern Rhodesia, plus services to South Africa and Mozambique. By January 1940, with Britain at war with Nazi Germany, Royal Air Force (RAF) Air Vice-Marshal Sir Arthur 'Bomber' Harris was desperate for trained aircrew and turned for help to Southern Rhodesia (where Harris had enlisted in 1914). Harris was frustrated by delays launching Commonwealth Air Training Plan stations in Canada, Australia, New Zealand and South Africa.

Southern Rhodesian Prime Minister Godfrey Huggins (1933–53) recognised an opportunity not just to aid Britain and the Allies, but also to boost the domestic economy. The Rhodesian Air Training Group (RATG) installed aviation infrastructure, trained 10,000 Commonwealth and Allied airmen 1940–45 (seven percent of the total) and provided the stimulus for manufacturing that had been lacking in the 1920s and 1930s. Southern Rhodesia's textile, metallurgy, chemical and food processing industries expanded rapidly. The SRAF was absorbed into the RAF proper in April 1940 and redesignated No. 237 (Rhodesia) Squadron RAF. This squadron, initially equipped with Hawker Harts, participated in the East African campaign against the Italians.

Dates	Names
1935–1936	Air Section, 1st Battalion Rhodesia Regiment –
1936–1938	Air Section, Southern Rhodesia Defence Force
1938–1939	Southern Rhodesia Air Unit
1939–1940	No. 1 Squadron, Southern Rhodesia Air Force
1940–1947	No. 237 (Rhodesia) Squadron Royal Air Force
1947	Communications Squadron, Southern Rhodesian Staff Corps
1947–1954	Southern Rhodesian Air Force
1954–1970	Royal Rhodesian Air Force
1970–1980	Rhodesian Air Force
1980	Zimbabwe Rhodesia Air Force
1980 – present	Air Force of Zimbabwe

On 1 June 1941, the Southern Rhodesian Women's Auxiliary Air Services came into being. British No. 44 Squadron RAF and No. 266 Squadron RAF were also assigned the name "(Rhodesia)" because of the large number of Rhodesian airmen and crew in these units. Rhodesians fought in many of the theatres of World War II, including future prime minister Ian Smith who, after being shot down over Italy behind enemy lines, was able to avoid capture and return to Allied lines. Rhodesian airmen suffered 20 percent fatalities, becoming emblematic of a "nation in arms" ideal that peppered settler nationalism and erupted fully in the 1960s. The RAF remained until 1954, indirectly assisting Rhodesian aviation, and many airmen returned with young families as settlers.

=== Post World War II ===
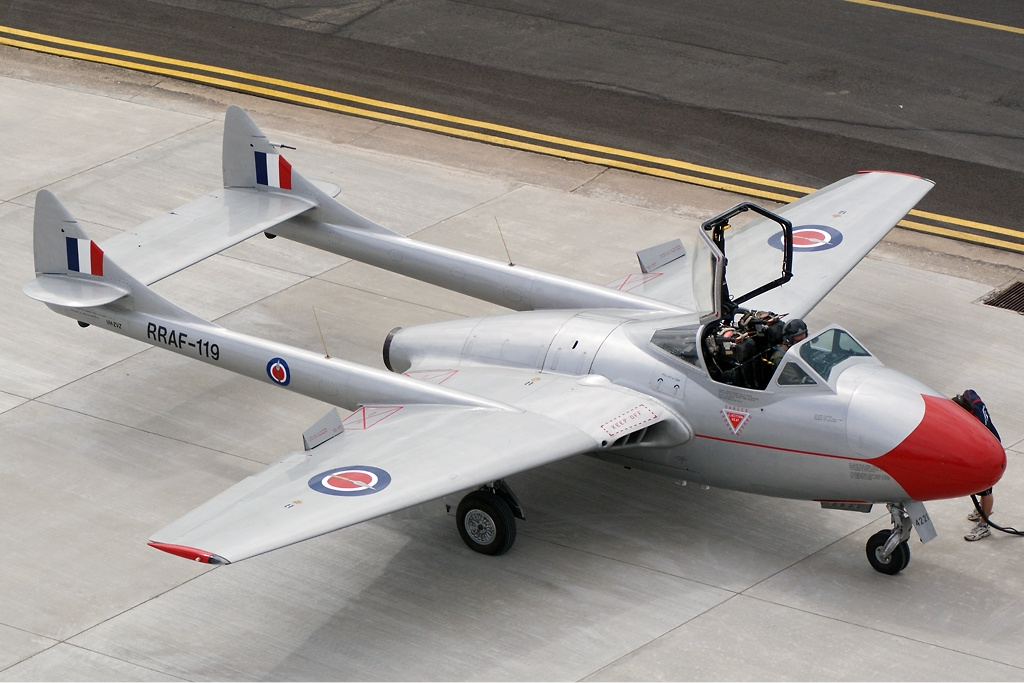
De Havilland Vampire T11 (DH-115) formerly of the Rhodesian/Zimbabwe Air Force.

The SRAF was re-established in 1947 and two years later, Huggins appointed a 32-year-old South African-born Rhodesian Spitfire pilot, Ted Jacklin, as air officer commanding tasked to build an air force in the expectation that British African territories would begin moving towards independence, and air power would be vital for land-locked Southern Rhodesia. The threadbare SRAF bought, borrowed or salvaged a collection of vintage aircraft, including six Tiger Moths, six Harvard trainers, an Anson freighter and a handful of de Havilland Dragon Rapide transport aircraft, before purchasing a squadron of 22 Mk22 war surplus Spitfires from the RAF which were then flown to Southern Rhodesia.

The 20 Spitfires Mk. 22s that survived the ferry flight from the UK entered service with No. 1 Squadron SRAF, initially at Cranborne and then at New Sarum from 1952.

Huggins was anxious to maintain the strong wartime links established with the RAF, not only for access to training and new technology but also because of his growing concern over the expansionist ideas of the newly established apartheid Afrikaner nationalist regime in South Africa. The booming Rhodesian economy allowed more money to be allocated for new aircraft, training and aerodrome facilities, and growing co-operation with the RAF in the 1950s saw the SRAF operating in Northern Rhodesia and Nyasaland, Kenya, Cyprus, Egypt, Jordan, Iraq, Oman and South Yemen.

Huggins maintained his enthusiasm for air power when he became the first prime minister (1953–56) of the semi-independent Federation of Rhodesia and Nyasaland also known as the Central African Federation (CAF) comprising Southern Rhodesia, Northern Rhodesia and Nyasaland. The CAF was viewed as an experiment, a democratic multiracial alternative to apartheid South Africa, and it was widely expected that the new federal state would become independent within a decade. The SRAF became a 'federal' body and received its first jets, 16 de Havilland Vampire FB9 aircraft. On 15 October 1954 the federal air arm was officially designated as the "Royal Rhodesian Air Force" (RRAF). In a well-received move aimed to distinguish the RRAF from the South African Air Force, khaki uniforms and army ranks were abandoned in favour of those utilised by other Commonwealth air forces such as the RAF, RCAF, RAAF and RNZAF.

In the late 1950s, 16 Canberra B2 and T4 bombers were purchased, as well as Provost T52 trainers, Douglas Dakota and Canadair DC-4M Argonaut transports.

In 1962, Hawker Hunter fighter aircraft were obtained, and the Vampire FB9 and T55s were reallocated to advanced training and ground attack roles.

The first Aérospatiale Alouette III helicopters also arrived around this time, equipping Number 7 Squadron.

Despite efforts to broker a consensus, black and white Rhodesians complained that the pace of reform was too slow or too fast and by 1961, it became clear that the Federation was doomed. Following the dissolution of the CAF in 1963, the British government granted independence to Northern Rhodesia (Zambia) and Nyasaland (Malawi) but refused Southern Rhodesia independence until more progress was made towards multiracial democracy. White settler opinion hardened and Ian Smith's Rhodesian Front government issued a Unilateral Declaration of Independence in 1965. Chief of the Air Staff Air Vice Marshal "Raf" Mulock-Bentley was representing Rhodesia in Washington, D.C., and resigned immediately. Bentley's reluctant successor, former Royal Australian Air Force pilot Harold Hawkins had come to Rhodesia with the RATG in 1944 and joined the SRAF in 1947. Hawkins accepted command of the RRAF in the increasingly forlorn hope that the rebellion could be resolved peacefully through negotiation.

Although Southern Rhodesia acquired the lion's share of the Federation's aircraft, the imposition of international economic sanctions in 1965 saw the country abandoned by many aircraft equipment suppliers and maintenance contractors. RRAF aircraft maintenance crews had stockpiled essential items, but the Air Staff knew that metal fatigue, spare parts shortages and the need for new electronic equipment would begin to erode the RRAF's capabilities. In 1968, Air Vice Marshal Hawkins failed to convince Prime Minister Ian Smith that the 'HMS Fearless' settlement threatened by British Prime Minister Harold Wilson was the best result that Rhodesia could expect. Hawkins resigned his command but accepted the post of Rhodesia's diplomatic representative in Pretoria.

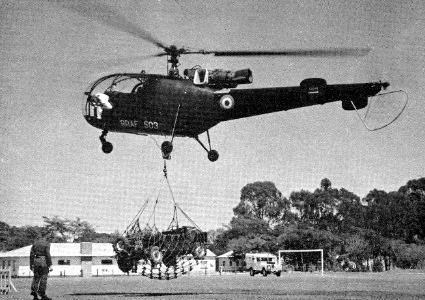
Royal Rhodesian Air Force Alouette III helicopter lifting a short wheelbase Mini Moke in 1962.

When the Rhodesian Bush War intensified after 1972, the age of the aircraft, the shortage of spares and a deteriorating air safety record would become a growing concern for the Air Staff. The abrupt realignment of allies saw Rhodesia increasingly dependent upon South African support. In contrast to the British South Africa Police and the Rhodesian Army, security force airmen possessed skills in demand by other governments and civilian airlines and the RhAF struggled to retain, recruit and instruct technicians.

== Insignia ==
Rhodesian Regiment, Royal Air Force Roundel (1935–1939)

Southern Rhodesian Air Force Roundel (1939–1954)

Federation of Rhodesia & Nyasaland Air Force Roundel (1954–1963)

Royal Rhodesian Air Force Roundel (1963–1970)

Rhodesian Air Force Roundel (1970–1980)
Royal Rhodesian Air Force Ensign (1953–1963)

Royal Rhodesian Air Force Ensign (1963–1970)

Rhodesian Air Force Ensign (1970–1979)

Rhodesian Air Force Ensign (1979–1980)

The SRAF used standard RAF type A roundel, with green/yellow/green bars on each side of the fuselage roundel and type A fin flashes.

The RRAF used standard RAF type A roundels with three small assegais in black and white superimposed on the red center and type A fin flashes. These assegais represented the three territories of the Federation, namely Southern Rhodesia, Northern Rhodesia and Nyasaland.

The Rhodesian Air Force changed to a type D roundel with a single assegai and a type D fin flash. When Rhodesia became a self-declared republic in 1970, the roundel became a green ring with a lion and tusk on a white center.

== Aircraft ==
- Aermacchi AL-60-B2L – "Trojan"
- Aerospatiale SA316/319 Alouette III B
- Agusta Bell 205A – "Cheetah"
- Britten-Norman BN-A Islander
- Canadair C.4 Argonaut
- English Electric Canberra B.2 and T4
- de Havilland DH.82A Tiger Moth
- de Havilland Vampire FB9 and T11
- Douglas Dakota
- Hawker Hunter FGA 9
- Hunting Pembroke C1
- Hunting Percival Provost T52
- North American Harvard
- Reims Cessna FTB337G – "Lynx"
- SIAI Marchetti SF 260 – "Genet"
- Supermarine Spitfire Mk.22
- Douglas DC-7CF
- Beech 95 C-55 Baron
- Cessna 421A
- Hawker Hart
- DH.89 Dragon Rapide
- Hawker Audax Mk.1
- DH.85 Leopard Moth
- Auster J-1 Autocrat
- Avro Anson
- Auster J-5 Aiglet

- Aerospatiale Alouette II – Six helicopters on loan from the South African Air Force, in service from 1974 to 1980.
- Cessna 185 Skywagon – Two civil aircraft impressed into service, about 17 aircraft on loan from the South African Air Force, in service during the 1970s.

== Major air bases ==
=== New Sarum Air Force Base ===
In the early days of Rhodesian aviation, the various air units often lodged in buildings and facilities that they inherited. By the 1940s, it became apparent that a more permanent home for aviation was needed near the capital city, Salisbury. The decision was made to build a completely new airfield at Kentucky Farm to provide a base of operations for civilian airlines and military aircraft.

Work started on the military section of the airfield in 1951. In March 1952, the New Air Headquarters and Technical Headquarters were completed at what was called New Sarum Air Force Base. The name derived from Salisbury's sister city in Wiltshire, England, which for centuries had used the name "Sarum". The RAF station near the English Salisbury was called "Old Sarum". It was therefore appropriate in view of both similarities in name and close association with the Royal Air Force that the new airfield be called "New Sarum."

Manyame Air Base is still regarded as the principal Air Force establishment and provides facilities for four squadrons of aircraft of widely differing roles as well as housing training schools for technicians, security personnel, dog handlers, and the Air Force Regiment. The schools and flying squadrons are supported by a full range of services and amenities including workshops, transport fleets, living quarters, equipment depots, and sporting & entertainment facilities. The station shares with Harare International Airport (then-named Salisbury Airport), one of the longest civil airport runways in the world, 4,725 metres (15,502 ft) or 2.93 miles, but is otherwise a totally self-contained community. The military site, complete with housing complex, is to the south of the crossing runways, whereas the international airport is to the north.

=== Thornhill Air Force Base ===
In 1939 a committee was set up to locate and survey three sites in the Gwelo area that were suitable for the establishment of an airfield for the Commonwealth Training Group responsible for training aircrews for the defence of the Empire during World War II. The most suitable site comprised a portion of Thornhill farm and an adjacent farm, Glengarry. This land was commandeered for the duration of the War and finally purchased in 1947. The first buildings were constructed in 1941 and official use and the beginning of training began in March 1942. Some of the original buildings of this time are still in use at Thornhill today.

The town of Gwelo and the air station grew during World War II. A total of 1810 pilots were trained during this time. Many of these men returned after the war to settle in Rhodesia. Some of them formed the nucleus of the military training schemes which led to the formation of the Southern Rhodesian Air Force.

Thornhill is the home to the fighter squadrons, the training squadrons, and the Pilot Training School, where all Officer Cadets spend up to six months on initial training before beginning flying training with the squadrons. Like New Sarum, Thornhill shares its runway and Air Traffic Control facilities with civil aircraft operators. The military air traffic controllers based at Thornhill are responsible for all air traffic control in the Midlands area.

=== Forward Airfields (FAFs) ===
Airfields that served the Operational Areas in which aircraft were able to directly support security forces' operations. FAFs would also accommodate Fire Forces as well.

FAFs:

- Grand Reef (Umtali)
- Wankie
- Mtoko

== Rank structure ==
Officer ranks

Rank group	General/Flag/Air officers			Senior officers			Junior officers
Royal Rhodesian Air Force (1954–1970)
Royal Rhodesian Air Force (1954–1970)		Air Vice-Marshal	Air Commodore	Group Captain	Wing Commander	Squadron Leader	Flight Lieutenant	Air Lieutenant	Air Sub-Lieutenant
Rhodesian Air Force
Rhodesian Air Force	Air marshal	Air vice-marshal	Air commodore	Group captain	Wing commander	Squadron leader	Flight lieutenant	Air lieutenant	Air sub-lieutenant

Enlisted ranks

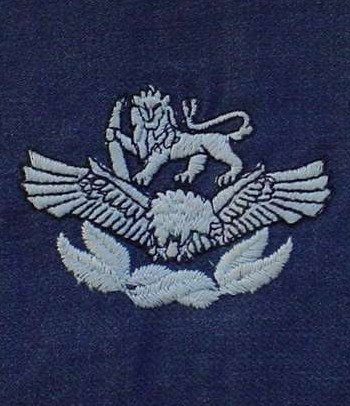
Rank group	Senior NCOs							Junior NCOs		Enlisted
Royal Rhodesian Air Force (1954–1970)												No insignia
Royal Rhodesian Air Force (1954–1970)	Warrant officer	Warrant officer technician		Flight sergeant	Flight sergeant technician (Note: At some point the rank insignia was produced with the crown appearing beneath the chevrons.)	Sergeant	Sergeant technician	Corporal	Corporal technician	Senior aircraftman	Leading aircraftman	Aircraftman
Rhodesian Air Force			Warrant officer class 2 / Master Technician / Master Sergeant									No insignia
Rhodesian Air Force	Station warrant officer	Warrant officer class 1	Warrant officer class 2 / Master Technician / Master Sergeant	Flight sergeant		Sergeant		Corporal		Senior aircraftman	Leading aircraftman	Aircraftman

== Rhodesian Air Force (1970–1980) ==
During the Rhodesian Bush War, the air force consisted of no more than 2,300 personnel and of those only 150 were pilots. These pilots were qualified to fly all the aircraft within the air force so were often involved in combat missions. In addition, they were rotated through the various units so as to give rest to the airmen who would otherwise be constantly on active service.

In March 1970, when Rhodesia declared itself a republic, the prefix "Royal" was dropped and the Service's name became the "Rhodesian Air Force" (RhAF). A new roundel was adopted in the new Rhodesian colours of green and white containing a lion (in gold) and tusk in the centre of the white. The new air force ensign was taken into use on 5 April 1970. The new flag contained the Rhodesian flag in the canton with the roundel in the fly on a light blue field. This marking was displayed in the usual six positions, together with a green/white/green fin flash with a narrow white stripe as in RAF type C.

During the 1970s bush war, Rhodesia managed to obtain Rheims-Cessna 337 (known in Rhodesia as the Lynx), and SIAI Machetti SF260 (known in Rhodesia as the Genet or Warrior – two versions, trainer and ground-attack) piston-engined aircraft, 11 Augusta Bell 205/UH-1 Iroquois (originally from Israel, with Lebanese mediation), and additional Aérospatiale Alouette III helicopters. To the eight bought in 1962–6, 32 more were added between 1968 and 1980 via covert means, but perhaps as many as 27 were South African machines. No jet aircraft could be obtained (except for some Vampires FB9 and T11 aircraft from South Africa). An order for CT/4 trainers was refused by New Zealand.

The RhAF played a key role in the collection of intelligence, using Canberras supplemented with civilian Cessnas for photo reconnaissance and one of their venerable C-47 Dakotas, nicknamed “Warthog,” as an electronic intelligence collector. This aircraft collected and analyzed electronic communications as well as missile and surveillance radar data. Given the remoteness and the lack of friendly forces in areas where insurgents established bases, the strategic importance of these intelligence platforms cannot be understated.22 However, the RhAF had its greatest impact at the operational and tactical levels.

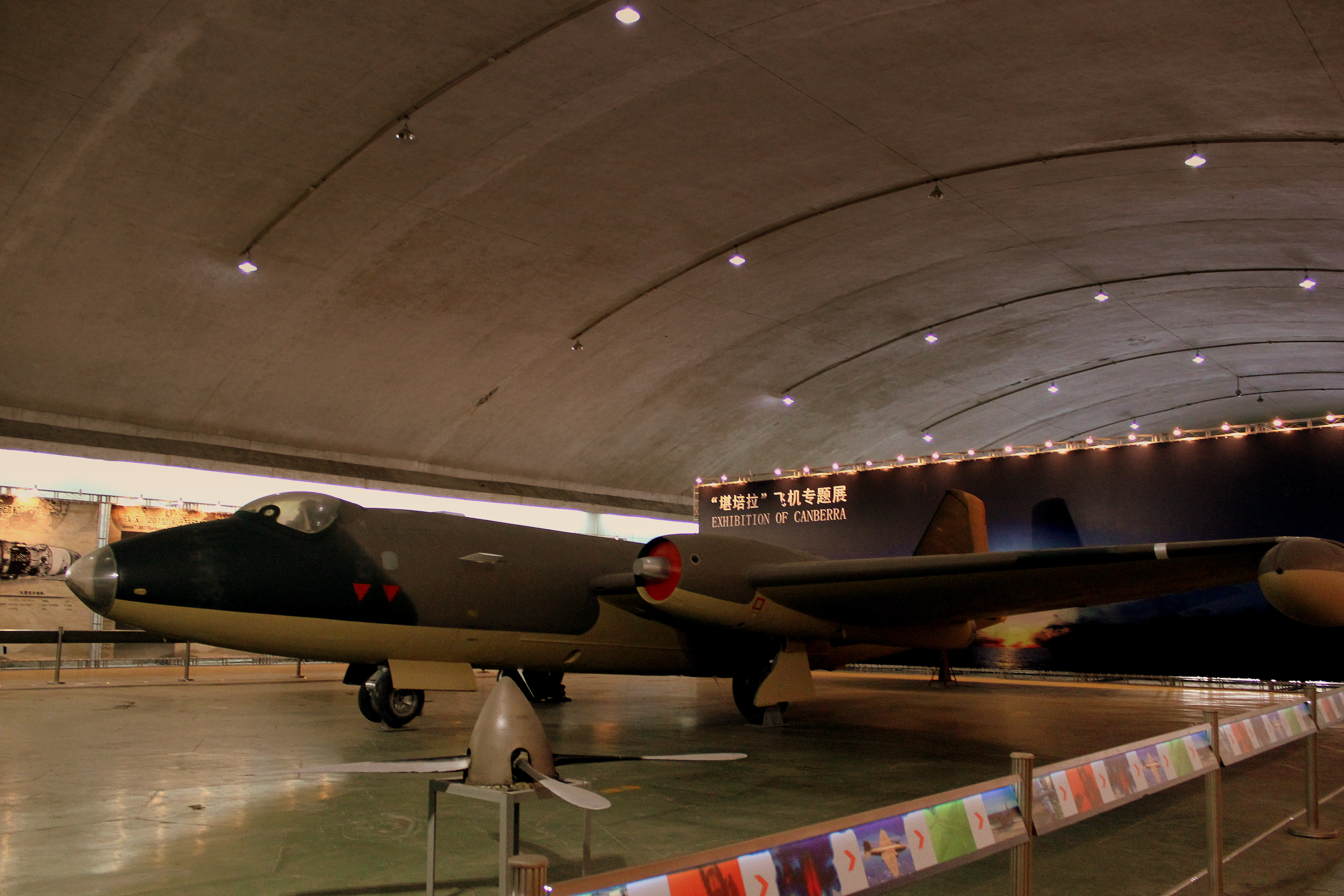
English Electric Canberra late of the Rhodesian Air Force. This example was donated to China after independence.

Drawing upon counter-insurgency experience gained in the Second World War, the Malayan Emergency and the Mau Mau Uprising in Kenya, and adapting more recent Israeli, South African and Portuguese tactics, Rhodesian combined operations (police Special Branch, army, air force) developed 'pseudo-guerrillas', such as the Mozambican National Resistance, (RENAMO) that wreaked havoc across the border, where Zimbabwe African National Liberation Army (ZANLA) guerrilla camps were razed by 'Fireforce' cross-border raids. Fireforce comprised units of Selous Scouts, an undercover tracker battalion of 1,500 troops on double pay, 80 percent black, (many recruited by Special Branch from captured guerrillas facing trial and execution) probing ahead of a parachute infantry battalion of the Rhodesian Light Infantry, and up to 200 Special Air Service commandos. These forces were supported, in turn, by armoured transport columns, mobile field artillery, equestrian pursuit dragoons (Grey's Scouts), air force helicopter gunships and bomber squadrons, one newly equipped with 20 French-made Cessna Lynx low-altitude surveillance aircraft modified for precision ground attacks. Fireforce gathered intelligence, disrupted guerrilla forces, seized equipment and is identified frequently as a precursor of new forms of counterinsurgency warfare. The United Nations condemned the Fireforce raids.

For ground defence, the Rhodesian Air Force had their own armoured car unit equipped with Eland 60s armed with 60 mm breech loading mortars.

== Flying squadrons ==
- No. 1 Squadron – Thornhill (12 x Hawker Hunter FGA.9)
- No. 2 Squadron – Thornhill (8 x Vampire FB.9; 8 x Vampire T.55; plus 13 x Vampire FB.52 on loan from South Africa)
- No. 3 Squadron – New Sarum (13 x Douglas C-47; 1 x Cessna 402; 6 x BN-2A Islander; 1 x DC-7C; 1 x Baron)
- No. 4 Squadron – Thornhill (11 x AL-60F5 Trojan; 21 x Reims-Cessna FTB.337G; 14 x SF.260W)
- No. 5 Squadron – New Sarum (8 x EE Canberra B.2; 2 x EE Canberra T.4)
- No. 6 Squadron – Thornhill (13 x Percival Provost T.52; 17 x SF.260C)
- No. 7 Squadron – New Sarum (6 x Alouette II; 34 x Alouette III)
- No. 8 Squadron – New Sarum (11 x AB.205)

== Air Force of Zimbabwe (1980–present) ==
Zimbabwe Air Force roundel

In June 1979, the short-lived Zimbabwe-Rhodesia government of Abel Muzorewa was installed and the air force flag was the only military flag to be changed to coincide with the change in the national flag. The roundel remained the same.

In the last year of the Rhodesian War and the first few years of Zimbabwe's independence, no national insignia of any sort were carried on Air Force aircraft. This was legal as long as the aircraft did not fly outside of the country's borders.

Following the independence of Zimbabwe in April 1980, the air force was renamed the Air Force of Zimbabwe, but continued to use the emblem of a bateleur eagle in flight, as used by the Rhodesians. The new air force flag retains the light blue field and has the Zimbabwe flag in the canton with the air force emblem in gold in the fly.

In 1982, a new marking was introduced, featuring a yellow Zimbabwe Bird sitting on the walls of Great Zimbabwe. This marking was displayed on the fin of the aircraft or on the fuselage of helicopters. No wing markings were displayed.

In 1994, a new roundel was introduced, featuring the national colours in concentric rings. Initially, the roundel was used in association with the 'Zimbabwe Bird' tail marking used previously, but this was soon replaced by the national flag. The main marking is normally displayed above and below each wing and on each side of the fuselage. However, this seems to be changed, and today the Zimbabwe Bird is also used as a fin flash.

== See also ==
- Fireforce
- List of British Commonwealth Air Training Plan facilities in Southern Rhodesia
