= 2003 in rail transport =

This article lists events related to rail transport that occurred in 2003.

== Events ==
=== January events ===
- (United States) January 1 – E. Hunter Harrison, former president of Illinois Central Railroad (now a subsidiary of CN), succeeds Paul Tellier as president of Canadian National Railway.
- January 18 – The east loop of Singapore's second LRT line, Sengkang LRT line, is opened.
- (United Kingdom) January 21 – The first segment of High Speed 1 in England is completed.

=== March events ===
- (Japan) March 19 – In Tokyo, the northern section of the Hanzomon Line is opened between Suitengumae and Oshiage.
- March 21 – Official launch of M>Train's new Siemens Nexas trains in Melbourne, Australia.

=== April events ===
- (India) April 1 – Five new railway zones of Indian Railways (South Western, North Central, West Central, East Coast, South East Central) started operations.
- (Australia) April 3 – First revenue run of M>Train's new Siemens Mo-Mo train.
- April 5 – The third rapid transit line of the Philippines which is the Manila Line 2, began partial operations from Santolan Station to Araneta Center–Cubao Station.
- (Australia) April 11 – M>Train withdrew fleet of Siemens Mo-Mo trains due to braking and traction issues.
- April 26 – DLW completed construction of the first WDP-4 locomotive to be built entirely within India.

=== June events ===
- June 20 – North East MRT line in Singapore opened. It is the world's first fully underground, automated and driverless rapid transit line.
- (Republic of Ireland) June 21 – The IE 29000 Class Diesel Multiple Unit commuter train enters service in the Dublin Suburban Area.
- (United States) June 22 – Bay Area Rapid Transit opens its extension to Millbrae, where trains interchange with Caltrain services, as well as to San Francisco International Airport.

=== July events ===
- (United States) July 15 – L. Stanley Crane, twice the Railroader of the Year, died of pneumonia at a hospice in Boynton Beach, Fla.
- (United States) July 21 – A tornado knocked down most of the former Erie Railroad's Kinzua Bridge.
- (United States) July 25– David Laney was promoted to Chairman of the Board of Directors for Amtrak.
- (United States) July 26 – The original Los Angeles County Metropolitan Transportation Authority Gold Line opens for revenue service between Los Angeles Union Station and Sierra Madre Villa.
- (United Kingdom) July 30 – Eurostar train number 3313/14 established a new speed record in England at 334.7 km/h (208 mph) on High Speed 1.

=== August events ===
- (India) August 9 – Indian Railways began passenger train service between Hyderabad and Secunderabad with 13 trains between Lingampally and Hyderabad, and 11 between Lingampally and Secunderabad.
- August 10
  - M>Train (Melbourne, Australia) returned fleet of Siemens trains to service.
  - Okinawa Urban Monorail (Yui Rail), Naha Airport Station to Shuri Station route open in Okinawa Island, Japan.
- (United States) August 22 – Sound Transit connected to Tacoma, Washington.
- (Malaysia) August 31 – Opening of KL Monorail in Kuala Lumpur.

=== September events ===
- September 1 – Deutsche Bahn took over operations of shipping company Stinnes Group in Germany.
- (United States) September 25 – James J. Dermody became President of Long Island Rail Road in New York.
- (United Kingdom) September 28 – The first segment of High Speed 1 in England, is opened.

=== October events ===
- October 1 – M>Train (Melbourne, Australia) withdrew its fleet of Siemens trains for the second time.
- October 7 – Renfe opened the Madrid–Lleida section of the system's new standard gauge AVE Madrid–Barcelona high-speed rail line via Zaragoza in Spain.
- October 27 – Fleet of Siemens trains returned to M>Train (Melbourne, Australia) service, some minus livery.

=== November events ===
- (United States) November 3 – NYC Subway's "Redbird" R36 trains make final run from 42nd Street Times Square to Willets Point Shea Stadium.
- November 4 – A new intermodal service was inaugurated between Aiton, France, and Orbassano (near Turin), Italy, to transport complete trucks (both the tractor and trailer) and their loads. The trains include coach seating for the truck drivers.
- November 28 – SNCF (France) celebrates the one-billionth passenger on its TGV.

=== December events ===
- (Japan) December 1 – JR West discontinued service on the Kabe Line between Kabe and Sandankyō stations.
- December 5 – Opening of 15.34 km (9.53 mi) Severomuysky Tunnel on Baikal Amur Mainline after twenty-seven years’ construction.
- (United Kingdom) December 9 – The European Commission approved the franchise of the First TransPennine Express between Liverpool, Manchester, Newcastle and other northern England locations as a joint operation of FirstGroup and Keolis.
- (United States) December 17 – AirTrain JFK opened in New York City.
- December 20 – The KCR West Rail in Hong Kong started services.
- (United Kingdom) December – Great North Eastern Railway, operators of services on the East Coast Main Line between England and Scotland, began trials of 802.11b wireless LAN access to the Internet on their Mallard InterCity 225 trains.

== Accidents ==
- January 3 – Ghatnandur train crash: A passenger train travelling from Secunderabad to Manmad, crashed into the rear end of a heavy goods train near Ghatnandur in Maharashtra, India, killing 18 people.
- January 27
  - (Italy) A head-on collision between an Italian and a French train in the Tende line's Biogna tunnel left two dead and four seriously injured.
  - 2003 Mumbai bombing: A bicycle bomb exploded near Vile Parle railway station in Mumbai, India, killing one person.
- January 31 – The Waterfall rail accident occurred near Waterfall, New South Wales, Australia. A train derailed, killing seven people on board.
- (Zimbabwe) February 1 – The Dete train crash killed 50 people in the Zimbabwean town of Dete in the Western part of the country about 90 miles (140 km) from Victoria Falls.
- February 18 – An arsonist caused the Daegu subway fire when he set fire to a train stopped at the Joongang-ro (or Jungang-ro) station of the Daegu Metropolitan Subway in Daegu, South Korea.
- (India) March 13 – 2003 Mumbai train bombing: A bomb in a ladies' compartment exploded as a train pulled into Mulund station, killing 10 people.
- May 15 – The Ladhowal rail disaster was a flash fire on the Frontier Mail train service in India, which engulfed three carriages. 39 people lost their lives.
- June 23 – The Vaibhavwadi train crash killed 53 people near the village of Vaibhavwadi in Sindhudurg district, Maharashtra in India.
- July 2 – The Warangal train crash killed 22 people in the town of Warangal, Andhra Pradesh, in India.
- (Republic of Ireland) October 7 – The Cahir viaduct on the Limerick–Rosslare railway line partly collapsed under a cement train travelling to Waterford. No one was hurt but the line remained closed until the following September for repairs to the bridge.
- (Russia) December 5 – 2003 Stavropol train bombing: A suicide bomb blast on a Kislovodsk–Mineralnye Vody commuter train in Stavropol Krai as it was leaving Yessentuki killed at least 46 people and injured more than 170.

== Deaths ==
=== June deaths ===
- (Argentina) June 10 – Livio Dante Porta, Argentinian steam locomotive mechanical engineer (born 1922).

== Industry awards ==
=== Japan ===
Awards presented by Japan Railfan Club

- 2003 Blue Ribbon Award: Kintetsu 21020 series Urban Liner Next EMU
- 2003 Laurel Prize:
  - Okayama Electric Tramway 9200 series "Momo" tramcar
  - Kagoshima City Transportation Bureau 1000 series "U-tram" tramcar

=== North America ===
2003 E. H. Harriman Awards

Group	Gold medal	Silver medal	Bronze medal
A	Norfolk Southern Railway		
B	Metra	Soo Line Railroad	
C			
S&T	Terminal Railroad Association of St. Louis	Conrail	

Awards presented by Railway Age magazine

- 2003 Railroader of the Year: Richard K. Davidson (Union Pacific)
- 2003 Regional Railroad of the Year: Indiana Harbor Belt Railroad
- 2003 Short Line Railroad of the Year: San Joaquin Valley Railroad

=== United Kingdom ===
Train Operator of the Year

- 2003: Anglia Railways
