= Chief of Defence (Zimbabwe) =

Senior military appointment in Zimbabwe

Commander of the Zimbabwe Defence Forces
- Incumbent; Emmanuel Matatu since 21 November 2025
- Ministry of Defence
- Reports to: Minister of Defence
- Appointer: President of Zimbabwe
- Formation: 1977
- First holder: Peter Walls

The Commander of the Zimbabwe Defence Forces is Chief of the Zimbabwe Defence Forces and the national defence organisations.

== List of chiefs ==
=== Commander Combined Operations (Comops), Rhodesian Security Forces ===
During May 1977, a Combined Operations headquarters (or "Comops" as it was referred to) was formed to direct the activities of all Rhodesian Security Forces. Prior to this, each service had its own command structure and active operations were co-ordinated, at a local level, through Joint Operation Commands (or JOCs). The first (and only) Commander Comops was Lieut.-General G. Peter Walls, former head of the Rhodesian Army. Air Marshal 'Mick' J. McLaren was Deputy Commander.

No.	Portrait	Commander	Took office	Left office	Time in office	Ref.
1	Peter Walls GLM, DCD, MBE	Lieutenant General; Peter Walls GLM, DCD, MBE (1926–2010)	1977	1980	2–3 years	

=== Chairman, Joint High Command ===
Following the electoral victory of Robert Mugabe's ZANU party on 4 March 1980 a Joint High Command was established to oversee the integration of the former warring armies. Lieut.-General Peter Walls (former Commander of the Rhodesian Combined Operations) was appointed as Chairman of the Joint High Command. Other members included: Lieut.-General A. C. L. ‘Sandy’ Maclean (former Commander Zimbabwe-Rhodesian Army); Air Vice-Marshal Frank Mussell (former Commander Zimbabwe-Rhodesian Air Force); ‘Lieut.-General’ Lookout Masuku (former Commander Zimbabwe People's Revolutionary Army, ZIPRA); ‘Lieut.-General’ Solomon T. Mujuru, alias Rex Nhongo (former Commander Zimbabwe African National Liberation Army, ZANLA); and Mr Alan Page (Secretary of Defence).

No.	Portrait	Commander	Took office	Left office	Time in office	Ref.
1	Peter Walls GLM, DCD, MBE	Lieutenant General; Peter Walls GLM, DCD, MBE (1926–2010)	March 1980	July 1980	4 months	

=== Commander of the Zimbabwe Defence Forces ===
In July 1980 Lieut-General Walls resigned and was exiled from Zimbabwe. Lieut-General ‘Sandy’ Maclean was appointed by then Prime Minister Mugabe as the Commander of the Zimbabwe Defence Forces on 8 August 1980, and promoted to General.

No.	Portrait	Commander	Took office	Left office	Time in office	Ref.
1	Andrew 'Sandy' Maclean	General; Andrew 'Sandy' Maclean (?–2019)	8 August 1980	31 July 1982	1 year, 357 days	
2	Solomon Mujuru	General; Solomon Mujuru (1949–2011)	1 August 1982	1992	10–11 years	
3	Vitalis Zvinavashe	General; Vitalis Zvinavashe (1943–2009)	July 1994	31 December 2003	9 years, 5 months	
4	Constantino Chiwenga	General; Constantino Chiwenga (born 1956)	1 January 2004	19 December 2017	13 years, 352 days	
5	Philip Valerio Sibanda	General; Philip Valerio Sibanda (born 1954)	19 December 2017	21 November 2025	7 years, 337 days	
6	Emmanuel Matatu	General; Emmanuel Matatu (born 1960)	21 November 2025	Incumbent	290 days	
