= Ambrose Gunda =

Brigadier General Ambrose Paul Gunda (died June 28, 2007) served in the military of Zimbabwe, heading the Presidential Guard, and allegedly participated in an attempted coup d'état against the Mugabe administration in June 2007.
