= Philip Valerio Sibanda =

Zimbabwean general (b. 1954)

General Philip Valerio Sibanda

Commander of the Zimbabwe Defence Forces
- In office 18 December 2017 – 21 November 2025
- President: Emmerson Mnangagwa
- Preceded by: Constantino Chiwenga
- Succeeded by: Emmanuel Matatu

Commander of the Zimbabwe National Army
- In office December 2003 – 18 December 2017
- President: Robert Mugabe; Emmerson Mnangagwa
- Preceded by: Constantino Chiwenga
- Succeeded by: Edzai Chimonyo

Personal details
- Born: 24 December 1954 (age 71) Zimbabwe
- Profession: Senior Military Commander

Philip Valerio Sibanda (born 24 December 1954) is a decorated Zimbabwe general who has served as commander of the Zimbabwe Defence Forces from December 2017 until 21 November 2025. He was promoted from lieutenant general to full general at that time. As lieutenant general he had served as commander of the Zimbabwe National Army.

== Personal life ==
General Sibanda grew up in Midlands Province in what was at the time Southern Rhodesia. He attended the newly opened Marist Brothers Secondary School in Dete.

== Rhodesian Bush War ==
During the Zimbabwe Liberation War, Sibanda trained and served as a ZIPRA military combatant. Sibanda left the country in 1973. He received military training at Morogoro under the likes of Retired Brigadier Ambrose Mutinhiri. His alias was Ananias Gwenzi. In 1974 after completing his training in Tanzania him and four others: Elisha Gagisa (Stanely Nleya), Elias Ndou, Abel Mazinyane and Joel Dambudzo were sent to Lebanon where they spent 9 months of rigorous training under the Palestine Liberation Organization at Jalub.

Upon his return in 1975, he became an instructor at the newly opened Mbwembwesi training camp in Tanzania. He was then seconded to form part of the military commanders running Morogoro under the ZIPA. Among the Morogoro-based Zanla Commanders in ZIPA were Contsantine Chiwenga (commissar), Perence Shiri and Augustine Chihuri (Stephen Chocha). From ZIPRA there was Eddie Sigoge Mlotshwa and Sam Fakazi. He also became the commander of the GC-B region.

After Nikita Mangena was killed by the enemy in 1978, Sibanda became camp commander for the CGT (Communist Guerrilla Training) camp, located about 60 miles east of Lusaka. He was initially appointed to the ZIPRA High Command as chief of training however he swapped that position with Eddie "Sigoge" Mlotshwa for Chief Of Reconnaissance leading the Military Intelligence department.

== After independence ==
Sibanda was attested into the Zimbabwe National Army at independence. He quickly rose through the ranks, by 1994 he was the only ex-ZIPRA cadre to have risen to the rank of major general. Major General Jevan Maseko was the first former ZPRA cadre to rise to that rank.

Between October 1995 and April 1998 he became the head of United Nations Angola Verification Mission (UNAVEM III) and subsequently MONUA (Mission d’Observation des Nations Unies en Angola) as the Force Commander charged with peace and national reconciliation.
