= Anselem Nhamo Sanyatwe =

Zimbabwean national army commander

The Honourable Lieutenant General (Rtd.) Anselem Sanyatwe.

Minister of Sport, Recreation, Arts and Culture of Zimbabwe
- Incumbent
- Assumed office 25 March 2025
- President: Emmerson Mnangagwa
- Deputy: Emily Jesaya
- Preceded by: Kirsty Coventry

Commander of the Zimbabwe National Army
- In office 20 October 2023 – 25 March 2025
- President: Emmerson Mnangagwa
- Preceded by: David Sigauke
- Succeeded by: Emmanuel Matatu

Commander of the Presidential Guard
- President: Robert Mugabe; Emmerson Mnangagwa

Personal details
- Born: 21 January 1956 (age 70) Zimbabwe

Military service
- Allegiance: Zimbabwe Defence Forces
- Branch/service: Zimbabwe National Army
- Rank: Lieutenant general

Anselem Nhamo Sanyatwe (born 21 January 1956) is the Minister of Sport, Recreation, Arts and Culture of Zimbabwe and a former Zimbabwe National Army Commander. He was named as a ZNA commander on the 20 October 2023 and served in this position until 25 March 2025. He also served as the commander of the Presidential Guard, during which he ordered his forces to open fire on protesters in 2018, killing eight people. He was appointed to the Zimbabwean cabinet as Minister of Sport, Recreation, Arts and Culture, taking over from Kirsty Coventry, following her election as President of the International Olympic Committee.
