= Zimbabwe National Army =

- National Army Flag
- Founded: 18 April 1980; 46 years ago (as current service) 1898; 128 years ago (as Southern Rhodesia Volunteers)
- Country: Zimbabwe
- Type: Army
- Size: 25,000
- Part of: Zimbabwe Defence Forces
- Motto: "Our swords are the shield of the nation"
- Colors: Green, Yellow
- Anniversaries: Defence Forces Day (2nd Tuesday in August)
- Engagements: 1980 Entumbane clashes; 1981 Entumbane Uprising; Gukurahundi (Operations against Matabeleland 'dissidents'), 1982 to 1987; Mozambican Civil War, 1983 to 1992; Angolan Civil War; Somalia (UNOSOM II), 1992 to 1994; Second Congo War, 1998 to 2002
- Website: www.zna.gov.zw

Commanders
- Commander-In-Chief: President Emmerson Dambudzo Mnangagwa
- Commander of the National Army: Lieutenant General Asher Walter Tapfumaneyi
- Chief of Staff, General Staff: Major General Augustine Chipwere
- Chief of Staff, Quartermaster Staff: Major General Simo Maseko
- Notable commanders: Peter Walls; Vitalis Zvinavashe; Edzai Absolom Chimonyo; Solomon Mujuru; Constantino Chiwenga; Philip Valerio Sibanda; David Sigauke; Anselem Nhamo Sanyatwe

The Zimbabwe National Army (ZNA) is the primary branch of the Zimbabwe Defence Forces responsible for land-oriented military operations. It is the largest service branch under the Zimbabwean Joint Operations Command (JOC). The modern army has its roots in the Rhodesian Army, which was raised between 1963 and 1964 after the breakup of the Federation of Rhodesia and Nyasaland. A Joint High Command created in March 1980 to oversee integration of the formerly belligerent Rhodesian Security Forces, Zimbabwe African National Liberation Army (ZANLA), and the Zimbabwe People's Revolutionary Army (ZIPRA) officially established the Zimbabwe National Army in late 1980, nearly a year after the end of the Rhodesian Bush War.

The mission statement of the army is "to defend the sovereignty, territorial integrity and national interests of Zimbabwe and to contribute to international peace and security" a mandate the force has been able live up to in the region. It is considered an integral component of the JOC, and falls under the ultimate authority of the President of Zimbabwe. The ZNA is directed by a Chief of the Army, the senior official being an Army Chief of Staff. Zimbabwe's highest ranking army officer as of 29 March 2025 is Lt. Gen. Emmanuel Matatu. In 2011, Harare continued to maintain a statutory strength of 40,000 active personnel; actual numbers hover closer to 30,000.

== History ==
=== Origins ===
The origins of the Zimbabwe National Army lie in the formation of the Southern Rhodesia Volunteers in 1898, a mounted corps supported by bicycles, a signal troop, and engineers. Raised by colonial authorities to suppress further uprisings after the Second Matabele War, it included a "Western division" and an "Eastern division" staffed by European volunteers. Field outings were conducted in concert with the British South Africa Police (BSAP). In 1899, the Royal Rhodesia Regiment was founded, with many recruits coming from the Southern Rhodesia Volunteers.

The majority of the Southern Rhodesia Volunteers were disbanded in 1920 for reasons of cost, the last companies being disbanded in 1926. The Defence Act of 1927 created a Permanent Force (the Rhodesian Staff Corps) and a Territorial Force as well as national compulsory military training. In 1927, the Rhodesia Regiment was reformed as part of the nation's Territorial Force. The 1st Battalion was formed in Salisbury (Harare) with a detached "B" company in Umtali and the 2nd Battalion in Bulawayo with a detached "B" Company in Gwelo. Between the World Wars, the Permanent Staff Corps of the Rhodesian Army consisted of only 47 men. The British South Africa Police were trained as both policemen and soldiers until 1954.

By the time Salisbury joined the Central African Federation there were three battalions. As Southern Rhodesia was the dominant territory in the federation, its officers represented the senior commanders in charge of all federal units. During this period Southern Rhodesians served overseas on active duty for the British Empire, most notably in Malaya, Kuwait, and Aden.

When the federation was dissolved in 1963, Southern Rhodesia retained the personnel raised in its territory, including the largest proportion of white soldiers – some 3,400 of the 7,000 men who served in the defunct Federal Army. Over objections raised by newly independent African governments in Northern Rhodesia (Zambia) and Nyasaland (Malawi), it also claimed the majority of armoured vehicles and the potent strike aircraft of the Royal Rhodesian Air Force.

Recruitment and training for an insurgent campaign against the colony's administration by rival African nationalists from the Zimbabwe African People's Union (ZAPU) and the Zimbabwe African National Union (ZANU) began in 1963, and intensified after Rhodesia's Unilateral Declaration of Independence in 1965. The Rhodesian Bush War, which lasted roughly fifteen years until late 1979, resulted in the creation of two major insurgent armies, expansion of the Rhodesian Army, and militarisation of local society. By 1980 there were an estimated 150,000 Zimbabweans with military training or experience, access to arms, and allegiance to an established political organisation. Conscription had been introduced in 1955, and the National Service Act in 1976 provided for 12 months of full-time military service regardless of rank. Three-year reservist obligations for white, Coloured, and Asian males also continued. Personnel strength of the regular army peaked at 20,000 active members (half of them whites) and 2,300 with the air force. The paramilitary BSAP had 11,000 police and a reserve of 35,000. These uniform commands and others – including 20,000 Security Force Auxiliaries loyal to interim politicians and a 3,500-man Guard Force for securing protected villages – fell under the authority of Combined Operations (COMOPS), headed by Lieutenant-General Peter Walls.

=== Integration ===
The Zimbabwe National Army was formed in 1980 from elements of the Rhodesian Army, integrated to a greater or lesser extent with combatants from the Zimbabwe African National Liberation Army (ZANLA) and Zimbabwe People's Revolutionary Army (ZIPRA) guerrilla movements (the armed wings of, respectively, the Zimbabwe African National Union (ZANU) and Zimbabwe African People's Union (ZAPU).

Following majority rule in April 1980 and the cantonment of the ZANLA and ZIPRA under Operation Midford, British Army trainers (the British Military Advisory and Training Team, BMATT) oversaw the integration of guerrilla fighters into one unified army. A battalion structure was overlaid on the existing Rhodesian Army. For the first year a system was followed where the top-performing candidate became battalion commander. If he or she was from ZANLA, then his or her second-in-command was the top-performing ZIPRA candidate, and vice versa. This ensured a balance between the two movements in the command structure. From early 1981 this system was abandoned in favour of political appointments, and ZANLA/ZANU fighters consequently quickly formed the majority of battalion commanders in the ZNA.

The ZNA was originally formed into four brigades, 1 Brigade, Matabeleland, 2 Brigade, Mashonaland, 3 Brigade, Manicaland, and 4 Brigade, Masavingo. These comprised a total of 29 battalions. The brigade support units were composed almost entirely of specialists of the former Rhodesian Army, while unintegrated battalions of the Rhodesian African Rifles were assigned to the 1st, 3rd and 4th Brigades. A 5th was formed in 1981 and deployed primarily against ex-ZIPRA dissidents until 1987. The unit was later implicated in an extrajudicial purge of suspected dissidents and their supporters, known as Gukurahundi.

From August 2021, the ZNA is under the command of Lt General David Sigauke, who took over from General Edzai Absolom Chanyuka Chimonyo following the latter's death.

== Operations ==
=== Mozambique Civil War ===
==== Raids on Gorongosa ====
Some Mozambican National Resistance (RENAMO) elements had crossed from Mozambique into Zimbabwe several times, had robbed some shops along the border and had burned down a timber factory. After several meetings with Mozambican officials it was agreed that the ZDF could pursue into Mozambique any RENAMO elements that might have raided Zimbabwe. This was the basis on which the ZDF started planning follow-up operations which took them deep into Mozambique culminating in occupation of former RENAMO bases at Gorongosa.

==== Operation Lemon ====
The first of these Zimbabwe Defence Forces (ZDF) follow-up operations was launched from Katiyo and Aberdeen in northern Manicaland, code-named Operation Lemon. The operation lasted from 5–9 December 1984. It comprised elements of 3 Infantry Brigade, the Special Forces of Zimbabwe the 1 Parachute Regiment, Zimbabwe Special Air Service (SAS), and was supported by the Air Force of Zimbabwe (AFZ). Bad weather conditions and the difficult mountainous terrain reduced the use of aircraft, and all the trooping had to be done by helicopters. The movement of troops on the ground was also difficult. Four contacts were made and two RENAMO bases were destroyed. However, most RENAMO elements in the bases managed to escape and only eight were captured.

The ZDF considered this operation as a major failure and the code word Lemon was co-opted to mean any failure in all subsequent operations. It was further established that there were no other permanent bases in the area, only some advance posts and temporary bases used by RENAMO as launching pads for food raids into Zimbabwe. It was also revealed for the first time that the main RENAMO bases were at Messinse, Chito, Nyazonia, Buetoni, Gorongosa Central Base and Casa Banana.

==== Operation Grape Fruit ====
The report for Operation Lemon was taken seriously by the commanders of the ZDF, and in July 1985 preparations for major offensive operations were started. Rehearsals for a Fireforce operation were carried out at Inkomo Barracks near Harare. Three infantry brigades were mobilised together with the Parachute Group, One Commando Battalion and the AFZ. Men and equipment were moved to Chimoio in Mozambique, with a Forward Replenishment Point (FRP) being established at Grand Reef near Mutare.

Intelligence sources had indicated that RENAMO's main regional base in Manica province was at Muxamba and that Casa Banana was the national stronghold of RENAMO. Both bases had to be attacked and Muxamba was targeted first, being only 70 kilometres south of Chimoio. The most important consideration however, was the hope that activities around Muxamba might divert RENAMO's attention from monitoring too closely the movement of the three heavily armed Zimbabwean infantry battalions marching from Chimoio towards the Gorongosa Mountains.

Muxamba was believed to hold at least 400 RENAMO elements commanded by Major General Mabachi. The attack on Muxamba was launched on 20 August 1985 by elements of 3 Brigade, supported by the Parachute Group and the AFZ. The operation went on for four days with minor problems for the ZDF. One helicopter was riddled with small arms fire but managed to return to Chimoio.

==== Raid on Cassa Banana ====
Intelligence sources had indicated that Cassa Banana, RENAMO's national headquarters had a strength of 400 elements. However, the organisation maintained a string of other smaller bases along the Gorongosa Mountains, which were considered as part of the main base. This raised the total estimated strength in the area to 1,000 elements. During the night of 27 August 1985, three Zimbabwe infantry battalions were established in their Form Up Points (FUP) with the help of the SAS and Commando elements. At Chimoio a Fireforce was being given final briefing, and five AFZ planes were given orders for a first light take-off for Gorongosa on the morning of 28 August.

Although the RENAMO elements captured at Katiyo had given a grid reference for Cassa Banana, further intelligence had cast some doubt as to which of the several RENAMO bases scattered on all sides of the Gorongosa Mountains was the actual headquarters of RENAMO. It was because of this uncertainty that the Fireforce was divided into three sections each with one helicopter gunship, two transport helicopters and two transport aircraft with paratroopers.

Each Fireforce section was detailed to attack specific suspected RENAMO positions around the Gorongossa Mountains. It was during this three pronged attack that one helicopter flew overhead Cassa Banana airstrip and the pilot noticed a green pickup truck disappearing into some bushes. It was then that the pilot recognised the place as that given at the briefing as Cassa Banana. The jets from Thornhill, which were already in place overhead a predetermined Initial Point (IP), were then talked on to the target, and the raid on Cassa Banana began.

The aircraft attacked the target, knocking out several Anti-Aircraft gun positions. Two helicopter gunships continued to hit suspected strategic positions and managed to flash out several pockets of resistance. A third helicopter was directing the dropping of the first wave of paratroopers. When the paratroopers had entered the base, the infantry battalions, which were close by, were ordered to move in and occupy strategic positions. The Fireforce then moved on to deal with the several pockets of resistance from the smaller RENAMO bases all along the Gorongosa Mountains. It took the whole day to silence all of these pockets of resistance.

There is no official Zimbabwean record of the number of casualties on the first raid on Cassa Banana. However, considering the amount of effort, the numbers of troops involved on both sides, and the time it took to capture the base, there must have been a lot of deaths and injuries on both sides.

==== Operation Lifeline ====
This corridor is a tarred 263-kilometre (163 mi) road running from Nyamapanda on the Zimbabwean border through the Mozambican city of Tete to Zobue on the Malawi border. After UDI in 1965, this route carried Rhodesian goods to and from Malawi, which had not applied United Nations sanctions against the Smith regime. After the independence of Mozambique in 1975, the bulk of Malawi's trade with South Africa went through Rhodesia by road via Tete. It was only in 1984 that trade via this route declined because of RENAMO attacks.

It was in the wake of these developments that in June 1984 the governments of Malawi, Mozambique and Zimbabwe formed a joint security committee 13. The aim of the committee was to monitor operations on a day-to-day basis and to attempt to remove all security threats along the Tete Corridor. Zimbabwe's First Mechanised Battalion was ordered to move into Mozambique and they established their headquarters in Tete thereby securing the strategic bridge crossing the Zambezi River. In 1985, President Samora Machel of Mozambique formally requested the governments of Tanzania and Zimbabwe to contribute troops for "the restoration of law and order" in Mozambique. This led to the deployment of Tanzanian troops north of the Zambezi river and Zimbabwean troops to the south.

The decision to send Zimbabwean troops to help restore law and order in Mozambique was partly influenced by Zimbabwe's close relationship with the Mozambican government which dates back to FRELIMO's assistance during Zimbabwe's war of liberation. There was also the underlying fact that FRELIMO and ZANU shared a common Marxist ideology of scientific socialism. The South Africa-backed RENAMO professed to be an anti-communist movement, as did Jonas Savimbi's UNITA movement, which was fighting against the Marxist MPLA government of Angola. There was thus an ideological alliance of the Maputo – Harare – Luanda axis, with support for these governments from the Soviet Union. The fact that the United States of America was providing covert and overt support to opposition movements such as UNITA in Angola and RENAMO in Mozambique reflected the extension of the Cold War to Southern Africa.

=== Angola (United Nations Angola Verification Missions) ===
There were three United Nations Missions to Angola under UNAVEM. UNAVEM I (January 1989 to June 1991) and UNAVEM II (May/June 1991 to February 1995) involved small numbers of unarmed military observers. Brigadier Michael Nyambuya of Zimbabwe was Chief Military Observer of UNAVEM II between December 1992 and July 1993. During UNAVEM III a Zimbabwean battalion was deployed to eastern Angola, based in the town of Saurimo. Nine Zimbabwean peacekeepers died during the UNAVEM deployments.

=== Angolan Civil War ===
After several hints, some of which the Zimbabwean Government denied, for the first time the ZDF Commander, General Constantine Chiwenga, acknowledged ZNA involvement in the Angolan Civil War.

It was reported that Zimbabwe had more than 2,000 combat troops, including 20 military intelligence officers, deployed in Angola whose presence has helped the Angolan Armed Forces to overrun Jonas Savimbi's strongholds, according to reports reaching the Zimbabwe Independent.

=== Somalia (United Nations Operation in Somalia II) ===
Zimbabwe deployed a national contingent to UNOSOM II on 15 January 1993. The initial deployment comprised an infantry company group of 163 personnel under Major Vitalis Chigume. By June 1993 the deployment had built up to a full battalion of 939 soldiers. This battalion was rotated every six months until October 1994, when new deployments ceased, and the last Zimbabweans were finally withdrawn in early 1995.

Four Zimbabweans lost their lives during the UNOSOM mission in Somalia. These included Private Themba Moyo, who was killed by local militia in an altercation during August 1994.

=== Equatorial Guinea, 2015 to present ===
In January 2015 a contingent of Zimbabwe Defence Forces and Zimbabwe Republic Police personnel, reportedly including the Commando Anti-Terrorism Unit, were deployed to Equatorial Guinea to provide security and support during the Africa Cup of Nations tournament. The deployment followed a bi-lateral agreement between the two countries' heads of state and was code named Restoring African Pride. Equatorial Guinea had agreed to host the prestigious tournament at the last minute after the original host country, Morocco, pulled out.

This initial deployment to Equatorial Guinea was followed from November 2015 by an ongoing training mission. When one ZDF training contingent returned to Harare in January 2017, following a year-long deployment to Equatorial Guinea, it was suggested by senior ministers that was "not the end of the mission".

In June 2018, after Zimbabwean President Robert Mugabe had been replaced by President Emmerson Mnangagwa, it was reported that the ZDF training mission to Equatorial Guinea was continuing. A photograph published at the time shows Zimbabwean soldiers wearing AU brassards, suggesting the training mission had African Union endorsement.

=== Operation Restore Legacy, 2017 ===
Between 13 November and 18 December 2017 the Zimbabwe Defence Forces deployed in a dramatic intervention in domestic politics to force the resignation of long-time President Robert Mugabe. The operation was stated to have the objective of removing criminal elements that had surrounded the President, 'resulting in anxiety and despondency among the public'. This referred to a number of politicians from the ruling ZANU-PF party that supported President Mugabe's wife and seemed intent on manoeuvering her into the presidency once her aging husband could no longer fulfil that role. Senior members of the defence forces and ZANU-PF reportedly saw this group as a threat to their authority and their own plans, and believed the group did not represent the generation that had suffered during the liberation war of 1966−1980. The defence forces arrested several members of the group and, while showing respect to the President, placed Mugabe under effective house arrest until he agreed to resign from the presidency. Emmerson Mnangagwa, a former vice-president and senior ZANU-PF member, was later appointed as president and senior generals were rewarded with promotion or political appointment.

== Organisation ==
=== Formations ===
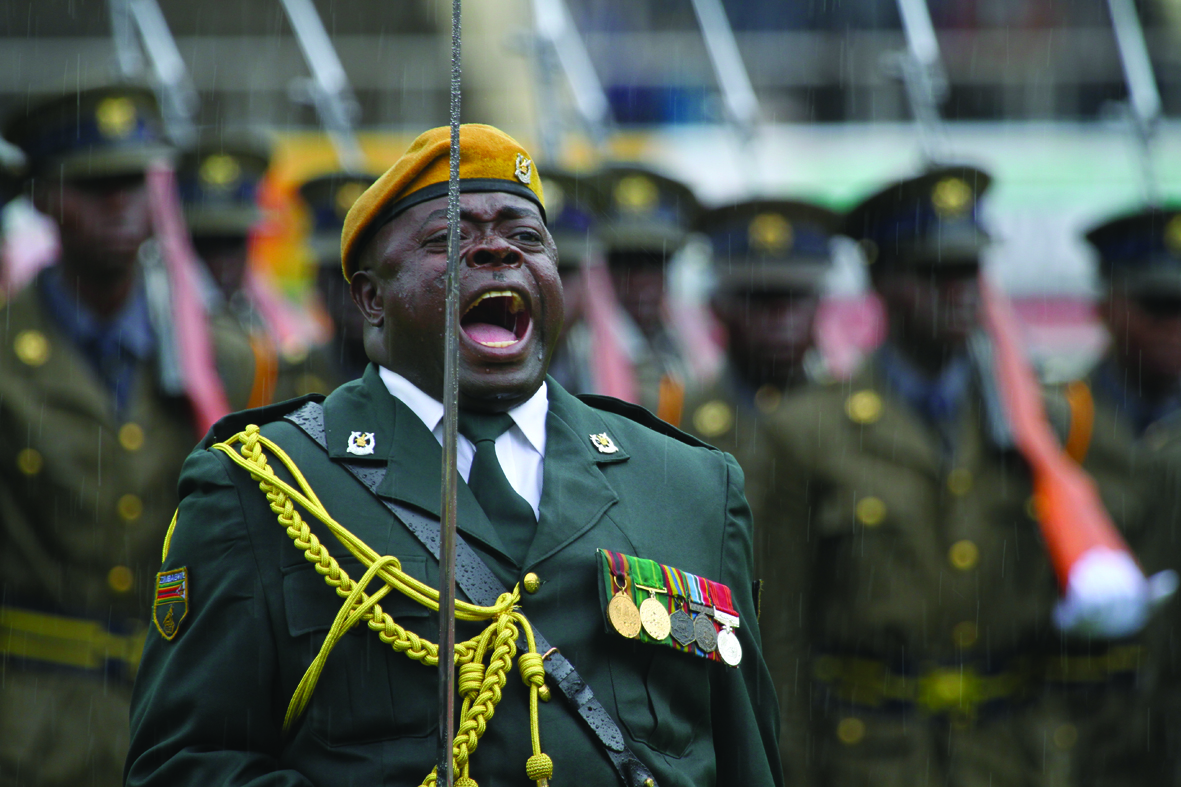
An officer of the Presidential Guard commanding a parade.

The Zimbabwe National Army has eight brigade-sized formations, plus two district commands. These are 1 to 5 Infantry Brigades, Presidential Guard Brigade, Mechanised Brigade and Artillery Brigade, Harare District and Bulawayo District.

- 1 Infantry Brigade, Khumalo Barracks, Bulawayo (Brig. Gen. George Chitsva)
- 2 Infantry Brigade, Kaguvi Barracks (formerly Old Cranborne Barracks), Harare (Brig. Gen. Million Ndlovu)
- 3 Infantry Brigade, Herbert Chitepo Barracks, Mutare (Brig. Gen. Arnold Gumbo)
- 4 Infantry Brigade, Gava Musungwa Zvinavashe Barracks, Masvingo (Brig. Gen. Exesbios Tshuma)
- 5 Infantry Brigade, Ngezi Barracks, Kwekwe (Brig. Gen. Justin Mujaji, from 1 March 2012) Deputy Commander to February 2014 was Col. Morgan Mzilikazi Current Deputy Commander may be Col. Svitswa.
- Presidential Guard Brigade, Dzivarasekwa Barracks, Harare (Brig. Gen. Fidelis Mhunda)
- Mechanised Brigade, Inkomo Barracks, Harare (Maj. Gen. Paul Chima, Deputy Brigade Commander Col. Charles Shumba)
- Artillery Brigade, Domboshava (Brig. Gen. Stanley Mangena), Deputy Brigade Commander Col. Everson Nyamangodo.
- Harare District. Deputy Commander in 2014 was Lt. Col. Posani Matsaka.
- Bulawayo District. (Col. Exsebios Vusa Tshuma, although he is more recently reported as promoted to 4 Inf Bde commander).

One, now dated, web publication gave the infantry brigade organisation as:

- Three Combat Groups with 35 APCs each
- Reconnaissance Company (12 EE-9 Cascavel)
- Signals Company
- Mortar Battery (6 81/82-mm or 120-mm)
- SAM 3 Advanced battery
- Engineer company
- Supply and transport
- Workshop
- Medical units

=== Units ===
- 1 Parachute Battalion (or Parachute Regiment) – Inkomo Barracks, Nyabira (Lt. Col. Jameson Bishi). Formed in 1981 and distinguished by maroon berets.
- 1 Commando Battalion (or Commando Regiment) – Charles Gumbo Barracks, Harare (Lt. Col. Lazarus Kativhu). Formed in 1981 and distinguished by 'tartan green' berets.
- Special Air Service (Lt. Col. Casper Nyagura)
- Mounted Infantry Regiment – Amoth Norbert Chingombe Barracks, Inkomo
- 1 Presidential Guard Battalion – State House, Harare. Distinguished by yellow berets.
- 2 Presidential Guard Battalion – Dzivarasekwa Barracks, Harare. Distinguished by yellow berets.
- Armoured Regiment – Nkomo Barracks, Harare
- 1 Mechanised Battalion – Inkomo (Lt. Col. Colleen Mafika, from January 2018)
- 2 Mechanized Battalion – Darwendale.
- 11 Combat Group – Induna Barracks, Bulawayo (Lt. Col. Oscar Tshuma) Note: Video footage of 1 Brigade colours on parade shows the correct titles of units are '11 Combat Group' and '12 Infantry Battalion'.
- 12 Infantry Battalion – Hwange
- 13 Reserve Force Battalion – Plumtree?
- 21 Combat Group – Mutoko
- 22 Infantry Battalion (Lt Col Terryson Marufu) – Mudzi
- 23 Combat Group – Magunje
- 31 Combat Group – Mutare
- 32 Combat Group – Tsanzaguru (Maj. Stephen Tadius Chifamba Rtd 2004), Rusape.
- 33 Combat Group – Changadzi Barracks, Mutare (or Chipinge)
- 41 Combat Group – Masvingo Barracks, Masvingo
- 42 Combat Group – Mupandawana, Gutu
- 43 Infantry Battalion (Combat Group? Buffalo Range, Chiredzi Rutenga (or Masvingo)
- 51 Infantry Battalion (Combat Group?) – Dadaya, Zvishavane (or Battlefields, Ngezi)
- 52 Infantry Battalion (Combat Group?) – Battlefields, Ngezi
- 53 Infantry Battalion – Battlefields, Ngezi
- 1 Field Regiment (Lt. Col. Chitungo) – Alphida Farm, Domboshawa
- 2 Field Regiment – Alphida Farm, Domboshawa
- 1 Air Defence Artillery Regiment(Lt. Col Last Sithole) – Redcliff Barracks (formerly Ponderossa Barracks), Redcliff
- 1 Engineer Regiment – Pomona Barracks, Harare
- 2 Engineer Regiment – Pomona Barracks, Harare
- Engineering Construction Regiment – Pomona Barracks, Harare.
- National Demining Squadron
- 3 Brigade Engineers (Maj. Chamunorwa Gambiza)
- 4 Brigade Engineer Squadron (Maj. Fikilephi Dube)
- 5 Brigade Engineers – Kwekwe
- Boat Squadron (part of the Special Forces of Zimbabwe) – Nyami-Nyami, Kariba
- Central Ammunition Depot (CAD) – Darwendale
- Bulawayo Ordnance (Lt. Col. W. Mushawarima)

=== Training establishments ===
- Zimbabwe National Defence University – Harare
- Zimbabwe Staff College – Josiah Magama Tongogara Barracks, Harare
- Zimbabwe Military Academy (ZMA) – Gweru
- Zimbabwe School of Infantry (Z S Inf) – Mbalabala
- All Arms Battle School (AABS) – Nyanga
- Recruit Training Depot (RTD) – Imbizo Barracks, Bulawayo
- Field Artillery Training School (Lt. Col I Chitungo)- Ngezi Barracks, Battlefields
- Zimbabwe School of Military Engineering (ZSME) – Pomona Barracks, Harare.
- Armour Training School – Inkomo Barracks, Nyabira
- Bomb Range Training Camp – Esigodini
- Lazy Nine Training Ground – Shurugwi
- Katanga Range – Kwekwe
- Godhlwayo Training Area – Matabeleland North
- Wafa-Wafa Commando Training Grounds – Kariba.
- 1.2 Battalion Satellite Training Centre – Hwange.
- 2.3 Combat Group Satellite Training Centre – Magunje.
- 53 Infantry Battalion Recruit Satellite Training Centre – Battlefields.
- School of Signals
- School of Military Intelligence
- Instructors Training School
- Military School of Music
- Medical Training School
- Ordnance and Transport Training School
- School of Military Police
- Information Technology Training School
- School of Logistics
- Pay Corps Training School
- Army School of Physical Training and Sports (Commandant: Lt. Col. Camble Sithole)

== Personnel ==
These are the Zimbabwe National Army ranks authorised for use today and their equivalent Commonwealth designations. The ranking order is largely based on the British system, with the Air Force of Zimbabwe maintaining separate titles inherited from the Rhodesian Air Force.

=== Commissioned Officers ===
The ZNA lost many of its best trained and experienced officers in the early 1990s, failing to recruit or instruct enough personnel to make up for the imbalance caused by death, emigration, or retirement. By the outbreak of the Second Congo War, only a handful of the officer corps had seen action. An interim measure was the rapid promotion of troops from non-combat units, often selected for their political connections rather than leadership competence. Theoretically, promotions continue to be based on the pre-independence system, which dictates officers below the rank of lieutenant colonel pass a proficiency examination to qualify for advancement. In times of downscaling, those with poorer marks must retire or accept an immediate demotion.

Rank group	General / flag officers				Senior officers			Junior officers
Zimbabwe National Army
Zimbabwe National Army	General	Lieutenant general	Major general	Brigadier	Colonel	Lieutenant colonel	Major	Captain	Lieutenant	Second lieutenant

Previous Army Commanders

- Lt. Gen. Asher Walter Tapfumaneyi (from November 2025).
- Lt. Gen. Emmanuel Matatu (March 2025 to November 2025).
- Lt. Gen. Anselem Nhamo Sanyatwe (to March 2025).
- Lt. Gen. David Sigauke(2021-2023)
- Lt. Gen. Edzai Absolom Chanyuka Chimonyo (December 2017 to July 2021).
- Lt. Gen. Philip Valerio Sibanda (January 2004 to December 2017)
- Lt. Gen. Constantine Guveya Chiwenga (July 1994 to 31 December 2003)
- Lt. Gen. Vitalis M. 'Fox' Gava Zvinavashe (1992 to 1994)
- Gen. T. R. Solomon Mujuru (1981 to 1992)
- Lt. Gen. Alistair ‘Sandy’ C. L. Maclean (18 April 1980 to 1981)

=== Enlisted personnel ===
Rank group	Senior NCOs					Junior NCOs		Enlisted
Zimbabwe National Army								No insignia
Zimbabwe National Army	Regimental sergeant major	Warrant officer class 1	Warrant officer class 2	Staff sergeant	Sergeant	Corporal	Lance corporal	Private (or equivalent)

== Equipment ==
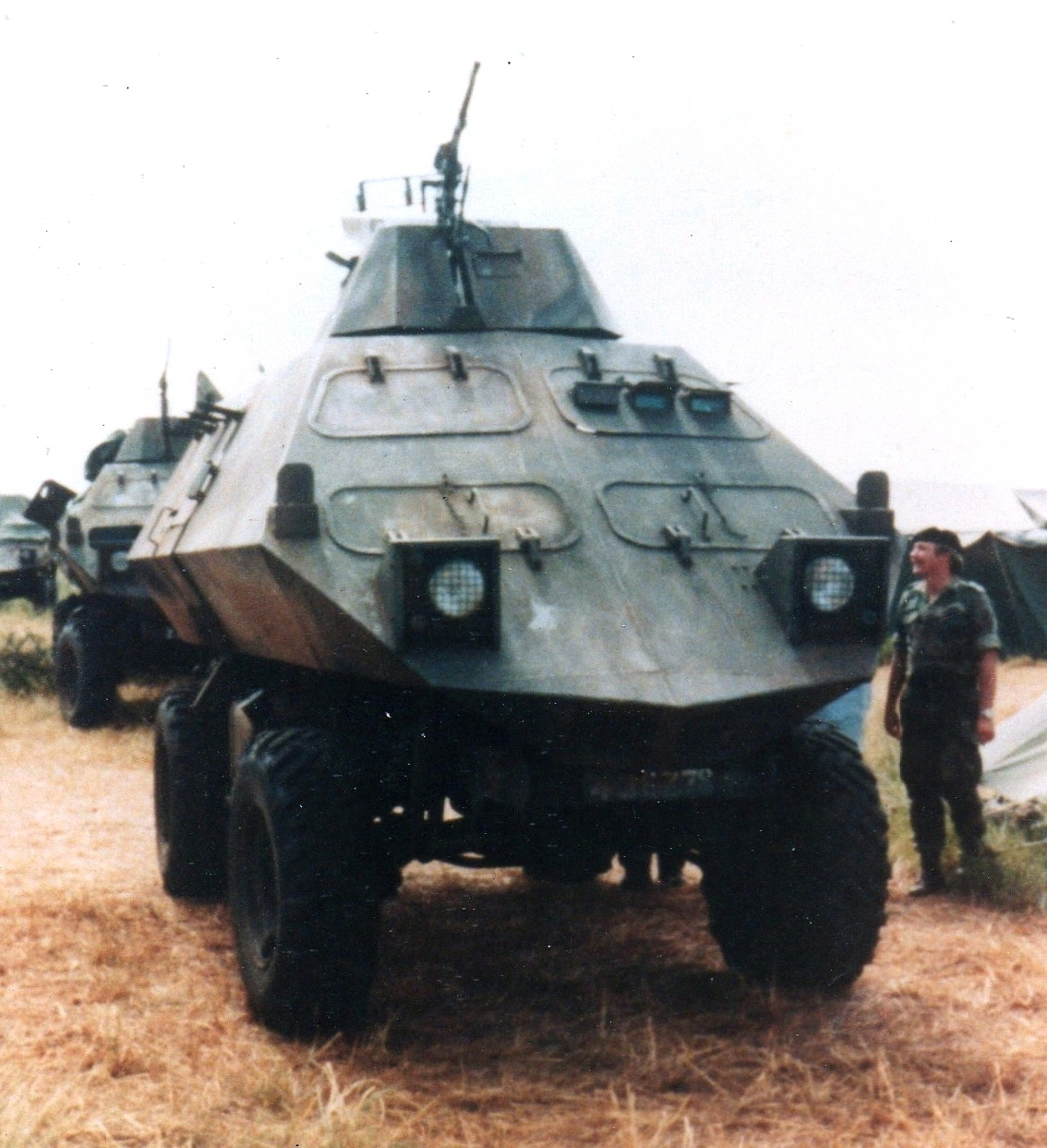
Mine Protected Combat Vehicle of the ZNA in 1980.

At its formation in 1980, the ZNA was overburdened with a surplus of arms due to having inherited the inventories of the former Rhodesian Army as well as the two constituent insurgent factions of the Patriotic Front. Especially problematic was the integration of Soviet and Chinese weapons with the Rhodesian NATO standard arms, which had different gauges and calibers. The Zimbabwean government initially ordered that the guerrillas' Soviet or Chinese arms be placed into storage, hoping to simplify maintenance and logistics by re-issuing only former Rhodesian weapons and ammunition. This decision was later overturned when it became clear that the Rhodesian era weapons were insufficient to equip the ZNA, especially after a significant percentage of its 7.62×51mm NATO ammunition stockpiles were destroyed in a sabotage action around 1981. The guerrillas' former arms were brought out of storage and re-issued to individual units, being supplemented by additional supplies of Soviet-style arms from North Korea. Serious logistical difficulties resulted from the use of such a menagerie of disparate equipment within individual battalions, forcing the ZNA to standardize equipment on the battalion and later the brigade level. Unfortunately this resulted in additional problems, such as the use of separate communications equipment in certain brigades which were otherwise incompatible with those of other units.

The People's Republic of China emerged as the ZNA's largest external supplier of arms during the 1980s. Most of the new artillery, tanks, and APCs accepted into service after 1981 were of Chinese origin. Nevertheless, the ZNA continued to look to a number of diverse suppliers to meet its needs, including member states of the European Union and the Commonwealth of Independent States. Domestic production of small arms and ammunition, including multiple rocket launchers, small arms ammunition, artillery shells, and hand grenades, commenced for the ZNA in the mid-1980s through Zimbabwe Defence Industries (ZDI).

The operational readiness and serviceability rate of the army's weapons systems began undergoing a decline during the Second Congo War, due to an inability to source new parts and ammunition at a pace sufficient to keep up with wartime wear. Development loans to the Zimbabwean government by the World Bank and the International Monetary Fund were suspended when the ZNA was accused of diverting the money into the war effort. The ZNA was also badly affected by a subsequent arms embargo imposed by the EU due to allegations of human rights abuses. One consequence of the embargo was that the ZNA was forced to retire much of its technical equipment, namely radios, of Western origin. The logistics problem was further exacerbated during the collapse of the Zimbabwean dollar against major world currencies, which led to further budgetary restraints. Over half the army's tanks and armoured vehicles were rendered unserviceable due to a lack of funds to source spare parts, fuel, or training ammunition. To raise funds, the ZNA was forced to auction off much of its trailers, ammunition trucks, and engineering vehicles. Army ammunition continued to be sourced from ZDI, but the latter suspended operations in 2015 when the ZNA defaulted on its payments.

In February 2017, Zimbabwean officials revealed that the ZNA was heavily in debt with Chinese creditors due to defaulting on payments for Chinese arms. The government granted a number of domestic platinum claims to a Chinese defence contractor, Norinco, to help cover the existing debt.

=== Small arms ===
Weapon	Type	Origin	Photo	Notes
Pistols
Browning Hi-Power	Semi-automatic pistol	Belgium		
TT pistol	Semi-automatic pistol	Soviet Union		
Submachine guns
PPSh-41	Submachine gun	Soviet Union		
Sterling	Submachine gun	United Kingdom		
Uzi	Submachine gun	Israel		Some manufactured under licence.
Rifles
Type 56 carbine	Semi-automatic rifle	China		
AK-47	Assault rifle	Soviet Union		Standard service rifle of the ZNA.
AKM	Assault rifle	Soviet Union		
Type 56 assault rifle	Assault rifle	China		
FN FAL	Battle rifle	Belgium		Used by special forces.
Heckler & Koch G3	Battle rifle	Germany		
Dragunov SVD	Sniper rifle	Soviet Union		
Machine guns
RPD	Light machine gun	Soviet Union		
RPK	Light machine gun	Soviet Union		
FN MAG	General-purpose machine gun	Belgium		
Ultimax 100	Squad Automatic Weapon	Singapore		
PK	Medium machine gun	Soviet Union		Standard squad automatic weapon.
Browning M2	Heavy machine gun	United States		
SG-43 Goryunov	Medium machine gun	Soviet Union		

=== Heavy weapons ===
Weapon	Type	Origin	Notes
Anti-tank
M20	Recoilless rifle	United States	Superseded the M40 in ZNA service in 1980.
B-11	Recoilless rifle	Soviet Union	
Type 69	Rocket-propelled grenade	China	
RPG-7	Rocket-propelled grenade	Soviet Union	Standard platoon anti-tank weapon.
HJ-8	Anti-tank guided missile	China	
Air defence
ZU-23-2	Anti-aircraft gun	Soviet Union	45 in service.
61-K	Anti-aircraft gun	Soviet Union	39 in service.
ZPU	Anti-aircraft gun	Soviet Union	36 ZPU-1, ZPU-2, and ZPU-4 in service.
9K38 Igla	Surface-to-air missile	Soviet Union	
9K32 Strela-2	Surface-to-air missile	Soviet Union	Up to 200 in storage.
Artillery
Type 60	Field gun	China	18 in service.
Type 54	Howitzer	China	12 in service.
D-30	Howitzer	Soviet Union	4 in service.
Ordnance QF 25-pounder	Howitzer	United Kingdom	18 in service.
BL 5.5-inch Medium Gun	Medium gun	United Kingdom	8 in service.
ZiS-3	Field gun	Soviet Union	34 in service. Relegated to ceremonial roles.
Type 63	Multiple rocket launcher	China / North Korea	16—18 in service. Acquired from North Korea.
RM-70	Multiple rocket launcher	Czechoslovakia	6 operational; 58 may have once been in service.
120-PM-43	Heavy mortar	Soviet Union	4 in service.
82-BM-37	Infantry mortar	Soviet Union	200 in service.
L16	Infantry mortar	United Kingdom	

=== Vehicles ===
Vehicle	Type	Origin	Number	Notes
Tanks
Type 59	Main battle tank	China	30	
Type 69	Main battle tank	China	10	
T-54/55	Main battle tank	Soviet Union	20	Status uncertain.
Armoured cars
EE-9 Cascavel	Armoured car	Brazil	80	Refurbished in 2014.
Eland	Armoured car	South Africa	20 in service	
Ferret	Scout car	United Kingdom	15 in service	
Armoured personnel carriers
Type 63	APC	China	30 in service	
VTT-323	APC	China	22 in service	
Type 89	APC	People's Republic of China		In service as of 2017.
ACMAT TPK 420 BL	APC	France	55 in service	
UR-416	APC	West Germany / Rhodesia	14 in service	Unlicensed variant produced locally.
EE-11 Urutu	APC	Brazil	7 in service	
Crocodile	MRAP	Rhodesia	50–60 in service	
Mine Protected Combat Vehicle	MRAP	Rhodesia		In service as of 2017.
Military light utility vehicles
Dongfeng EQ2050	Utility vehicle	China	300 in service	
Mazda T35	Transport truck	Japan		
Mazda B1800	Light truck	Japan		

== See also ==
- Central Intelligence Organisation
- Ministry of Defence (Zimbabwe)
- National Youth Service (Zimbabwe)
- Zimbabwe Defence Industries
- Rhodesian Security Forces
- Special Forces of Zimbabwe
- Zimbabwean Fifth Brigade
- Zimbabwe Republic Police

== Bibliography ==
- Zimbabwe
- ZNA Demonstrates ATGM
- MILITARISATION OF ZIMBABWE: Does the opposition stand a chance?
- Alao, Abiodun, "Mugabe and the Politics and Diplomacy of Security in Zimbabwe"
- Alao, Abiodun (1995) The Metamorphosis of the ‘Unorthodox’: The Integration and Early Development of the Zimbabwean National Army. In: Bhebe, N. & Ranger, T. (eds) Soldiers in Zimbabwe's Liberation War. Volume 1. University of Zimbabwe Publications, Harare: 104–117. ISBN 0-908307-36-5
- Binda, A. (2007) Masoja: The History of the Rhodesian African Rifles and its Forerunner, the Rhodesia Native Regiment. Thirty Degrees South Publishers Pty Ltd, Johannesburg.
- Chitiyo, K. & Rupiya, M. (2005) Tracking Zimbabwe's political history: the Zimbabwe Defence Force from 1980 to 2005. In: Rupiya, M. (ed.) Evolutions and Revolutions: A Contemporary History of Militaries in Southern Africa. Institute for Security Studies, Pretoria: 331–363. ISBN 1-919913-82-3
- Cooper, Tom (2013) Africa@War Volume 14: Great Lakes Conflagration – The Second Congo War, 1998–2003. Helion & Co Ltd, England, and Thirty Degrees South Publishers Pty Ltd, Johannesburg.
- Gangarosa, Gene Jr. (2001). Heckler & Koch—Armorers of the Free World. Maryland: Stoeger Publishing. ISBN 0-88317-229-1.
- International Institute for Strategic Studies (15 February 2019). The Military Balance 2019. London: Routledge. ISBN 9781857439885.
- Godfrey Maringira, "Politicization and resistance in the Zimbabwean national army," African Affairs, Volume 116, Issue 462, 1 January 2017, Pages 18–38, doi:10.1093/afraf/adw055.
- Rupiah, Martin, Lt. Col. (1995) Peacekeeping operations: The Zimbabwean experience. In: Shaw, M. & Celliers, J. (eds), South Africa and Peacekeeping in Africa, Volume 1. Institute for Defence Policy, Halfway House, South Africa: 111–125.
