= Presidential Guard (Zimbabwe) =

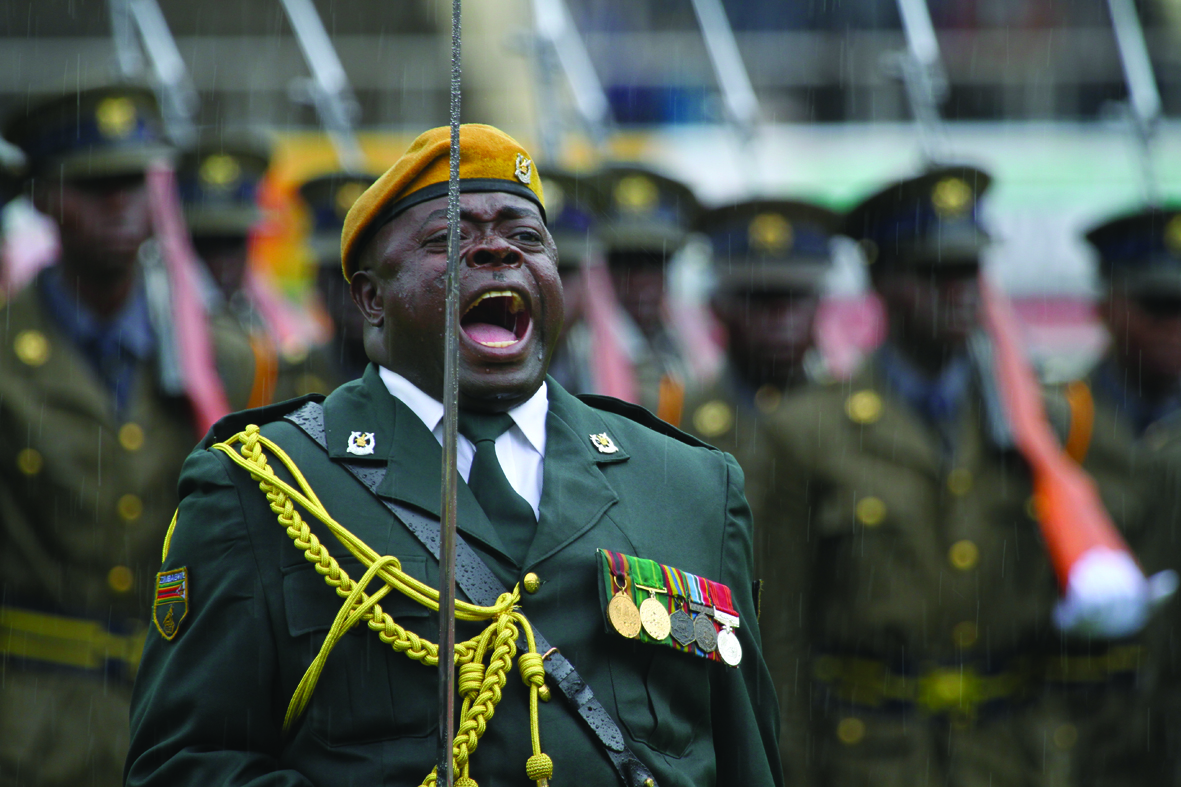
- An officer of the Presidential Guard giving military commands during an Independence Day military parade.
- Active: 4 November 1983; 42 years ago
- Country: Zimbabwe
- Allegiance: President of Zimbabwe
- Branch: Zimbabwe National Army
- Type: Combat Unit; Honor Guard
- Role: Protection of the President of Zimbabwe
- Size: Brigade (2 battalions)
- Headquarters: Dzivarasekwa Barracks, Harare
- Anniversaries: Defence Forces Day

Commanders
- Current commander: Brigadier General Fidelis Mhonda
- Ceremonial chief: President Emmerson Mnangagwa
- Notable commanders: Ambrose Gunda; Major General Anselem Sanyatwe

The Presidential Guard (PG) of the Zimbabwe National Army is an elite unit responsible for protecting the President of Zimbabwe. It is one of eight brigade-sized formations and two district commands in the ZNA. The members of the unit, some of which are from neighboring states such as Angola, provide presidential protection and also perform ceremonial duties in the national capital.

== History ==
The Presidential Guard was created by Robert Mugabe in November 1983 following two attempts on his life during the election campaign. In early 2014, ZNA ordered the PG to look for alternative accommodation from Dzivarasekwa in an attempt to reduce the number of army personnel at its barracks and the costs of maintaining its facilities.

Colour Sergeant Stanley Mugunzva of the PG, who was assigned to Vice-President Constantino Chiwenga, was one of two killed in the 2018 Bulawayo bombing, which was an attempt on President Emmerson Mnangagwa's life.

Members of PG escorted the coffin of former President Mugabe upon its arrival in Harare International Airport following his death in Singapore in the latter half of the summer of 2019.

=== 2017 Coup ===
During the 2017 Zimbabwean coup d'état, President Mugabe ordered tanks to surround the Presidential Guard barracks across the capital. As a result, then Brigadier General Anselem Nhamo Sanyatwe secretly renounced his allegiance to Mugabe and replaced loyal troops with substitutes handpicked by Sanyatwe.

Unaware of this shift, Mugabe left his headquarters en route to his residence, during which his convoy was attacked by two army trucks carrying fifteen armed members of the PG, with their faces concealed by black masks. Those same soldiers disarmed the Central Intelligence Organisation agents with Mugabe at the time and put them under arrest.

Sanyatwe retired in February 2019 and was appointed as the ambassador to Tanzania.

== Structure ==
The brigade is organized into the following units located in Harare:

- 1 Presidential Guard Battalion - based at the State House (nicknamed the State House Battalion)
- 2 Presidential Guard Battalion - based at Dzivarasekwa Barracks

The brigade headquarters is based currently at Dzivarasekwa Barracks in Harare and is led by Brigadier General Fidelis Mhonda.

== Duties ==
In its current role, it serves as a Household Division-like service for the President of Zimbabwe. It is primarily responsible for guarding the area around State House, which is the presidential residence.

It also mounts the guard of honour on behalf of the Zimbabwe Defence Forces during events of state. Events where the guard of honour provided by the PG includes Defence Forces Day festivities, Heroes` Day, the Independence Day Parade, and the Opening of Parliament. More recently, it mounted the guard of honour during the Inauguration of Emmerson Mnangagwa.

Some of the state arrival ceremonies during state visits the PG has provided guards of honour for have included those for Chinese President Xi Jinping and Tanzanian President John Magufuli.

== Characteristics ==
=== Uniform ===
The unit wear their yellow berets to tell them apart from the rest of the Zimbabwean military. The mounted element of the unit parades in Pith helmet as headgear.

=== Flag ===
The flag of the Presidential Guard of Zimbabwe consists of a beige background, with three equal horizontal stripes of red, green and red, and the centre having a shield which contains a white wreath beneath a bird, over which are two brown rifles in saltire.

== Controversies ==
- Lieutenant Colonel Samson Murombo, the commander of 1 Presidential Guard Battalion, was sidelined from commanding the Defence Forces Day Parade as a result of a fallout with First Lady Auxillia Mnangagwa. In leaked audio, Mnangagwa accused Murombo of spying on her amid tensions between her husband and sections of the military. She also challenged him to a physical showdown and later broke down pleading for him to spare her life. Murombo would later be dismissed from his position in January 2020.
- There were reports of Presidential Guards participating in the violence that resulted from the 2018 Zimbabwean general election. This came despite reported presidential orders for military personnel to not be on the streets during this period. A year after the shootings, the United States Department of State publicly sanctioned Major General (Retired) Anselem Nhamo Sanyatwe and his spouse.
- A Presidential Guard, identified as "Private Mugadu", fired 30 shots into the air at the presidential residence before being apprehended as he was about to reload his gun. This incident resulted in the suspension of Lieutenant Colonel Murombo from his post.
- A member of the Presidential Guard was accused of stealing 119 laptops and three desktop computers belonging to former President Robert Mugabe. The soldier was cleared on the unlawful entry charge, and was fined 200 dollars for possessing stolen property.
- In 2017, a group of guardsmen allegedly convinced a gang of armed robbers, who broke into a businessman's residence, to surrender $91,000 USD under the guise of Operation Restore Legacy.
- Three high-ranking members of the PG as well as former ZBC anchor Musorowegomo Mukosi allegedly assaulted 15 villagers and forcefully tried to take the Chin gold mine in Mount Darwin. All four were later granted a bail of 500 dollars each.

== See also ==
- National Ceremonial Guard
- Rhodesian African Rifles
