= Chief of Defence (disambiguation) =

The chief of defence is the highest ranked commissioned officer of a nation's armed forces.

Chief of Defence may also refer to:

- Chief of Defence (Belgium)
- Chief of the Defence (Bulgaria)
- Chief of Defence (Denmark)
- Chief of Defence (Finland)
- Chief of Defence (Lithuania)
- Chief of Defence (Luxembourg)
- Chief of Defence (Netherlands)
- Chief of Defence (Norway)
- Chief of Defense (Zimbabwe)
