= Emmanuel Matatu =

Zimbabwean Commander Defence Forces

General Emmanuel Matatu

Commander of the Zimbabwe Defence Forces
- Incumbent
- Assumed office 21 November 2025
- President: Emmerson Mnangagwa
- Preceded by: Philip Valerio Sibanda

Commander of the Zimbabwe National Army
- In office 27 March 2025 – 21 November 2025
- President: Emmerson Mnangagwa
- Preceded by: Anselem Nhamo Sanyatwe
- Succeeded by: Asher Walter Tapfumaneyi

Chief of Staff of administrative staff
- In office 30 July 2021 – 27 March 2025
- President: Emmerson Mnangagwa

Personal details
- Born: 1959 Midlands,Southern Rhodesia,Federation of Rhodesia and Nyasaland
- Party: ZANU–PF
- Education: Thekwane High School
- Profession: Senior Military Commander

Military service
- Allegiance: ZIPRA; Zimbabwe National Army
- Branch/service: Zimbabwe National Army
- Years of service: 1976 - present
- Rank: General
- Battles/wars: Second Congo War

Emmanuel Matatu (born 10 February 1959) is a Zimbabwean General and Commander of the Zimbabwe National Army (ZNA). On 19 November 2025, President Emmerson Mnangagwa appointed him Commander of the Zimbabwe Defence Forces effective from 21 November 2025. He was formerly the Chief of Staff of the Army's administration staff.

Matatu grew up in Midlands Province and attended boarding school at Thekwane High School north of Plumtree. In the 1970s, as a young man he joined the Zimbabwe People's Republic Army (ZIPRA) training as a guerrilla in Mwembeshi, Zambia. Based on frontline combat experience, Matatu was selected for the officer’s course at the Zambia Military Academy at Kohima, where he performed exceptionally well.

In 2001, President Mugabe promoted Matatu to Brigadier General. Thereafter he was appointed as Deputy Coordinator of the Zimbabwe National Defence University.

In August 2021, he was promoted to Major General by President Emmerson Mnangagwa. At that time he moved into the Army Headquarters as the Chief of Staff of the Army's administration staff.

In March 2025, Matatu was promoted by President Mnangagwa to the rank of Lieutenant General, and put in charge of the National Army. He replaced Lieutenant General Anselem Nhamo Sanyatwe who was appointed as the new Minister of Sport, Arts and Culture, taking over from Kirsty Coventry, following her election as President of the International Olympic Committee.
