= Emily Jesaya =

Zimbabwean politician

The Hon. Emily Jesaya MP

Deputy Minister of Sports, Recreation, Arts and Culture
- Incumbent
- Assumed office 12 September 2023
- President: Emmerson Mnangagwa
- Minister: Kirsty Coventry (2023-2025); Anselem Nhamo Sanyatwe
- Preceded by: Tinoda Machakaire

Member of Parliament for the Mashonaland East Women's Quota
- Incumbent
- Assumed office 4 September 2023

Personal details
- Born: 9 March 1993 (age 33) Bulawayo, Zimbabwe
- Party: ZANU–PF
- Education: Midlands State University

Emily Jesaya is a Zimbabwean politician. She is the current Deputy Minister of Sports, Recreation, Arts and Culture of Zimbabwe and a member of parliament. She is a member of ZANU–PF.
