= Dzivarasekwa (constituency) =

Constituency in Zimbabwe

- National Assembly constituency for the Parliament of Zimbabwe
- District: Harare
- Province: Harare
- Electorate: 37,162 (2023)

Current constituency
- Number of members: 1
- Party: Citizens Coalition for Change
- Member: Edwin Mushoriwa

Dzivarasekwa is a constituency represented in the National Assembly of the Parliament of Zimbabwe. It is located primarily in the Dzivarasekwa suburb in the western part of Harare and covers the traditional territory and land beyond Dzivarasekwa river commonly known as Dzivarasekwa Extension. It is home to Dzivarasekwa Barracks, which houses the Presidential Guard. It is currently represented since 2018 by Edwin Mushoriwa of the Citizens Coalition for Change (previously of the Movement for Democratic Change Alliance).

== See also ==
- List of Zimbabwean parliamentary constituencies
