= Edzai Chimonyo =

Zimbabwean military officer (1952–2021)

- Born: Edzai Absolom Chakanyuka Chimonyo; November 7, 1952; Harare, Zimbabwe
- Died: July 8, 2021 (aged 68)
- Military career
- Allegiance: Zimbabwe
- Branch: Zimbabwe National Army
- Service years: 1970–2021
- Rank: Lieutenant General
Military offices
Preceded by Lieutenant General Philip Valerio Sibanda	Commander of the Zimbabwe National Army; 2017–2021	Succeeded by Lieutenant General David Sigauke

Lieutenant General Edzai Absolom Chakanyuka Chimonyo (November 7, 1952 – July 8, 2021) was a Zimbabwean military officer and Commander of the Zimbabwe National Army from December 2017 to July 2021.

== Career ==
On December 18, 2017, Major General Edzai Chimonyo was promoted to the rank of Lieutenant General and was also appointed Commander of the Zimbabwe National Army. He served in this role until his death in July 2021 and was succeeded by Major General David Sigauke.

== Death ==
In December, 2020, Lieutenant General Chimonyo was flown to India for medical treatment to cancer and lung complications. On July, 8, 2021, he died of cancer at the age of 68.
