= Operation Turkey =

Rhodesian government food control campaign

- Part of the Rhodesian Bush War
- Planned by: Rhodesian government
- Commanded by: Rhodesian Security Forces
- Objective: To deny nationalist forces access to food
- Date: January 1977 - early 1980
- Outcome: Worsened food supply for civilians, contributed to widespread malnutrition Minor hinderance to nationalist forces but placed political pressure on their leaders

Operation Turkey was a campaign conducted by the Rhodesian government during the last years of the Rhodesian Bush War that sought to prevent the nationalist guerrilla forces from accessing food. The operation began in January 1977 and involved strict restrictions on the amount of food black Rhodesians could access. The Rhodesian Security Forces also destroyed food supplies and storage facilities. These tactics put pressure on the nationalists but also contributed to widespread malnutrition.

== Background ==
Rhodesia was a state in southern Africa in which a small white minority ruled over a much larger black population. In 1965 the government declared independence from the United Kingdom rather than accept a transition to majority rule. This sparked the Rhodesian Bush War, in which nationalist forces attempted to end white rule. The security situation for the Rhodesian government deteriorated sharply from 1975, leading it to adopt harsh and unconventional tactics.

The government began forcing civilians in many rural areas of the state to relocate to protected villages from late 1973. This aimed to separate them from the guerrillas who were operating within Rhodesia, including to prevent the provision of food and intelligence. Approximately three quarters of a million people were eventually required to relocate to 220 villages. This led to a drop in food production as the villages were often located a lengthy distance from the fields the civilians grew food in and the time they could spend working on their fields was limited by a strictly enforced curfew. The civilians were also unable to protect the fields from animals while they were in the villages. The resultant food shortages caused a substantial increase in deaths from starvation. More broadly, by the mid-1970s Rhodesia's food supply was erratic.

The nationalist guerrillas operating within Rhodesia sourced food from the local black population. As a result of the relocation of many civilians to protected villages and a drought, guerrillas operating in some areas began to obtain food from the workers on white-owned farms.

== Food control ==
During 1976 the Rhodesian government's intelligence services determined that Zimbabwe African National Liberation Army personnel were sourcing food from black workers on white-owned farms. In response, the government decided to further control the food supply beyond the effects of the protected village program.

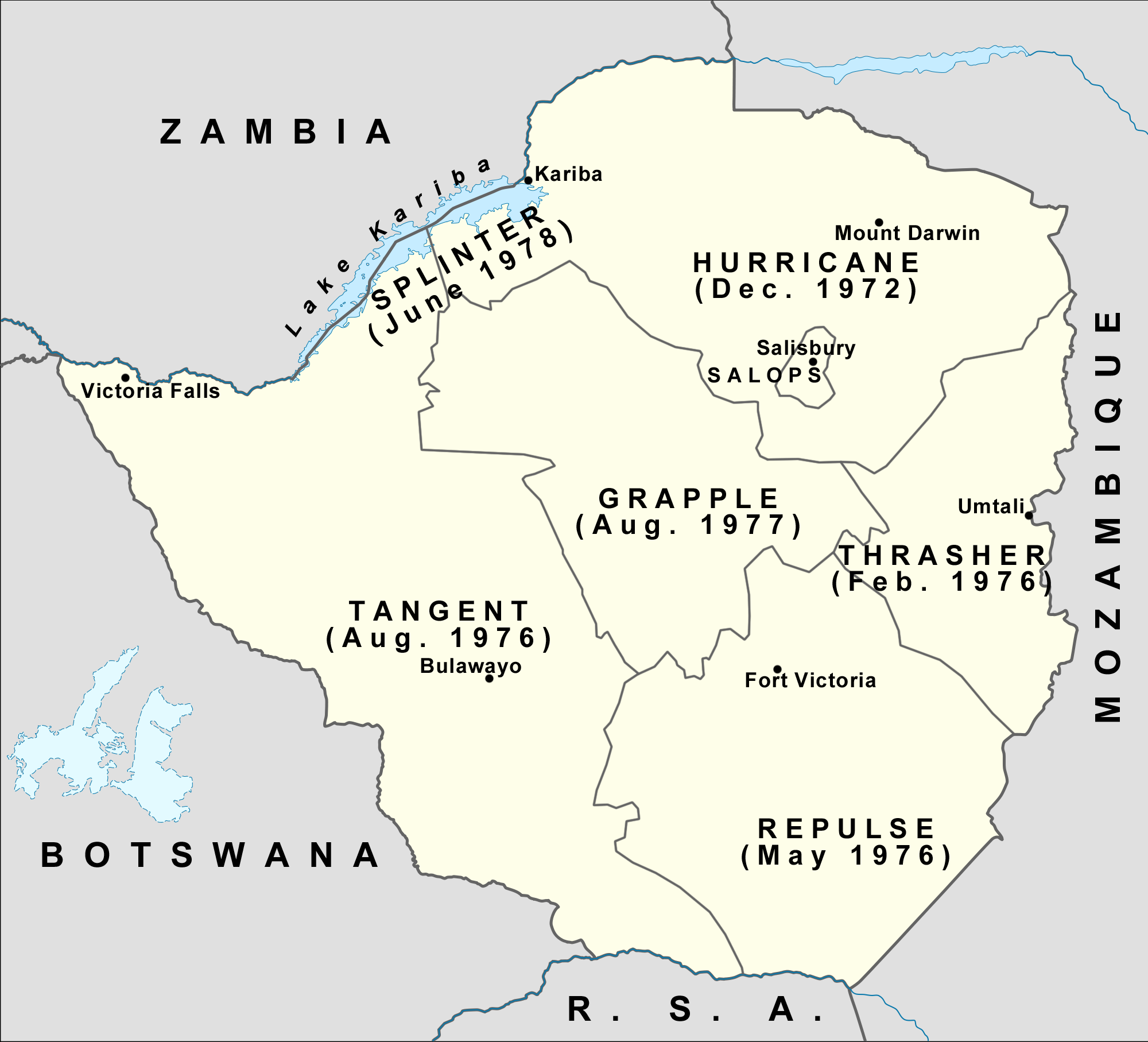
Rhodesian operational areas. The Operation Turkey restrictions were first applied in the Operation Hurricane area, and later applied to other areas

The goal of Operation Turkey was to limit the amount of food available to the population in rural areas of Rhodesia to only the amount required for their survival. The government hoped that this would make it impossible for guerrillas to access food.

As part of Operation Turkey, farmers were only allowed to provide black labourers with a day's worth of food at a time. Ration cards were also issued. Rhodesian forces were authorised to destroy food, livestock, housing and other property of people that were suspected of assisting the guerrillas. Grain stores used by the rest of the population were destroyed or left with only a small amount of stock. Many shops selling food were forced to close, and those that remained were often too far from residents in nearby protected villages to be able to travel between before the daily curfew began. In some areas residents of protected villages needed to obtain permission from the district commissioner before they could buy food.

Restrictions on moving food around Rhodesia were introduced. People entering protected districts could carry no more than 10 kilograms of grain or equivalent. Checkpoints were established to enforce this, with confiscated food being destroyed. Meat was successfully smuggled between districts, which contributed to the spread of a large anthrax outbreak.

The Rhodesian Security Forces were empowered to apply these measures in the 90 percent of the state that was subject to martial law. They came into effect on 28 January 1977 and were eventually designated Operation Turkey. The Operation Turkey restrictions were initially applied to the Operation Hurricane operational area, in the north of Rhodesia, and were later extended to other areas.

The pro-government forces leveraged the food shortages to attract support. During December 1977 and January 1978 the government offered all guerrillas within Rhodesia 'safe return' (the ability to surrender, but not amnesty from prosecution) in the belief that their morale was low due to food shortages arising from Operation Turkey and the protected village program. Few took up this offer. As part of the 1979 Rhodesian general election supporters of Abel Muzorewa offered black voters sacks of maize in return for voting for their candidates. The Security Force Auxiliaries, which were private armies loyal to pro-government political parties, also used food in this way.

During the period in which Operation Turkey was in effect, the Rhodesian government provided white farmers with assistance to produce maize and cattle. These foodstuffs were also produced by black peasants, and the government support gave white farmers an advantage over them.

== Results ==
The effectiveness of the Operation Turkey measures were constrained by the government's limited administrative capacities and increasingly weak control over the black population. In many areas government forces were inadequate to stop people from travelling to buy food. The government was also unable to rapidly roll out an identification card system that was necessary to prevent people from moving between areas to obtain food.

Food control was most effective in areas where crops were grown, but was dependent on cooperation from white farmers in these districts. The measures were less effective in cattle farming areas. Operation Turkey made it almost impossible for peasants to sell food in the formal market. The food control strategy initially hindered guerrilla units, but they soon learned how to circumvent the restrictions by sourcing food from areas distant from protected villages. The government's control over protected villages also deteriorated over time, allowing the guerrillas to obtain food from their residents.

Operation Turkey worsened the already inadequate supply of food in Rhodesia. Other factors affecting the food supply at this time were the breakdown in government services due to the war, the anthrax outbreak and a drought. In late 1979 the International Red Cross estimated that between 13 and 29 percent of Rhodesians were malnourished.

The food shortages put pressure on the nationalist leaders to end the war in the negotiations that led to the Lancaster House Agreement through which Rhodesia transitioned to majority rule and independence as Zimbabwe. The effects of Operation Turkey continued to constrain Zimbabwe's food supply in the years immediately after independence, due to the lack of food storage facilities and the disruptions to agricultural production.

During 1984 the Zimbabwean Army's 5th Brigade used tactics similar to those employed under Operation Turkey during the gukurahundi campaign in the Matabeleland region. Soldiers blocked or tightly controlled all supplies of food into the region and a curfew was imposed. Civilians were only issued small rations of food, which they had to eat while being supervised by the military. This led to starvation.
