= Kamativi =

Coordinates: 18°32′S 27°07′E

Kamativi is a small mining town in Matabeleland North province, Zimbabwe. The Kamativi tin mine is located next to the town, is the reason for the town's extistance, and gave the town its name. The name Kamativi is derived from the word "mativi" which means "sides", "embankments" or "valleys", with the diminutive prefix "ka" - though not grammatically correct - makes the name "little valleys".

== History ==
In the years around 1800 AD the local Namibia and Tonga people are believed to have used this region as a trade centre for salt and fish to the visiting Rozvi people from the North and Nguni people from the South, then later with the Portuguese missionaries.

== Location ==
Kamativi is located 28 km off the Bulawayo to Victoria Falls Road along Binga Road. There are three schools in the area: Kamativi Primary, St. Theresa Primary and Kamativi Secondary.
