= 5th Brigade (Zimbabwe) =

Zimbabwe National Army unit

- Active: 1981–present
- Country: Zimbabwe
- Branch: Zimbabwe National Army
- Type: Infantry brigade
- Role: Counter-insurgency
- Size: Brigade
- Garrison/HQ: Gweru, Zimbabwe
- Nickname: Gukurahundi
- Engagements: Gukurahundi campaign Mozambican Civil War

Commanders
- Notable commanders: Perrance Shiri

The 5th Brigade is an infantry brigade of the Zimbabwe National Army (ZNA). The 5th Brigade was created in 1981 from three former battalions of the Zimbabwe African National Liberation Army (ZANLA). It later incorporated over 3,000 ex-ZANLA guerrillas from various units. The brigade was based in Gweru and participated in the Mozambican Civil War as well as a genocide known as the Gukurahundi which targeted Ndebele civilians and Zimbabwe People's Revolutionary Army (ZIPRA) guerrillas.

The 5th Brigade was reactivated in 2006 following a prolonged period of inactivity.

== Organization ==
The 5th Brigade was subordinate only to the Chief of the Zimbabwe National Army. In 1983, it consisted of five infantry battalions as well as an armoured company equipped with T-54 tanks. The brigade was at least partly mechanised and possessed a number of BTR-152 armoured personnel carriers.

== History ==
The Zimbabwe National Army (ZNA) was created in 1980 through the amalgamation of the former Rhodesian Army with the militant wings of two rival guerrilla organisations: the Zimbabwe African National Liberation Army (ZANLA) and the Zimbabwe People's Revolutionary Army (ZIPRA). To ease the integration process, large numbers of former Rhodesian servicemen and guerrillas were demobilised and the remaining troops interspersed throughout new units. By 1981, the bulk of the ZNA's manpower was concentrated in thirty-seven new light infantry battalions composed of about 37,000 personnel, almost all of whom were former ZANLA and ZIPRA guerrillas. The battalions were to be trained by a combination of British and former Rhodesian military instructors. Guerrillas from both sides resisted integration by establishing separate camps.

The infantry battalions were almost immediately wracked by inter-factional skirmishes in 1980 and again in 1981. Zimbabwean prime minister Robert Mugabe and his government responded by disbanding three battalions and reorganising the remainder into four brigades. All former guerrillas awaiting integration with their new units were to be disarmed en masse. Upon learning of this policy, some former ZIPRA personnel began to desert the army, taking their weapons with them. They complained that the disarmament campaign targeted them unfairly and was being used to buttress the military influence of ex-ZANLA troops at their expense. Mutinies by ZIPRA elements in the ZNA became notorious. In 1982 there were several hundred disgruntled and otherwise unemployed ZIPRA fighters at large in the provinces of Matabeleland South and Matabeleland North, many of whom had resorted to armed banditry. The Zimbabwean government referred to the ex-ZIPRA deserters simply as "dissidents".

In the wake of escalating dissident activity, Mugabe announced his intention to form a fifth infantry brigade composed solely of ex-ZANLA troops. In August 1981, two existing ZANLA battalions and an additional 3,000 ZANLA guerrillas from various units were selected for training in the new 5th Brigade. The officers were largely drawn from ex-ZANLA officer candidates whose poor educational qualifications had resulted in their failing standardised officer school. A smaller number of ex-ZIPRA officers from 4th Brigade were also transferred to the 5th Brigade to serve in various technical and specialist roles.

Unlike the ZNA's other four brigades, this unit was to be armed and trained by a special North Korean military mission, which was chosen to train the newly-formed brigade because of Mugabe's admiration for North Korea's dictatorial regime. The 5th Brigade was not structured for conventional military operations but rather as a specialized counter-insurgency unit. Ex-ZIPRA and Rhodesian troops resented the brigade for its apparent exclusiveness and the fact that it was permitted to operate independently from the ZNA's normal command structure, being subordinate only to the Chief of the Army. The 5th Brigade was trained from August 1981, when the first North Korean military advisers arrived in Zimbabwe, to June 1982 at Inyanga, an isolated mountain base near the Zimbabwean-Mozambican border. It was then moved to its permanent base in Gweru.

At the time of its formation, the 5th Brigade was the ZNA's only mechanised infantry brigade, and most of its arsenal—including T-54 tanks, BTR-152 armoured personnel carriers, BRDM-2 scout cars, towed anti-tank artillery, and multiple rocket launchers, far exceeded the capabilities of ground weapons in the other four brigades' inventories. However, serious practical difficulties also resulted in the brigade's use of unique codes and radio equipment which were otherwise incompatible with those of other army units.

=== Mozambican Civil War ===
The 5th Brigade was one of the first ZNA units to be deployed into Mozambique during the Mozambican Civil War. In mid-1982 the brigade was deployed to defend a strategic rail line from Beira to the Zimbabwean border from sabotage attempts by the Mozambican National Resistance (RENAMO). Counteroffensives against RENAMO were jointly planned at the command level by Zimbabwean, Mozambican, and North Korean officers.

=== Tensions with ex-ZIPRA forces ===
The 5th Brigade's independent nature soon placed it at sometimes violent odds with other brigades of the ZNA. In September 1982, some of its personnel fired on ex-ZIPRA troops serving in the 4th Brigade. This prompted a mass exodus of former ZIPRA personnel from 4th Brigade, which was forced to disband four of its battalions due to the loss of personnel to desertion.

In December 1982, the 5th Brigade dismissed all its ex-ZIPRA officers. Ex-ZIPRA personnel accused the 5th Brigade of purposefully instigating tensions between the factional elements in the other four brigades.

=== Anti-dissident genocide ===
In January 1983 the 5th Brigade was deployed into Matabeleland North with the objective of eliminating the local dissidents. Its anti-dissident campaign was known simply as Gukurahundi, a Shona language term defined as "the rain which blows away the chaff before spring". The word had also been applied to ZANLA mobilization tactics during the Rhodesian Bush War in 1979. Prime Minister Mugabe had bestowed the nickname Gukurahundi to the brigade in December 1982 and it figured prominently in the 5th Brigade's emblems and standards.

The Zimbabwean government provided the 5th Brigade with meticulous records of ex-ZIPRA deserters and demobilized ZIPRA personnel, who were to be detained for questioning. While the brigade's directives specified a search for ex-ZIPRA guerrillas, it failed to differentiate between those affiliated with ZIPRA and the same movement's political wing, the Zimbabwe African People's Union (ZAPU). Prior to the deployment, this attitude had been reinforced by the alleged discovery of arms on several ZAPU properties, leading to the mass dismissal of ZAPU officials from the government and the arrest of senior ex-ZIPRA army officers. In March 1983, 5th Brigade troops ransacked the home of ZAPU chairman Joshua Nkomo, shooting three of his domestic staff during the raid. The 5th Brigade's commander, Perrance Shiri, perceived all ex-ZIPRA troops, including those employed in the civil service or the ZNA, as potential dissidents. Detention by the 5th Brigade was arbitrary and extrajudicial killings of ZIPRA veterans became frequent.

The 5th Brigade imposed a curfew in Matabeleland North, banned the movement of civilians within the operational area, and closed the majority of local businesses. Its constituent battalions rounded up all the residents of a specific district and marched them to central locations, where they were collectively interrogated on dissident activity. The 5th Brigade also conducted house to house searches in Bulawayo for deserters and arms caches. In an attempt to isolate the civilian population from the dissidents, the brigade relocated a number of rural dwellers to police outposts, mining compounds, and old Rhodesian military bases repurposed into makeshift detention camps. Conditions in the camps quickly deteriorated due to overcrowded and inadequate facilities.

The 5th Brigade's activities in the Matabeleland region also involved imposing tight controls over access to food. Soldiers blocked or tightly controlled all supplies of food into the region. Civilians were only issued small rations of food, which they had to eat while being supervised by the military. This led to starvation. These tactics were similar to those used by the Rhodesian government in the last years of the Rhodesian Bush War during Operation Turkey.

== Allegations of politicisation ==
The 5th Brigade has been frequently criticised for its apparent political nature. Responding to an inquiry about North Korea's role in the unit's formation, then-Prime Minister Mugabe simply stated that "they were trained by the North Koreans because we wanted one arm of the army to have a political orientation which stems from our philosophy as ZANU-PF". Zimbabwean Minister of Home Affairs and chief opposition figure Joshua Nkomo denounced the formation of the 5th Brigade as being politically motivated; he believed Mugabe was using the unit to intimidate his opponents and secure the forcible implementation of a de facto one-party state. Historian Paul Moorcraft claimed the 5th Brigade was "marked by its fanatical ideological loyalty to Mugabe...[it] was run from the prime minister's office and was answerable only to Mugabe". Another historian and noted sociologist, Ronald Weitzer, found that the 5th Brigade was perceived as being "highly politicised and loyal to the government, poorly led, and palpably anti-Ndebele".
