= Special Forces of Zimbabwe =

Special forces unit of the Zimbabwe National Army

Since their founding in 1980, the Special Forces of Zimbabwe have been deployed in several African conflicts, including the Mozambique Civil War and the Second Congo War.

== Antecedents ==
In 1980 Prime Minister Robert Mugabe declared the integration of Rhodesian Army, which at independence was the existing army, with the two guerilla armies: Zimbabwe African National Liberation Army (ZANLA) and Zimbabwe People's Revolutionary Army (ZIPRA). This meant Rhodesian Special forces were quickly disbanded and refounded. 1 Commando Brigade was created based on the Rhodesian Light Infantry and Rhodesian African Rifles. British advisors refounded the Special Air Service. Special Forces selection and training were taken from the ones used by Rhodesian army Special forces.

The first operation of the new Special Forces lasted from December 5 to 9 in 1984. Operation Lemon comprised elements of 3 Brigade, the Parachute Group and Special Air Service. Special Forces were deployed to Mozambique to protect the Beira Corridor railway link between Zimbabwe and the port of Beira.

== Composition ==
The Zimbabwe National Army includes the following special forces units:

- Combat Divers
- 1 Commando Regiment: Headquartered in Harare
- 1 Parachute Regiment
- Special Air Service; including a boat squadron
- One brown-water counterinsurgency unit in the Zimbabwe Republic Police

== Operations ==
=== Angola ===
Some sources claim Zimbabwean commandos led the final assault on UNITA leading to the eventual killing of Jonas Savimbi. Zimbabwe sent 2,000 troops to help the Angola government end the war.

=== Mozambique ===
Special Forces launched several search and destroy operations against RENAMO guerrillas.

- 5–9 December 1984 the Parachute Group and Special Air Service (SAS) spearheaded Operation Lemon.
- 20 August 1985 in Operation Grapefruit the Parachute Group and One Command Battalion supported 3 Brigade in taking over the MNR Muxamba base.
- 28 August 1985 SAS and Commando Regiment units lead raid on Casa Banana.
- 24 January 1986 in Operation Octopus, Paras and Commandos were dropped near Marromeu to secure the town and the sugar refinery. 27 January 1986 several Para drops were made in support of the operation.

=== Congo ===
Between 1998 and 2002, some 12,000 Zimbabwean troops, including paratroopers and special forces, participated in the First Congo War as part of a contingent sent by Robert Mugabe to protect Laurent-Désiré Kabila. The units suffered substantial losses in battles against rebel troops before they withdrew.

== See also ==
- Special forces of Rhodesia
