= Southern Rhodesia Volunteers =

- Active: 1898–1920
- Country: Company rule in Rhodesia
- Nickname: SRV
- Engagements: Boer War: Siege of Mafeking; Siege of Elands River

The Southern Rhodesia Volunteers was an army regiment active from 1898 to 1920 during the time of the British South Africa Company's rule over Rhodesia. It was the first regiment to be formed in Southern Rhodesia (now Zimbabwe), beginning the process culminating in the emergence of the Zimbabwe National Army.

== History ==
In 1898, the Southern Rhodesia Volunteers was established as a mounted corps supported by cyclists, signallers, and engineers. The Southern Rhodesia Volunteers served alongside the British South Africa Police and various Colonial and British Units.

The Southern Rhodesia Volunteers had two divisions, the Eastern Division based in Salisbury and the Western Division based in Bulawayo.

The Southern Rhodesia Volunteers served in the Boer War and the Siege of Mafeking. After their service in both deployments, they were awarded their first King’s Colour and Regimental Colour. The Southern Rhodesia Volunteers never participated in the First World War, as their territory was represented on the front line by the Rhodesia Regiment.

== See also ==
- Rhodesia Regiment
- Southern Rhodesia in the First World War
