= Edwin Mushoriwa =

Zimbabwean politician

Edwin Mushoriwa is the member for the Dzivarasekwa parliamentary constituency of Zimbabwe, primarily located in the western part of Harare. He is from the Movement for Democratic Change – Tsvangirai.

== See also ==
- Politics of Zimbabwe
