= Ghatnandur train crash =

Train crash incident 2003

The Ghatnandur train crash occurred on 3 January 2003, when a passenger train travelling from Secunderabad to Manmad crashed into the rear end of a heavy goods train near Ambajogai tehsil Ghatnandur in the Indian state of Maharashtra.

== Crash ==
The crash happened in the early morning. The train was supposed to bypass the station on a loop line, but it was not transferred onto this line by the station officers, and so collided with the stationary freight train berthed on the main line. Three carriages were derailed. The driver was killed, but slowed the train before it crashed. Rescue operations were initially carried out by locals, followed by military and emergency services. Most of the trapped and injured people were rescued. The wreckage did not catch fire.

Eighteen passengers were killed instantly, and 41 injured, including several children who were airlifted to hospital in Hyderabad, over 300 km away, by the Indian Air Force.

== Aftermath ==
The rail authorities offered compensation to the victims and families of victims, with amounts based on a sliding scale according to the severity of the injury.

The station officials realised their mistake and fled, remaining in hiding for many days. Eventually, all were caught and suspended without pay for the duration of the investigation, which found that they had failed to change the track, or to warn the driver in sufficient time. They were Prashant Kumar Verma, Vinayak Neelakantha, Shesharao Sayedu, Srinivas Suryavanshi and G Krishnaih. Indian Railways minister, Nitish Kumar stated,

"It was a human failure as the point was not set for the train which went ahead on the same track where another train was already stationed".
