= Dete =

Dete Hope County
- Location in Zimbabwe
- Coordinates: 18°37′08″S 26°51′33″E
- Country: Zimbabwe
- Elevation: 1,091 m (3,579 ft)

Population
  - Total: 2,993
- Climate: BSh

Dete (previously known as Dett)is a small railway re-crewing depot and a developing town on the Bulawayo-Hwange-Victoria Falls railway line in Zimbabwe, approximately 300 km (190 mi) north-west of Bulawayo and 67 km (42 mi) south-east of Hwange, lying within the Hwange National Park.

== Features ==
While originally unpopular with train crews stationed there because of its relative isolation and limited shopping and education facilities, these drawbacks were offset by a daily financial allowance and an extra day of paid leave for every month served there by railway workers. In the modern day though, Dete has grown into a full community.

There are three main suburbs. The largest two are the densely populated Mtuya and Soweto. Mtuya is made up of predominantly mud houses with thatch roofs, while Soweto is composed of brick houses with asbestos roofing. Soweto and the smaller Bote were electrified under the government's R.E.P in 2012. The smaller and less densely populated suburb is the 'Railways' suburb, originally built by the railways for its workers, but now inhabited by a mixture of the wealthier Dete inhabitants.

Residents of Dete are used to seeing wild game visit their houses and backyards. Over the years, animals have made good to stay away from residential areas lest they be prey for poachers, save for elephants that still terrorise the area. For visitors, Dete offers easy access to Hwange Main Camp, a popular entry point to the Hwange National Park. There is also access to the local Detema Safari Lodge, as well as the Hwange Safari Lodge. Detema Safari Lodge was burnt down in 2011 in a case of a wildfire and what remains is a ruin. There is New Game Reserve Hotel which is located at the Dete shopping centre and Miombo Lodge some three kilometres east of the shopping centre.

There are two primary schools, Sir Roy Welensky School, Dete (located within the Railway suburb, and St Francis Xavier School, Dete (a Catholic school). There is a local day secondary school called Detema Secondary School, as well as the Marist Brothers Secondary School (established 1972), located five kilometers from Dete town.

Dete is near the Kamativi tin mine and its economy depends on that and small grocery shops that serve the community. The majority of income earners are civil servants, while the major portion of residents subsist on urban agriculture, i.e. small plots.

== Train system ==
Bulawayo-based train crews booked off on arrival at Dete, while Dete or Hwange train crews worked the train further north to Hwange.

This system of trains working was phased out when diesel locomotives were introduced on the Bulawayo-Victoria Falls railway line.

== See also ==
- Dete train crash, 2003 railway accident
