= Dete train crash =

2003 railway accident in Zimbabwe

Coordinates: 18°37′11″S 26°51′05″E

Details
- Date: 1 February 2003
- Incident type: Collision, derailment, and fire
- Cause: Signaling miscommunication

Statistics
- Deaths: 50
- Injured: 64

The Dete train crash was a railway accident which occurred on 1 February 2003 in the Zimbabwean town of Dete in the Western part of the country about 90 miles (140 km) from Victoria Falls.

The accident involved the collision of a crowded passenger train and an industrial transport carrying tankers full of a highly flammable liquid to a coal mine on the Bulawayo to Victoria Falls line. The fast passenger train, which was carrying over 1,100 passengers reportedly collided with the slower freight train after a signalling failure. The train left the tracks, eleven carriages being thrown in the air or overturned. Flammable materials inside the carriages then caught fire spreading to the industrial goods train.

Although the fire did quickly consume both of the trains, the Zimbabwean Civil Protection Unit arrived quickly, and were able to rescue many of those trapped before the flames reached them. Total casualties were reported to be 50 killed and 64 seriously injured in the crash, with well over one hundred minor injuries. All the casualties were transferred to a hospital in Hwange, which is situated in the area.

Robert Mugabe's state censorship of the media meant that all news reports announced that the disaster was the result of a foreign boycott of Zimbabwean products, which had led to severely limited foreign currency reserves, so that trains were over crowded because motor transport cannot get fuel and that railway equipment is outdated because the repairs need cannot be paid for. Many news outlets also hinted that the crash may have been the result of sabotage by the rival party in Zimbabwe, Movement for Democratic Change, a stance treated with severe doubt in foreign press articles.

The crash was most likely the result of out-of-date and poorly maintained equipment on the Zimbabwe railway breaking down, which meant that the signal instruction intended to warn the approaching passenger train of the presence of the slow train ahead was never received by the signal and thus never displayed, resulting in the accident.

A group of Lions club members some of whom were rail enthusiasts, travelling for a conference in Victoria Falls were asleep in their bunks at the rear of the train. Uninjured, they quickly left the train and could see that (a) The fire was consuming the carriages and (b) The last two carriages were still on the rails. Climbing back into the rear most carriage they gathered bed sheets, knotted them together they then disconnected the last two carriages from the train. Using the sheets they manually pulled the last two cars clear of the burning train thereby saving them from certain destruction. A locomotive later arrived and towed the two carriages with many uninjured survivors back to Bulawayo.

== See also ==
- National Railways of Zimbabwe
- List of rail accidents (2000–present)
