= Rhodesia Regiment =

The Rhodesia Regiment
- The Rhodesia Regiment insignia following the Rhodesian Declaration of Independence in 1965.
- Active: 1899–1900; 1914–1917; 1927–1980
- Country: Rhodesia
- Allegiance: United Kingdom (1899–1965); Rhodesia (1965–70); Republic of Rhodesia (1970–79); Zimbabwe Rhodesia (1979); United Kingdom (1979–80)
- Branch: Regular Army
- Type: Infantry
- Colours: Green, red and black
- March: The Rhodesian Regiment
- Engagements: Second Boer War; First World War; Second World War; Rhodesian Bush War

Commanders
- Ceremonial chief: Incumbent British monarch (until 1970)

The Rhodesia Regiment (RR) was one of the oldest and largest regiments in the Rhodesian Army. It served on the side of the United Kingdom in the Second Boer War and the First and Second World Wars and served the Republic of Rhodesia in the Rhodesian Bush War.

During the First World War, an affiliation was formed between the King's Royal Rifle Corps (KRRC) and the Rhodesia Regiment, with a platoon of Rhodesians serving in the 2 KRRC. In addition to the similar cap badge with a red backing, the affiliation with the KRRC led to many similarities in uniform as a rifle regiment with private soldiers holding the title of "Rifleman".

In 1947, as a result of its service in World War II the regiment was granted the title of Royal Rhodesia Regiment by King George VI, who became the regiment's first Colonel-in-Chief. When Rhodesia became a republic in 1970, the regiment's title reverted to Rhodesia Regiment with Queen Elizabeth II resigning her position as Colonel-in-Chief.

== Colonial history ==
The Rhodesia Regiment was created in 1899 primarily from recruits from Matebeleland as a mounted infantry formation, with many coming from the Southern Rhodesia Volunteers. Their first commanding officer was Major later Lieutenant Colonel Herbert Charles Onslow Plumer who had previously commanded a Corps of Mounted Riflemen in the Second Matabele War. The Regiment served in the Second Boer War and was disbanded in 1900, shortly after the relief of Mafeking.

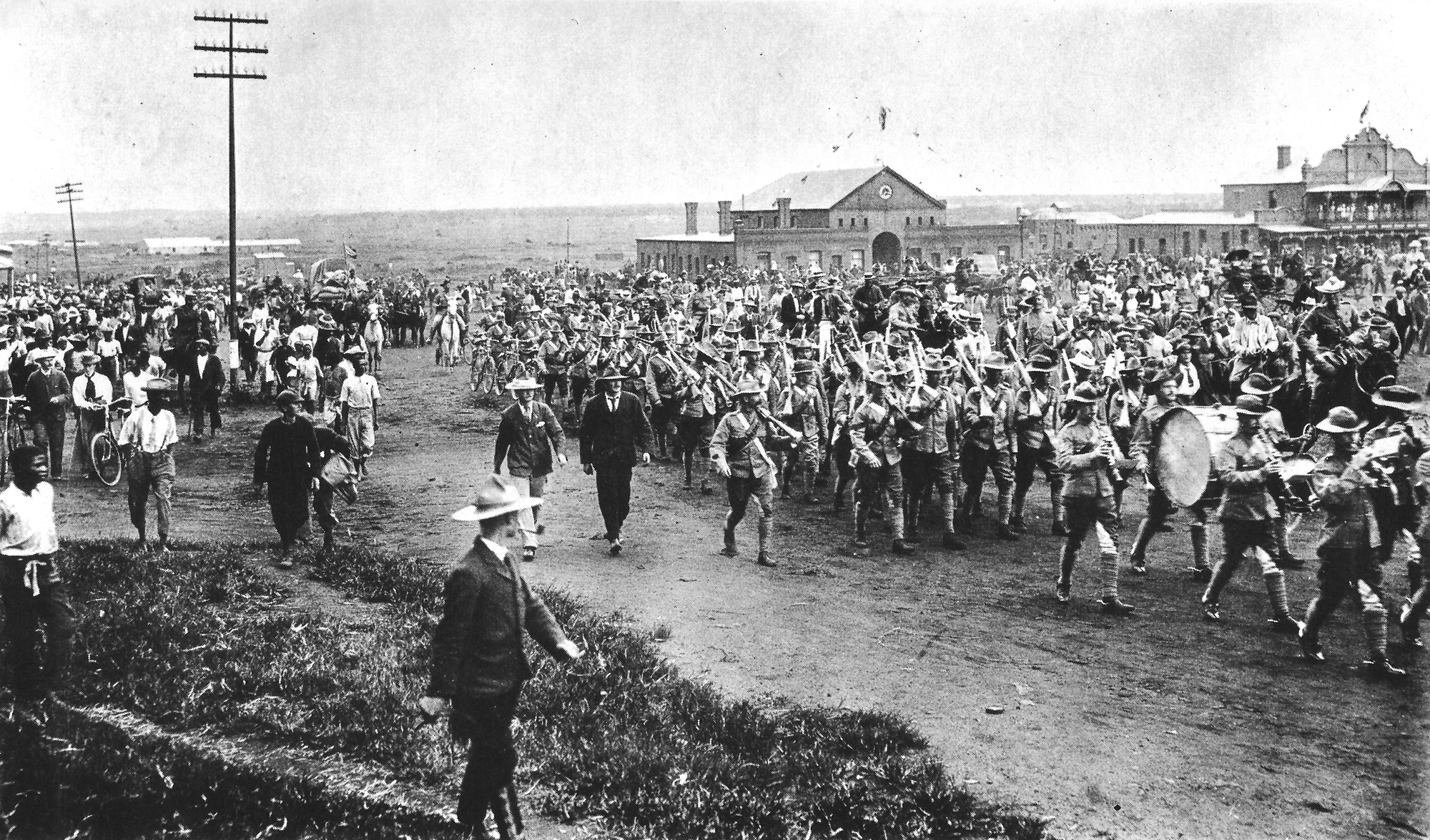
Rhodesian volunteers leaving Salisbury for service in the Second Boer War, 1899

In the First World War the 1st Rhodesia Regiment was formed in October 1914 initially consisting of 20 officers and 500 soldiers. It was sent to the Cape where it took part in the South West Africa Campaign under General Louis Botha whilst a 2nd Rhodesia Regiment was formed in November and was sent to British East Africa. The 1st was disbanded in July 1915 with many men joining the 2nd Regiment that also included thirty African scouts.

Frederick Selous (after whom the Selous Scouts were named) was present at Kilimanjaro and other actions in Tanganyika and reported in letters to friends that the Rhodesia Regiment acquitted itself very well at Taveta, though, as with other white regiments from the Empire, malaria and dysentery accounted for a very high number of casualties. Due to these casualties and the lack of replacements from the home country, where 40% of the adult white male population was on active service, the 2nd Rhodesia Regiment returned home in April 1917 and disbanded in October. The majority of the Southern Rhodesia Volunteers were themselves disbanded in 1920 for reasons of cost, the last companies being disbanded in 1926.

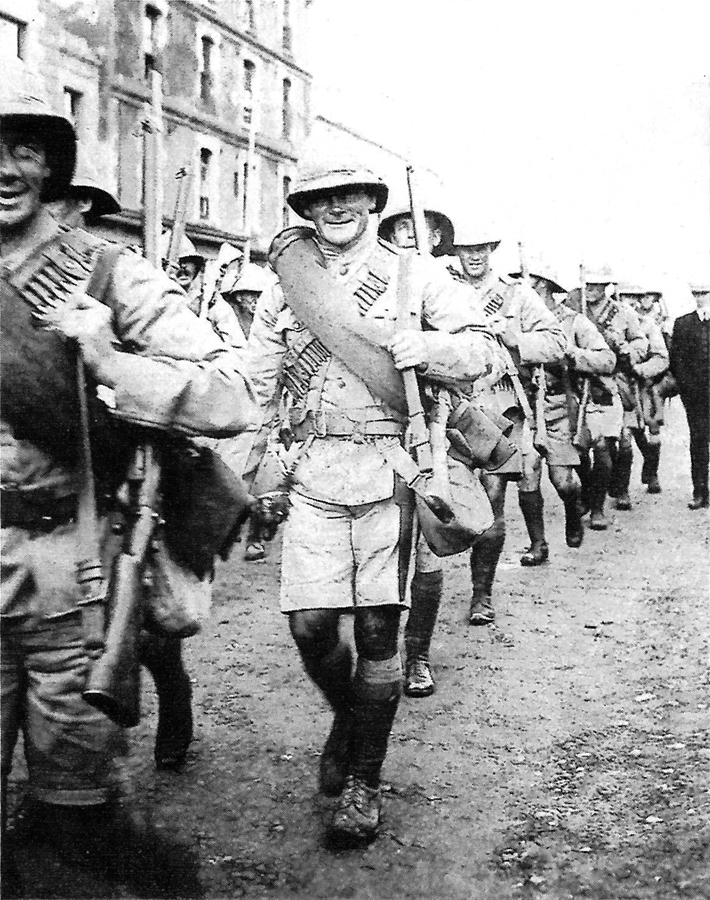
Soldiers of the Rhodesia Regiment in Cape Town in 1914, during World War I

The Defence Act of 1927 created a Permanent Force, (the Rhodesian Staff Corps) and a Territorial Force as well as national compulsory military training. With the Southern Rhodesia Volunteers disbanded in 1927, the Rhodesia Regiment was reformed in the same year as part of the nation's Territorial Force. The 1st Battalion was formed in Salisbury with a detached "B" company in Umtali and the 2nd Battalion in Bulawayo with a detached "B" Company in Gwelo. In 1929, King George V approved the transfer of the Colours of the 1st and 2nd Rhodesia Regiments of World War I, together with the Great War Honours, to the Rhodesia Regiment. The Colours are now safeguarded in the Cathedral of St Mary and All Saints, Harare.

During the Second World War, conscription was introduced in 1939. The Regiment's members were absorbed into British (including the Long Range Desert Group and the KRRC) and South African military units as it was feared the loss of the nation's manpower in one regiment would have disastrous effects on the nation. Though individual soldiers went to various regiments, the two battalions remained behind for Home Service. The regiment was initially mobilised for the Korean War in 1951 but never deployed to that theatre.

Territorial service in Rhodesia was four months active service for training followed by three years of part-time service. With territorial service extended to Northern Rhodesia the 3rd (Northern Rhodesia) Battalion, Royal Rhodesia Regiment was formed in 1955. This formation was different from the mixed-race active service Northern Rhodesia Regiment.

After the Federation of Rhodesia and Nyasaland in 1953 to 1963 all units received the prefix "Rhodesia and Nyasaland".

National service was introduced in 1955 with the training depot being established at Llewellin Barracks near Bulawayo. With the Emergency in Nyasaland, a 4th Battalion (4RR) was formed in Manicaland in June 1959. In March 1960 the 5th, 6th, and 7th Battalions were formed as a reserve with an 8th Battalion formed on 13 February 1961. The 9th Battalion was formed in 1961 with the 10th Battalion created in 1964. The Depot Company was formed on 1 January 1964 to only be responsible for training, but when needed provide up to two extra rifle companies.

== Post U.D.I. ==
Following the Unilateral Declaration of Independence (UDI) in 1965, the Royal Rhodesia Regiment (RRR), as it was called from 1947 until 1970, consisted of a number of territorial army battalions (1RR, 2RR, 4RR, 5RR, 6RR, 8RR, 9RR, 10RR) and 6 national service independent companies (1 Indep Coy RR, 2 Indep Coy RR, 3 Indep Coy RR, 4 Indep Coy RR, 5 Indep Coy RR and 6 Indep Coy, RR) as well as a training depot, DRR, which received and trained most of the Rhodesian Army national servicemen from the 1950s onwards. 3RR and 7RR were Northern Rhodesian (Zambia) battalions that became part of the Zambian Army. After national service they were posted to a territorial battalion in or close to the town or city they hailed from.

The regiment had drill halls in the larger towns of Rhodesia, where the citizen soldiers would report when mustered. During the counterinsurgency (COIN) war the battalions of the regiment identified with a brigade HQ, as for instance 2RR, 6RR and 9RR with 1 Brigade in Bulawayo, 1RR, 5RR, 8RR and 10RR with 2 Brigade in Salisbury and 4RR with 3 Brigade in Umtali. Along with regular battalions, they formed the infantry core of the brigade, to which various specialised infantry (e.g. Fireforce) and supporting service units (e.g. Armour, Signals, Engineers) were attached at the Brigade Main HQs established in operational areas.

4RR was quartered at Grand Reef aerodrome WSW of Umtali and was responsible for the Thrasher Sector stretching from Inyanga to Chipinga. At Grand Reef, 4RR Main occupied the centre of the camp, while its companies were established in temporary operational bases, usually deserted farms or schools along the sector, in the Honde and Burma Valleys to name two such camps. 4RR, like some other battalions, had a tracking unit camped on the ground at the 4RR Main HQ next to the wet canteen and the runway, many of the members of the 'Sparrows' being founder members of the Selous Scouts tracking school.

When there was a contact or a sighting anywhere in the sector, the RR trackers were dropped on the spoor by an Alouette helicopter and did the dangerous work of follow-up. When or if they had run the enemy to ground, then the Fireforce was called in to surround and eliminate them with superior numbers, firepower and air support. The Sparrows on the other hand, usually three or four, armed with FNs and an MAG, covered in green 'jungle juice', would frequently run down and then face an enemy force which usually outnumbered and out-gunned them. Many people in the Brigade HQ knew how busy they were kept with daily call-outs, and held them in very high regard. One such action which received publicity was the contact at Hill 31 on 15 November 1976.

The Independent Companies were where conscripts ended up if they did not volunteer for more glamorous infantry or specialist units, consequently they tended to be the more conservative, long-suffering, persistent sloggers. An intake of some 300 men reporting to Depot RR would be whittled down to about 30 of these individuals, the remainder of the intake 'skiving off' to support or specialist units elsewhere in the army over the course of the first four and a half months. 1 and 4 Indeps were stationed at Victoria Falls or Wankie with 1 Indep moving to Beitbridge in late 1978, 2 Indep at Kariba, 3 Indep at Inyanga and 5 and 6 Indeps at Umtali. 1 Indep Coy formed the core of Rhodesia's fourth Fireforce unit called Fireforce Delta. For a brief time a unit of French volunteers formed 7 Indep Coy, who wore a French tricolour backing on their beret badge.

The RR battalions and their national service counterparts, the Independent Companies, rarely received much attention in the media but covered most of the ground that was ever covered on aggressive foot patrols by the Rhodesian Forces. They ambushed and were ambushed. When there was trouble, as often as not, it was a Bedford lorry full of RR soldiers who were first on the scene of a massacre, a contact, or an attack. It was the ordinary citizens who recognised their contribution: as it was, the regiment was peopled by the citizens and the citizens knew it from the inside and the outside. The Regiment was honoured by being given the Freedom of Towns and Cities throughout the country.

The Regiment's effectiveness deteriorated in the last year and a half of the COIN war when it became manned by rapidly trained African volunteers and conscripts. At the same time the experienced European members, many of them family men, were emigrating to South Africa as the end drew near, so that by December 1979 the Regiment was barely recognisable for what it had once been, all through its long association with the colony and republic of Rhodesia. Morale was shattered and the Regiment, as happened to many others, disappeared when the British peacefully took over the executive powers of the country, Zimbabwe-Rhodesia, in that month. With the creation of Zimbabwe, the Rhodesia Regiment ceased by definition.

== Badge and uniform ==
On the regimental badge, consisting of a dark grey to black Maltese cross, battle honours are recorded in the four cross-members, as follows:

- S.W. Africa, 1914–15 (top);
- East Africa 1916–17, Beho Beho (right);
- Great War, Kilimanjaro, 1914–18 (left)
- Second World War (bottom).

The Lion and Tusk of the British South Africa Company is featured above the centre of the cross, with a crown in the middle of the cross. When the regiment was a royal regiment (1947–1970), the royal crown was displayed at the top of the cross and the lion and tusk in the centre.

The regimental badge had a cloth diamond shape backing split in half coloured black on the left side and rifle green on the right side with the first three battalions having vertical red stripes for the number of the battalion, one, two and three respectively. The 4th (Manicaland) Battalion (4 RR) wore a blue and white hackle, the colours of Umtali. In 1960 the diamond-shaped flash was changed to an all-red diamond, similar to the KRRC.

The slouch hat was worn from the unit's formation to end of the 1960s where it was replaced by a rifle green beret. The khaki drill uniform, like that of most of the peace-time army, consisted of a heavily starched, short-sleeved light green drill shirt and similarly starched KD shorts (knee-long khaki drill short trousers), khaki woollen hose-tops and puttees, black ammo boots, a black webbing belt or regimental stable belt and a rifle green beret with the regimental badge underlain by a scarlet diamond-shaped flash. In war time, from about 1970 onwards, the everyday uniform was camouflage denim with a webbing belt and beret. The colours of the regiment were red, black and rifle green – on the stable belt, black above, green below and a thin red stripe in the middle.
