= Defence Cross for Distinguished Service =

Rhodesian military decoration

- Ribbon of the D.C.D.
- Type: Decoration
- Awarded for: Distinguished service to Rhodesia's armed forces
- Country: Rhodesia
- Post-nominals: D.C.D.
- Status: No longer awarded
- Established: 1970
- First award: 1975

Precedence
- Next (higher): Bronze Cross of Rhodesia
- Equivalent: Police Cross for Distinguished Service; Rhodesia Prison Cross for Distinguished Service
- Next (lower): Meritorious Conduct Medal

The Defence Cross for Distinguished Service was a Rhodesian military decoration awarded for distinguished service to Rhodesia's armed forces.

== Institution ==
The award was instituted in 1970 by Presidential Warrant, the first awards being made in 1975.

== Medal ==
The medal was a sterling silver cross worn on the breast, with at its centre a roundel containing a device of a lion's head and the legend FOR DISTINGUISHED SERVICE, while the reverse was blank. The medal was impressed in small capitals with the recipient's name on the reverse, and was awarded with a case of issue, miniature medal for wear, and an illuminated certificate. The ribbon was half scarlet, half Cambridge blue, with a central silver stripe and green edges.

== Recipients ==
19 awards of the Defence Cross for Distinguished Service were made between 1970 and 1979. Recipients included Army Generals Peter Walls, Derry McIntyre, and Bruce Campling.

Recipients were entitled to the post-nominal letters D.C.D.

== Zimbabwe ==
The Defence Cross for Distinguished Service fell into abeyance following Zimbabwe Rhodesia's adoption of majority rule in 1979, and the country's transformation into Zimbabwe a year later. It has been partially replaced by the military division of the Zimbabwean Medal for Meritorious Service.

== See also ==
Orders, decorations, and medals of Rhodesia
