= Ministry of Sport, Recreation, Arts and Culture =

Government ministry of Zimbabwe

Ministry of Sports, Recreation, Arts and Culture

Ministry overview
- Preceding Ministry: Ministry of Youth, Sport, Arts and Recreation
- Jurisdiction: Government of Zimbabwe
- Headquarters: 20th Floor, Mukwati Building, Cnr Livingstone Ave and Simon Muzenda St, Harare; 17.822226°S 31.053727°E
- Minister responsible: Anselem Nhamo Sanyatwe, Minister of Sport, Recreation, Arts and Culture
- Deputy Minister responsible: Emily Jesaya, Deputy Minister of Sport, Recreation, Arts and Culture
- Ministry executive: Nicholas Moyo, Permanent Secretary
- Parent department: Cabinet of Zimbabwe
- Website: x.com/minsport_artszw

The Ministry of Sports, Recreation, Arts and Culture is a cabinet ministry of the government of Zimbabwe. The position was created by President Emmerson Mnangagwa following his cabinet formation in December 2017 when he split Higher Education and Primary and Secondary Education into two separate government agencies, the latter being responsible for sports and the arts prior to this move.

The minister is The Honourable Lieutenant General (Rtd) Anselem Nhamo Sanyatwe, who was appointed on 25 March 2025, replacing former Olympic swimmer Kirsty Coventry, following her election as President of the International Olympic Committee.

In 1980, Robert Mugabe created a Ministry of Youth, Sport and Recreation, which he filled with a woman.
