= Ladhowal train fire =

2003 Indian train fire

Coordinates: 30°58′N 75°48′E

At 4am on 16 May 2003, a flash fire began on the Frontier Mail train service in India, engulfing three carriages before it could be extinguished. The fire killed 39 people, and another 15 were hospitalised with severe burns.

== Events ==
The train service from Mumbai to Amritsar had just passed the station at Ludhiana Junction and was approaching Ladhowal, travelling at over 100 km/h.

One eyewitness reported that the fire began as a result of a dropped cigarette, whilst another said he saw electrical wiring in the toilet of the fourth carriage catch alight. Whatever the cause, the speed of the train, combined with the open windows during the Indian summer, caused an inferno as air carried the fire back through three carriages in a massive burst of flame.

Most of the dead were killed in this initial burst, as doors were slammed shut by the gust, trapping the commuters inside, where they burned to death. Some riders dove under seats or leaped from the train, but over 50 people were killed or critically injured in the first few seconds of the fire. Of the dead, 34 were in carriage five, and five were in carriage four. Those in carriage three escaped with mild burns, although all three carriages were later gutted.

Four minutes after the fire had begun, the train stopped after the driver was alerted to an issue through an emergency cord. The train's crew detached the unburnt carriages, and crew and fellow passengers attempted to rescue those passengers injured in the fire, or who had leaped from the train to escape the flames. When emergency services arrived, there was no water available due to a local drought, so the wreckage had to be left to burn itself out.

Most of the dead were only identifiable by dental records. Some remained unidentified and were being buried in a mass grave. The cleanup operation involved over 100 soldiers, as well as police and medical personnel from as far as New Delhi.

== Reactions and investigation ==
It was the second major train accident in India of the new year, and provoked extensive criticism of the Transport Ministry, which was claiming vast improvements in safety standards on Indian railways, following a string of appalling accidents.

Officials later ruled out terrorism or sabotage, instead reporting that a spark lit some spilt flammable liquid in the toilet of carriage number five, which was caught by the wind and ripped down the train. A later report claimed the fire originated in a bag of 'combustible materials', but did not elaborate on how it caught fire.
