= Kamativi mine =

Tin mine in Zimbabwe

- Location within Zimbabwe
- Location: Matabeleland North Province, Zimbabwe; 18°19′41″S 27°4′0″E
- Products: tin, tantalum, lithium
- Opened: 1936
- Closed: 1994

The Kamativi mine was the largest tin mine in Zimbabwe. The mine is located in western Zimbabwe in Matabeleland North Province. The Kamativi mine has reserves amounting to 100 million tonnes of tin ore grading 0.28% tin thus resulting 0.28 million tonnes of tin. The tin and tantalum mine opened in 1936 and operated until 1994, when it closed due to lower tin prices on world markets. Since the mine's closure, local artisanal miners have worked the pegmatite for cassiterite and tantalite.

The ore has subsequently been determined to contain lithium, and a project has been launched to extract the lithium from the mine's tailings.
