= Zimbabwe Defence Forces =

Combined military forces of Zimbabwe

Zimbabwe Defence forces
- Mauto eZimbabwe
- Flag of the Zimbabwe Defence Forces
- Founded: 18 May 1980; 46 years ago
- Service branches: Zimbabwe National Army; Air Force of Zimbabwe
- Headquarters: Harare

Leadership
- President: Emmerson Mnangagwa
- Minister of Defence: Oppah Muchinguri
- Chief of Defence: Emmanuel Matatu

Personnel
- Conscription: N/A
- Active personnel: 29,000 active 21,800 paramilitary (ranked 83rd)

Expenditure
- Budget: $1.7 billion (2022)
- Percent of GDP: 2.16% (2018)

Industry
- Foreign suppliers: Russia; China; United States; Israel; Singapore; Belgium; United Kingdom

Related articles
- History: Military history of Zimbabwe
- Ranks: Military ranks of Zimbabwe

The Zimbabwe Defence Forces (ZDF) are the military forces responsible for the defence of Zimbabwe against external threats from other countries, and also to suppress internal armed factions. It is composed of the Zimbabwe National Army (ZNA) and the Air Force of Zimbabwe (AFZ). (As a landlocked country Zimbabwe does not have a navy). Since November 2025 the ZDF is headed by General Emmanuel Matatu.

== Ministry of Defence ==
In July 1994 the combined Zimbabwe Defence Forces Headquarters was created.

== Manpower ==
In 2007, the Zimbabwe National Army had an estimated strength of 29,000 and the Air Force of Zimbabwe had an estimated 4,000 men assigned.

== History ==
After a 15-year guerrilla war with black nationalist forces, culminating in a peace agreement in December 1979, Robert Mugabe became the first Prime Minister of Zimbabwe on 11 April 1980 following his ZANU–PF party winning the general election. Mugabe declared that integrating Zimbabwe's three armed forces would be one of Zimbabwe's top priorities. The existing Rhodesian Army was combined with the two guerrilla armies; the 20,000-strong Zimbabwe African National Liberation Army (ZANLA) forces of ZANU–PF and the 15,000-strong Zimbabwe People's Revolutionary Army (ZIPRA) forces of PF-Zimbabwe African People's Union. A British Military Assistance and Training Team played a pivotal role in assisting the creation of the new army, and was still in place in 2000. Meanwhile the Rhodesian Air Force was reorganised as the Air Force of Zimbabwe.

=== Mozambique Civil War ===
The Mozambique Civil War was a long-running conflict between the Marxist FRELIMO Government, and anti-communist RENAMO insurgents. During the 1970's, Rhodesian intelligence supported the rebel group, but in the years following the election of Robert Mugabe in 1980, the Zimbabwe Defence Forces (ZDF) switched to support the FRELIMO Government, in order to protect Zimbabwe's eastern city of Mutare and the strategic railway line to Mozambique's port city of Beira which were being attacked by RENAMO.

=== Operation Restore Legacy ===
In October 2017, the ZDF was involved in a coup d'état which resulted in the resignation of long-serving President Robert Mugabe and the formation of a new government under Emmerson Mnangagwa.
