= Operation Gatling =

1978 Rhodesian Bush War operation

- Part of Rhodesian Bush War
- Operation Gatling (Zambia)
Date	19–21 October 1978
Location	Westlands Farm, Chikumbi, Rufunsa, Zambia
Result	Rhodesian victory

Belligerents
Rhodesia	ZIPRA; Cuba (alleged)

Commanders and leaders
(Rhodesia) Ian Smith; Lt. Gen Peter Walls; Maj. Brian Robinson; Gp Cap. Norman Walsh; Sqn Ldr Chris Dixon (known during the raid as ‘Green Leader’)	Joshua Nkomo

Units involved
Rhodesian Army; RLI; Selous Scouts; SAS; RhAF; No.1 Squadron; No.5 Squadron	Unknown

Strength
8 Canberras (Green Section); 8 Hawker Hunters (Blue Section); 4 Alouette III (K-Cars); 1 DC-3C Dakota (Paradak); 1 Reims Cessna (Lynx)	4,000 cadres

Casualties and losses
1 killed 3 wounded 1 helicopter crashed	1,500 guerrillas killed (per Rhodesia); 351 civilians killed (per ZIPRA)

Cockpit audio from Operation Gatling, including the voice of Green Leader.

Operation Gatling was a military operation conducted by the Rhodesian Security Forces in Zambian territory on 19 October 1978, with the aim to attack camps believed to house guerrilla forces. The attack's primary target, just 16 kilometres (10 miles) north-east of central Lusaka, Zambia's capital, was the Westlands Farm, which at the time was known as "Freedom Camp" and run by the Zimbabwe African People's Union, one of the two main resistance groups opposing white minority rule in Rhodesia. The attack came after the previous month's Operation Snoopy, a Rhodesian raid into Mozambique targeting ZANLA camps in response to Air Rhodesia Flight 825 being shot down by guerrilla forces.

The Rhodesian raid's other targets were Chikumbi, 19 kilometres (12 miles) north of Lusaka, and Mkushi Camp; all three were to be attacked more or less simultaneously in a coordinated sweep across Zambia. Assaulting targets deep inside Zambia was a first for the Rhodesian forces; previously only liberation movement members near the border had been attacked.

== Background ==
Operation Gatling was divided up into three phases when it was being planned by the Rhodesian attacking force:

- Phase 1:
  The first phase of the operation would involve a series of airstrikes by the Air Force against the ZAPU camp situated at Westlands Farm.
- Phase 2:
  The second phase of the operation would involve an attack by the SAS made on the ZAPU camp at Mkushi, which was approximately 125 km north-east of the Zambian capital Lusaka. This attack was planned to commence at exactly the same time as the attack by the Air Force on the camp at Westlands Farm also known as Freedom Camp
- Phase 3:
  The third, and final, phase of the operation would involve an attack by the Rhodesian Light Infantry, the RLI, on another ZAPU-run camp located near the Great North Road, approximately 15 km north of Lusaka. The camp was referred to as the CGT-2 (Communist Guerrilla Training Camp) by the Rhodesians.

== The Operation ==
Led by Squadron Leader Chris Dixon, who identified himself to Lusaka Airport tower as "Green Leader", a Rhodesian Air Force group flew into Zambia at very low altitudes (thereby avoiding Zambian radar) and took control of the country's airspace for about a quarter of an hour during the initial assault on Westlands Farm, informing Lusaka tower that "Rhodesian Hawker Hunters were circling the Zambian airfields under orders to shoot down any fighter that attempted to take off". Under the impression of these threats the ill-equipped Zambians made no attempt to repel the Rhodesian airborne raid.

== Aftermath ==
The international community strongly condemned the 1978 Rhodesian attacks on Zambia, with the United Nations Security Council adopting Resolution 424 unanimously on 17 March 1978, which condemned the crimes committed by the outlawed Rhodesian regime that caused deaths and destruction. Zambia requested the Council's intervention, highlighting that the attacks were a serious threat to international peace and security. The subsequent multilateral initiative against the Rhodesian aggression acknowledged the fact that a significant number of victims in Zambia were in fact civilian refugees, not armed fighters.

During the course of Operation Gatling the attackers suffered only minor casualties during the three-day operation, and afterward claimed to have killed over 1,500 "ZIPRA cadres", many of whom were in fact unarmed refugees, as well as allegedly a number of Cuban instructors.

Historians Paul Moorcraft and Peter McLaughlin write that the number of guerrillas killed was exaggerated considerably, as most of Nkomo's army, then numbering about 10,000 fighters, had not been attacked during the raid. On the other hand, unarmed refugees often camped in or around insurgent positions, and hundreds of these had been killed in the Rhodesian raid. Moorcraft and McLaughlin comment that for the Rhodesian airmen, it would have been "impossible to distinguish innocent refugees from young ZIPRA recruits." Sibanda describes Freedom Camp as "a refugee camp for boys", and says "351 boys and girls" were killed. He claims that the Red Cross and the UN Refugee Agency "confirmed ZAPU's claim that Smith's forces struck at defenseless, civilian trainees".

In comparison, only one member of the Rhodesian SAS, trooper Jeff Collett, had been killed. Three other Rhodesian assailants were wounded during Operation Gatling. Two out of the three men wounded were helicopter pilots Mark Dawson and Roelf Oeloffse, who sustained injuries when their Alouette K-Car was hit by cannon fire, causing it to crash. Dawson suffered injuries to one of his legs and Roelf sustained injuries to his back. In total, the Rhodesians suffered four casualties and lost one helicopter during the operation.

This disproportionate ratio is evidence of the atrocious nature of the attack, since the camp inhabitants, many of whom were unarmed civilian refugees, were largely defenceless against the mechanised Rhodesian invasion by air and land and therefore couldn't repel the onslaught. A number of Zambian citizens were also killed in the raid, including noted Zambian musician and broadcaster Alick Nkhata who lived in the vicinity of the site.
