= Air Rhodesia Flight 827 =

1979 aircraft shootdown in Rhodesia

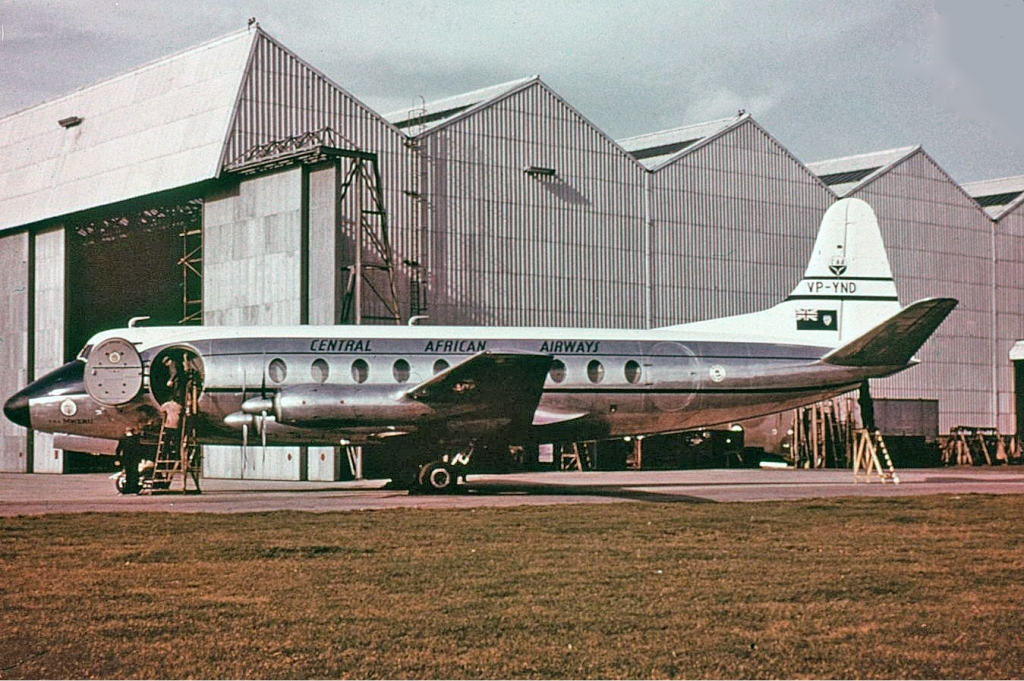
- The aircraft involved, while still in service with Central African Airways in 1957

Shootdown
- Date: 12 February 1979
- Summary: Shot down with a Strela 2 missile by ZIPRA guerrillas
- Site: Vuti African Purchase Area; 16°25′S 29°26′E

Aircraft
- Aircraft type: Vickers Viscount
- Aircraft name: Umniati
- Operator: Air Rhodesia
- Registration: VP-YND
- Flight origin: Salisbury International Airport, Rhodesia
- Last stopover: Kariba, Rhodesia
- Destination: Salisbury International Airport, Rhodesia
- Passengers: 55
- Crew: 4
- Fatalities: 59
- Survivors: 0

Air Rhodesia Flight 827, operated by Vickers Viscount VP-YND 'Umniati' was a scheduled civilian flight between Kariba and the capital, Salisbury, Rhodesia (now Harare, Zimbabwe), that was shot down soon after takeoff on 12 February 1979 by Zimbabwe People's Revolutionary Army (ZIPRA) guerrillas using a Strela 2 missile. The circumstances were very similar to the shooting down of Air Rhodesia Flight 825 five months earlier. As of 2025, this has remained the deadliest aviation incident in Rhodesian/Zimbabwean history.

== Incident ==
The flight's departure from Kariba had been delayed, and so the pilots did not take the time to climb over a lake to get above the ceiling of shoulder-launched anti-aircraft missiles before heading for Salisbury. ZIPRA had information that the Rhodesian Security Forces Commander General Peter Walls was on board, and they tried to assassinate him. However, he and his wife were on a second (similar) aircraft that took off 15 minutes later, immediately executing maneuvers designed to evade missiles, and landing safely in Salisbury.

As with the similar incident five months earlier, Flight 827 was damaged by one or more Strela-2 missiles (commonly known at the time as 'SAM-7', NATO reporting name SA-7) and came down in rough terrain in the Vuti African Purchase Area east of Lake Kariba. None of the 59 passengers or crew survived.

== Aftermath ==
Following the second incident, Air Rhodesia added shrouding to the exhaust pipes of their Viscount aircraft to reduce their infrared signature, and painted the aircraft with a low-radiation paint as countermeasures against heat-seeking missiles.

On 25 February 1979, the Rhodesian Air Force, with covert assistance from the South African Air Force, launched Operation Vanity, a retaliatory bombing raid against a ZIPRA camp near Livingstone, Zambia.

== Commemoration ==
A memorial to the victims of the two Rhodesian Viscount incidents, dubbed the Viscount Memorial, was erected on the grounds of the Voortrekker Monument in Pretoria, South Africa, in 2012, and inaugurated on 1 September that year. The names of the dead passengers and crew are engraved on two granite slabs that stand upright, side by side, the pair topped by an emblem symbolising an aircraft.

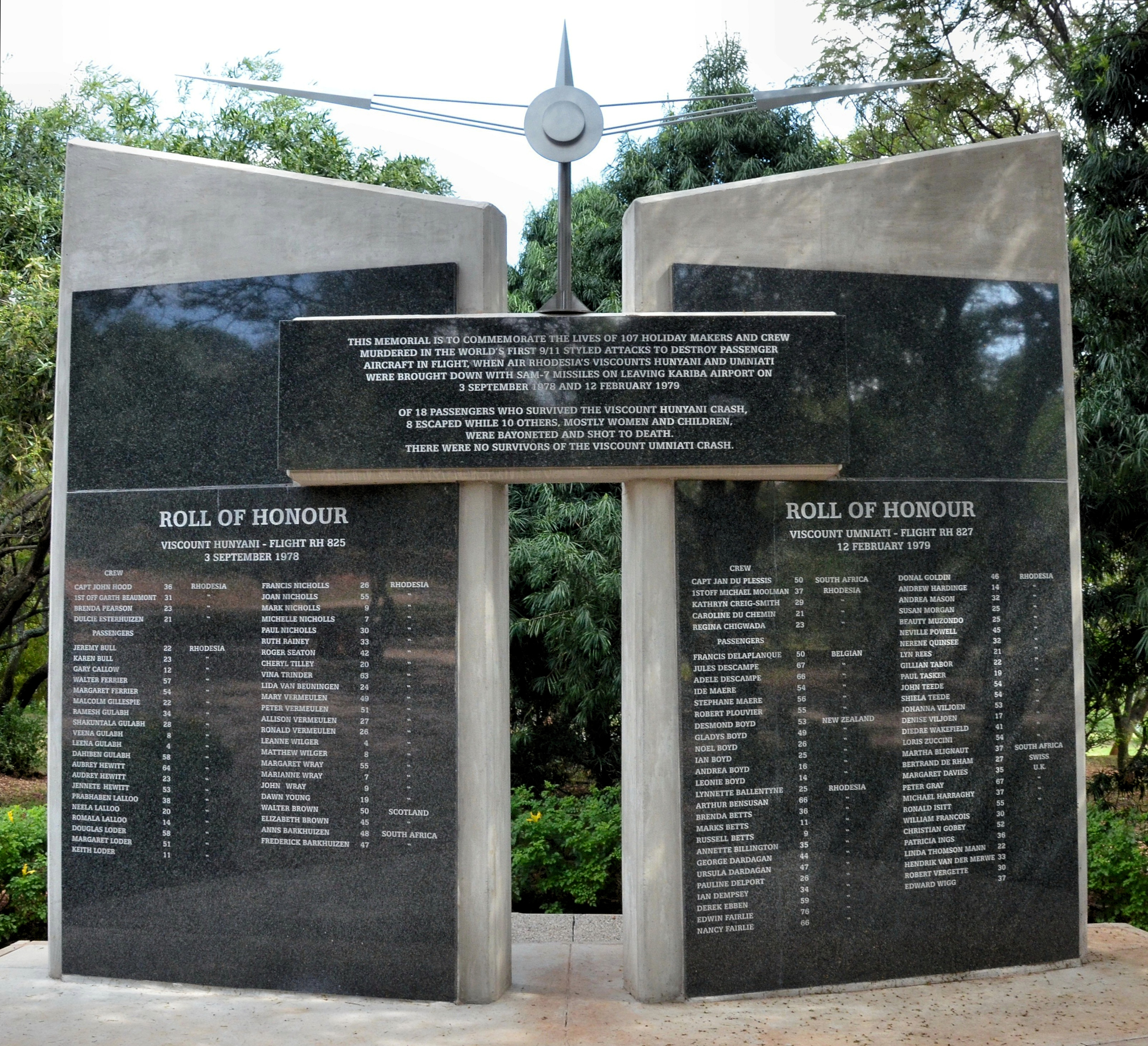
Viscount Memorial, erected in 2012 on the grounds of the Voortrekker Monument in Pretoria, South Africa
