= Voortrekker Monument =

Monument in Pretoria, South Africa

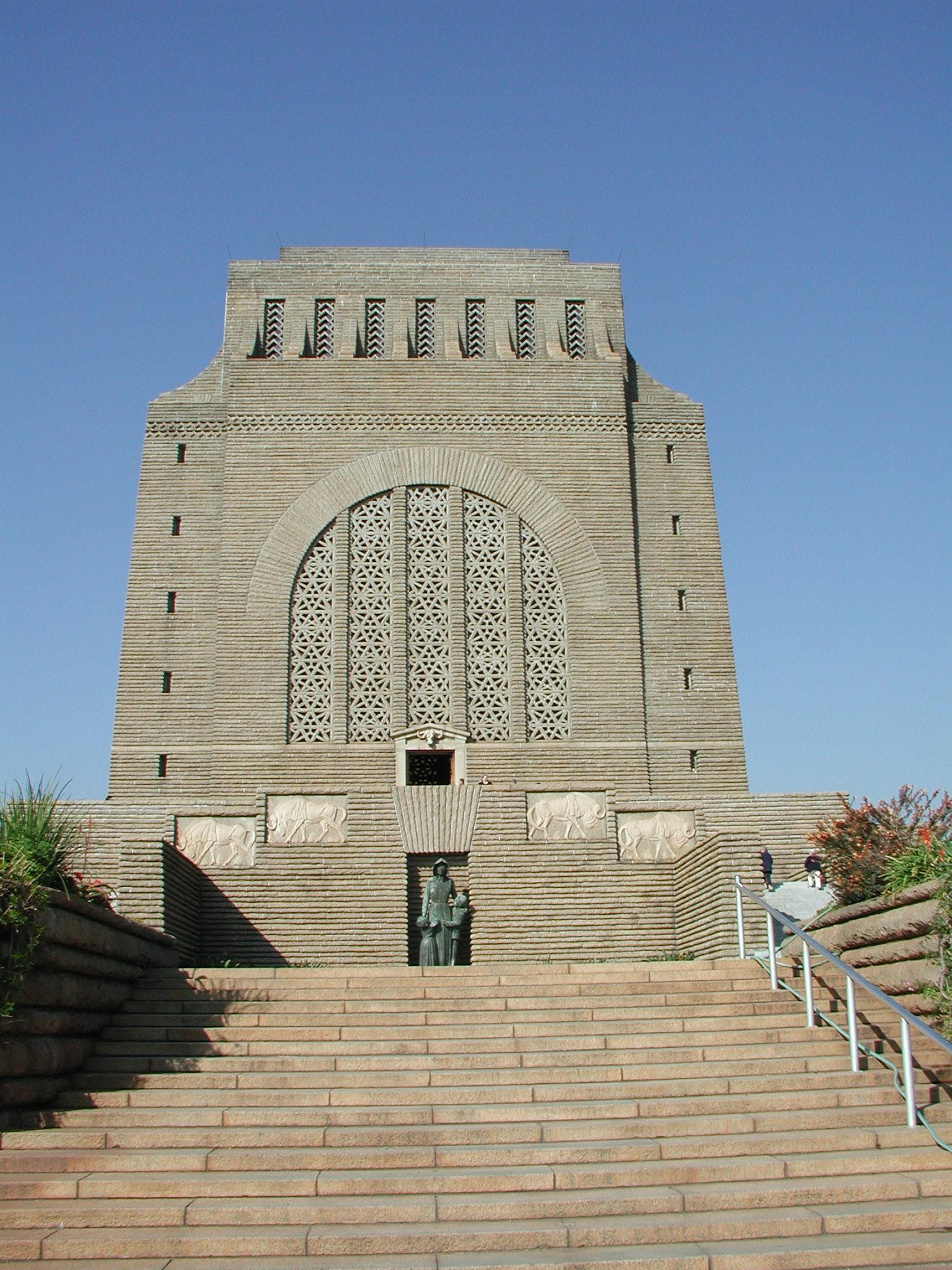
- The Monument from the front
- Interactive map of Voortrekker Monument
- Location: Pretoria, Gauteng, South Africa
- Coordinates: 25°46′35″S 28°10′39″E
- Designer: Gerard Moerdijk
- Material: Granite
- Length: 40 metres (130 ft)
- Width: 40 metres (130 ft)
- Height: 40 metres (130 ft)
- Beginning date: 13 July 1937
- Completion date: 12 December 1949
- Opening date: 16 December 1949
- Dedicated to: Voortrekkers

The Voortrekker Monument is located just south of Pretoria in South Africa. The granite structure is located on a hilltop, and was raised to commemorate the Voortrekkers who left the Cape Colony between 1835 and 1854. It was designed by the architect Gerard Moerdijk.

On 8 July 2011, the Voortrekker Monument was declared a National Heritage Site by the South African Heritage Resource Agency.

== History ==
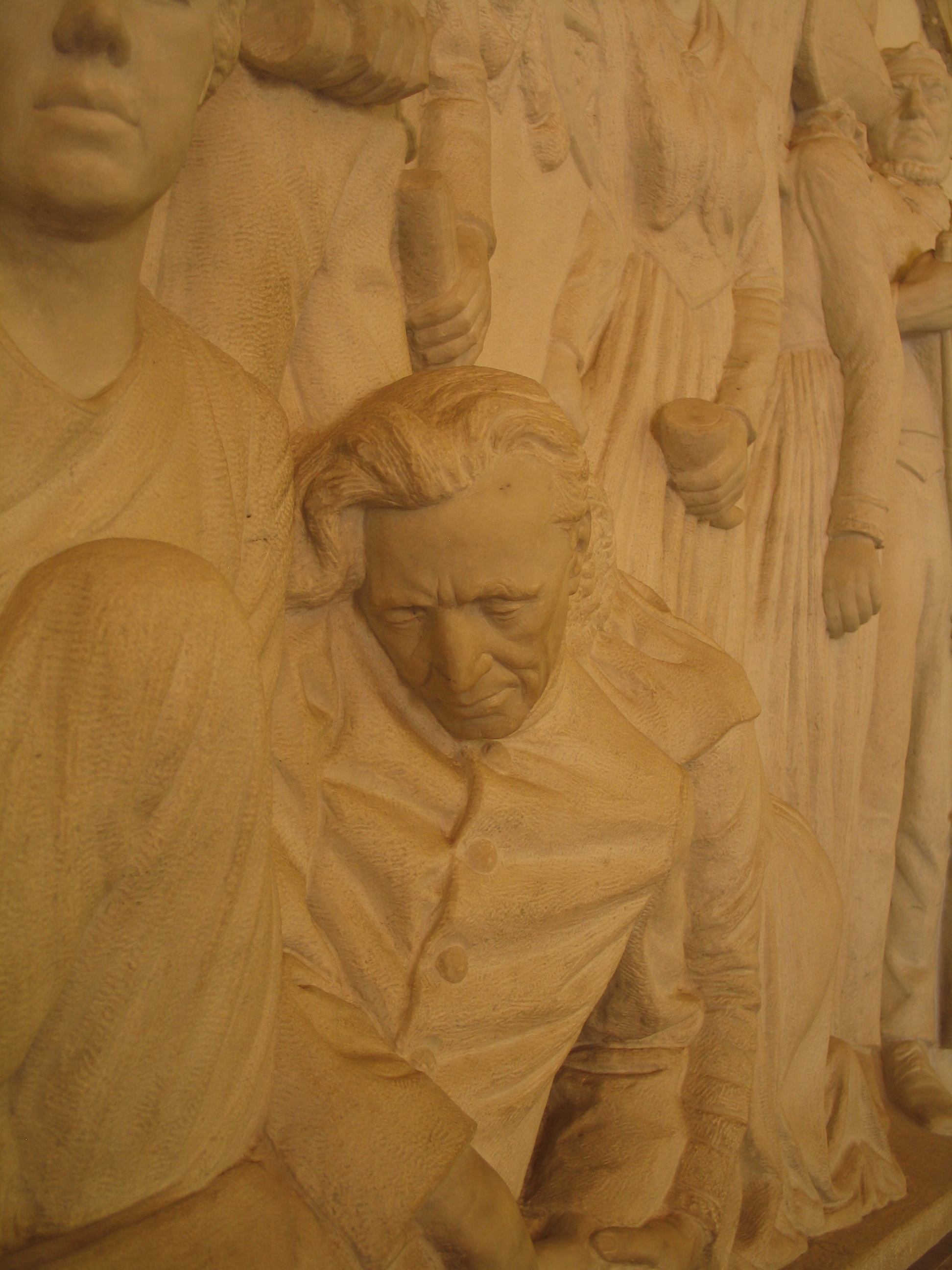
Wounded Voortrekker at Vegkop, detail of the historical frieze

The idea to build a monument in honour of the Voortrekkers was first discussed on 16 December 1888, when President Paul Kruger of the South African Republic attended the Day of the Covenant celebrations at Danskraal in Natal. However, the movement to actually build such a monument only started on 4 April 1931 when the Sentrale Volksmonumentekomitee (SVK; Central People's Monuments Committee) was formed to bring this idea to fruition.

Construction started on 13 July 1937 with a sod-turning ceremony performed by the chairman of the SVK, Advocate Ernest George Jansen, on what later became known as Monument Hill. On 16 December 1938 the cornerstone was laid by three descendants of some of the Voortrekker leaders: Mrs. J.C. Muller (granddaughter of Andries Pretorius), Mrs. K.F. Ackerman (great-granddaughter of Hendrik Potgieter) and Mrs. J.C. Preller (great-granddaughter of Piet Retief).

The monument was inaugurated on 16 December 1949 by Prime Minister D. F. Malan. The total construction cost of the monument was about £ 360,000, most of which was contributed by the South African government.

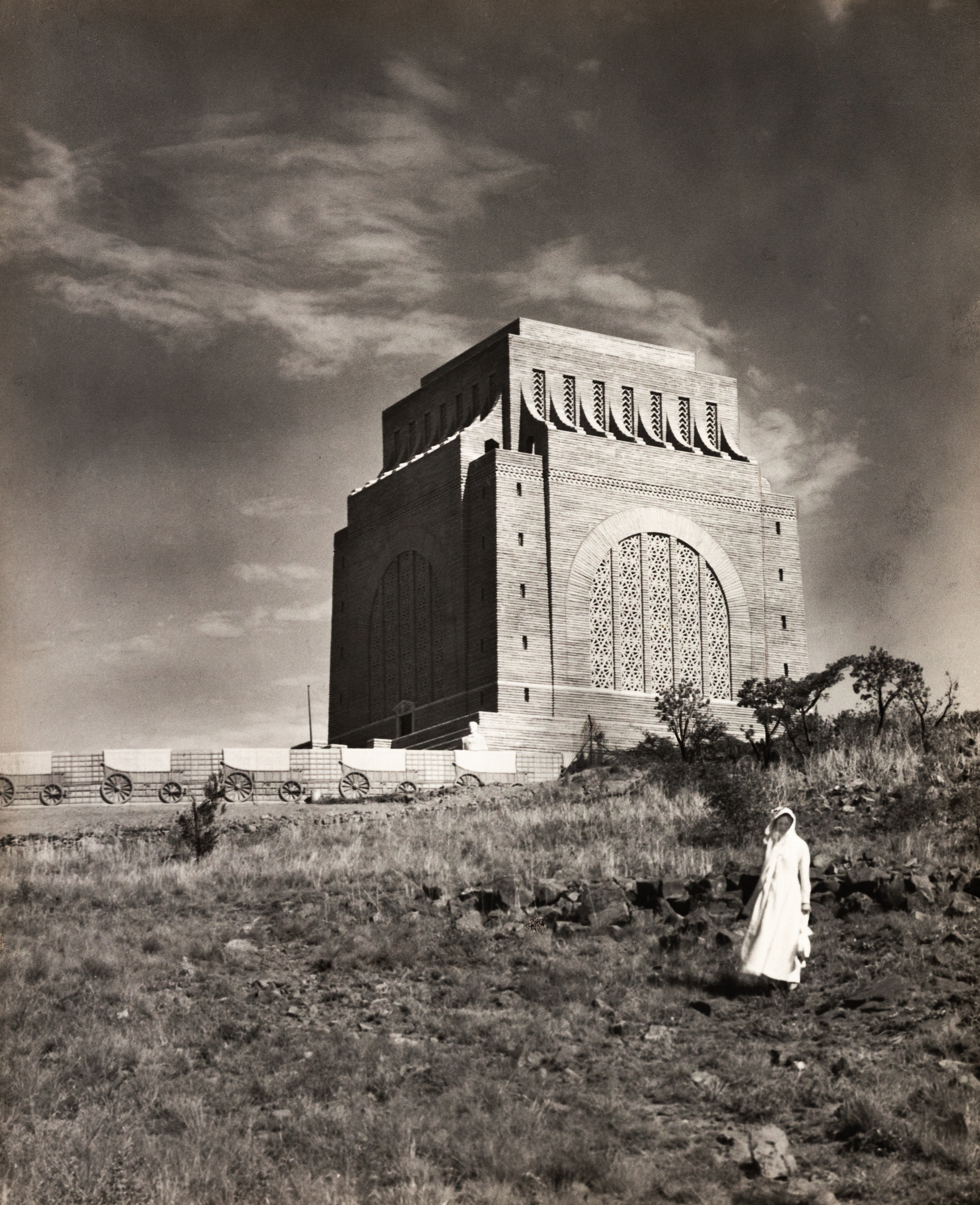
"Voortrekker Monument 1949" By Sara Buijskes

A large amphitheatre, which could seat approximately 20,000 people, was erected to the north-east of the monument in 1949.

== Main features ==
The Voortrekker Monument is 62 metres high, with a base of 40 metres by 40 metres. The building shares architectural resemblance with European monuments such the Dôme des Invalides in France and the Völkerschlachtdenkmal in Germany, but also contains African influences. The two main points of interest inside the building are the Historical Frieze and the Cenotaph.

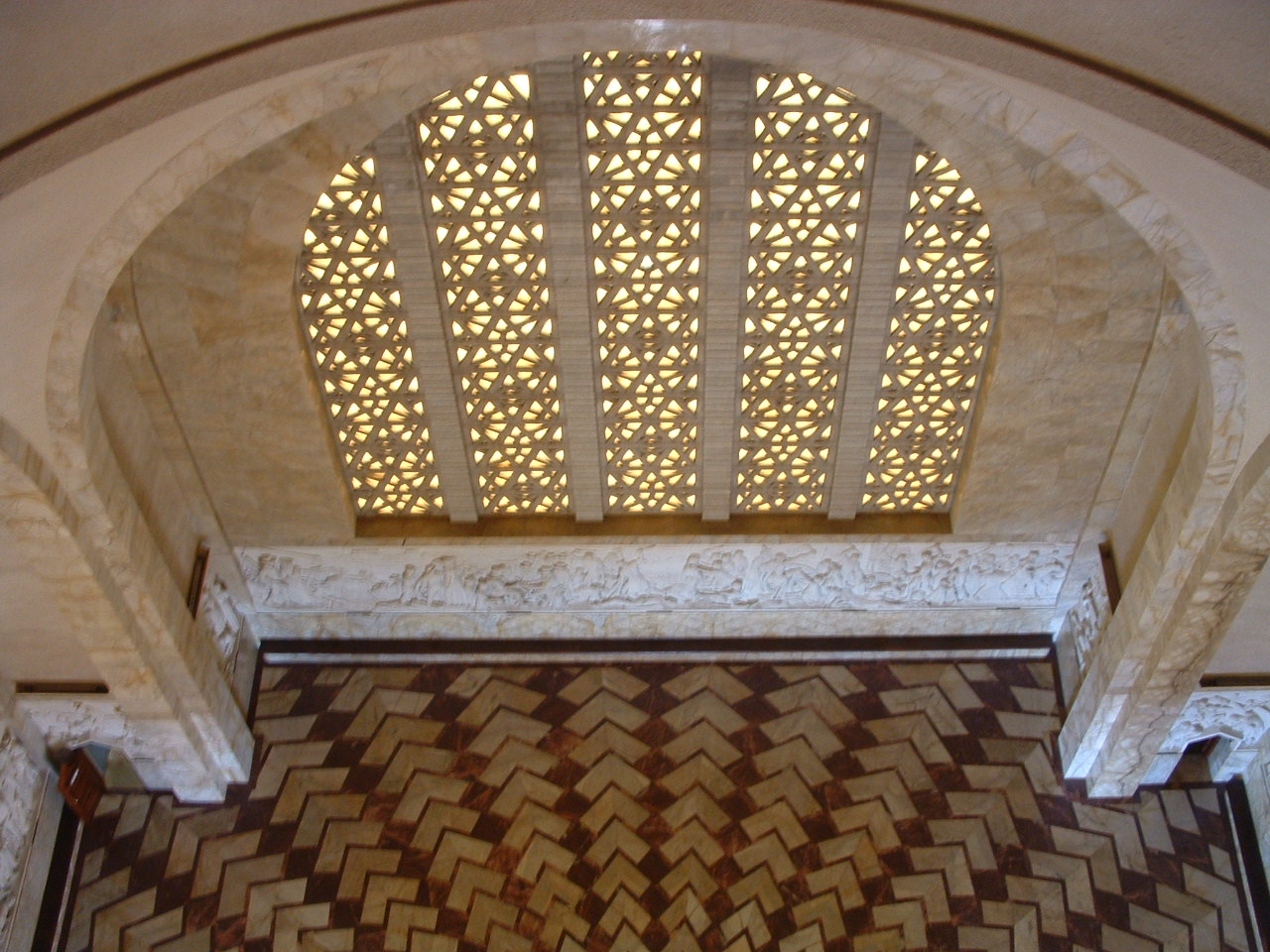
South window and frieze

=== Historical Frieze ===
The main entrance of the building leads into the domed Hall of Heroes. This massive space, flanked by four huge arched windows made from yellow Belgian glass, contains the unique marble Historical Frieze which is an intrinsic part of the design of the monument. It is the biggest marble frieze in the world. The frieze consists of 27 bas-relief panels depicting the history of the Great Trek, but incorporating references to everyday life, work methods and religious beliefs of the Voortrekkers. The set of panels illustrates key historical scenes starting from the first voortrekkers of 1835, up to the signing of the Sand River Convention in 1852. The centre piece depicts the Piet Retief Delegation massacre. In the centre of the floor of the Hall of Heroes is a large circular opening through which the Cenotaph in the Cenotaph Hall can be viewed.

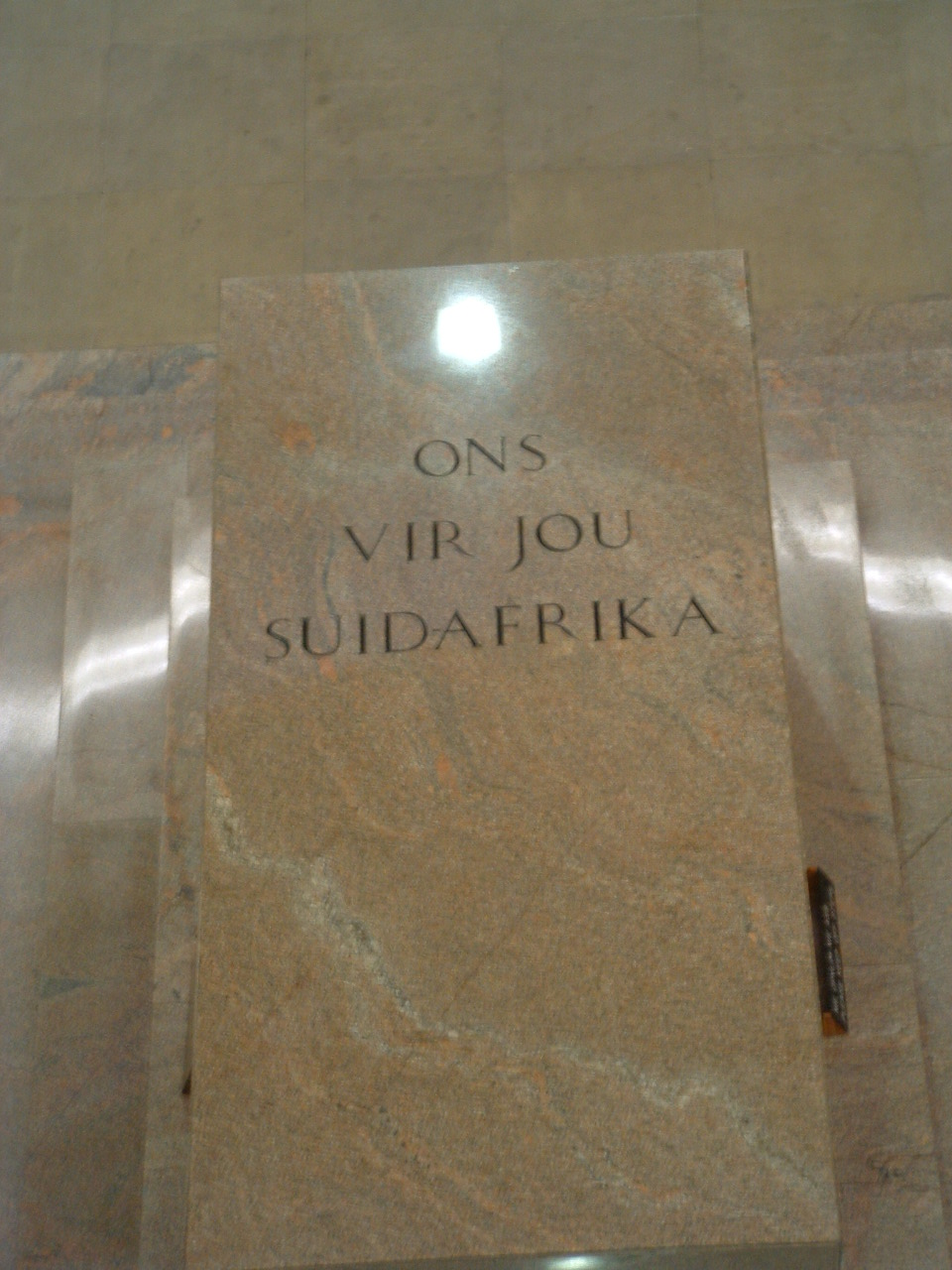
The Cenotaph

=== Cenotaph ===
The Cenotaph, situated in the centre of the Cenotaph Hall, is the central focus of the monument. In addition to being viewable from the Hall of Heroes it can also be seen from the dome at the top of the building, from where much of the interior of the monument can be viewed. Through an opening (oculus) in this dome a ray of sunlight shines at twelve o'clock on 16 December annually, falling onto the centre of the Cenotaph, striking the words 'Ons vir Jou, Suid-Afrika' (Afrikaans for 'We for Thee, South Africa'), a line from 'Die Stem van Suid-Afrika'. The ray of light symbolises God's blessing on the lives and endeavours of the Voortrekkers. 16 December 1838 was the date of the Battle of Blood River, commemorated in South Africa before 1994 as the Day of the Vow.

The Cenotaph Hall is decorated with the flags of the different Voortrekker Republics and contains wall tapestries depicting the Voortrekkers as well as several display cases with artefacts from the Great Trek. Against the northern wall of the hall is a niche with a lantern in which a flame has been kept burning ever since 1938. It was in that year that the Symbolic Ox Wagon Trek, which started in Cape Town and ended at Monument Hill where the Monument's foundation stone was laid, took place.

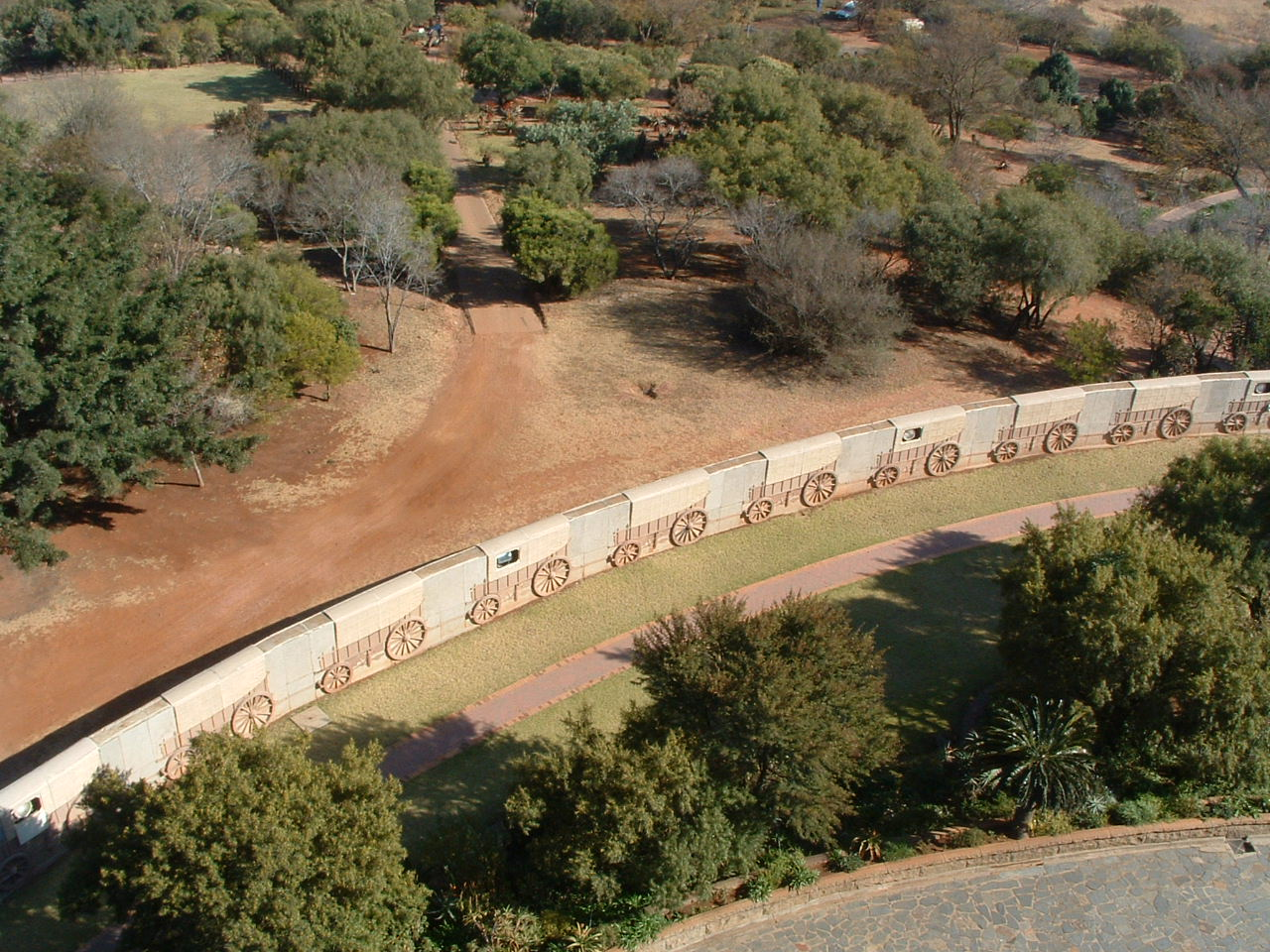
The wagon laager wall features 64 wagons

=== Other features ===
Visitors to the monument enter through a black wrought iron gate with an assegai (spear) motif.

After passing through the gate one finds oneself inside a big laager consisting of 64 ox-wagons made out of decorative granite. The same number of wagons were used at the Battle of Blood River to form the laager.

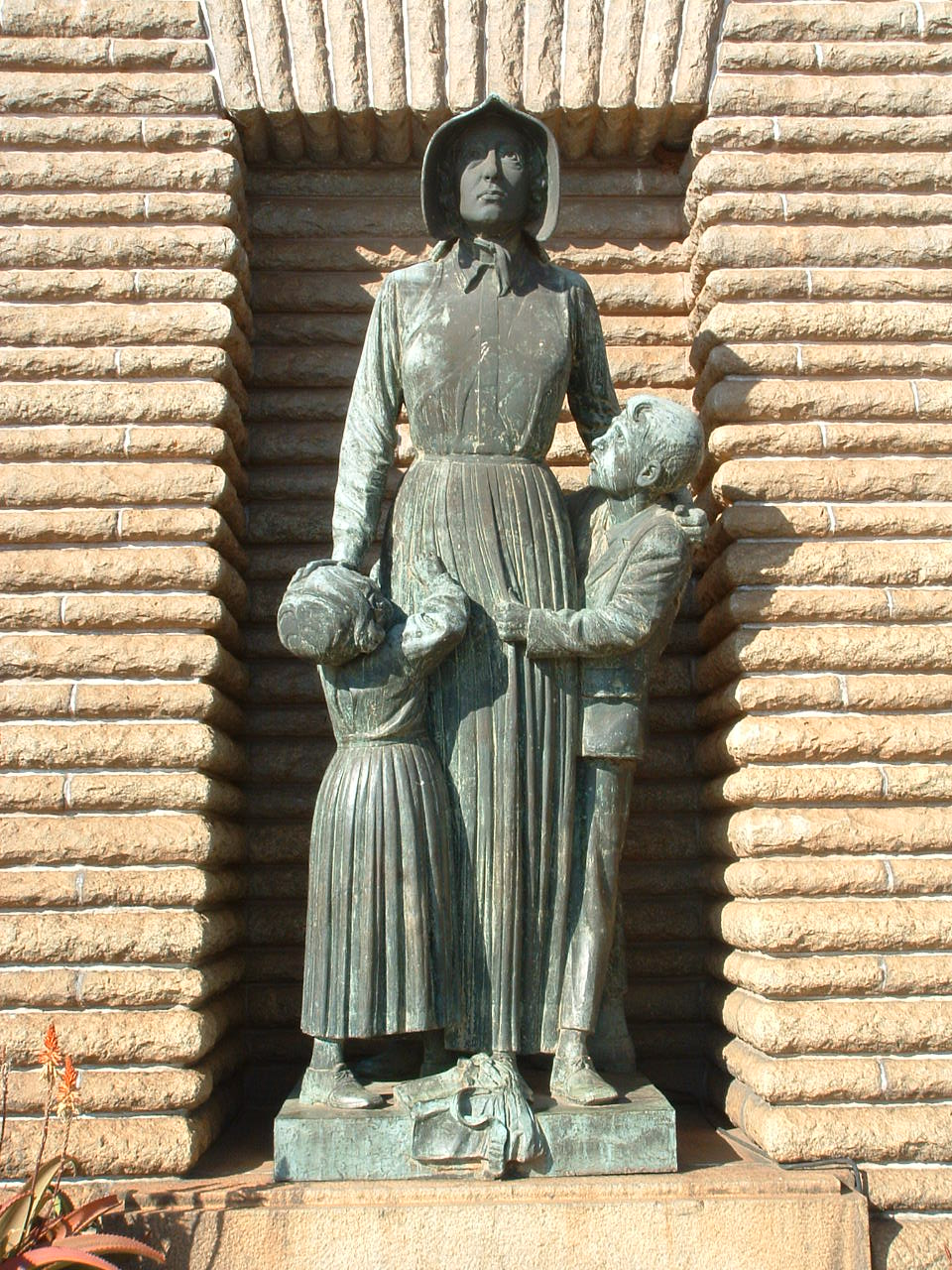
Voortrekker woman and children by Anton van Wouw

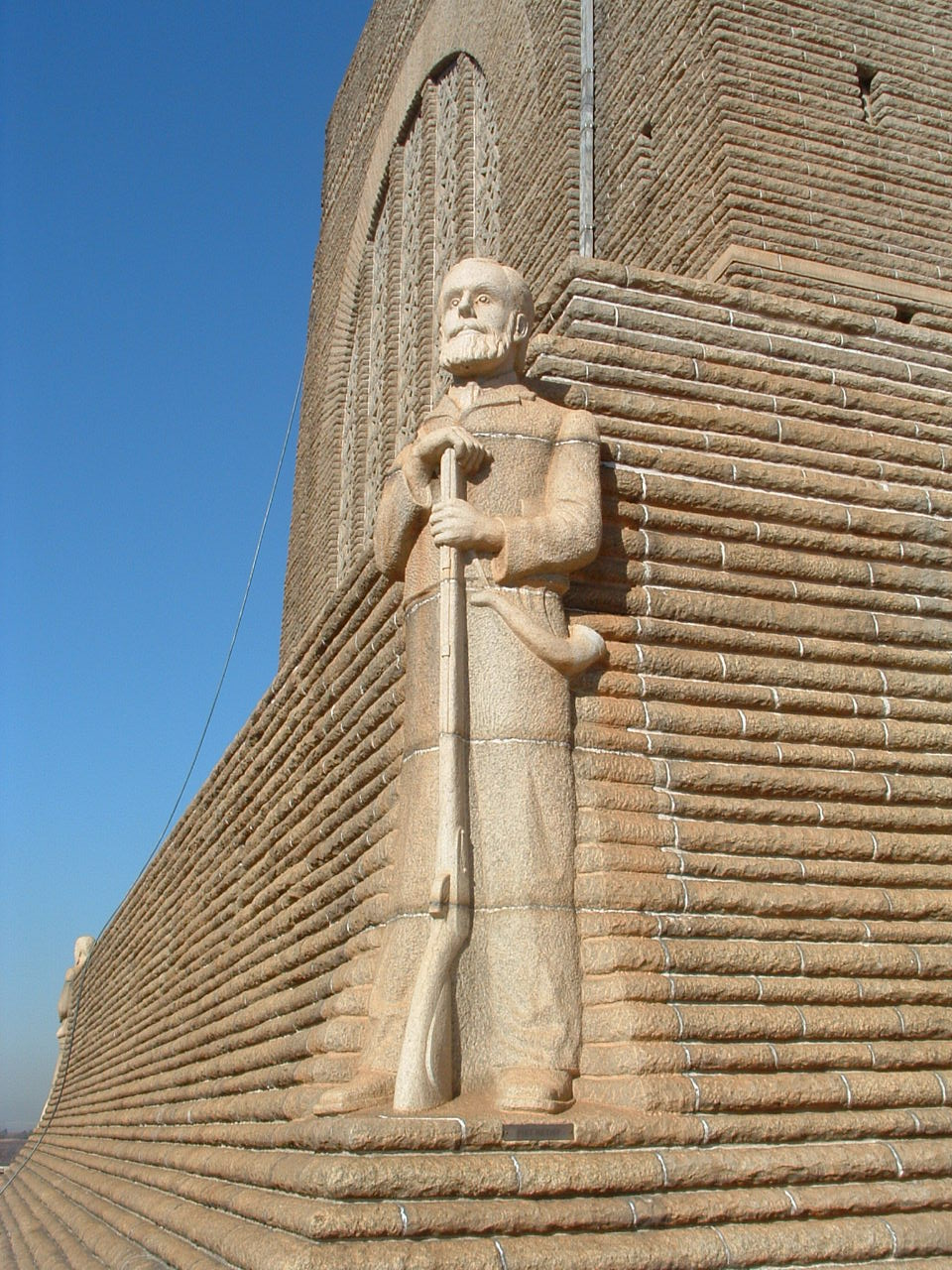
Statue of Piet Retief

At the foot of the monument stands Anton van Wouw's bronze sculpture of a Voortrekker woman and her two children, paying homage to the strength and courage of the Voortrekker women. On both sides of this sculpture black wildebeest are chiselled into the walls of the monument. The wildebeest symbolically depicts the dangers of Africa and their symbolic flight implies that the woman, carrier of Western civilisation, is triumphant.

On each outside corner of the monument there is a statue, respectively representing Piet Retief, Andries Pretorius, Hendrik Potgieter and an "unknown" leader (representative of all the other Voortrekker leaders). Each statue weighs approximately 6 tons.

At the eastern corner of the monument, on the same level as its entrance, is the foundation stone, under which there are buried a copy of the Trekker Vow of 16 December 1838, a copy of the anthem "Die Stem", and a copy of the land deal between the Trekkers under Piet Retief and the Zulus under king Dingane.

=== German links ===
According to Alta Steenkamp, the masonic subtext of the Monument to the Battle of the Nations (Völkerschlachtdenkmal) in Leipzig, Germany, is reflected in the Voortrekker Monument because the architect, Gerard Moerdijk, had used the geometric order and spatial proportions of the Völkerschlachtdenkmal. This Germanisation of the Voortrekker Monument occurred after Moerdijk's initial design had caused a public outcry in the South African press for its resemblance to an Egyptian temple. In Moerdijk's initial design, the monument consisted of a causeway linking two Egyptian obelisks.

Finalising his design of the Voortrekker Monument, Moerdijk visited Egypt in 1936, including the Karnak Temple Complex in Thebes. In Thebes, the pharaoh Akhenaten, Nefertiti's husband, had erected three sun sanctuaries, including the Hwt-benben ('mansion of the Benben'). The most prominent aspect of Moerdijk's monument is the annual mid noon sun illumination of the Benben stone, the encrypted cenotaph.

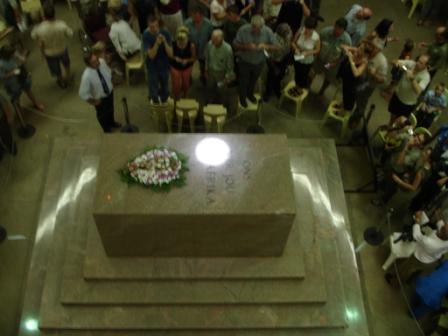
The cenotaph is the symbolic tomb of Piet Retief and his delegation.

In the years preceding World War II, several Afrikaner nationalists travelled to Germany for academic, political and cultural studies. In 1928 Moerdijk visited Germany, and viewed the Amarna bust of Nefertiti on public display in Berlin. By 1934 Chancellor Hitler had decided that Germany would not return the Amarna bust of Nefertiti to Egypt. He instead announced the intention to use the Amarna bust as the central show piece of the thousand years Third Reich, in a revitalised Berlin to be renamed Germania. Likewise Moerdijk's thousand years monument with Amarna sun symbol at its centre, became Afrikaner nationalists' centre show piece of their capital Pretoria.

=== Round floor opening ===
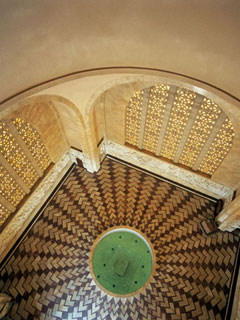
Looking from the sky dome downwards, 32 sun rays can be counted, reflecting the masonic influence of the architecture

Looking from the sky dome downwards, a chevron pattern on the floor of the Hall of Heroes, radiates outwards like 32 sun rays. In Moerdijk's architecture, the natural sun forms the 33rd ray through the floor opening. Moerdijk said the chevron pattern on the floor depicts water, as does the double chevron hieroglyph from the civilisation of ancient Egypt. Moerdijk stated that all roads on the terrain of building art lead back to ancient Egypt. Based on Moerdijk's reference to the watery floor of the Hall of Heroes, as well as his statements about ancient Egypt, the floor opening may be identified with the watery abyss, as in the creation theology of ancient African civilisation. Rising out of this watery abyss, was the primeval mound, the Benben stone, to symbolise a new creation.

=== Religious sun ray ===
Gerard Moerdijk was the chief architect of 80 Protestant churches in South Africa. Moerdijk adhered to Reformed church tradition and thus his Renaissance trademark, the Greek-cross floorplan, always focused on the pulpit and preacher. In Protestant theology, the word of God is central. Moerdijk created a similar central focus in the Voortrekker Monument, but in vertical instead of horizontal plane, and in African instead of European style.

The monument's huge upper dome features Egyptian backlighting to simulate the sky, the heavenly abode of God. Through the dome a sun ray penetrates downwards, highlighting words on 16 December at noon.

The sky oriented words: "WE FOR THEE, SOUTH AFRICA", are Moerdijk's focus point. These words are taken from an anthem, Die Stem: "We will live, we will die, we for thee South-Africa". The same anthem ends: "It will be well, God reigns."

Thus the sun ray simulates a connection between the words on the Cenotaph and the heavenly abode above, a communication between God and man.

The actual sun ray itself forms a 33rd sun ray shining onto the stone in the midst of floor opening.

=== Heavenly vow ===
In Moerdijk's biblical theology, God communicates in two ways: through scripture and nature. Moerdijk merges both methods, by using the sun in his simulation.

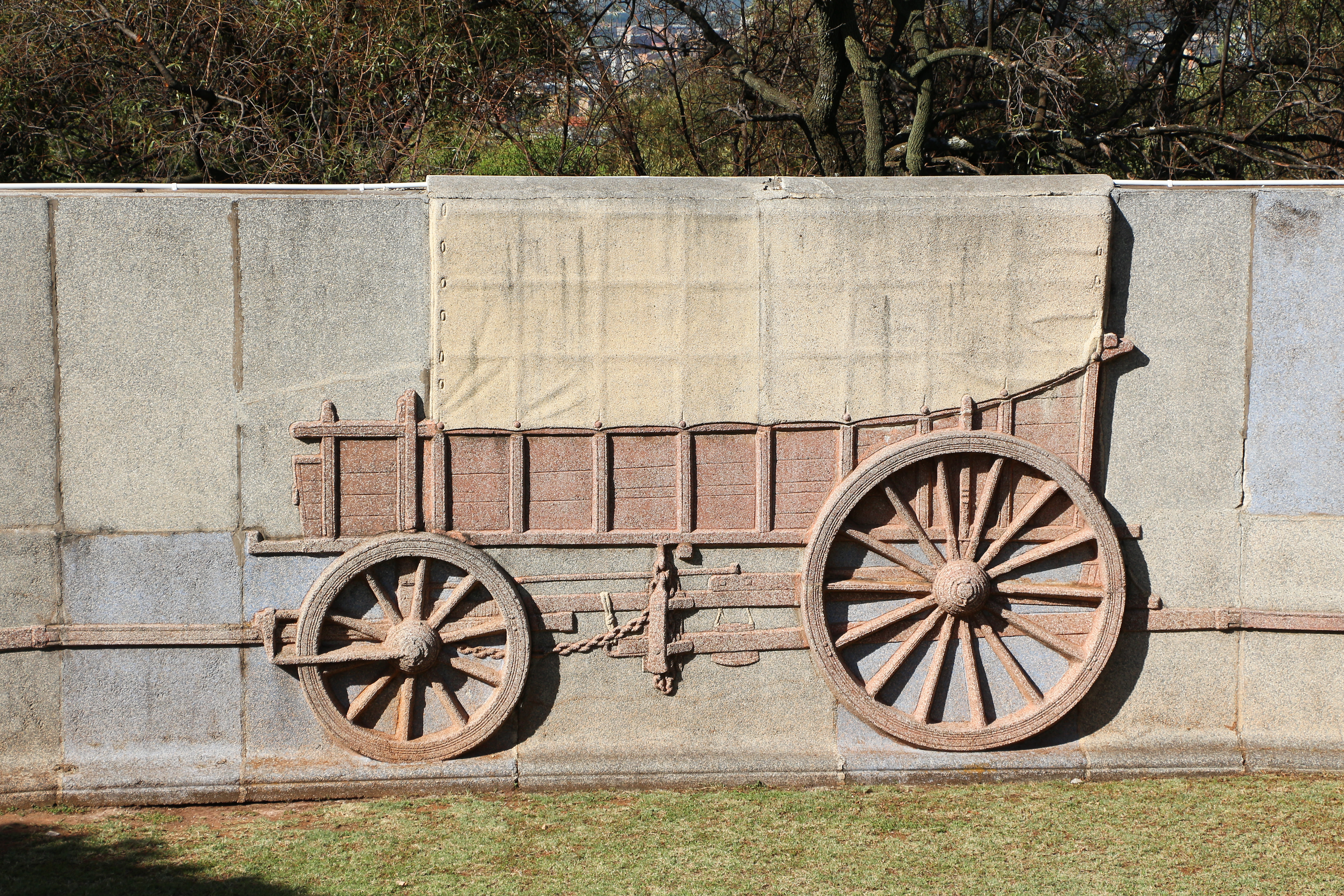
Relief of an ox-wagon on the laager wall

The Vow of the Trekkers was commemorated on 16 December as the Day of the Vow. On 16 December, the appearance of an illuminating sun disc on the wording of the Cenotaph stone, transform their meaning as per the Philosophers Stone of the alchemists.

Instead of man below making an earthly vow, the sun shifts the focus upwards to the trinitarian god of the Trekkers, as it is God who communicates through Moerdijk's sun architecture, making Himself a heavenly vow with the words: WE – as in GOD – FOR THEE SOUTH-AFRICA.

Thus God in the trinitarian tradition of the Trekkers, speaks a vow within the sun disc illuminating the words on the Cenotaph.

The Trekker belief that God was for South Africa originates from the 9–16 December 1838 vow of Trekker leader Andries Pretorius at Blood River, who at around the same time made military and political alliances with Christian Zulus like prince Mpande.

=== Egyptian origin ===
Moerdijk was an outspoken supporter of ancient Egyptian architecture.

Moerdijk referred to Africa's greatness as imparted by ancient Egyptian constructions at the inauguration of the Voortrekker Monument.

Before his Voortrekker Monument proposal was accepted, Moerdijk and Anton van Wouw had been working in alliance for many years on their "dream castle" project: a modern African-Egyptian Voortrekker Temple in South-Africa. Van Wouw and Frans Soff had earlier employed the Egyptian obelisk, a petrified ray of the African Aten, as central motif for the National Women's Monument in Bloemfontein, South Africa, itself likewise inaugurated on the Day of the Vow, 16 December 1913.

Whilst finalising the design of the Voortrekker Monument in 1936, Moerdijk went on a research trip to Egypt. There he visited the Karnak Temple Complex at Thebes, where an African Renaissance had flourished under Pharaoh Akhenaten, Nefertiti's husband.

The open air temples of Akhenaten to the Aten incorporated the Heliopolitan tradition of employing sun rays in architecture, as well as realistic wall reliefs or friezes.

Moerdijk also visited the Cairo Museum, where a copy of the Great Hymn to the Aten is on display, some verses of which remind of Psalm 104.

Moerdijk's wife Sylva related that he was intimately acquainted with ancient Egyptian architecture, and was strongly influenced architecturally by his visit to Egypt.

=== Architectural purpose ===
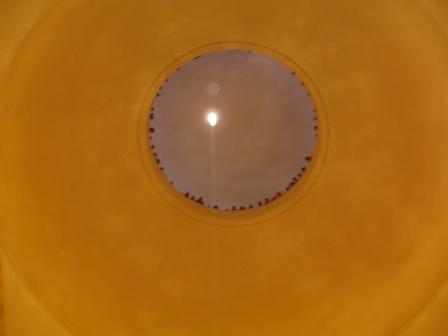
Looking upwards at mid noon on 16 December reveals a dot within a circle, the ancient African-Egyptian hieroglyph for the monotheistic creator god Aten

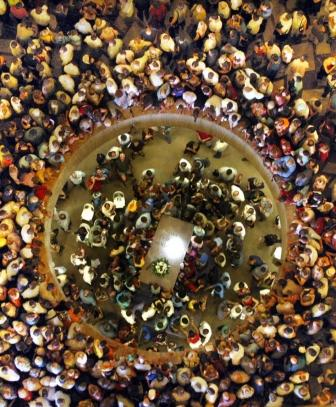
Looking downwards from the dome

The architect, Gerard Moerdijk, stated that the purpose of a building had to be clearly visible. The aspect of the sun at mid-noon in Africa, was during Nefertiti's time known as Aten. In Egyptian hieroglyphics, Aten was written as a sun dot enclosed by a circle.

The Aten-hieroglyph is depicted in the Voortrekker Monument when the sun shines through an aperture in the top dome.

Likewise, looking downwards from the top dome walkway, the round floor opening is seen to encircle the sun disc illumination.

Moerdijk's message as implied by the wall frieze: by exodus out of the British Cape Colony, God created a new civilisation inland.

In order to give thanks to this new creation of civilisation, Moerdijk, recalling Abraham of old, outwardly designed the Voortrekker Monument as an altar.

== Monument complex ==
In the years following its construction, the monument complex was expanded several times and now includes:

- An indigenous garden that surrounds the monument.
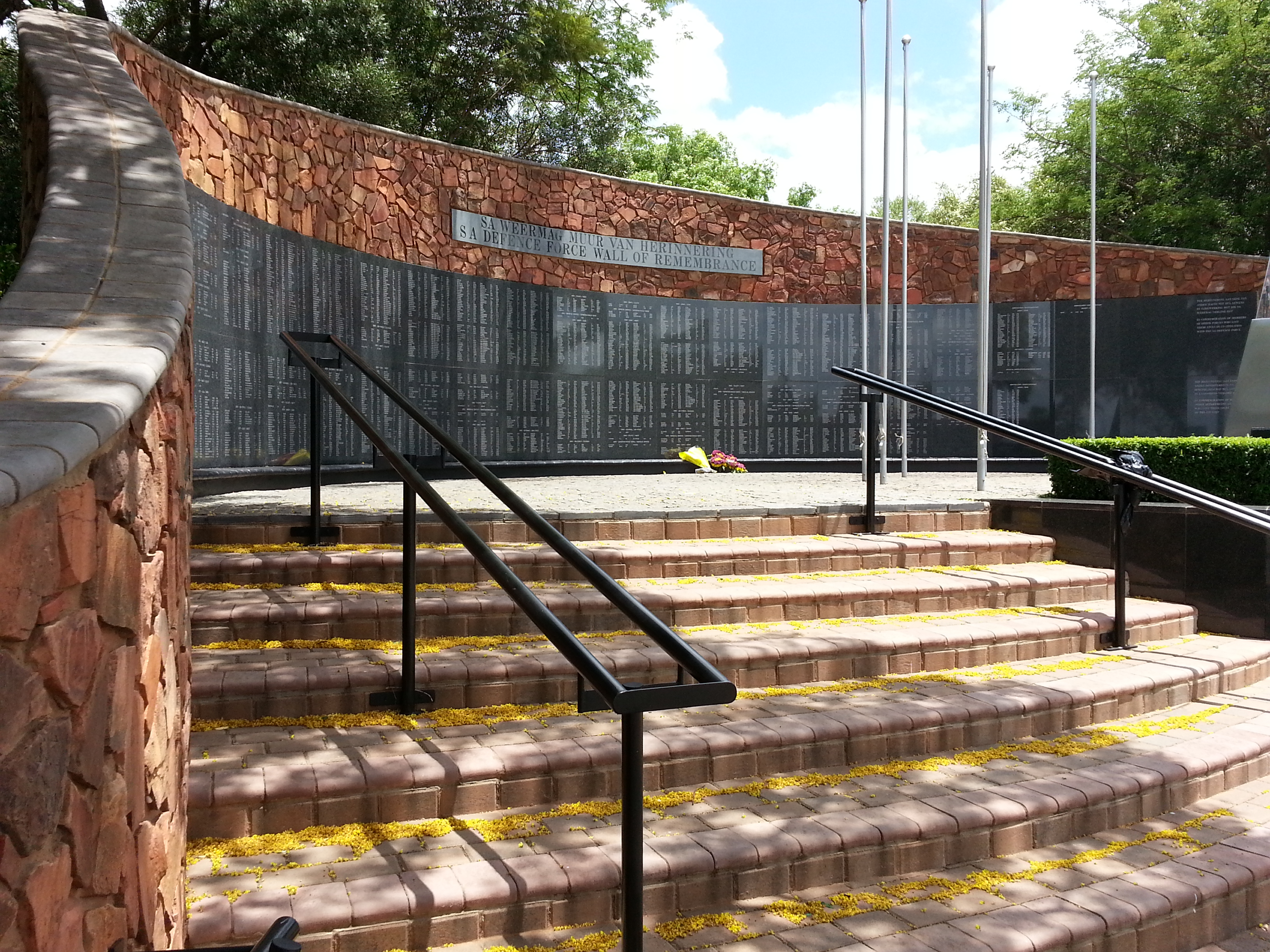
  The Wall of Remembrance dedicated to those who died while serving in the South African Defence Force (SADF).
- Fort Schanskop, a nearby fort built in 1897 by the government of the South African Republic after the Jameson Raid. It is currently a museum and was added to the monument complex in June 2000.
- The Schanskop open-air amphitheatre with seating for 357 people that was officially opened on 30 January 2001.
- A garden of remembrance.
- A nature reserve was declared on 3.41 km^{2} around the monument in 1992. Game found on the reserve include Zebras, Blesbok, Mountain Reedbuck, Springbok, Black Wildebeest and Impala.
- A Wall of Remembrance that was constructed near the monument in 2009. It was built to commemorate the members of the South African Defence Force (SADF) who died in service of their country between 1961 and 1994.
- A memorial was inaugurated in 2012 to commemorate the victims of the attacks on Air Rhodesia Flight 825 and Flight 827, dubbed the Viscount Disasters.
- An Afrikaner heritage centre, which was built in order to preserve the heritage of the Afrikaans-speaking portion of South Africa's population and their contribution to the history of the country.

== See also ==
- Great Trek
- Völkerschlachtdenkmal
