= Air Rhodesia Flight 825 =

Passenger aircraft which was shot down in 1978

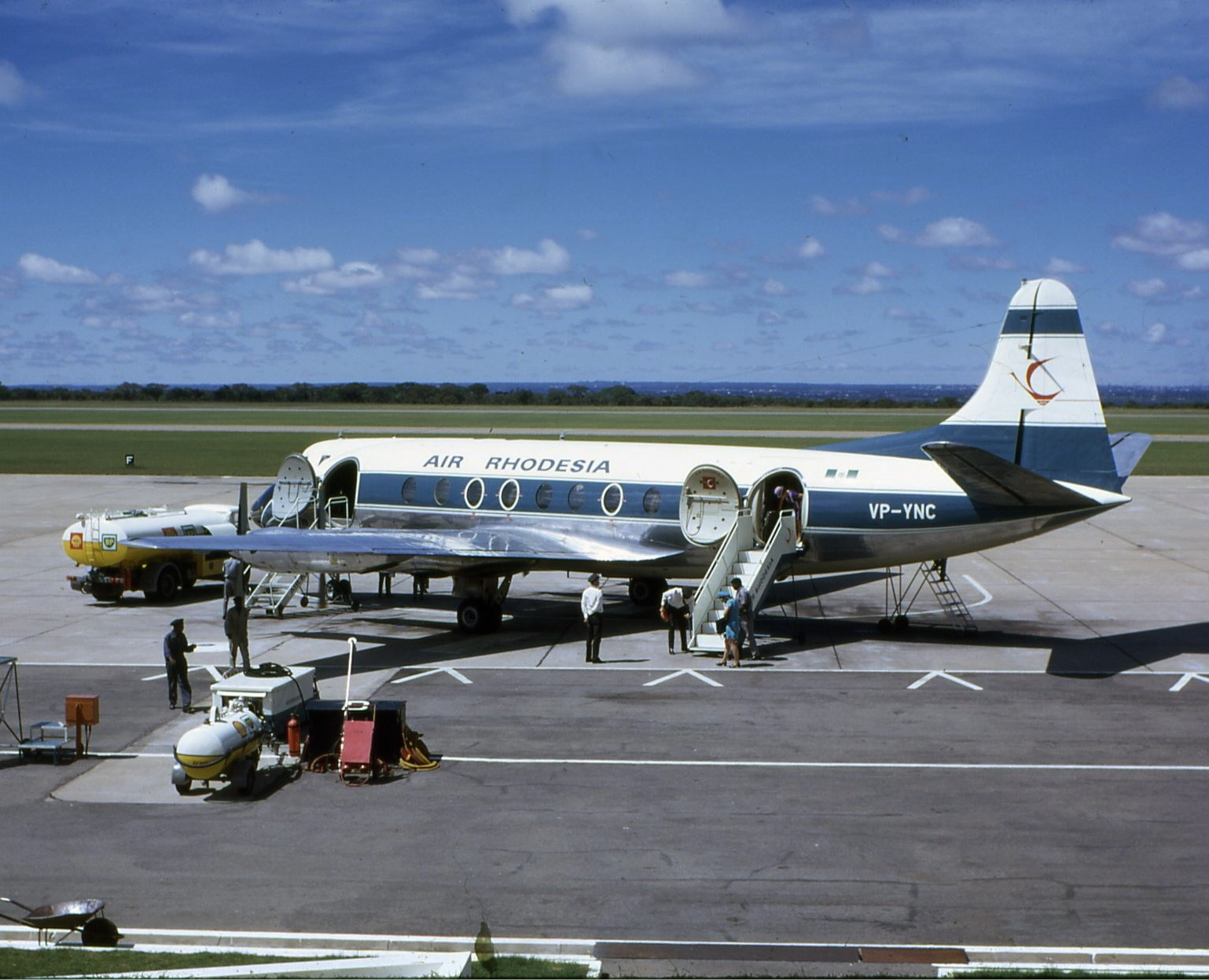
- An Air Rhodesia Vickers Viscount, similar to the one involved in the shootdown

Shootdown
- Date: 3 September 1978
- Summary: Airliner shootdown
- Site: 40 miles (64.3km) west of Karoi, Rhodesia (Note: The official name of the country under British law was Southern Rhodesia, but its government had used the shortened name Rhodesia since Northern Rhodesia's independence as Zambia in 1964. The name Zimbabwe has been used since 1980.); 16°47′S 29°5′E

Aircraft
- Aircraft type: Vickers Viscount 782D
- Aircraft name: Hunyani
- Operator: Air Rhodesia
- Registration: VP-WAS
- Flight origin: Victoria Falls, Rhodesia
- Last stopover: Kariba, Rhodesia
- Destination: Salisbury, Rhodesia
- Occupants: 56
- Passengers: 52
- Crew: 4
- Fatalities: 48 (38 in crash, 10 in massacre at the site)
- Survivors: 8

Air Rhodesia Flight 825 was a scheduled passenger flight that was allegedly shot down by the Zimbabwe People's Revolutionary Army (ZIPRA) on 3 September 1978, during the Rhodesian Bush War. The aircraft involved, a Vickers Viscount named the Hunyani, was flying the last leg of Air Rhodesia's regular scheduled service from Victoria Falls to the capital Salisbury, via the resort town of Kariba.

Soon after Flight 825 took off, a group of ZIPRA guerrillas hit it on its starboard wing with a Soviet-made Strela-2 surface-to-air infrared homing missile, critically damaging the aircraft and forcing an emergency landing. An attempted belly landing in a cotton field just west of Karoi was foiled by a ditch, which caused the plane to cartwheel and break up. Of the 52 passengers and four crew, 38 died in the crash; the insurgents then approached the wreckage, rounded up the 10 survivors they could see and massacred them with automatic gunfire. Three passengers survived by hiding in the surrounding bush, while a further five lived because they had gone to look for water before the guerrillas arrived.

ZIPRA leader Joshua Nkomo publicly claimed responsibility for shooting down the Hunyani in an interview with the BBC's Today programme the next day, saying the aircraft had been used for military purposes, but denied that his men had killed survivors on the ground. Most Rhodesians, both black and white, saw the attack as an act of terrorism. A fierce Rhodesian backlash followed against enemy strongholds and increased racial tension. Reports viewing the attack negatively appeared in international journals such as Time magazine, but there was almost no acknowledgement of it by overseas governments, much to the Rhodesian government's indignation.

Talks between Nkomo and Prime Minister Ian Smith, which had been progressing promisingly, were immediately suspended by the Rhodesians, with Smith calling Nkomo a "monster". On 10 September, Smith announced the extension of martial law over selected areas. The Rhodesian Security Forces launched several retaliatory strikes into Zambia and Mozambique over the following months, attacking both ZIPRA and its rival, the Zimbabwe African National Liberation Army (ZANLA). The attack on ZIPRA in particular brought great controversy as many of those killed were refugees camping in and around guerrilla positions. In February 1979, ZIPRA shot down Air Rhodesia Flight 827, another civilian flight, in an almost identical incident.

== Background ==
Rhodesia

A dispute over the terms for the granting of full sovereignty to the self-governing colony of Rhodesia led the colonial government, headed by Prime Minister Ian Smith, to unilaterally declare independence from the United Kingdom on 11 November 1965. The idea of "no independence before majority rule" had recently gained ground in Britain and elsewhere amid decolonisation, and Rhodesia's government was dominated by the country's white minority, so the unilateral declaration went unrecognised internationally. Britain and the United Nations imposed economic sanctions on Rhodesia.

Two rival communist-backed black nationalist groups initiated military campaigns to overthrow the government and introduce majority rule: the Chinese-aligned Zimbabwe African National Union (ZANU), mostly comprising Shonas, created the Zimbabwe African National Liberation Army (ZANLA) and adopted aspects of Maoist doctrine, while the Ndebele-dominated Zimbabwe African People's Union (ZAPU), aligned with Soviet-style Marxism–Leninism and the Warsaw Pact, mobilised the Zimbabwe People's Revolutionary Army (ZIPRA). These guerrilla armies proceeded to wage what they called the "Second Chimurenga" (Note: Chimurenga is a Shona word meaning "revolutionary struggle". The "First Chimurenga" in question is the Second Matabele War, fought by the Ndebele and Shona peoples (separately) against the administration of Cecil Rhodes' British South Africa Company between 1896 and 1897.) against the Rhodesian government and security forces. The resulting conflict, the Rhodesian Bush War, began on 4 July 1964.

After the security forces mounted a successful counter-insurgency campaign during 1973 and 1974, developments overseas caused the conflict's momentum to shift in the insurgents' favour. The leftist Carnation Revolution of April 1974 caused Portugal to withdraw its key economic support for Smith's administration, and led to Mozambique's independence the following year as a communist state openly allied with ZANU. Around the same time, Rhodesia's other main backer, South Africa, adopted a détente initiative that forced a ceasefire, giving the guerrillas time to regroup. Following the abortive Victoria Falls Conference of August 1975, Smith and the ZAPU leader Joshua Nkomo held unsuccessful talks between December 1975 and March 1976. ZANU and ZAPU announced in October 1976, during the run-up to the unsuccessful Geneva Conference in December, that they would henceforth attend conferences as a joint "Patriotic Front". (Note: Though the front superficially endured for the rest of the war, the two movements remained largely separate, with their respective guerrillas running their own campaigns and clashing on occasion. Under pressure from their overseas backers (the Frontline States), ZANLA and ZIPRA guerrillas had already been nominally fighting the Chimurenga together as the "Zimbabwe People's Army" (ZIPA) since early 1976. The uneasy, confused military co-operation did not last long; ZIPA was dead by the start of 1977.)

In March 1978, Smith and non-militant nationalist groups headed by Bishop Abel Muzorewa, the Reverend Ndabaningi Sithole and Chief Jeremiah Chirau agreed what became the "Internal Settlement". This created a joint black–white transitional government, with the country due to be reconstituted as Zimbabwe Rhodesia in 1979, pursuant to multiracial elections. ZANU and ZAPU were invited to participate, but refused; Nkomo sardonically dubbed Smith's black colleagues "the blacksmiths". ZANU proclaimed 1978 to be "The Year of the People" as the war continued. Officials from Muzorewa's United African National Council, sent to the provinces to explain the Internal Settlement to rural blacks, were killed by Marxist–Leninist guerrillas. Insurgents also began to target Christian missionaries, climaxing in the killing of nine British missionaries and four children at Elim Mission near the Mozambican border in the Vumba massacre on 23 June.

The transitional government was badly received abroad, partly because the Internal Settlement kept control of law enforcement, the military, the judiciary and the civil service under white control. No country recognised Rhodesia's interim administration. Smith again worked to bring Nkomo into the government, hoping this would lend it some credence domestically, prompt diplomatic recognition overseas, and help the security forces defeat ZANLA. Starting on 14 August 1978, he attended secret meetings with Nkomo in Lusaka, Zambia (where ZAPU was based), doing so with the assistance of the mining corporation Lonrho. Attempts were made to also involve the ZANU leader Robert Mugabe, but Mugabe would have no part in the talks. According to the South African military historian Jakkie Cilliers, negotiations between Smith and Nkomo progressed well and "seemed on the verge of success" by the start of September 1978. On 2 September, Smith and Nkomo revealed publicly that the secret meetings had taken place.

== Incident ==
=== Prior threats to Rhodesian air traffic ===
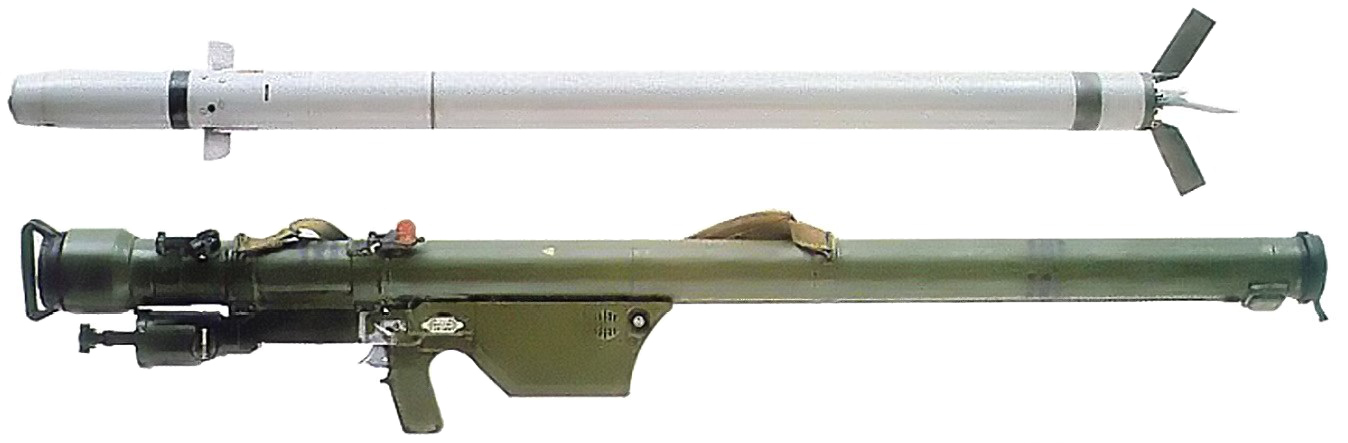
A Strela-2 surface-to-air missile launcher, and one of its missiles

Rhodesian air traffic was not seriously threatened until about 1977, in the latter stages of the war; before this time, neither revolutionary force had the weapons to launch a viable attack against an aerial target. The weapon that made such attacks feasible for ZIPRA was the Strela-2 shoulder-launched surface-to-air missile launcher, supplied by the Soviet Union from the mid-1970s as part of the Warsaw Pact's materiel support. (Note: ZANLA, aligned with China rather than the Soviets, never received such weapons. ZANLA's Mozambican ally, FRELIMO, did receive Soviet arms, and reportedly had Strela-2 launchers as early as 1973.) By September 1978, there had been 20 reported attempts to shoot down Rhodesian military aircraft using these weapons, none of which had been successful. Some Rhodesian Air Force Dakotas had been hit, but all had survived and landed safely. No civilian aircraft had yet been targeted during the Bush War.

=== Flight ===
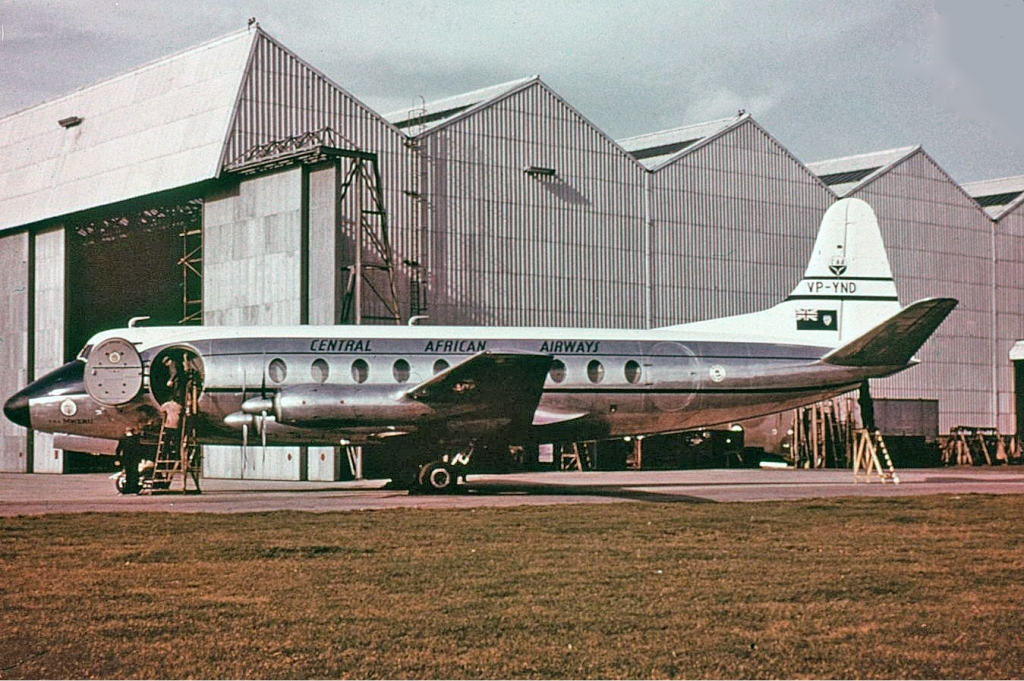
A Vickers Viscount of Central African Airways, Air Rhodesia's predecessor, in 1957

Air Rhodesia was the country's national airline, established by the government on 1 September 1967 to succeed Central African Airways, which was dissolved at the end of that year. Based at Salisbury Airport, Air Rhodesia's flight network during the late 1970s comprised a domestic programme of passenger and cargo flights, as well as international services to the South African cities of Johannesburg and Durban.

The Flight 825 aircraft was a Vickers Viscount 782D, a British-made turboprop aircraft with two engines on each wing. It was named the Hunyani after the river of the same name, which flowed between Lake Kariba and the Rhodesian capital Salisbury.

The Hunyani was on the second and final leg of its regular scheduled journey between Victoria Falls and Salisbury, stopping over in the resort town of Kariba. Despite the occasional rocket and mortar attacks launched on Kariba by ZIPRA guerrillas on the northern side of the Zambezi (in Zambia), the resort had endured as one of Rhodesia's choice tourist destinations. The flight on 3 September 1978, Sunday afternoon, from Kariba to Salisbury carried four crew members and 52 passengers, most of whom were holidaymakers from Salisbury, returning home after a weekend at the lake. The flight took off from Kariba Airport on schedule soon after 17:00 Central Africa Time.

Flight 825 was piloted by 36-year-old Captain John Hood, a native of Bulawayo who had gained his commercial pilot licence in 1966. He had flown Viscounts for Air Rhodesia since 1968, and had also served in the Rhodesian Air Force on a voluntary basis. His first officer, Garth Beaumont, was 31 years old, and had lived in Rhodesia for most of his life, having immigrated as a child from South Africa. The two air stewardesses were Dulcie Esterhuizen, 21 years old and from Bulawayo, and 23-year-old Louise Pearson, from Salisbury.

=== Shootdown ===
Flight 825 was shot down soon after taking off from Kariba.

A group of ZIPRA guerrillas, armed with a Strela-2 launcher, waited in the bush beneath Flight 825's flightpath, and fired on the Hunyani about five minutes after it took off, while the aircraft was still in the climb phase of its flight. The heat-seeking missile hit the plane's starboard wing and exploded, causing the inner engine to also explode. A fuel tank and hydraulic lines ruptured, creating a fire that could not be put out. The second starboard engine failed almost immediately, leaving Hood with only his two port engines. Heaving wildly, the Hunyani began to descend rapidly.

At 17:10 Captain Hood sent a distress call to air traffic control, informing them that he had lost the two starboard engines and was going to crash. "We're going in," he radioed. Telling his passengers to brace for an emergency landing, he aimed for an open field of cotton in the Whamira Hills, in the bush to the west of Karoi, intending to belly land the craft. The landing was relatively stable until the Hunyani hit a ditch, cartwheeled and exploded. The remaining fuel tanks ruptured and caught fire, setting the wrecked cabin ablaze.

=== Massacre on the ground ===
Of the 56 people on board, 38, including Hood and Beaumont, died in the crash. Eighteen survived, albeit with injuries, and climbed out of the wreckage. After briefly settling the others, one of the passengers, Cecil MacLaren, led four others—young newlyweds Robert and Shannon Hargreaves, Sharon Coles, and her four-year-old daughter Tracey—off in the direction of a nearby village in search of water. The other 13 remained close to the wreckage. Meanwhile, nine guerrillas made their way towards the crash site, and reached it at about 17:45. Three of the 13 survivors remaining at the crash site hid on seeing figures approaching: Rhodesian Army reservist Anthony Hill, 39, took cover in the surrounding bush, while businessman Hans Hansen and his wife Diana did the same. This left 10 passengers in full view near the wreckage, including four women and two girls (aged 11 and 4).

The guerrillas, who were armed with AK-47 rifles, presented themselves to the 10 passengers as friendly, saying they would summon help and bring water. They spoke in English, both to the survivors and among themselves. They told the passengers to congregate around a point a few metres from the wreckage; when the survivors said that some of them were too badly injured to walk, the insurgents told the able-bodied men to carry the others. The passengers were assembled into an area of about 10 square metres (110 ft^{2}). Standing roughly 15 metres (49 ft) away, the cadres now raised their weapons. "You have taken our land," one of them said. "Please don't shoot us!" one of the passengers cried, just before they were killed by a sustained burst of automatic gunfire. Those that survived the initial bursts were bayoneted (including a mother and her 3-week-old baby). (Note: Hidden in the bush surrounding the crash site, Hill and the Hansens avoided being spotted by the cadres, but were still close enough to see and hear what was happening by the plane wreckage. They reported this final exchange between the guerrillas and the remaining passengers in newspaper interviews.)

Having collected water from the nearby village, MacLaren and his companions were almost back at the crash site when they heard the shots. Thinking it was personal ammunition in the luggage exploding in the heat, they continued on their way, and called out to the other passengers, who they thought were still alive. This alerted the insurgents to the presence of more survivors; one of the guerrillas told MacLaren's group to "come here". The insurgents then opened fire on their general location, prompting MacLaren and the others to flee. Hill and the Hansens also ran; they revealed their positions to the fighters in their haste, but successfully hid themselves behind a ridge. After Hill and the others had hidden there for about two hours, they saw the attackers return to the crash site at about 19:45. The guerrillas looted the wrecked cabin and some of the suitcases strewn around the site, filled their arms with passengers' belongings, then left again.

The survivors were found over the following days by the Rhodesian Army and police; Hill and the Hansens were taken to Kariba Hospital, while MacLaren and his group were airlifted to Andrew Fleming Hospital in Salisbury.

=== Nkomo claims responsibility, but denies killing survivors ===
Nkomo claimed responsibility for the attack in an interview with the BBC's Today radio programme the next day, reportedly laughing as he did so, to the horror of most Rhodesian observers, both black and white. (Note: Nkomo asserted in his 1984 memoirs that he had laughed because of his evasiveness during the interview. Hoping to avoid discussion of ZIPRA armaments, he had just told the BBC reporter that his men had downed the Viscount by throwing rocks at it. According to an anecdote reproduced in Paul Donovan's history of the BBC's Today programme, during his interview with reporter Tony Wilkinson on BBC Today, it was discovered that Nkomo had a faulty tape, to which Wilkinson had to ring him twice. On the retake, Nkomo was asked again whether or not the flight had been shot down by his men. Having already claimed responsibility for the attack on the first take, Nkomo was heard chuckling, amused by the technical difficulties and having to repeat a second time his prior revelation to Wilkinson.) He said that he had received intelligence that the Hunyani was being used for military purposes. Nkomo said he regretted the deaths as it was not his party's policy to kill civilians, and denied that his men had killed any survivors on the ground; by contrast, he said that his men had helped them, and had left them alive. He also accused Air Rhodesia of surreptitiously hauling troops and war materiel for the government, an allegation that Captain Pat Travers, Air Rhodesia's general manager, called a "downright, deliberate lie". Nkomo's chuckle was interpreted in the British press "as an example of Nkomo's callousness", with an editorial by The Sun stating that "the mask has slipped from the face of Rhodesian guerilla leader Joshua Nkomo" and described the interview as "sickening".

According to Eliakim Sibanda, a professor and human rights speaker who wrote a history of ZAPU, Nkomo was implying that responsibility for the massacre lay with Security Forces pseudo-guerrillas, more specifically the Selous Scouts unit, which had often been accused of brutalising rural civilians with the goal of shifting public opinion. Sibanda asserts that the massacre "cannot be put beyond" the Scouts, and also supports Nkomo's claim that the Hunyani had been used militarily, suggesting that ZIPRA might have believed there to be Rhodesian soldiers on board. "Rhodesian television, before attacks on ZANLA in Mozambique, had shown Viscounts ferrying paratroopers for the job," he writes, "... [and] ZIPRA intelligence knew there were paratroopers stationed [at Victoria Falls]".

== Reactions ==
=== Racial tensions ===
A report published in the American magazine Time a fortnight later described the incident as "a genuine horror story, calculated to make the most alarming of Rhodesian doomsday prophecies seem true." The white community in Rhodesia heard the news with fury, and many turned their minds to exacting retribution for what they and many others saw as an act of terrorism. The prominent Indian-Rhodesian Gulab family was particularly affected by the incident, having lost eight members in the attack. Although Rhodesian authorities did not immediately acknowledge the cause of the crash, doing so only after four days' investigation, the truth was common knowledge in Salisbury within hours. Smith wrote in his memoirs that the "degree of anger ... [was] difficult to control". White South Africans were similarly enraged, particularly after reports appeared in the South African press that the killers had raped the female passengers before massacring them. A Friends of Rhodesia Society in South Africa offered a reward of R100,000 to anybody who would either kill Nkomo or bring him to Salisbury to stand trial.

Geoffrey Nyarota, who was then one of the few black reporters at the Rhodesia Herald newspaper, later wrote in his memoirs that many whites became resentful and wary towards blacks in general, believing them all to be "terrorist sympathisers". Describing the Herald newsroom the night of the incident, he relates a "vile collective temper" among the white sub-editors: "They cursed until their voices became hoarse, threatening dire consequences for all "terrs" and "munts" or "kaffirs"... I sensed that some of the more derogatory remarks made in unnecessarily loud voices that evening were meant specifically for my ears."

Several racially motivated incidents occurred over the following days. According to the Time article, a group of whites entered an unsegregated Salisbury bar "fingering the triggers of rifles" and forced blacks drinking there to leave. Time also reported a rumour that two white youths, on learning of the massacre, shot the first black man they saw. Smith says that several would-be vigilante groups sought his permission to venture into the bush around the crash site to "make the local people pay for their crime of harbouring and assisting the terrorists". He instructed them not to, according to his memoirs, telling them that many rural blacks only assisted the guerrillas under extreme duress, and that it would not do to attack them. Many Rhodesians also resented the apparent lack of sympathy emanating from overseas governments, especially considering the character of the attack and its civilian target.

=== Memorial service, 8 September 1978 ===
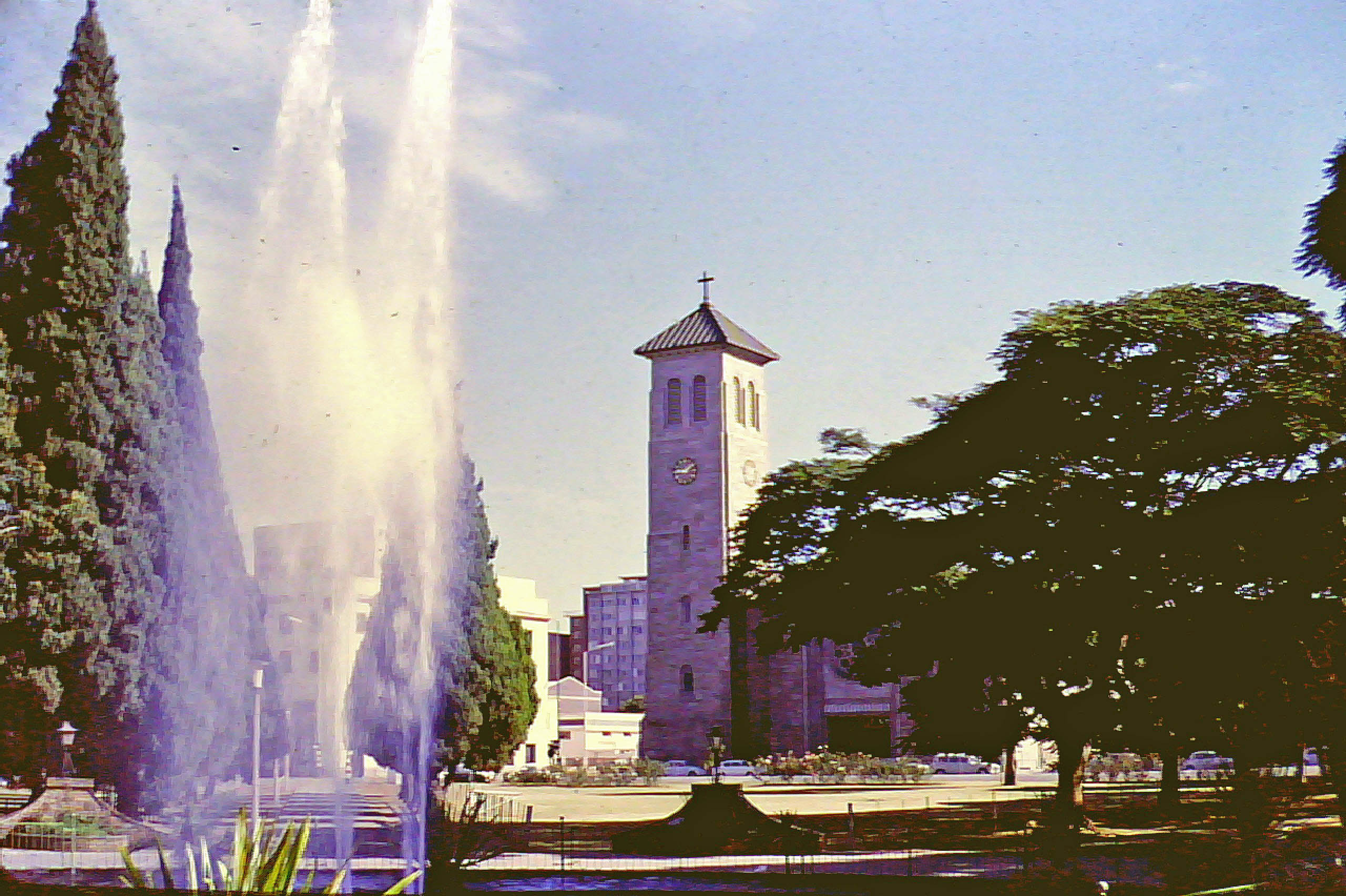
The Anglican Cathedral of St Mary and All Saints in Salisbury was the location of the memorial service on 8 September 1978.

At a memorial service held on 8 September 1978 for Flight 825's passengers and crew at Salisbury's Anglican Cathedral, about 2,000 people crowded inside, with another 500 standing outside on the steps and pavement, many listening to the service inside on portable radio sets. Prominent among those present in the cathedral were uniformed Air Rhodesia and South African Airways personnel, as well as Rhodesian Special Air Service soldiers and senior officers from other military units. Smith and several government ministers also attended, including P K van der Byl, the co-Minister of Foreign Affairs.

Dean John de Costa gave a sermon criticising what he described as a "deafening silence" from overseas. "Nobody who holds sacred the dignity of human life can be anything but sickened at the events attending the Viscount", he said. "But are we deafened with the voice of protest from nations who call themselves civilised? We are not! Like men in the story of the Good Samaritan, they pass by on the other side... The ghastliness of this ill-fated flight from Kariba will be burnt upon our memories for years to come. For others, far from our borders, it is an intellectual matter, not one which affects them deeply. Here is the tragedy!"

=== Smith–Nkomo talks halted ===
The talks between Smith and the ZAPU leader that had been progressing so promisingly were immediately halted by Salisbury. Smith himself called Nkomo a "monster". Cilliers comments that the ending of the Smith–Nkomo talks at this time was "potentially the most serious result of the Viscount massacre", as the talks had been progressing well before the incident. He surmises that an agreement between the two "at this critical stage" might have helped the transitional Rhodesian government to secure international recognition.

On 10 September, the Prime Minister announced to the nation that certain areas of the country would be placed under a variation of martial law, which he said would be applied in particular regions as and when needed. He declared Rhodesia's intent to "liquidate the internal workings of those organisations associated with terrorism", and warned neighbouring countries to prepare for "any defensive strikes we might undertake" against guerrilla bases in their respective territories. He claimed that the war had escalated because Britain and the United States were supporting the Patriotic Front. William Irvine, the co-Minister of Transport, warned the guerrillas that Rhodesia "w[ould] not let these innocents go unavenged".

== Rhodesian military response ==
=== Operation Snoopy ===
Because ZAPU and ZIPRA were based in Zambia, many Rhodesians clamoured for a massive retaliatory strike against terrorist targets in that country, but the first external target hit by the security forces following the Viscount shootdown was the prominent cluster of ZANLA bases around Chimoio in Mozambique. The Rhodesian military had struck these bases extensively in November 1977 during Operation Dingo, destroying much of the ZANLA presence there, but the insurgents had since built a complex called "New Chimoio", slightly to the east; the new camps were distributed across a far larger area than the originals. In a combined airborne-ground assault called Operation Snoopy, the Rhodesian Air Force, Rhodesian Light Infantry and Special Air Service wiped out much of New Chimoio on 20 September 1978. Mozambique sent armour to ZANLA's aid in the form of nine Soviet-made T-54 tanks and four Russian BTR-152 armoured personnel carriers, but the former were routed and one of the latter destroyed by the Rhodesian security forces. According to Rhodesian figures, there were "several hundred" guerrillas killed, while the security forces lost only two soldiers, one of whom was accidentally killed by a friendly air strike.

Rhodesia then attacked ZIPRA's bases in Zambia, in what Group Captain Peter Petter-Bowyer later described as "payback time" for Flight 825.

=== Operation Gatling ===
Westlands Farm (or Freedom Camp) was ZIPRA's headquarters and Operation Gatling's main target.

Operation Gatling was launched on 19 October 1978. It was another joint-force operation between the Air Force and the Army, which contributed Rhodesian Special Air Service and Rhodesian Light Infantry paratroopers. Operation Gatling's primary target, just 16 kilometres (10 miles) north-east of central Lusaka, was the formerly white-owned Westlands Farm, which had been transformed into ZIPRA's main headquarters and training base under the name "Freedom Camp". ZIPRA presumed that Rhodesia would never dare to attack a site so close to Lusaka. About 4,000 guerrillas underwent training at Freedom Camp, with senior ZIPRA staff also on site. The Rhodesian operation's other targets were Chikumbi, 19 kilometres (12 miles) north of Lusaka, and Mkushi Camp; all three were to be attacked more or less simultaneously in a coordinated sweep across Zambia. Assaulting targets deep inside Zambia was a first for the Rhodesian forces; previously only guerrillas near the border had been attacked.

Led by Squadron Leader Chris Dixon, who identified himself to Lusaka Airport tower as "Green Leader", a Rhodesian Air Force group flew into Zambia at very low altitudes (thereby avoiding Zambian radar) and took control of the country's airspace for about a quarter of an hour during the initial assault on Westlands Farm, informing Lusaka tower that the attack was against "Rhodesian dissidents, and not against Zambia", and that Rhodesian Hawker Hunters were circling the Zambian airfields under orders to shoot down any fighter that attempted to take off. The Zambians obeyed all of Green Leader's instructions, made no attempt to resist and temporarily halted civil air traffic. Using Rufunsa airstrip in eastern Zambia as a forward base, the Rhodesian military suffered only minor casualties during the three-day operation, and afterwards claimed to have killed over 1,500 ZIPRA personnel, as well as some Cuban instructors.

Historians Paul Moorcraft and Peter McLaughlin write that this exaggerated considerably the number of guerrillas killed, as most of Nkomo's army, then numbering about 10,000 fighters, had not been touched. On the other hand, unarmed refugees often camped in or around insurgent positions, and hundreds of these had been killed in the Rhodesian raid. Moorcraft and McLaughlin comment that for the Rhodesian airmen, it would have been "impossible to distinguish innocent refugees from young ZIPRA recruits." Sibanda describes Freedom Camp as "a refugee camp for boys", and says "351 boys and girls" were killed. He claims that the Red Cross and the UN Refugee Agency "confirmed ZAPU's claim that Smith's forces struck at defenseless, civilian trainees".

== Aftermath ==
The Rhodesian attacks on ZANLA and ZIPRA bases did much to restore the morale of the Rhodesian people following the Viscount incident, though they had not made much impact on the respective guerrilla campaigns. Nkomo and the Zambian President Kenneth Kaunda all the same requested further military aid and better weapons from the Soviets and the British respectively. Martial law was quickly extended across Rhodesia's rural areas, and covered three-quarters of the country by the end of 1978. Air Rhodesia, meanwhile, began developing anti-Strela shielding for its Viscounts. Before this work was completed, ZIPRA shot down a second Viscount, Air Rhodesia Flight 827, on 12 February 1979. This time there were no survivors.

Following the second shootdown, Air Rhodesia created a system whereby the underside of the Viscounts would be coated with low-radiation paint, with the exhaust pipes concurrently shrouded. According to tests conducted by the Air Force, a Viscount so treated could not be detected by the Strela's targeting system once it was over 2,000 feet (610 m). There were no further Viscount shootdowns in Rhodesia.

In the elections held the following year under the Internal Settlement terms, boycotted by ZANU and ZAPU, Muzorewa won a majority, and became the first Prime Minister of the reconstituted, majority-ruled state of Zimbabwe Rhodesia on 1 June 1979. This new order failed to win international acceptance, however, and in December 1979 the Lancaster House Agreement was agreed in London by Zimbabwe Rhodesia, the UK government and the Patriotic Front, returning the country to its former colonial status. The UK government suspended the constitution and took direct control for an interim period. Fresh elections were won by Mugabe, who took power in April 1980, concurrently with the country's recognised independence as Zimbabwe.

== Legacy and memorial ==
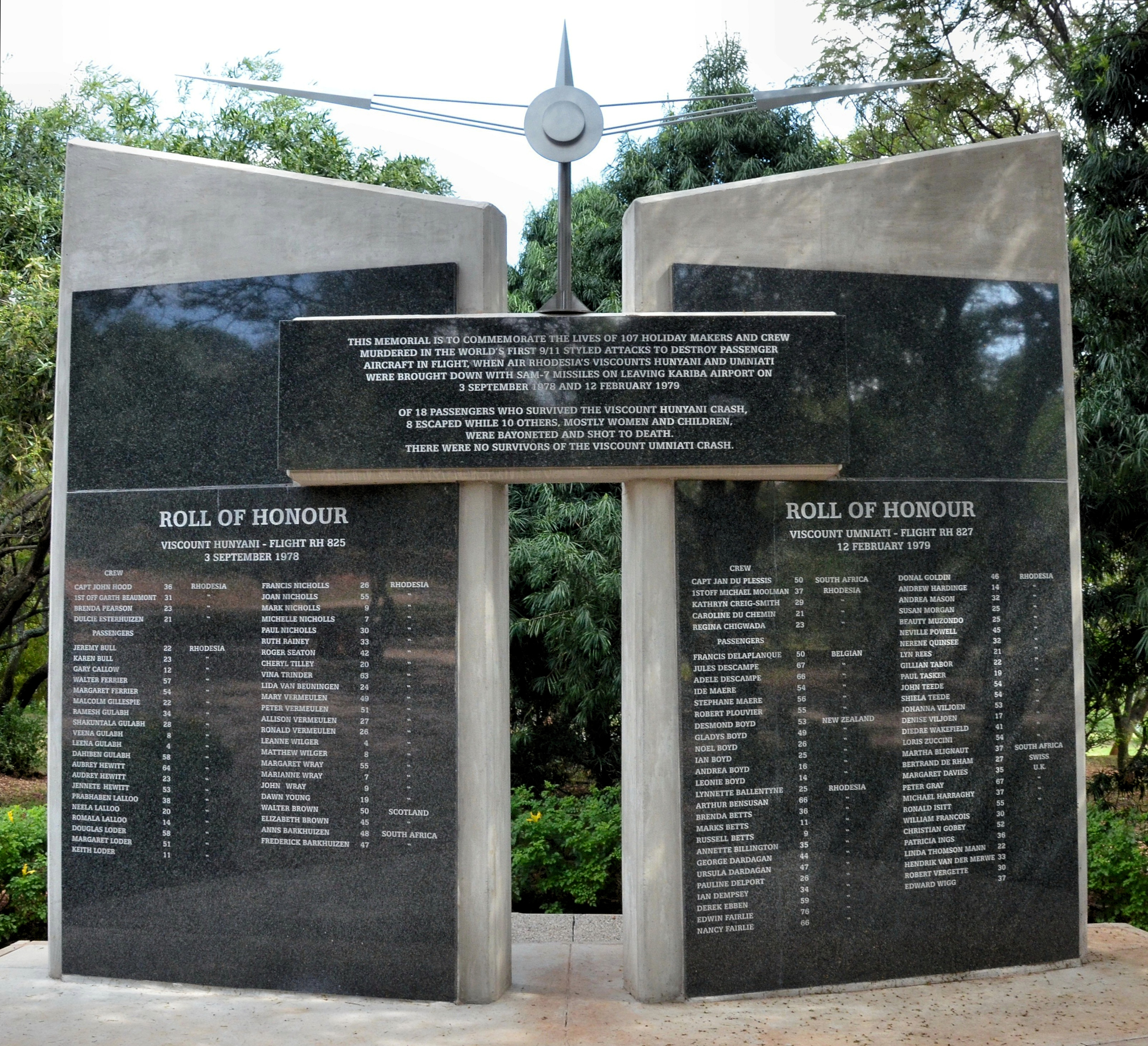
Viscount Memorial, erected in 2012 on the grounds of the Voortrekker Monument in Pretoria, South Africa

A memorial to the victims of the two Rhodesian Viscount incidents, dubbed the Viscount Memorial, was erected on the grounds of the Voortrekker Monument in Pretoria, South Africa, in 2012, and inaugurated on 1 September that year. The names of the dead passengers and crew are engraved on two granite slabs that stand upright, side by side, the pair topped by an emblem symbolising an aircraft.

A British parliamentary motion put forward by Labour MP Kate Hoey in February 2013 to retrospectively condemn the Viscount attacks and memorialise the victims on the anniversary of the second shootdown was labelled a "Rhodie motion" by the Herald, characterising it as an attempt to antagonise the Mugabe administration and its supporters. Dumiso Dabengwa, a former ZIPRA commander, described the move as a provocation motivated by race that went against the spirit of the amnesty enacted at Lancaster House. Christopher Mutsvangwa, a diplomat and political analyst, took a similar line, calling Hoey's proposed commemoration "a provocation ... [that] means they only regard the death of white people alone during the struggle. There is no mention of what happened to our sons and daughters in and outside the country." ZAPU's official response to Hoey's motion included the assertion that in all conflicts "civilians get caught up in cross-fires due to faulty intelligence reports and other communication errors", and juxtaposed the civilians killed in the Viscount shootdowns with those killed at Chikumbi. For its part, ZIPRA characterised its downing of civilian planes as a legitimate act of war on the grounds that the guerrillas might have believed them to have military personnel or equipment on board.

In his 1984 memoirs, Nkomo repeated his claim that ZIPRA fighters had helped the crash survivors, and wrote simply that "I truly have no idea" how the ten crash survivors died. Of the BBC interview in which he laughed whilst claiming responsibility for the crash, he wrote, "the interviewee had asked about what we used to down the planes and I said stones, jokingly in an attempt to avoid answering the question due to military intelligence which demanded secrecy regarding what type of weapons we had acquired from the Soviet Union. They remembered the laugh and not the regret for the shooting down of both aircraft."

== Notes and references ==
=== Newspaper and journal articles ===
- Lindsell-Stewart, Gavin (5 September 1978). "Three Describe a Night of Terror". The Rhodesia Herald. Salisbury: Argus Group: 1.
- Machona, Goodson (31 July 1998). "Mugabe honours fallen heroes". The Post. Lusaka.
- Phiri, Brighton; Phiri, Reuben (4 August 1998). "KK left out of Chikumbi massacre memorial". The Post. Lusaka.
- Platts, Clare (6 September 1978). "Newlyweds Tell of Crash Nightmare". The Rhodesia Herald. Salisbury: Argus Group: 1.
- "Search on for killers of survivors". Daily Record. Ellensburg, Washington: James J McGiffin: 6. 5 September 1978.
- "Shot at Point Blank Range". The Rhodesia Herald. Salisbury: Argus Group: 1. 5 September 1978.
- "Hundreds Mourn Crash Victims: Emotional scenes at services". The Rhodesia Herald. Salisbury: Argus Group: 1. 9 September 1978.
- "Seeds of Political Destruction". Time. New York. 18 September 1978. Archived from the original on 7 March 2008.
- "Air Rhodesia Corporation". Flight International. London: 1343. 28 April 1979.
- "Rhodesia reverts to British rule". London: BBC. 11 December 1979.
- "Early day motion 1552: Vumba Massacre". London: House of Commons of the United Kingdom. 13 May 2008.
- "Inauguration of the Viscount Memorial in the VTM Garden of Statues" (PDF). Flying Spirit. Vol. 3, no. 3. Valhalla, South Africa: South African Air Force Association. October 2012. p. 2. Archived from the original (PDF) on 8 October 2019.
- "Viscount Memorial Services 2nd September 2012" (PDF). Contact! Contact!. Tauranga, New Zealand: Rhodesian Services Association. October 2012. pp. 21–22.
- "House of Commons Rhodie Motion Raises Stink". The Herald. Harare: Government of Zimbabwe. 11 February 2013.
- "House of Commons Rhodie Motion 'A Racist Stance'". The Herald. Harare: Government of Zimbabwe. 12 February 2013.
- "ZAPU's response to Kate Hoey's condemnation on the Viscount disaster". Bulawayo: Zimbabwe African People's Union. 12 February 2013. Archived from the original on 20 December 2013.

=== Bibliography ===
- Alexander, Yonah; Sochor, Eugene, eds. (1990). Aerial Piracy and Aviation Security. Leiden: Brill Publishers. ISBN 978-0-7923-0932-1.
- Binda, Alexandre (2007). Heppenstall, David (ed.). Masodja: The History of the Rhodesian African Rifles and its forerunner the Rhodesian Native Regiment. Johannesburg: 30° South Publishers. ISBN 978-1-920143-03-9.
- Binda, Alexandre (2008). The Saints: The Rhodesian Light Infantry. Johannesburg: 30° South Publishers. ISBN 978-1-920143-07-7.
- Chikuhwa, Jacob (2004). A Crisis of Governance: Zimbabwe (First ed.). New York: Algora Publishing. ISBN 978-0-87586-286-6.
- Cilliers, Jakkie (1984). Counter-Insurgency in Rhodesia. London, Sydney & Dover, New Hampshire: Croom Helm. ISBN 978-0-7099-3412-7.
- Donovan, Paul (1998) [1997]. All Our Todays: Forty Years of Radio 4's Today Programme. London: Arrow Books. ISBN 978-0-09-928037-8.
- Freeman, Charles (1981). Terrorism. Today's World. London: Batsford Academic and Educational Limited. ISBN 978-0-7134-1230-7.
- Gowlland-Debbas, Vera (1990). Collective Responses to Illegal Acts in International Law: United Nations action in the question of Southern Rhodesia (First ed.). Leiden and New York: Martinus Nijhoff Publishers. ISBN 0-7923-0811-5.
- Godwin, Peter; Hancock, Ian (1995) [1993]. Rhodesians Never Die: The Impact of War and Political Change on White Rhodesia c. 1970–1980. Harare: Baobab Books. ISBN 978-0-908311-82-8.
- Guttery, Ben R (1998). Encyclopedia of African Airlines. Jefferson, NC: McFarland & Company. ISBN 978-0-7864-0495-7.
- Moorcraft, Paul L; McLaughlin, Peter (2008) [1982]. The Rhodesian War: A Military History. Barnsley: Pen and Sword Books. ISBN 978-1-84415-694-8.
- Nkomo, Joshua; Harman, Nicholas (1984). Nkomo: The Story of My Life (First ed.). London: Methuen Publishing. ISBN 978-0-413-54500-8.
- Nyarota, Geoffrey (2006). Against the Grain: Memoirs of a Zimbabwean Newsman. Cape Town: Zebra. ISBN 978-1-77007-112-4.
- Palley, Claire (1966). The Constitutional History and Law of Southern Rhodesia 1888–1965, with Special Reference to Imperial Control (First ed.). Oxford: Clarendon Press. OCLC 406157.
- Petter-Bowyer, P J H (2005) [2003]. Winds of Destruction: the Autobiography of a Rhodesian Combat Pilot. Johannesburg: 30° South Publishers. ISBN 978-0-9584890-3-4.
- Scully, Pat (1984). Exit Rhodesia: From UDI to Marxism (First ed.). Ladysmith, Natal: Cotswold Press. ISBN 978-0-620-07802-3.
- Sibanda, Eliakim M (2005). The Zimbabwe African People's Union 1961–87: A Political History of Insurgency in Southern Rhodesia. Trenton, NJ: Africa Research & Publications. ISBN 978-1-59221-276-7.
- Smith, Ian (1997). The Great Betrayal: The Memoirs of Ian Douglas Smith. London: John Blake Publishing. ISBN 1-85782-176-9.
- Wessels, Hannes (2010). P K van der Byl: African Statesman. Johannesburg: 30° South Publishers. ISBN 978-1-920143-49-7.
- Williams, Gwyneth; Hackland, Brian (1988). The Dictionary of Contemporary Politics of Southern Africa (First ed.). London: Routledge. ISBN 978-0-415-00245-5.
- Wood, J R T (2008). A matter of weeks rather than months: The Impasse between Harold Wilson and Ian Smith: Sanctions, Aborted Settlements and War 1965–1969. Victoria, British Columbia: Trafford Publishing. ISBN 978-1-4251-4807-2.
