= Operation Snoopy =

1978 Rhodesian attack in the Rhodesian Bush War

- Part of Rhodesian Bush War
- Operation Snoopy (Mozambique)
Date	20 September 1978
Location	Chimoio, Mozambique
Result	Rhodesian victory

Belligerents
Rhodesia	ZANLA; FRELIMO

Commanders and leaders
(Rhodesia) Ian Smith	Robert Mugabe (Mozambique) Unknown

Units involved
Rhodesian Army: RLI; SAS; RhAF	Unknown

Strength
Unknown	ZANLA: unknown Mozambique: 9 T-54/55 tanks 4 BTR-152 APCs

Casualties and losses
2 killed	: Several hundred killed (Mozambique) : unknown 3 APCs destroyed

Operation Snoopy was an operation launched by Rhodesia in response to Air Rhodesia Flight 825 being shot down by a communist backed insurgent group, the ZIPRA. The operation took place in Mozambique, where many of the ZANLA's camps were located, particularly in the area in and around Chimoio.

== Background ==
After the Vickers Viscount passenger plane was shot down by the communist-backed insurgents, many Rhodesians clamoured for a massive retaliatory strike against terrorist targets in Zambia, where a large number of the insurgents were based. However, the first external target hit by the Rhodesian Security Forces after the Viscount shootdown was the prominent cluster of ZANLA bases around Chimoio, in Mozambique.

== Operation ==
The Rhodesians destroyed the ZANLA's camps in and around the town of Chimoio through a combination of ground operations and air strikes by the Rhodesian Air Force. In total, the security forces attacked and destroyed twenty-five insurgent camps. The camps were spread over a 33 km2 area, which was approximately 70 km from the Rhodesian border.

During the operation, Mozambique sent armoured vehicles to the ZANLA's aid in the form of nine Soviet-made T-54 tanks and four Soviet BTR-152 armoured personnel carriers. However, the Mozambicans were easily sent into a rout by the elite units of the Rhodesian Security Forces, which managed to destroy one of the Mozambicans' armoured vehicles and kill an unknown number of Mozambicans.

Hawker Hunter fighter-bombers from the RhAF destroyed another two Mozambican armoured personnel carriers. According to official Rhodesian figures, "several hundred" guerrillas killed during Operation Snoopy, and the security forces lost only two troopers. One of them was the SAS trooper Steve Donnelly, who was accidentally killed by a friendly air strike involving a Golf Bomb.

== Sources ==
- Moorcraft, Paul L; McLaughlin, Peter (April 2008) [1982]. The Rhodesian War: A Military History. Barnsley: Pen and Sword Books. ISBN 978-1-84415-694-8.
