= Vuti =

Vuti, Zimbabwe
- Interactive map of Vuti, Zimbabwe
- Coordinates: 16°29′05″S 29°28′16″E
- Country: Zimbabwe
- Province: Mashonaland West
- Elevation: 1,149 m (3,770 ft)
- Time zone: UTC+2 (CAT)
  - Summer (DST): UTC+1 (CEST)

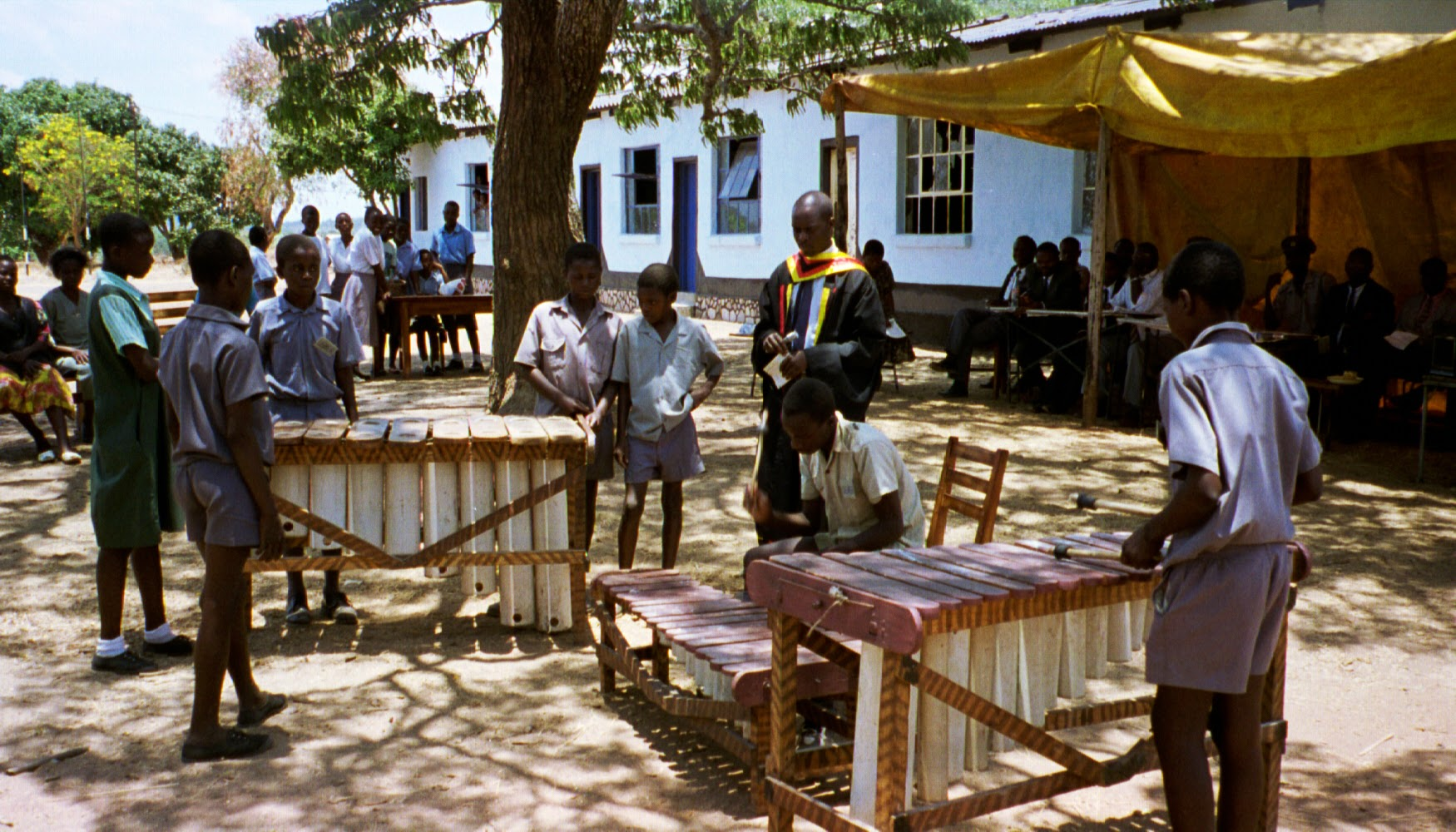
Pupils at Vuti Primary School playing marimbas

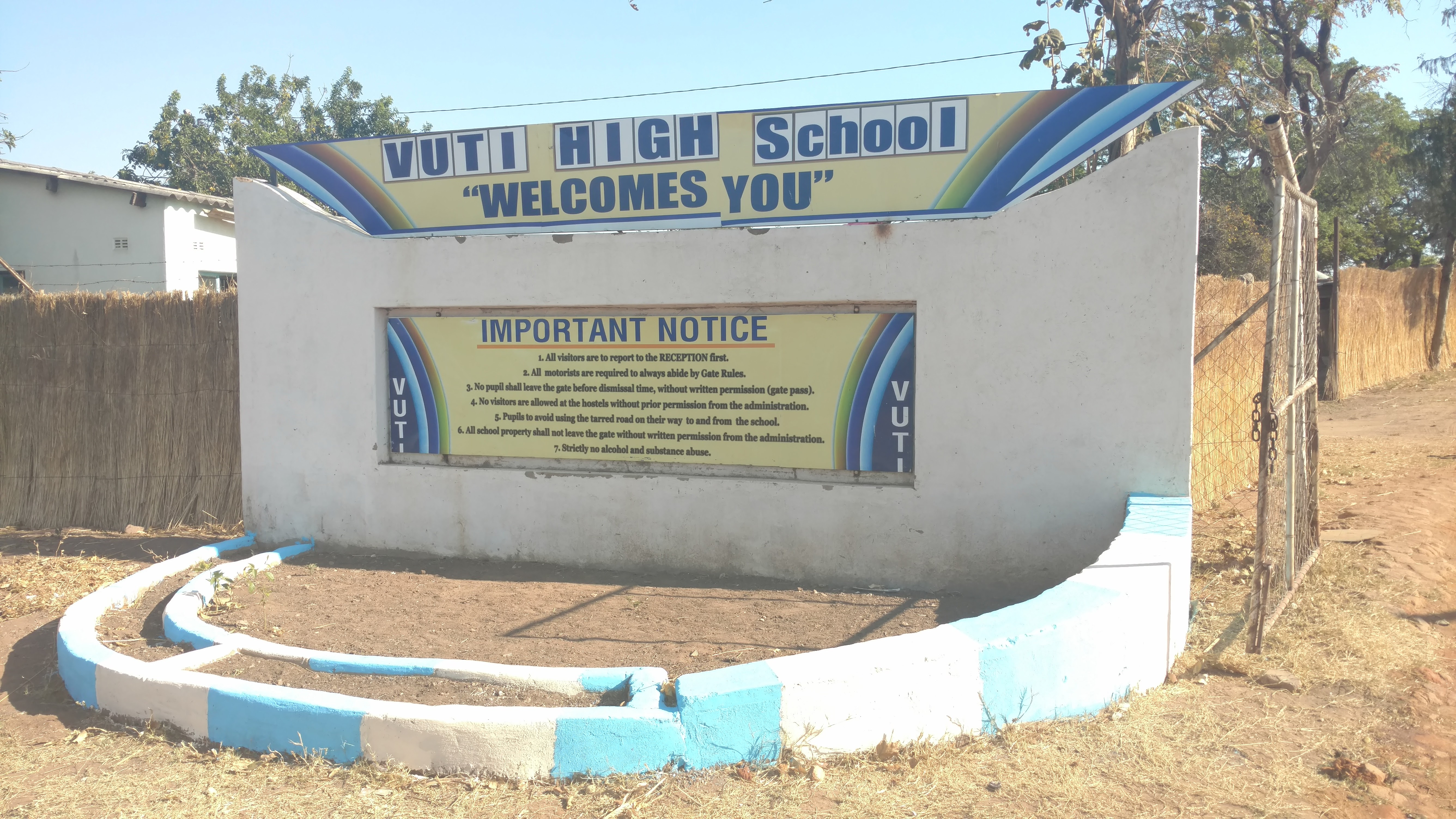
Sign at entrance of Vuti High School

Vuti is a village in the province of Mashonaland West, Zimbabwe. It is located about 60 km north-west of Karoi and 10 km east of the Charara Safari Area. Vuti is the location of Vuti Primary School, Vuti High School, a Grain Marketing Board Depot, and a few stores. The village is surrounded by small-scale farms.
