= Air Rhodesia =

Flag carrier of Rhodesia

IATA	ICAO	Call sign
RH	—	RHODESIA
- Founded: 1 September 1967
- Ceased operations: 1980
- Hubs: Salisbury
- Focus cities: Bulawayo, Kariba
- Fleet size: 13
- Destinations: Domestic, South Africa, Malawi, Mozambique
- Headquarters: Salisbury Airport; Salisbury, Rhodesia
- Key people: Mervin Eyatt, Ken Greager

Air Rhodesia was the national airline of Rhodesia. Its head office was located on the property of Salisbury Airport in Salisbury.

The airline was formed as a subsidiary of Central African Airways (CAA) in June 1964, but became an independent corporation on 1 September 1967. It flew internal routes to Buffalo Range, Bulawayo, Fort Victoria, Kariba, and Victoria Falls. During the 1970s, it operated international flights to Johannesburg and Durban in South Africa; Beira, Vilanculos and Lourenço Marques in Mozambique; and Blantyre in Malawi.

Air Rhodesia's mainstay aircraft were Vickers Viscount 700D turboprops and Boeing 720 jetliners, three of which were successfully purchased in April 1973 despite sanctions against the Rhodesian government. After the country was renamed, the airline became known as Air Zimbabwe Rhodesia in 1979, before reforming as Air Zimbabwe in 1980.

== History ==
=== Central African Airways ===
Central African Airways (CAA) was formed on 1 June 1946 as the joint airline of Southern Rhodesia (later Rhodesia; now Zimbabwe), Northern Rhodesia (now Zambia) and Nyasaland (now Malawi), the governments of the three countries owning 50%, 35% and 15% of the airline's share capital respectively. CAA began operating with a mixture of former Rhodesian Air Services (RAS) aircraft, but soon took delivery of five De Havilland Doves and three Vickers VC.1 Vikings. Services were steadily expanded to cover a route network that extended as far north as Nairobi in Kenya, and as far south as Johannesburg in South Africa, also serving destinations such as Blantyre in Malawi to the east, and Maun in Bechuanaland (now Botswana) to the west. In August 1948, CAA inaugurated Africa's first air freight service.

By 1954, CAA had expanded to cover routes as far afield as London in the UK. The federation that joined the three shareholders of CAA was dissolved in 1963, and Northern Rhodesia and Nyasaland prepared to attain their independence the following year, to become Zambia and Malawi respectively. The two new countries expressed a wish to operate their own airlines but this was not straightforward because CAA's core operations were mostly based in Southern Rhodesia, including the engineering base, stores and most of the infrastructure and personnel that were needed to support the airline; only minor repairs to the aircraft could be attempted away from the Salisbury base. A settlement was agreed in December 1963, which provided at least a temporary solution to the problem: CAA would remain in existence but it would be responsible to a higher authority consisting of transport ministers from the three separate governments. Independent subsidiaries of CAA were formed to operate in the three countries: Air Malawi Ltd, based in Blantyre; Zambia Airways Ltd, based in Lusaka; and Air Rhodesia (Pvt) Ltd, based in Salisbury. The administrative arrangements that operated between the three companies proved to be successful and profitable for all three. On 11 November 1965, the Rhodesian Government formalised the Unilateral Declaration of Independence from Britain, and sanctions were imposed on Rhodesia shortly afterwards by Britain and independent African states, including Malawi and Zambia; this closed down almost all international flights operating through Rhodesia, with the exception of Portugal's TAP Air and South African Airways. Relations between the three sister companies became strained and a split was agreed in 1967.

=== Air Rhodesia Corporation ===
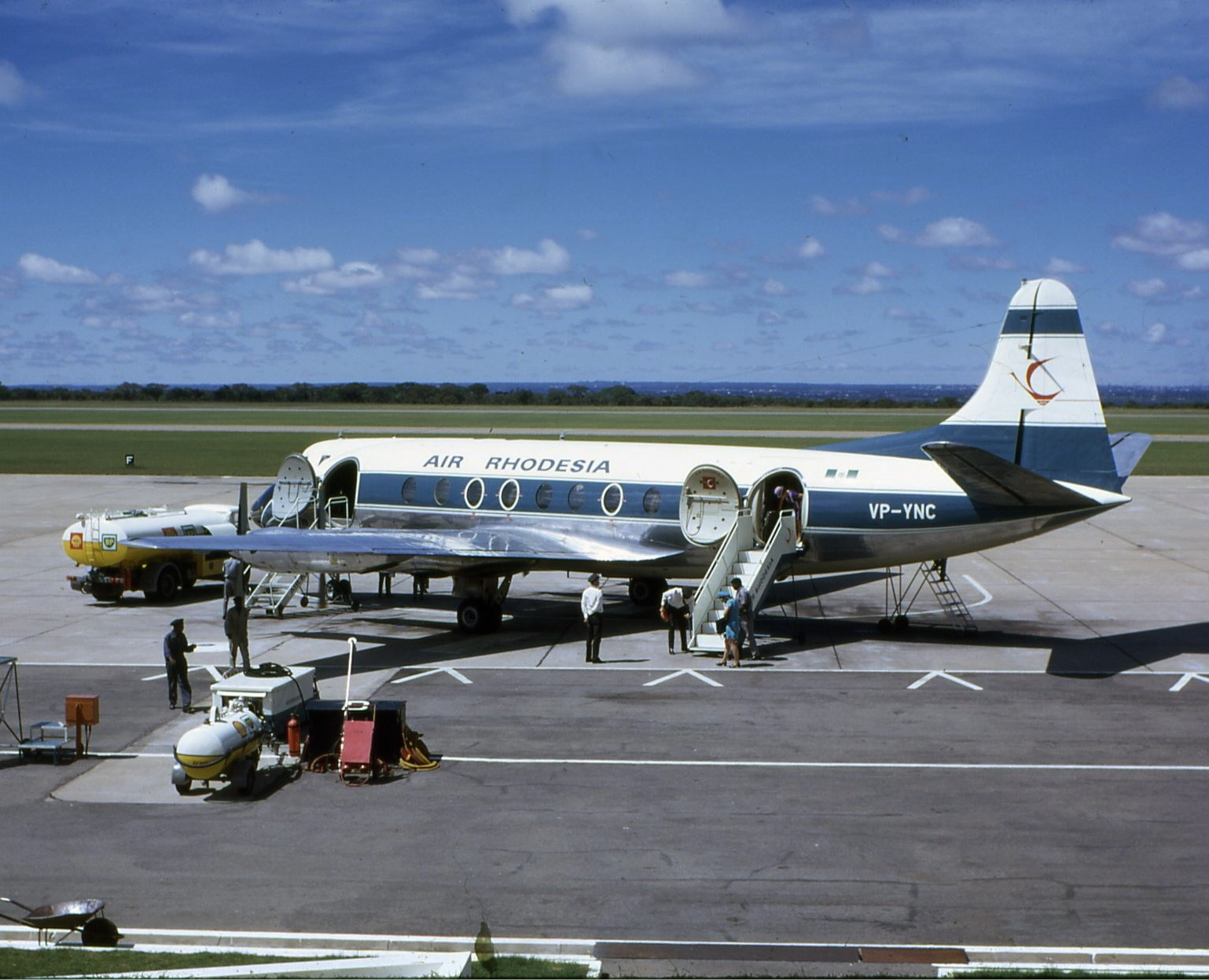
An Air Rhodesia Viscount at Bulawayo Airport in the early 1970s

Air Rhodesia Corporation came into being on 1 September 1967 while Rhodesia was under international isolation. Unlike Zambia, Malawi maintained "cool" relations with Air Rhodesia Corporation, and as a result, flights between Salisbury and Blantyre were maintained and soon increased; Air Rhodesia posted a profit in its first year of operation. The aircraft were then repainted in a livery consisting of a white top side, with dark blue and light blue "cheatlines" on the fuselage sides; sloping dark blue and light blue stripes also appeared on the vertical fin. The controversial "twiggi bird", a highly stylised representation of the Zimbabwe Bird, the national emblem of Zimbabwe (then-named Rhodesia), was superimposed on the two fin stripes. This was criticised in some circles as being scarcely recognisable as a Zimbabwe Bird, and it was even likened to an Arab dhow under sail.

=== 1973–1978 ===
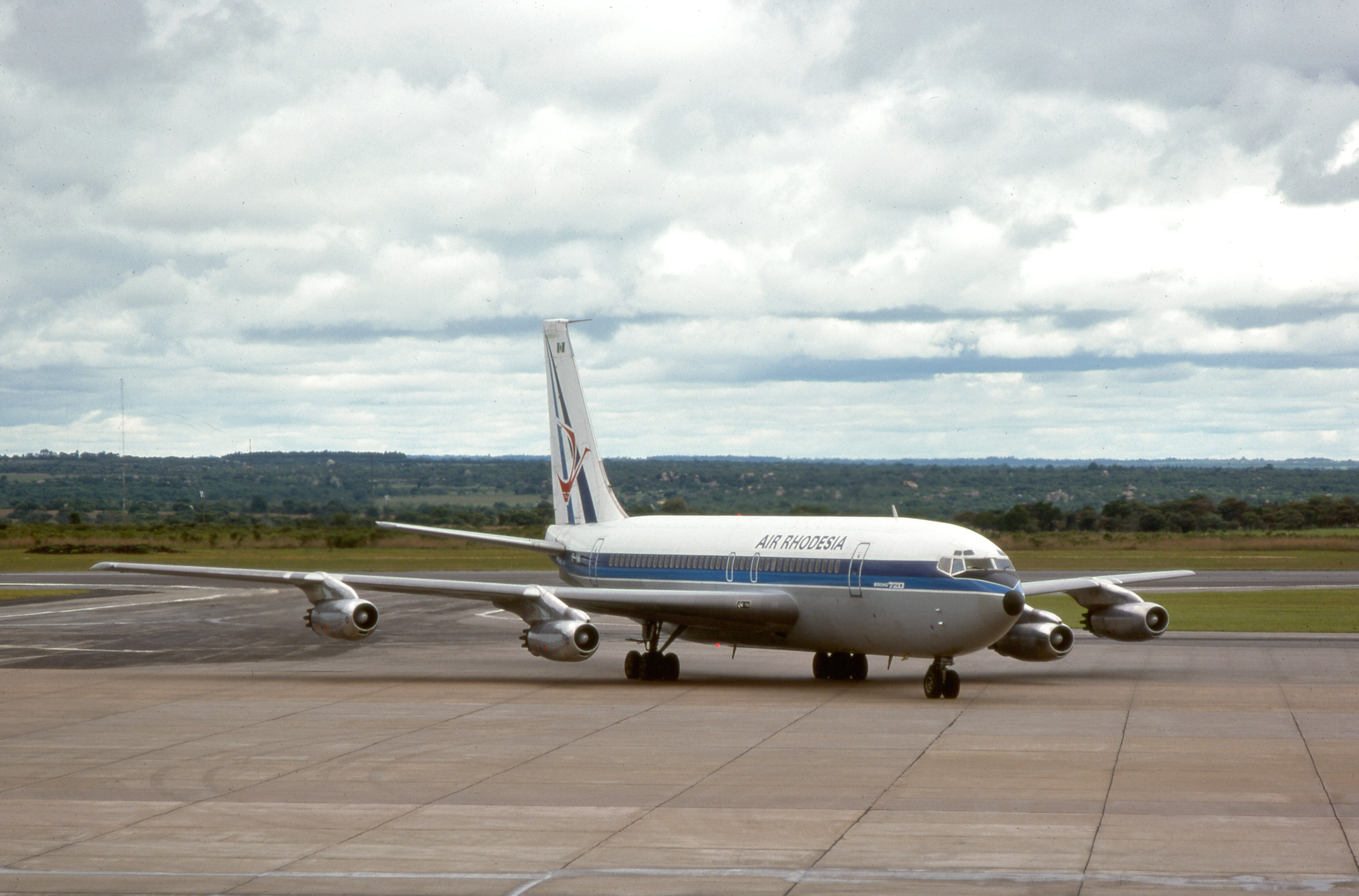
An Air Rhodesia Boeing 720 at Salisbury Airport in 1977

Air Rhodesia's profits increased between 1969 and 1970, and the airline continued to perform well despite the challenges brought about by sanctions and the deteriorating political environment within Rhodesia. Passenger services were introduced to Kariba; the Dakota services to Wankie were upgraded to use the Viscount; and additional revenue was earned by lending surplus aircrew to other airlines. However, Air Rhodesia's performance was affected when its competitors began to use new jet airliners, and it became obvious that jet aircraft were essential for international services. The airline covertly acquired its first jets, three Boeing 720-025 jetliners, which arrived under a shroud of secrecy on the evening of 14 April 1973 during the Easter holiday; they had initially been purchased new by the original Eastern Air Lines, a U.S. air carrier based in Miami, and had then been acquired by Calair, a German charter airline that folded in 1972. Air Rhodesia's new jet planes were ready to be put into service in November 1973, just as fuel prices increased by 35 percent because of the Yom Kippur War in the Middle East. Soon afterwards, the Rhodesian Bush War began to escalate sharply, and staff shortages due to military call-ups were adding to the airline's difficulties. Mozambique was granted its independence in 1975, and Air Rhodesia services to Blantyre and Beira were banned in March 1976 when Rhodesian aircraft were prohibited from overflying Mozambican territory. Until 1979, the airline's only external services would be to Johannesburg and Durban.

=== Rhodesian Bush War ===
On 3 September 1978, Air Rhodesia Flight 825, a Vickers Viscount with registration VP-WAS, was shot down near Kariba by militants belonging to the Zimbabwe People's Revolutionary Army. Only eight people survived the crash and the ensuing massacre by the guerilla fighters. Just five months later, on 12 February 1979, Air Rhodesia Flight 827, another Viscount, registered VP-YND, was shot down in the same area, killing everyone on board. As a protective measure, all of the surviving Air Rhodesia Viscounts were quickly painted in a special yellowish-green matte paint, and all shiny metal surfaces on the aircraft, including propeller blades and spinners, were painted over. In order to prevent heat-seeking missiles from locking on to the hot jet pipes, specially designed engine guards were fitted to the engine nacelles, which had the effect of significantly increasing the aircraft's fuel consumption. Meanwhile, due to the ongoing war, passenger numbers continued to plummet as fuel prices soared.

=== 1979: Air Zimbabwe Rhodesia ===
When Rhodesia achieved democracy as Zimbabwe Rhodesia, Air Rhodesia became "Air Zimbabwe Rhodesia". In anticipation of the new political truce bringing about stability and new opportunities, Air Zimbabwe Rhodesia ordered construction of a large new hangar in 1979. Thoughts immediately turned to reopening routes to destinations long closed to the airline as a result of sanctions.

=== 1980–2012: Air Zimbabwe ===
After independence in Zimbabwe, Air Zimbabwe Rhodesia was renamed "Air Zimbabwe", which went bankrupt in 2012 before being resurrected in 2013.

== Incidents and accidents ==
- Vickers Viscount, Flight RH825, 3 September 1978 – shot down by a Strela missile near Kariba Dam by Zimbabwe People's Revolutionary Army (ZIPRA). 18 of the 56 passengers survived the crash, but ten of them were killed on the ground by a group of ZIPRA revolutional parties.
- Vickers Viscount, Flight RH827, 12 February 1979 – also shot down by a Strela missile near Kariba Dam by ZIPRA armed forces; all 59 people on board died.
