= Paul Moorcraft =

British academic

Paul Leslie Moorcraft FRHistS (born 1948) is a British foreign policy analyst, academic, military historian, journalist and author. He is the director of the Centre for Foreign Policy Analysis (CFPA), an independent research organisation established in the United Kingdom in 2004, and has been a visiting professor at Cardiff University.

Moorcraft has written extensively on military history, international security, terrorism, war reporting and conflicts in Africa, the Middle East and Asia. His published work includes studies of the Russian-Ukraine conflict, southern African conflicts, Sudan, Sri Lanka, North Korea, jihadism and the Israel–Palestine conflict, as well as memoirs and fiction.

== Early life and education ==
Moorcraft was born in Cardiff, Wales, in 1948, the son of Leslie Moorcraft, an electrical engineer and Rose Gwendolyn Moorcraft, nee Dyer. He attended Canton High School in Cardiff, and then Swansea University, University of Lancaster and Cardiff University. He also studied at institutions in the Middle East and southern Africa, including the Hebrew University of Jerusalem, the University of Rhodesia and receiving a D.Litt. et Phil. from the University of South Africa.

== Academic and military career ==
Moorcraft has combined academic work with journalism and military and defence-related employment. He was a senior instructor at the Royal Military Academy Sandhurst from 1973 to 1975 and later served as a senior instructor at the Joint Services Command and Staff College from 1997 to 2000. He subsequently worked with the British Ministry of Defence and Defence Procurement Agency and has undertaken work relating to defence, crisis management and security. The Ministry of Defence recalled him for six months during the Iraq War in 2003.

Moorcraft has also taught at the University of Zimbabwe, University of KwaZulu-Natal, University of Cape Town, University of the Witwatersrand, Deakin University, University of Waikato and Bournemouth University, as well as lecturing part-time at the Open University and University of Westminster. His subjects ranged from international politics to journalism. He was appointed a Distinguished Radford Visiting Professor in Journalism at Baylor University, Texas, and a visiting professor at Cardiff University’s School of Journalism, Media and Cultural Studies.

== Journalism and war reporting ==
Moorcraft has worked as a journalist, television producer and war correspondent. His work has included reporting for Time Magazine, the BBC and television networks, and he has reported from numerous war zones in Africa, the Middle East, Asia and the Balkans, often with irregular forces, including in Afghanistan, Iraq, Palestine/Israel, Nepal, Sudan, Zimbabwe and Sri Lanka. He has written for publications such the Guardian, New Statesman, Washington Times, Canberra Times, Business Day and the Western Mail. Moorcraft is a regular commentator on security issues for BBC radio and TV in English, BBC Arabic TV and BBC Persian TV as well as for Sky Arabia TV.

He was also the editor of a range of security and foreign policy magazines, including Defence Review and Defence International. His experiences as a war correspondent became the subject of several books, including What the Hell Am I Doing Here? (1995), Guns and Poses: Travels with an Occasional War Correspondent (2001), Inside the Danger Zones: Travels to Arresting Places (2010), and Deadlines on the Front Line: Travels with a Veteran War Correspondent (2018).

== Centre for Foreign Policy Analysis ==
Moorcraft has been director of the Centre for Foreign Policy Analysis since its establishment in 2004. The organisation describes itself as independent and non-partisan and undertakes research and analysis on foreign policy, international and national security, conflict resolution, terrorism, political Islamism, asymmetrical warfare and international justice.

The CFPA has undertaken work relating to conflicts and political developments in countries including Sudan, Sri Lanka, Nepal, the Maldives and Zimbabwe.

Moorcraft has also worked as a crisis management consultant to such international blue-chip companies as Shell Oil, British Gas, 3M Corporation, Standard Bank etc., as well as for various government organisations.

== Personal Life ==
Moorcraft married Susan van den Brink in 1987 on an island situated in Zimbabwe's Lake Kariba. In his memoirs, he said it happened "almost by accident". The marriage was dissolved in 1993. Moorcraft now lives in Penarth, Wales.

He lost some eyesight in one eye as a result of previous war injuries, and in 2009 lost the sight in his good eye after surgery to remove a brain tumour. He is an active member of the Great Western Railway Accessibility Panel to assist disabled passengers.

Moorcraft takes an active interest in raising awareness of dyscalculia in children.

In April 2008, Moorcraft's views on church law and marriage, more specifically criticising the phenomenon of "wedding tourism", which involves couples seeking to be married in pretty rural parish churches with which they have no real connection, were heavily publicized in print, radio and TV in the UK.

== Writing ==
Moorcraft's writing has concentrated particularly on military history and contemporary conflicts. His early publications dealt heavily with southern Africa and the Rhodesian conflict. His recent work has covered international security issues such as Russia-Ukraine war, the Israel–Palestine conflict, the threats to international security posed by rogue states, North Korea’s confrontation with the West, international terrorism, war reporting, Sudan and Sri Lanka. His work on Sudan includes Omar al-Bashir and Africa's Longest War (2015), which combines biography and military history and includes interviews with Omar al-Bashir and people close to him.The book was reviewed in African Affairs in 2016; reviewer W. J. Berridge described its structure as combining biography, military history and political analysis, while criticising aspects of its historical treatment.

His study of the Sri Lankan conflict, Total Destruction of the Tamil Tigers: The Rare Victory of Sri Lanka's Long War (2013), examines the military defeat of the Liberation Tigers of Tamil Eelam in 2009 and the wider history of the Sri Lankan civil war. His 2018 book Total Onslaught: War and Revolution in Southern Africa Since 1945 surveys conflicts and political change across southern Africa from the end of the Second World War onwards. The book was reviewed in International Affairs in 2020.

Moorcraft's books have received both favourable and critical reviews. His novel Anchoress of Shere (Poisoned Pen Press, 2002) was a runner-up for the 2003 Benjamin Franklin Awards and the Foreword Magazine Book of the Year, and was named a "2002 notable mystery of the year" by Publishers Weekly. The Jihadist Threat: The Re-conquest of Europe? was shortlisted for the British Army Military Book of the Year 2016.

Based on his 2023 book, Churchill’s German Special Forces, he co-produced a recent BBC radio documentary on Churchill’s German SF (January 2025) and contributed to an award-winning three-part ZDF TV series on the secret X-Troop (January-February 2025).

International security and terrorism

- The Dictators' Club: The Quest for World Domination — 2026 publication by Pen & Sword.
- Putin's Wars and NATO's Flaws: Why Russia Invaded Ukraine (2023), Pen & Sword.
- North Korea: Warring with the World (2020), Pen & Sword Military.
- Superpowers, Rogue States and Terrorism: Countering the Security Threats to the West (2017), Pen & Sword Military.
- Axis of Evil: The War on Terror (2005), with John Chisholm and Gwyn Winfield; Moorcraft is credited as an editor/co-author in bibliographical records.
- The New Wars of the West: Anglo-American Voices on the War on Terror (2006), an updated version of Axis of Evil.
- The Jihadist Threat: The Re-conquest of the West? (2015), Pen & Sword Military.

Israel and Palestine

- Israel's Forever War: Israel, Palestine and the Last Hopes for Peace (2024)

Sudan and Africa

- Omar Al-Bashir and Africa's Longest War (2015), Pen & Sword Military.

Sri Lanka

- Total Destruction of the Tamil Tigers: The Rare Victory of Sri Lanka's Long War (2013), Pen & Sword Military.

Southern Africa and Rhodesia

- A Short Thousand Years: The End of Rhodesia's Rebellion (1979; revised edition 1980).
- Contact II: Struggle for Peace (1981), Sygma Books.
- Africa's Super Power (1981), Sygma Books/Collins Vaal.
- Chimurenga!: The War in Rhodesia, 1965–1980: A Military History (1982), with Peter McLaughlin.
- Stander: Bank Robber (1984), with Mike Cohen.
- African Nemesis: War and Revolution in Southern Africa, 1945–2010 (1990), Brassey's.
- The Rhodesian War: A Military History, with Peter McLaughlin (first published 1982; later editions including Stackpole Books and Pen & Sword editions).
- Mugabe's War Machine, (2011), Pen & Sword.
- Total Onslaught: War and Revolution in Southern Africa Since 1945 (2018), Pen & Sword.

War reporting and memoirs

- What the Hell Am I Doing Here? Travels with an Occasional War Correspondent (1995), Brassey's.
- Guns and Poses: Travels with an Occasional War Correspondent (2001), Millstream Press.
- Inside the Danger Zones: Travels to Arresting Places (2010), Biteback
- Deadlines on the Front Line: Travels with a Veteran War Correspondent (2018), Pen & Sword Military.
- Dying for the Truth: The Concise History of Frontline War Reporting (2016), Pen & Sword Military.
- Shooting the Messenger: The Political Impact of War Reporting, with Philip M. Taylor (2008), Biteback.

Military history

- Churchill's German Special Forces: The Elite Refugee Troops Who Took the War to Hitler (2023), Pen & Sword.

Other non-fiction

- It Just Doesn't Add Up: Explaining Dyscalculia and Overcoming Number Problems for Children and Adults (2014/2015).

Fiction

- Anchoress of Shere (2002), a historical mystery novel published by Poisoned Pen Press.{
- Regression: The Strange Journey of Thomas J. Martin (2012), Milstream.

== Reception and Criticism ==
His work on war reporting has been discussed in academic journalism literature, while his books on African conflicts have been reviewed in specialist historical and international-relations journals. Total Destruction of the Tamil Tigers, for example, was reviewed by the Australian Army Research Centre, which described it as a detailed account of a conflict that had received relatively limited attention in the West. Moorcraft's treatment of southern African conflicts has also been the subject of academic review. A 2020 review of Total Onslaught in International Affairs described his knowledge of southern Africa as substantial while placing the book within the wider historiography of conflict, colonial rule and apartheid.

Moorcraft conducted one of the first major interviews with Robert Mugabe at the end of the Rhodesia War. Although initially praising the latter for a conciliatory attitude towards white Rhodesians in the new Zimbabwe, he would later become a harsh critic of the Mugabe regime.

Moorcraft also supported the war against Saddam Hussein in 2003, but later recanted his views in the light of the failure to find weapons of mass destruction. In 2006, he supported a total withdrawal of Western forces from Muslim countries, according to Sunday Express.
