= Andrew Rawlins =

Rhodesian Army officer (1925–1984)

Major-General Andrew Rawlins OLM ESM
- Rawlins in South Africa in 1977
- Born: 1925
- Died: 1984 (aged 59); South Africa
- Military career
- Allegiance: Rhodesia and Nyasaland, Rhodesia
- Branch: Rhodesian Army and Guard Force
- Service years: pre-1960 to 1979
- Rank: Major-general
- Unit: Rhodesian African Rifles
- Conflicts: Rhodesian Bush War

Major-General George Andrew Dendy Rawlins (1925–1984) was a Rhodesian Army officer. He served in the Rhodesian African Rifles during the pre-independence years when Rhodesia was part of the British Federation of Rhodesia and Nyasaland. He remained in the unit following Rhodesia's unilateral declaration of independence in 1965. He was a proponent of psychological warfare in the early years of the Rhodesian Bush War but his proposals were not acted upon. In 1967 he recommended other changes in tactics to the Rhodesian chief of staff, Brigadier Keith Coster. Rawlins retired from the army as a brigadier in 1976 but was brought back to command, as a major general, the newly formed Guard Force. This unit was established to defend the protected villages, where the Rhodesian government had moved black civilians to isolate them from the guerrillas. He left this role in February 1977 to become the Rhodesian Army's director of psychological warfare. Rawlins left the army in 1979 as the Rhodesian Bush War was drawing to a close and ahead of the territory's transition into Zimbabwe.

== Early career ==
Rawlins served with the British Army during the Malaya Emergency (1948–1960). By 1960 he held the rank of major and was second-in-command of the Rhodesian African Rifles (RAR). His commander had wanted the unit to wear ostrich feathers in their bush hats (which had previously been plain) but this had been vetoed by the British Army as they were worn by the 1st (Nyasaland) battalion of the King's African Rifles. Rawlins instead proposed that a hackle of black ox-hair be worn, as the same material had been worn by members of the Matabele chief Lobengula's Mbizo regiment in the 19th century. The site of the Mbizo kraal (headquarters) was close to the RAR's Methuen barracks. Rawlins' suggestion was adopted.

== Rhodesian Bush War ==
Rhodesia unilaterally declared independence from Britain in 1965, as a white-minority governed state. It was opposed by the Zimbabwe African National Union (ZANU) and Zimbabwe African People's Union (ZAPU) who wanted black majority rule. By 1966 Rawlins was a lieutenant colonel and a staff officer at Rhodesian army headquarters. He recognised the value of psychological warfare in the fight against ZAPU and ZANU and wrote a memorandum on the matter, but no serious psychological campaigns were mounted by the Rhodesian Army until 1978 by which time it proved too late to affect the course of the Rhodesian Bush War. Rawlins had proposed the army use counter-intimidation tactics and traditional witchcraft to influence the opinion of the black population. Because of a lack of expertise on local practices in the army and British South African Police he proposed that psychological warfare units be established to be assigned to individual operations. These would have consisted of retired Ministry of Internal Affairs district commissioners and witch doctors who had a knowledge of the rural peoples. Failure to act on Rawlins' proposal led to the loss of advantage to the guerrillas who employed their own witch doctors.

By March 1967 Rawlins was a military liaison officer to the diplomatic mission in Pretoria, South Africa. In a memorandum addressed to the Rhodesian Army's chief of staff, Brigadier Keith Coster, he recommended swift and offensive action against the guerrillas to prevent them building up strength and proposed the improvement of intelligence, communications and logistics arrangements. He also advocated that the army be equipped with the best possible equipment and receive realistic training. Rawlins wanted to avoid the army being hemmed into defensive positions as the French had been during their defeat in the First Indochina War and the Portuguese were then experiencing during the Angolan War of Independence. Following experience in August–September 1967's Operation Nickel Rawlins ordered the School of Infantry to research how tracking skills could be taught to the army. This eventually led to the establishment of a combat tracking school by the Rhodesian SAS.

Rawlins was promoted to the acting rank of brigadier on 14 December 1970 to command 1st Brigade; the following year he was awarded the Exemplary Service Medal for 27 years service. On 11 November 1973, by which point he had been promoted to the rank of major-general, he was appointed an officer of the Legion of Merit. By February 1974 Rawlins was serving as the Rhodesian Army's chief of staff. He retired in 1976 but was brought back to become the first commander of the newly established Guard Force. This was a mixed-race unit formed to defend the protected villages established by the Ministry of Internal Affairs to separate the rural population from the ZAPU and ZANU guerrillas. Rawlins was replaced as commander of the Guard Force in February 1977 by Brigadier Bill Godwin. Rawlins became the Rhodesian Army's director of psychological warfare, remaining in post until 1979. He died in South Africa in 1984, at the age of 59.
