= Police Anti-Terrorist Unit =

Paramilitary arm of Rhodesian police force

- The patch of the Police Anti-Terrorist Unit.
- Active: 1966 - 1980
- Country: Rhodesia
- Agency: British South Africa Police
- Type: Paramilitary
- Role: Counterterrorism; Counterinsurgency
- Part of: British South Africa Police (BSAP)
- Abbreviation: PATU

Structure
- Subunits: Sticks; Support Units; Tracking and Observation Units; Canine Units; Intelligence Units

Notables
- Significant operation(s): Rhodesian Bush War; Battle of Sinoia

The Police Anti-Terrorist Unit (PATU) was a paramilitary auxiliary arm of the British South Africa Police (BSAP) in Rhodesia. The unit was founded in 1966. The concept was created for guerrilla bush warfare and the personnel were both black and white policemen. The unit was abolished in 1980 following the dissolution of the BSAP.

== History ==
Until 1953, the BSAP was the only armed uniformed force permanently raised in Southern Rhodesia. PATU was formed in 1966 by the BSAP Chief Superintendent Bill Bailey who had served in the SAS during the Second World War. Bailey had observed tactics of the Long Range Desert Group and believed that smaller specialist units that could be deployed faster were more advanced ways to win wars. Following the start of the Rhodesian Bush War, Bailey was given permission by the BSAP to set the unit up. The first volunteers were mostly older police reserves who had training in tracking and bush craft but this later extended to regular policemen who had tracking skills. Though PATU was not designed as a military unit, they eventually ended up taking on the role of a reconnaissance unit for the Rhodesian Security Forces. They played a key role in the Battle of Sinoia in 1968 where they killed seven ZANLA guerrillas with air support from the Royal Rhodesian Air Force.

Their tactics involved them being deployed in groups of five known as "sticks". The group would always be led by a black policeman from a tribe who had tracking and hunting skills and would act as interpreter. The remaining four would tend to be made up of four white policemen, though some did have tracking experience. This ratio would be common and there was only one all-black stick. Initially they patrolled in police uniform but after Operation Cauldron, where there was hesitancy from a Rhodesian Light Infantry commando on firing at an enemy because they wore the same colour trousers as the BSAP's riot uniforms, PATU were issued camouflage uniforms.

The plan for the unit was that they would be able to stay in the field for long periods of time after rapid deployment. However, due to lack of suitable volunteers in rural areas, a lot of the white policemen joining PATU sticks were white immigrants to Rhodesia who had lived in urban areas and had no experience of the bush. Sometimes their numbers were made up by policemen seconded from the South African Police, a decision not popular with local Rhodesians due to the South Africans' tendency to make pro-apartheid comments whilst on patrol. Eventually a majority of those in the police would have taken part in PATU, though later younger policemen were moved to the Police Support Unit. The unit was abolished in 1980 when the BSAP was disbanded.
