= Bill Godwin =

Rhodesian army officer (1922–2018)

Brigadier Bill Godwin OBE OLM DMM
- Godwin at the last commanding officers' parade of the Guard Force, April 1980
- Born: 1922; British India
- Died: 2018 (aged 95–96); South Africa
- Military career
- Allegiance: British Empire (1940–1965); Rhodesia (1965–1980)
- Branch: British Indian Army (1940–1947); Rhodesian Army & Guard Force (1947–1980)
- Service years: 1940–1980
- Rank: Brigadier
- Commands: 1st Battation, Rhodesian African Rifles; 3rd Battalion, Rhodesia Regiment; Guard Force
- Conflicts: Second World War; Malayan Emergency; Rhodesian Bush War

Brigadier William Arthur Godwin (1922–2018) was a Rhodesian army officer. He served with the Rhodesian African Rifles (RAR) during the British colonial era and was mentioned in despatches for service during the Malayan Emergency. After Rhodesia's 1965 unilateral declaration of independence from Britain Godwin remained with the RAR, rising to command its 1st battalion. By 1972 Godwin had reached the rank of brigadier and commanded Rhodesia's 2nd Brigade. He had retired by 1975, but was brought back to help establish the Guard Force, a new armed service that provided security to the protected villages. The unit disbanded after the 1980 transition to black-majority government (as Zimbabwe).

== Early life and career ==
Godwin was born in British India in 1922. He joined the British Indian Army in 1940, and reached the rank of sergeant by 10 December 1942 when he was granted an emergency commission as a second lieutenant. He transferred to the Southern Rhodesia Staff Corps in June 1947. Godwin served in the Rhodesian African Rifles (RAR) and was deployed to Malaya during the Emergency and was mentioned in despatches for his service as a temporary major in late 1957. Godwin later thought his enlisted men, who were black, performed well in Malaya. He noted "they would see things to which we Europeans were simply not attuned. Most of them were reasonably good trackers and some were brilliant". He later rose to command the regiment's 1st battalion. In May 1963 he transferred from the RAR to command the 3rd (Northern Rhodesia) Battalion of the Royal Rhodesia Regiment. Godwin's battalion was transferred to the control of Northern Rhodesia in December 1963 upon the breaking up of the Federation of Rhodesia and Nyasaland. The state took the name Zambia when it achieved independence in 1964 and the 3rd battalion became the 6th battalion of the Zambia Rifles; by this time Godwin has relinquished his command. In the 1965 Birthday Honours Godwin was appointed an Officer of the Order of the British Empire.

Godwin remained in the white-minority ruled Rhodesia (former Southern Rhodesia) following its 1965 unilateral declaration of independence from Britain. He participated in the Rhodesian Bush War against guerrillas fighting for black-majority rule. Godwin reformed the RAR following criticism of its performance, when compared to the recently formed Rhodesian Light Infantry, between Operation Nickel and Operation Cauldron (August 1967-May 1968). Godwin focussed on improving the leadership abilities of his junior officers and providing training in tracking skills. Some of these techniques were those he had learnt in Malaya (though the RAR had been criticised during Operation Nickel for its Malaya mindset). Godwin's twin brother, Major Walter Godwin, had also served during Operation Nickel, in command of 1 Independent Company of the Royal Rhodesia Regiment. In 1971 Godwin was awarded the Defence Forces' Medal for Meritorious Service.

== Brigadier ==
By 1972 Godwin was a brigadier and in command of the army's 2nd Brigade. In 1975, he was brought out of retirement to help form Guard Force, an armed service similar to, but separate from, the Rhodesian Army that served to guard the Ministry of Internal Affairs' protected villages. The Guard Force was initially commanded by Major General Andrew Rawlins but Godwin assumed command in February 1977 when Rawlins was appointed the army's director of psychological warfare. In this role Godwin was appointed an officer of the Legion of Merit.

The Bush War ended and Rhodesia transitioned to a black majority government in April 1980, as Zimbabwe. By May 1980, the Guard Force was being disbanded. Godwin presided over the unit's last parade at which he told his men to quietly fade away. Godwin retired soon afterwards. He later reflected on the black members of the Rhodesian Army saying "every soldier in the army was a volunteer and it had always been so. This could hardly be said of those who followed Mugabe and Nkomo ... Throughout this Rhodesia stood alone, and our masodjas [African soldiers] stayed with us to the bitter end". In retirement, Godwin gave lectures in Cape Town to the South African Military History Society; he died in 2018.
