= History of the Rhodesian Light Infantry (1961–1972) =

Early history of the Rhodesian Light Infantry

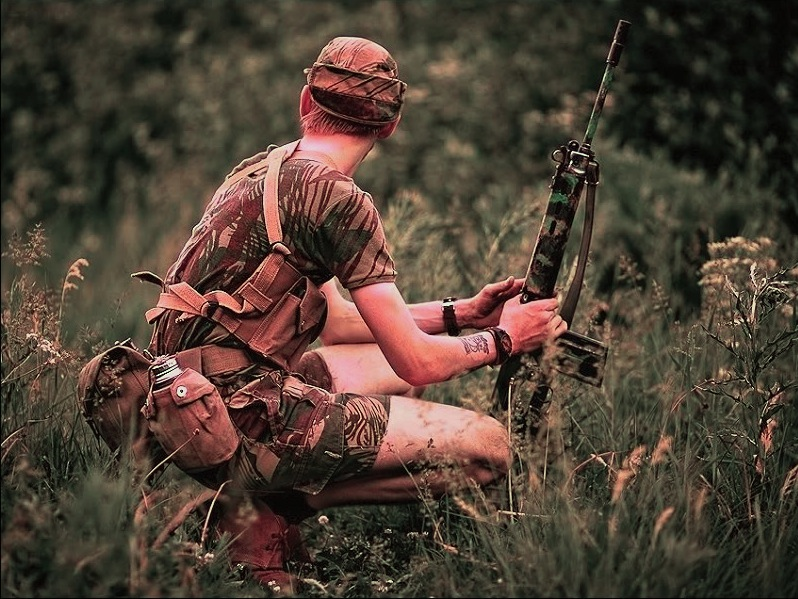
A modern re-enactor simulates a Rhodesian Light Infantry trooper from the mid-1970s. RLI soldiers favoured practicality while on operations and typically wore a lightweight T-shirt and shorts. From 1977 the wearing of regulation camouflage, including long-sleeved shirts and trousers, was strictly enforced because of the easy visibility of exposed white skin.

The 1st Battalion, The Rhodesian Light Infantry, commonly the Rhodesian Light Infantry (1RLI or RLI), was originally formed in 1961 as a regiment of the army of the Federation of Rhodesia and Nyasaland. Raised as a light infantry unit at Brady Barracks, Bulawayo in Southern Rhodesia, the Regiment served in the Rhodesian Bush War as part of the Rhodesian Security Forces between 1964 and 1979, from 1965 under the unrecognised governments of Rhodesia and latterly, during the second half of 1979, Zimbabwe Rhodesia. The RLI remained active during an interim period under British control and then, from April 1980, within the armed forces of Zimbabwe, before disbanding on 31 October 1980.

The RLI was formed in February 1961 as a light infantry battalion made up exclusively of white recruits. After first seeing action in September 1961 on the Northern Rhodesian border with Katanga, it relocated to Cranborne Barracks, Salisbury the following year and remained there as part of the Southern Rhodesian Army after the Federation dissolved on 31 December 1963. Violent political intimidation of black Rhodesians by two rival communist-backed revolutionary parties, the Zimbabwe African People's Union (ZAPU) and Zimbabwe African National Union (ZANU), necessitated a specially trained counter-insurgency unit, and the RLI was accordingly reformed into a commando regiment during 1964 and 1965 under the command of Lieutenant-Colonel Peter Walls.

Following Rhodesia's Unilateral Declaration of Independence from Britain on 11 November 1965, the RLI became widely known for its counter-insurgency operations during the Rhodesian Bush War against incursions by ZAPU and ZANU's respective military wings, the Zimbabwe People's Revolutionary Army (ZIPRA) and Zimbabwe African National Liberation Army (ZANLA). The regiment acquitted itself well in several such operations, with some of its soldiers winning decorations for their actions. Some operations, such as Operations Flotilla and Excess in 1968, involved cooperation with the Portuguese Armed Forces in Mozambique.

The nationalist incursions became fewer and further between after the two guerrilla armies suffered repeated setbacks against the security forces during the late 1960s, with many attacks being countered by the RLI. The capture by the RLI of Phinias Majuru, the ZIPRA Director of Operations, in January 1970 caused a cessation for six years of major operations by ZIPRA, which had been the more active guerrilla army up to that point. The Rhodesian Light Infantry's performance during this early period of the Bush War is generally considered to have been of a very high standard, with historian Alexandre Binda pointing to Operation Cauldron (1968) in particular as having contributed to the battalion's formidable "fighting character" and reputation as "outstanding and peerless anti-terrorist fighters". This opinion was shared by Platoon Warrant Officer Herod of the Rhodesian African Rifles, who was wounded during this operation while fighting alongside the RLI on 18 March 1968. "We of the RAR used to laugh at your soldiers," he said in hospital to a visiting RLI officer; "To us they looked like boys. But they showed us how to fight. They have the faces of boys, but they fight like lions."

== Within the Federal Army ==
=== Origin and formation in Bulawayo ===
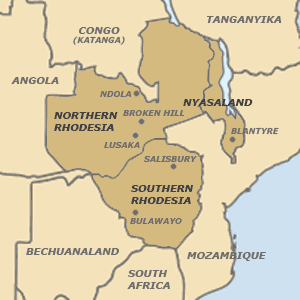
The Federation of Rhodesia and Nyasaland. The Southern Rhodesian capital of Salisbury doubled as Federal capital.

The Rhodesian Light Infantry was formed within the army of the Federation of Rhodesia and Nyasaland at Brady Barracks, Bulawayo, on 1 February 1961, composed of white recruits only. The battalion's nucleus was drawn from the short-lived Number One Training Unit, which had been raised to provide personnel for a white infantry battalion as well as for C Squadron (Rhodesian) SAS, and the Selous Scouts, a Federal Armoured Car Corps. (Note: Not to be confused with the Selous Scouts special forces regiment, which was founded in 1973 and headed by Major Ron Reid-Daly.) The majority of the first RLI recruits were from South Africa, with the rest predominantly from Southern Rhodesia and Britain: "We were a varied, rough and colourful bunch of skates," remembered Paul Wellburn, a member of the first intake, from Bulawayo. Instructors were seconded from the British Army to train the new regiment, with many coming from the Coldstream Guards and the Royal Highland Fusiliers. Split into four companies, A, B, C and D, the regiment suffered during its first few months from chronic desertions. The number of soldiers absent without leave reached a peak in April 1961, when 29 men deserted to fight as mercenaries for Moise Tshombe's secessionist State of Katanga, enticed by the hefty financial incentives offered by Katangese agents based at a Bulawayo hotel.

Despite the desertion problem, the battalion's strict discipline and drilling began to bring the men into line. "The awakening of a sense of pride in their training and confidence in themselves was becoming apparent," Alexandre Binda writes. Around this time the regimental march was chosen, as Binda says, "rather by accident than design". One of the instructors seconded from Britain, Scottish Lance-Corporal Mac Martin, developed a habit of accompanying the men's route marching with appropriate songs, played on his bagpipes. An American gospel song, When the Saints Go Marching In, became a favourite among the soldiers, and when it was omitted during a retreat ceremony in Bulawayo soon after the battalion's formation, a representative of the men complained to the Regimental Sergeant Major Ron Reid-Daly, asking why "our regimental march" was not played. Reid-Daly replied simply that there was no regimental march, prompting the representative to declare the song as such to him. Angered not only by his charges' impudence in choosing a march for themselves, but also because he believed that their preferred tune was "unimaginative", Reid-Daly consulted the Regiment's commanding officer, Lieutenant-Colonel J. S. Salt. To Reid-Daly's surprise, Salt sanctioned the troopers' choice, saying "I rather like The Saints." Soon afterwards, the lieutenant-Colonel arranged for his battalion to be presented with a pair of a cheetah cubs as regimental mascots. (Note: This original pair of cheetah mascots died on 6 October 1963, as did several sets of replacements over the years. New cheetahs were generally introduced some time after the deaths of their predecessors, but even during these intervals the unit's roll would specify the animal as its official mascot. In February 1975, a nine-month-old cheetah cub was donated to the regiment by the Department of National Parks and Wildlife Management; this cheetah became "Trooper Saint", the RLI's permanent mascot.)

=== Move to Cranborne Barracks ===
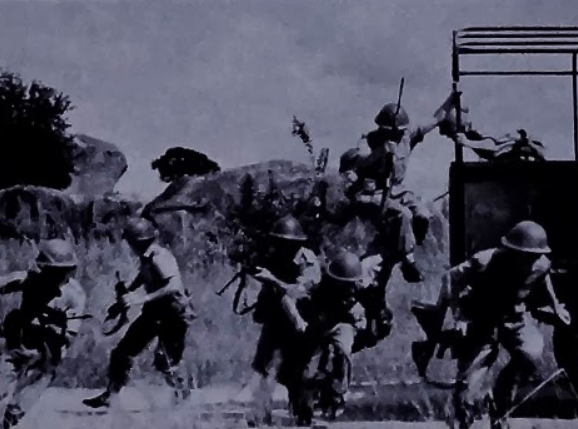
RLI troops engaged in "classical" warfare training, 1960s

The battalion's first operational duty was to relieve the Rhodesian African Rifles (RAR), which was maintaining a cordon around the town of Gwanda, 130 kilometres (81 mi) south of Bulawayo, during a local outbreak of foot-and-mouth disease. A small detachment of 14 men, led by Second Lieutenant Brian Barrett-Hamilton, was then stationed on attachment to the British Army in Bahrain in June 1961, and remained there for two months. The Congo Crisis led to the battalion's first full mobilisation on 9 September 1961, when it was detailed to man the border between Northern Rhodesia and Katanga. The companies were deployed separately in the border towns of Chingola, Kitwe, Bancroft and Mufulira, and proceeded to run checkpoints and assist refugees who crossed the border. While there were many coming over from Katanga during that time, the garrison at Chingola was surprised to meet Tshombe himself on 13 September as he fled into Northern Rhodesia.

When the Regiment returned to Bulawayo, it found that Brady Barracks had been ransacked, with over four-fifths of the men losing all of their civilian clothes and personal belongings. (Note: The perpetrators of this break-in and theft were never discovered. Some motor vehicles parked outside the barracks had also been stolen in the Regiment's absence.) The RLI was due to transfer to Salisbury in any case, with a state-of-the art headquarters at Cranborne Barracks already under construction, but in light of the burglary it relocated first to Inkomo Garrison, about 50 kilometres (31 mi) away from the capital. The battalion settled at Cranborne in April 1962, and at the same time received approval from the British College of Arms for its regimental badge. The RLI's ceremonial dress was also adopted at this time: tartan green was chosen with peaked caps. A riot at Kariba occasioned the RLI's deployment to resolve the violence, but on arrival the troops found that they had little to do, their mere presence having restored order. They instead found work assisting in Operation Noah, an animal-rescue exercise made necessary by the construction of the Kariba Dam on the Zambezi and resultant rising of the waters into what became Lake Kariba.

The College of Arms produced two colours for the RLI, with Queen Elizabeth II giving final approval to a Queen's colour and a regimental colour on 15 July 1963. The first of these was a standard Union Flag design; the unit's name was marked on a circle, which was placed centrally and surmounted by a crown. The second was based on a dark green background and featured the regimental badge in its centre, surrounded by a wreath of flame lilies, Rhodesia's national flower, (Note: Where a wreath is included on the colour of a regiment serving the British monarch, it is almost always made up of roses and thistles, two typically British flowers. The RLI's substitution of the Rhodesian flame lily is the only exception.) and topped, as with the Queen's colour, with the royal crown. The battalion took part in Operation Zephyr during the second half of 1963, a counter-intimidation action against political agitators from the Zimbabwe African National Union (ZANU) and Zimbabwe African People's Union (ZAPU). As with the previous posting to Kariba, little to no action was necessary; it was enough of a deterrent that troops were present. When the Federation broke up on the last day of 1963, members of the Federal Army could transfer to the Southern Rhodesian Army, request a posting to Northern Rhodesia, or leave the military altogether, receiving a monetary "golden handshake" if they chose the last option. So many servicemen chose to take the money and leave that "only a handful", according to paymaster Lieutenant Paddy Leen, remained in the mess on 31 December 1963. Leen had paid off over 200 RLI men since the start of work on 30 December.

== Reforming the RLI; the introduction of Walls and the road to UDI ==
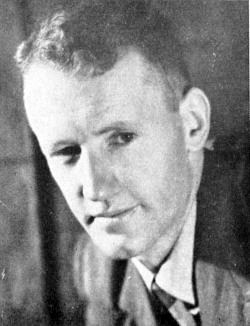
Prime Minister Ian Smith took a firm stance against violent black nationalism, and challenged the British government on the issue of independence.

The commanding officer, Lieutenant-Colonel R. A. Edwards, convened a meeting of the regiment during the first week of 1964, and gauged the extent of the decimation; about 150 officers, non-commissioned officers (NCOs) and men remained. While Edwards was rebuilding the RLI from this base, Winston Field, the Prime Minister, stepped down, and was replaced on 13 April 1964 by the deputy prime minister, Ian Smith, a firm advocate of independence from Britain under the existing 1961 constitution. Although the country was still led by the same party—the Rhodesian Front (RF)—Smith took a harder line than Field on the issue of independence. Britain insisted on an immediate shift to majority rule before independence but Smith firmly refused to yield on this constitutional question, saying that an instant transfer to black rule would cause "the destruction of our country".

ZAPU members attempted to bomb or burn down the houses of blacks who joined or supported white-led political parties, as well as the churches they attended. Rival nationalists also used violence against each other as they jostled for prominence. In an attempt to restore confidence in the government and end the political intimidation, Smith cracked down hard on the militant nationalists, arresting political agitators in the townships for criminal offences and jailing ZAPU leader Joshua Nkomo in Gonakudzingwa Restriction Camp, a remote detention unit in the country's south-east. The British government, worried that Southern Rhodesia might issue a unilateral declaration of independence (UDI) rather than continue with negotiations, placed troops in Aden on alert.

A terrorist incident on 4 July 1964 exacerbated the tension. A wattle factory worker, Petrus Oberholzer, was ambushed and murdered at a roadblock between Umtali and Melsetter by four ZANU men, part of a group of five which called itself the Crocodile Gang. Of the four perpetrators who were caught, two were hanged. ZANU and ZAPU were officially banned on 26 August 1964, and ZANU's leader and party secretary, the Reverend Ndabaningi Sithole and Robert Mugabe respectively, were arrested and imprisoned. The RLI was called into action against the two militant parties during August, taking part in Operation Valhalla alongside the RAR and assorted Territorial Force units. The army cordoned off Salisbury's townships and prevented movement in or out while British South Africa Police (BSAP) teams acted against political intimidation, arresting about 250 known agitators. Two months later the regiment found itself in a similar role when it and the RAR once again worked together on Operation Phoenix, which involved guarding the families of 600 chiefs and headmen participating in an indaba at Domboshawa, 27 kilometres (17 mi) north of Salisbury, on the subject of Rhodesian independence. The chiefs and headmen unanimously backed full statehood for Rhodesia under the extant government and 1961 constitution. In an independence referendum on 5 November, Rhodesia's predominantly white electorate backed independence by 89%.

On 24 October 1964, Northern Rhodesia became independent as Zambia, under the control of Kenneth Kaunda. The Southern Rhodesian government dropped the designation "Southern" from its name on the same day, but according to British constitutional theory this change was not official. The ZANU and ZAPU nationalists, whose respective leaders were incarcerated, now based themselves in Zambia and began to receive considerable communist backing. The People's Republic of China supported ZANU and its military wing, the Zimbabwe African National Liberation Army (ZANLA), and the Soviet Union assisted ZAPU and its Zimbabwe People's Revolutionary Army (ZIPRA).

=== Walls reforms the RLI into a commando battalion ===
Edwards was replaced as commanding officer of the RLI on 1 December 1964 by Lieutenant-Colonel Peter Walls. A personable, jovial commander, Walls shared Smith's views on the independence question, and less than a month after his appointment incurred a reproach from his superior, Brigadier Rodney Putterill, when he allowed his men to wear paper hats marked "RLI for UDI" at Christmas dinner. Walls had formed and commanded C Squadron (Rhodesian) SAS in Malaya during the early 1950s, and he was instructed to reform the RLI into a commando regiment along similar lines. Along with intensive specialist training, the new commanding officer replaced the peaked caps with tartan green berets to reinforce the battalion's new role. He also instituted a new structure: unlike most commando units, which are battalions in their own right, Walls decided to keep the RLI name and have the sub-units referred to as "Commandos". A Company was renamed 1 Commando, B Company became 2 Commando and C and D Companies combined to form 3 Commando. HQ Company was retitled Base Group, which also controlled Support Group. The result of this reorganisation was that the RLI, in its new commando form, comprised five troops, each of 25 men. During 1965 Walls expanded each Commando to number around 100 men, each divided into four troops. Each of these was in turn split into two 12-man patrols.

The recreation of the RLI as a commando battalion drew scepticism from elsewhere in the armed forces, and in part to prove doubters wrong Walls organised a demonstrative anti-guerrilla war game, Exercise Flick Knife, in May 1965. 1 and 3 Commando, acting as the security forces, set up separately at Inyanga and Chipinga while 2 Commando played the enemy guerrillas. Following about a week of repeated ambushes, pursuits and patrols by both sides across the unforgiving terrain, the "security forces" won the exercise. Played out under realistic battle conditions, the army was impressed both by the results of Exercise Flick Knife and by the troops' ability as commandos. The RLI then took part in Exercise Long Drag in August; this war game, organised by 2 Brigade specifically to further monitor the RLI in its new form, was similar to Flick Knife but much larger; it was staged all across the northern and eastern parts of the country and was scheduled to last two weeks. The three Commandos worked together with a helicopter squadron against an opposition made up of other units and handily defeated them, also capturing the two "enemy" commanders within hours of one another. The efficient cooperation with the air support and thorough victory showed, in Binda's words, that the RLI "had truly arrived and was a force to be reckoned with."

Apart from these exercises, the RLI Commandos garrisoned separate areas of the country; 1 Commando and the battalion headquarters were at Kariba, opposite the positions taken up by the Zambian Defence Force on the border. 2 Commando was at Chirundu, another town on the border with Zambia, and 3 Commando was split between Rhodesia's two Air Force bases: Salisbury's New Sarum base and Thornhill air base in Gwelo. The battalion received its Queen's and regimental colours, approved two years earlier, from the colonial Governor, Sir Humphrey Gibbs, on 19 June 1965. Meanwhile, negotiations between Smith and Harold Wilson's British Labour government broke down repeatedly throughout the year, leading the Rhodesian government to issue the Unilateral Declaration of Independence on 11 November 1965. Most RLI men supported Smith, the RF and UDI, and so saw this step as cause for celebration.

== UDI ==
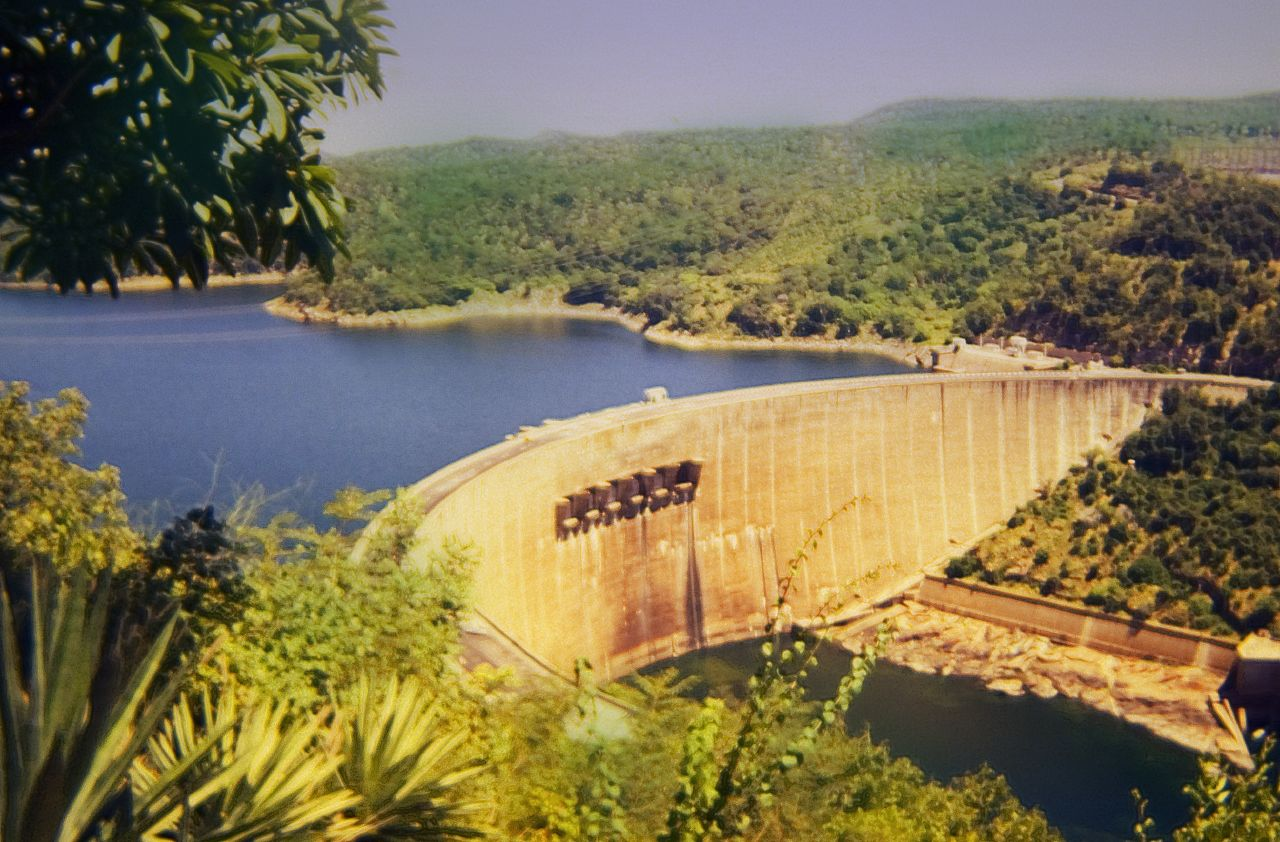
The Kariba Dam, seen in 1994 from above the southern side where 1 Commando was garrisoned when UDI was declared on 11 November 1965

On instructions from Gibbs, Putterill ordered all military personnel to remain at their posts and go about their normal duties. These instructions were followed but Gibbs's forbidding of any army or police servicemen to "assist the illegal régime ... in its rebellion against the Crown" was roundly ignored. Although the declaration had clearly stated that Rhodesia's loyalty to the monarchy was unaffected, the sympathy of Rhodesian soldiers and officers was quickly revealed to lie firmly with country, not Queen: when Rhodesian officers training in Britain were given an ultimatum to this effect, all but one returned home. Smith predicted confidently that despite the sabre-rattling of Kaunda and the UK's politicians, the British armed forces would never agree to engage in what he said would be a "fratricidal war" against Rhodesia. Nevertheless, the Rhodesian Security Forces prepared Operation Wizard, a secret contingency plan to counter an invasion by British or UN forces. Smith was proven correct when a British Ministry of Defence council, headed by Denis Healey, determined such intervention "impossible", leading Wilson to rule out the use of military force.

When Putterill visited the RLI garrison at the Kariba Dam early in the morning the day following UDI, he found the troopers there in fine spirits and described them as "perfectly cheerful". On the opposite side of the dam the Zambian defences were being inspected by British Major-General Willoughby, who had just flown in from his station at Aden where he had entertained Putterill only six weeks before. When Willoughby led a party of British and Zambian officers to the border at the centre of the dam, the RLI troopers heckled the group from their sandbagged bunkers on the southern side. "Great offence was taken at this insult to Willoughby's dignity," Wood writes. Despite the initial fears of an invasion the battalion's activities over the following months consisted merely of routine training and patrolling.

=== Operations Pagoda and Yodel ===
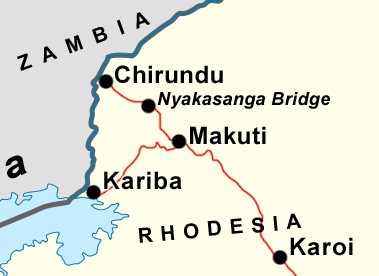
The RLI's "first proper contact"; Operation Yodel, September 1966

The first nationalist incursion following UDI came in March 1966, when four small groups of ZANLA insurgents crossed the Zambezi near Chirundu. One team of seven cadres contacted the BSAP near the northern town of Sinoia on 28 April 1966 and was wiped out, the police killing all seven without taking casualties. (Note: Today this is commemorated by ZANU–PF as the "Battle of Sinoia" and is the official start of what it calls the "Second Chimurenga". Chimurenga is a Shona word meaning "revolutionary struggle".) On 16 May another of the ZANLA groups murdered a farmer, Johannes Viljoen, and his wife at their farm just north of Hartley. 1 Commando and the police were deployed on Operation Pagoda, which ended on 18 September 1966, the BSAP having done most of the work; as the local police commanders were reluctant at this time to sign control over to the army, the RLI had been given little opportunity to act.

Operation Yodel, which Binda calls the RLI's "first proper contact", began when two ZANLA groups totalling 15 men entered Rhodesia near Chirundu on 13 September 1966. They intended to operate around Sinoia and Karoi, but one of the gangs made a serious error on 17 September when in the early evening it stopped a civilian van about 18 kilometres (11 mi) south of Chirundu. The guerrillas unsuccessfully demanded a lift to Sinoia, then murdered the driver and, in doing so, wrecked the vehicle. Captain R. E. H. "Dick" Lockley, acting commander of 1 Commando, sent out two groups: Lieutenant Garth Barrett was tasked to set up an ambush at Nyakasanga Bridge, about halfway between Chirundu and Makuti, while Lieutenant Trevor Desfountain led six troopers out to patrol the road between the two towns with 22 days' rations. Barrett's squad captured the group of seven which had killed the van driver while Desfountain's men contacted the other eight at 02:45 on 25 September, about 5 kilometres (3 mi) from Nyakasanga Bridge. The darkness was such that the two groups came within 20 yards (18 m) before noticing each other. After what Desfountain called "a fairly mean fire fight", the guerrillas fled, leaving two corpses—one that of their commander—and weapons, almost all of communist origin: two SKS semi-automatic rifles, an AK-47 assault rifle and Tokarev pistols, as well as an improvised "bamboo bazooka" and six packs. (Note: The "bamboo bazooka" was an improvised weapon first created by Mau Mau fighters in Kenya during their uprising against British rule in the 1950s.) One of Desfountain's men was injured, having been hit in the arm by fire from the guerrilla leader's AK-47. An insurgent was found alive the following morning by another patrol, left for dead with a bullet through his mouth. The other five were captured in Kariba's black township by Special Branch (SB) shortly after. Desfountain, as troop commander, was subpoenaed for murder and had to defend himself in court.

== Early counter-insurgency operations ==
=== Operation Nickel ===
The RLI continued to grow in strength during the latter part of 1966 and the beginning of 1967; it first began to experiment with parachutes early during this year, borrowing equipment from the SAS to do so. Walls was replaced as CO on 18 June 1967 by Lieutenant-Colonel Jack Caine, formerly of the British Coldstream Guards. The next guerrilla incursion came on 1 August 1967, when a combined force of 79 ZIPRA and South African Umkhonto we Sizwe (MK) fighters (Note: Umkhonto we Sizwe ("Spear of the Nation" in both Xhosa and Zulu) was the military wing of the African National Congress (ANC) of South Africa, and was commonly referred to in abbreviation as "MK". A military alliance between MK and ZIPRA guerrillas was announced on 19 August 1967 by ANC Deputy-President Oliver Tambo and James Chikerema, Vice-President of ZAPU.) crossed the Zambezi about 20 kilometres (12 mi) east of Victoria Falls. Having mislaid 10 men along the way, they based up a week later in the Wankie Game Reserve, in the extreme west of the country, near the border with Botswana. The cadres, whose intention was to recruit local black Rhodesians and subsequently attack white farms and police stations, split into two groups. One headed towards Tjolotjo and the other made for Nkai. One of the members who had become lost earlier was captured by the RAR on the road between Victoria Falls and Wankie on 3 August, and from this captive the police and security forces learned of the two groups and of their intentions. Operation Nickel, described by Ron Reid-Daly as one of "the most significant operations of the war," was launched.

At first the incursion was countered by the RAR, but after a tactical error in its third engagement with the guerrillas led to casualties, the African Rifles were joined by 2 Commando, RLI on 25 August 1967. The insurgents were consistently undone in their incursions by the suspicion of Rhodesia's rural blacks, whose tribal chiefs and headmen would often work together to inform the police and security forces of the infiltrators' presence. This proved to be no exception: when a cadre visited a local kraal early on 31 August to obtain food, an old woman invited him to stay and kept him there while she sent a young girl to alert the security forces. 7 Troop, 2 Commando arrived at 07:20 and captured the insurgent, who then guided 7 Troop, led by Lieutenant Charl Viljoen, and a platoon of RAR men to where his five comrades were encamped. The combined force surrounded the guerrillas and opened fire, killing four; the fifth escaped and returned to Zambia. The next day, on 1 September, some 2 Commando troops in ambush were informed by a tractor driver that he had been given money by 14 guerrillas the previous night to buy mielie-meal for them, and that they would be collecting it from him at his kraal that evening. A sweep was planned; the tractor driver was briefed and returned to the kraal with the mielie-meal while 2 Commando and the RAR formed a cordon around it. The following morning the soldiers performed their sweep but failed to find the enemy, who were already gone. The insurgents, who were actually 17 in number and all South African Umkhonto fighters, crossed the border into Botswana and were arrested there on 3 September. Of the 79 cadres who had crossed the border on 1 August, 29 were killed and 17 captured within Rhodesia, 29 were arrested in Botswana, where one also died, one was arrested in Durban and one escaped back to Zambia. One remained unaccounted for. Nickel was officially closed at 06:00 on 8 September 1967.

Prime Minister Ian Smith attended the RLI's Annual Regimental Sundowner on 1 February 1968, commemorating the founding of the battalion seven years earlier. Smith stood and proposed a toast to the regiment and the health of "the incredible Rhodesian Light Infantry". The toast was widely publicised by the Rhodesian press and had such impact that "The Incredibles" became a second nickname of the RLI alongside "The Saints". Captain F. Sutton, who had three years earlier composed the battalion's slow march, The Rhodesian Light Infantry, renamed the march The Incredibles.

=== Operation Cauldron ===
Despite the death or capture of 77 out of 79 men, ZAPU, from its base in the Zambian capital, Lusaka, did not regard the incursion as a failure; on the contrary, its leaders were pleased that they had inflicted some casualties on the Rhodesian African Rifles. Buoyed by what they perceived as a success, they planned another operation to take place in northern Mashonaland: about 100 men—75 ZIPRA and 25 MK—were to infiltrate the Zambezi valley and establish a series of camps, including underground caches containing food, clothing, weapons and other equipment. They were instructed to avoid the Rhodesian Security Forces "at all cost" while they recruited local tribesmen to the nationalist cause and trained them. Once a sufficient indigenous force existed, they were to inform Lusaka, which would then coordinate a mass uprising. The aim was not to defeat the government forces, but rather to force the British military to intervene. If the operation were a success, the MK men were to be escorted to South Africa to begin similar activities. The group, which in the actual event numbered 126, crossed the Zambezi around the turn of the year, with 34 entering Rhodesia on 28 December 1967 and the remainder joining them on the nights of 3, 4 and 5 January 1968. The guerrillas busied themselves working their way into the country, setting up camps as they went, naming each "Camp One", "Camp Two" and so on. After two and a half months in Rhodesia the ZIPRA cadres had created five bases, each further south than the next in an almost straight line pointing due south; the fifth was about halfway between Karoi and the border and nearly due east from Makuti. They remained undetected until unfamiliar bootprints were discovered by David Scammel, a game ranger, on a well-worn path, about the width of a "four-lane highway", on 14 March 1968 around the midpoint between Camps Four and Five. On closer inspection Scammel found scraps of a sugar packet marked with Russian lettering. So began Operation Cauldron.

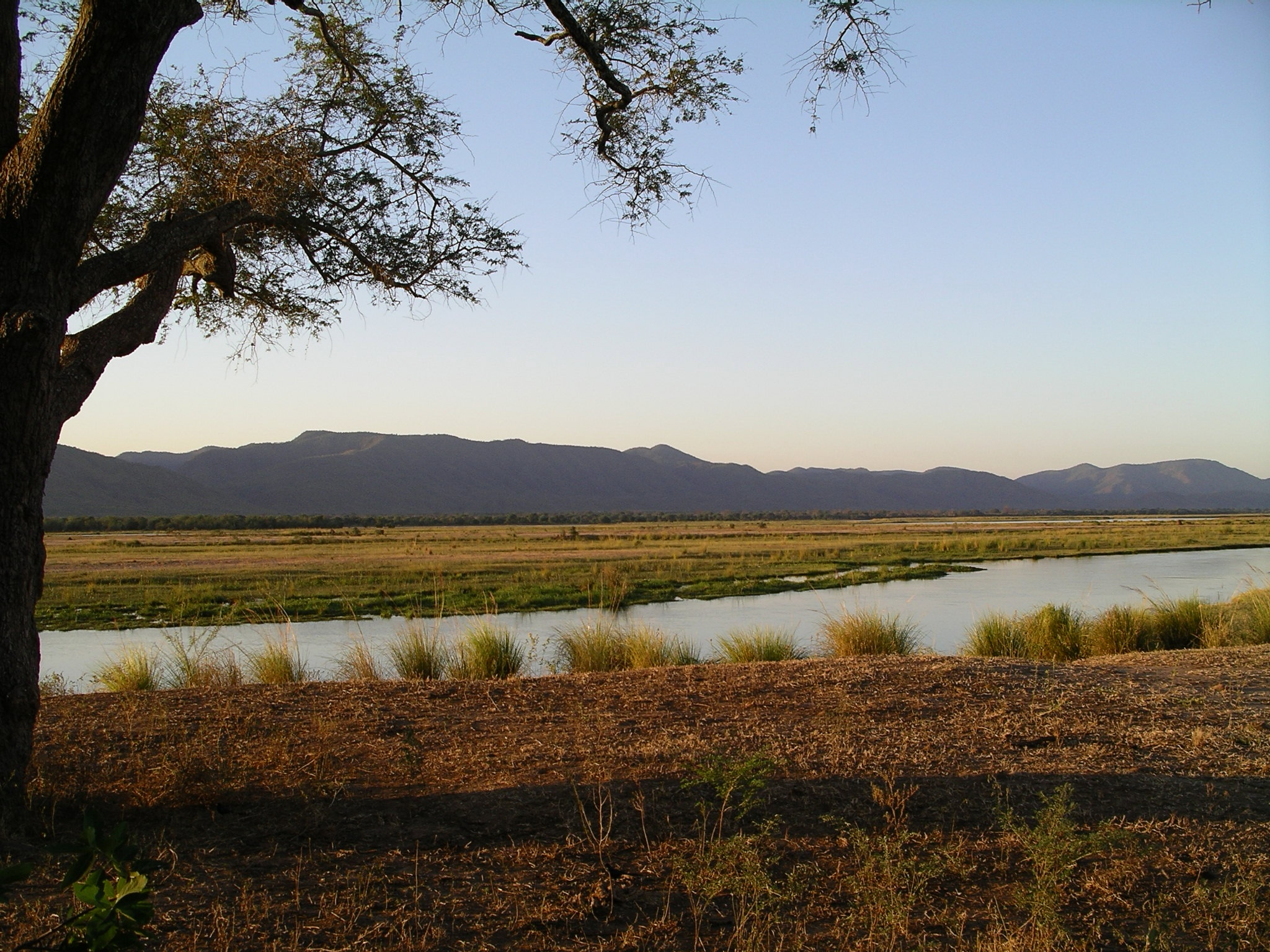
13 Troop, 3 Commando, under Lieutenant Sachse, made the first contact of Operation Cauldron on 18 March 1968 when they encountered the enemy in the Mana Pools.

"The appropriately named Cauldron," says Binda, "was to be the crucible in which the fighting character of the RLI was to be forged. ... It revealed to the world what outstanding and peerless anti-terrorist fighters the RLI were." A Joint Operations Centre (JOC) was formed on 16 March 1968 at Karoi, made up of two RAR platoons, a BSAP patrol and 1 and 3 Commandos, RLI. Two Vampire fighter-bombers and two Canberra bombers were detailed to circle the area and provide air strikes as needed; the mere presence of these aircraft demoralised many cadres into deserting before they even met the Rhodesian forces. A patrol of 13 troopers from 14 Troop, 3 Commando, led by Lieutenant Bert Sachse, made first contact with the enemy on the morning of 18 March, encountering 14 nationalists near the Angwa River in the Mana Pools area. Attacking an enemy on higher ground, Sachse's men killed 10 guerrillas but lost Trooper E. N. F. Ridge to sniper fire. He was first RLI soldier to be killed by enemy action. Nevertheless, the official operational report describes the contact as "a first-rate action in which Lieutenant Sachse's leadership and the determination of his men achieved an extremely successful result."

On the same day Lieutenant Chris Pearce's 13 Troop, 3 Commando, on patrol with a platoon of Rhodesian African Rifles under Lieutenant Ron Marillier, was fired upon on the bank of the Maura River in northern Mashonaland by about 70 ZIPRA, encamped in a strong defensive position on the side of a hill feature. "We were going on up the bank and all hell broke loose," recalled Pearce. "How we didn't take casualties I didn't quite know." Pearce's 12 men were pinned down by heavy machine-gun fire and outnumbered by around six to one. Lance-Corporal Dennis Croukamp "on his own initiative and with complete disregard for his own safety" in the words of the official report, twice crawled forward to throw grenades at the enemy position to allow the troop to redeploy into better cover. Pearce unsuccessfully attempted to assault the enemy position, then gave covering fire to an abortive flank attack by Marillier's RAR men. The security forces then attempted one final assault just before nightfall, but this also failed due to the superior numbers of ZIPRA fighters. (Note: Pearce and Croukamp were both awarded the Bronze Cross of Rhodesia on 23 October 1970 for their parts in this action.) The cadres dispersed and evacuated the area during the night and were gone when a Rhodesian sweep took place the next morning.

A series of contacts over the following days resulted in the guerrilla squads being split up and severely weakened, with the men who did not surrender or desert being killed or arrested; on 21 March, the insurgent commanders in Lusaka realised that their men had been detected and ordered the only remaining intact team, made up of 26 men, to return to Zambia. An assault on an enemy camp near Sipolilo on 26 March by 21 men from RLI Training Troop resulted in the deaths of two Troopers, R. A. Binks and G. D. Wessels. (Note: These 21 men had been due to pass out two weeks later but had been brought through early to assist in the operation.) By 27 March, 28 cadres had been killed and 15 captured; by 3 April, the figures stood at 36 dead and 24 in custody. Five more were arrested on 4 April and one shot dead by men from 1 Troop, 1 Commando, south of Makuti. "It now appeared obvious," says Binda, "that the insurgents had scattered and were on the run." On 9 April, the last contact with any significant number of guerrillas involved took place north of Karoi. A police unit and 4 Troop, 1 Commando encountered a group of insurgents and killed all seven, but lost Trooper M. E. Thornley to a fatal chest wound. When Operation Cauldron was closed on 31 May 1968, 58 of the 126 fighters who had crossed from Zambia had been confirmed killed and 51 were captured. Of the 17 outstanding, nine had returned to Zambia, leaving eight unaccounted for. Having acquitted themselves well during the operation, the young RLI troopers, many still teenagers, earned high praise from Platoon Warrant Officer Herod of the RAR, who had been wounded fighting alongside them on the Maura on 18 March 1968. "We of the RAR used to laugh at your soldiers," Herod said to RLI Sergeant Tim Baker, who was visiting him in hospital. "To us they looked like boys. But they showed us how to fight. They have the faces of boys, but they fight like lions."

=== Operation Flotilla ===
Covert coordinated efforts between the Rhodesian and Portuguese Armed Forces had started in 1967, and soon after Cauldron ended, the RLI was involved in a joint operation in Mozambique. A group of 17 Lusaka-based nationalists infiltrated Mozambique's north-western Tete Province, between Rhodesia and Malawi, in April 1968. Their presence was reported to Portuguese authorities on 20 May by local tribesmen from Catumbula, a small village just north of the Mazoe River, which in that area ran along the border with Rhodesia. A Portuguese patrol contacted and scattered the guerrillas the next day. The nationalist fighters, split into two groups, then moved towards Rhodesia, one team heading south-west and the other south. Acting on information given by the Portuguese, the Rhodesians started Operation Flotilla, based at the border town of Nyamapanda, on 23 May. 1 Commando, RLI was sent out on patrol the same day under Major Peter Rich. However, no trace of the insurgents was reported by Rich's men, apart from the tracks of six men on the northern (Mozambican) side of the Mazoe River. The cadres had not actually left Mozambique; a counter-insurgency effort by the Portuguese military and police resulted in most of them being captured or killed. Six who did eventually cross into Rhodesia in early June were captured by the BSAP.

=== Operation Griffin ===
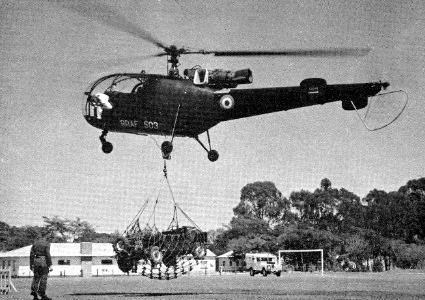
An Alouette III helicopter of the Rhodesian Air Force, pictured in 1962. Covering FN MAG fire from such an aircraft proved vital during the first contact of Operation Griffin on 18 July 1968.

A group of 28 ZIPRA insurgents entered from Zambia near Chirundu on 13 July 1968, with the intention of operating in the Hartley area where the Viljoens had been murdered four years earlier. Three days after the crossing, one of them became lost while on reconnaissance and gave himself up to police at Chirundu. He divulged the present location of his comrades, on the bank of the Zambezi, as well as where they had crossed the river. Operation Griffin started the same day, 16 July. A patrol of South African Police (SAP) was despatched along with a detachment of RLI men from 3 Commando and some from E Company, RAR, who were in the area on border patrol. Noticing the increased helicopter activity of the security forces, the cadres realised they had been detected and moved into a defensive position in a deep gully. The two sides contacted on the morning of 18 July, when the insurgents opened fire on 12 Troop, 3 Commando, led by Second Lieutenant Jerry Strong. The Rhodesians were initially pinned down but Strong and Lance-Corporal Terry Lahee crawled forward on their bellies and provided covering rifle fire, also tossing grenades at the enemy to allow 12 Troop to find better cover; the official report calls this an "act of supreme gallantry [which] undoubtedly saved the lives of several of the troopers who were in exposed positions." (Note: Strong was awarded the Bronze Cross of Rhodesia on 23 October 1970 for his "leadership and gallantry of the highest order" in these two actions, as well as in a contact with three guerillas near Mangula on 2 April 1968 during Operation Cauldron. Lahee concurrently received a Bronze Cross of his own for his part in the action on 18 July 1968, in which he and Strong had together covered their exposed comrades' retreat with grenades and rifle fire.) Covering FN MAG fire from a Royal Rhodesian Air Force (RRAF) Alouette III helicopter, with Major Robert Southey aboard, then allowed Strong's men to pull back. 12 Troop joined up with 14 Troop, the SAP and the RAR platoon on a ridge to the north of the ZIPRA position. The SAP attempted to descend into the gully from the eastern end but found themselves trapped on the slopes by shooting from the insurgents.

The Alouette was then hit and, although only lightly damaged, forced to withdraw, leaving the ground troops without covering MAG fire. Now covered by the Rhodesian ground troops and Frantans (Note: A "Frantan" was a small Rhodesian-made napalm bomb developed by the Royal Rhodesian Air Force during the 1960s. They were 1.8 metres (5 ft 11 in) long and filled with about 73 litres (16 imp gal; 19 US gal) of napalm. To hide their nature and purpose during development they were referred to as "frangible tanks", which gave rise to the abbreviation "Frantan", which stuck.) dropped by Percival Provosts, the South Africans made several unsuccessful attempts to pull back from the banks of the gully throughout the afternoon which led to two injuries and the death of Constable du Toit. The SAP men were eventually able to withdraw under cover of darkness, while Rhodesian and South African injured were uplifted by helicopter in an action described by Southey as "sheer brilliance". "Norman Walsh and Peter Nicholls [the two helicopter pilots] faced great difficulty because of steep mountainsides and the blackness of the night in conditions of thick haze," writes Peter Petter-Bowyer, then an RRAF flight lieutenant. "Visual contact with [the] ground [was] impossible until dangerously low and close." Flying at such low altitude, each pilot was blinded by the reflection of his own landing light when he looked towards the ground. Walsh noticed that he could clearly see the ground beneath the other helicopter's light, and so instructed Nicholls to turn off his landing light and allow him to illuminate the landing site for him. "This worked like a charm," says Petter-Bowyer. Guided by Walsh's landing light, Nicholls safely landed and collected some of the casualties, then did the same for Walsh as he picked up the rest. Flares were dropped during the night to help the ground troops search for guerrilla movement but none was seen.

The RLI, meanwhile, was redeployed by Southey, and positioned to seal off likely escape routes from the gully. Ambushes were set up on each ridge and at both ends of the gully. At dawn four guerrillas attempted to break through a 3 Commando stop position at the eastern end; unfortunately for the insurgents, this ambush was headed by Commando Sergeant Major Al Tourle, a particularly aggressive soldier nicknamed "Bangstick", whose men shot and killed all four. Southey then led 12 and 14 Troops on a sweep of the gully from the west and found that the ZIPRA fighters had vacated their position, leaving most of their equipment. Two cadres hiding in a cave opened fire on Southey's men and were killed. Two insurgent bodies were found, burnt by the Frantans. By noon on 19 July the area was clear; 10 guerrillas had been killed while the security forces had lost one and suffered six wounded. Headquarters was moved to Kariba while 2 Commando was brought in from Salisbury to assist in locating the remaining cadres.

Strong led a sweep up the river and met with no resistance while a squad of trackers including Tourle moved south, towards Kariba. This latter group spotted the 10 insurgents in ambush in another gully at 13:30 on 19 July and a fierce battle ensued. The RLI squad leader's faulty radio set meant that he was unable to issue orders, leading Tourle to take the initiative by shouting orders to soldiers around him. This made him the subject of concentrated ZIPRA fire, but he nevertheless directed the RLI actions throughout the contact while also accounting for most of the opposing force personally. "Tourle," says Binda, "armed with an MAG, moved with one other man to a rocky outcrop overlooking the enemy position and laid down a withering fire." Under this cover Corporals Johnstone and Strydom flanked right and eliminated a ZIPRA sniper, while Corporal Kirkwood and Lance-Corporal Coom moved to the left. A sweep was then carried out, during which a guerrilla jumped out of cover and opened fire, wounding Coom; Johnstone killed the insurgent. The remainder of the search revealed the other nine cadres dead, six having been killed by Tourle. (Note: For his "gallantry and leadership" in this action, Al Tourle was awarded the Bronze Cross of Rhodesia on 23 October 1970.) The remaining seven cadres were captured or killed over the course of the next week, leaving none unaccounted for when the operation ended at 12:00 on 26 July 1968.

=== Operation Excess ===
There was no time for 2 and 3 Commandos, RLI to rest. Operation Excess began at Makuti the very next day, 27 July 1968, to counter another group of ZIPRA which had crossed the Zambezi in northern Mashonaland on 12 July. This squad was organised in five sections, three of eight men each and two of seven men each. Heading for Mount Darwin, about 150 kilometres (93 mi) north-east of Salisbury, their objective was to subvert local tribesmen and recruit some for training overseas. They were detected on 26 July when a Ministry of Internal Affairs (INTAF) employee discovered unfamiliar bootprints in the bush near Makuti. JOC was moved south-east to Karoi on 28 July, and 2 Commando was deployed there. 3 Commando was sent with Tactical HQ to patrol the Angwa River Bridge, to the north-east, near the border with Mozambique. Support Group, which was already based up at Kanyemba, sent one of its troops into the area along with six Police Anti-Terrorist Unit (PATU) teams. E Company, RAR moved to the west to act as stops. 7 Troop, 2 Commando and the Support Group troop followed tracks to discover a vacant insurgent camp in the early morning on 28 July; the guerrillas had been made nervous by the increased helicopter activity north of their location and left. Pearce's 13 Troop found fresh tracks the next morning and followed them.

Pearce reported that the guerrillas numbered about 50, and followed them eastwards during 28 July. Flight Lieutenant Petter-Bowyer led a detail of four Alouette IIIs providing air support. Petter-Bowyer's helicopters spotted the insurgents encamped by a stream beneath some dark, shady trees, leading Strong's 12 Troop, 3 Commando to be brought forward to contact them the following morning. Strong's fresh men were sent into the trees while Pearce was reluctantly forced to withdraw and provide back-up. Strong called back almost immediately after entering, "Terrs left about one minute ago – in a hurry. There is abandoned equipment—no time to collect—moving east on tracks." 12 Troop pursued the guerrillas and trackers found that they numbered only about 20, meaning that the majority had gone in another direction. Pearce, who had been sent into the camp after Strong, found tracks from the remainder of the cadres that headed south. He followed them while 12 Troop continued to head east and reached the Mozambican border at nightfall on 30 July. At this time they were able to confirm from bootprints at the road crossing that the exact number of ZIPRA they were pursuing was 15.

12 Troop entered Mozambique on 31 July 1968 and contacted the enemy around noon, when Strong heard voices ahead and ordered his men out for a sweep. The guerrillas, encamped under trees on a slightly higher position on the other side of a dry riverbed, opened fire, wounding an RLI trooper. Strong called on the insurgents to surrender, to which they responded with obscenities and anti-white racist slogans before resuming fire. 12 Troop took cover and tossed phosphorus grenades to mask their advance; the men on the left rushed up the slope beneath the smoke and positioned themselves to the cadres' right. Under attack from the front and the right flank, the ZIPRA fighters soon fled, leaving seven dead and one wounded. Petter-Bowyer and the helicopters now arrived to give air support and wounded two insurgents, who took cover in a small, naturally formed tunnel. Lance-Corporal Lahee and one other man chased them to the tunnel and captured them. Of the remaining five guerrillas, four were killed and one captured. The focus now moved to the other group of cadres being chased south by Pearce's men.

The presence of guerrillas to the south was reported by local tribesmen, leading a troop under Lieutenant Fanie Coetzee to investigate. A group of insurgents opened fire on Coetzee's troop from a high ridge, but he was able to move his men gradually around their flank to their rear, from where Petter-Bowyer says "he gave the terrorists a serious walloping". 1 Commando, RLI was called in to assist with the search for the remaining cadres while the Portuguese placed some troops on the border. A 1 Commando troop discovered tracks of 16 men heading south-south-east on 1 August 1968 and another found tracks of three going north-west. The next day three insurgents were captured by police. Between 2 and 6 August the police killed one guerrilla and captured several more. By the morning of 7 August there remained 11 cadres at large, but after no progress was made over the following days the operation was closed down on 12 August, the JOC resolving that the outstanding guerrillas had most probably returned to Zambia. Over the next month three more bodies were found and one captured, leaving seven unaccounted for. Around the same time the RAR defeated a third ZIPRA group of 25 men in Operation Mansion, killing six and capturing 18, as well as 14 ZANLA cadres, of whom four were killed and 10 arrested during Operation Gravel.

== More attempts for settlement; the armed struggle stagnates ==
Lieutenant-Colonel J. S. V. Hickman took over from Caine as commanding officer on 26 August 1968 and the rest of the year was uneventful for the RLI. The same was not true, however, for the Rhodesian government, which on 20 September 1968 accepted an invitation from Wilson for a new round of talks, this time aboard HMS Fearless, anchored off Gibraltar, for four days starting on 9 October 1968. These ended without agreement on the evening of 13 October 1968, when Smith flew back to Rhodesia. Unsuccessful attempts by both sides to salvage an accord from the Fearless talks continued for months afterwards but ultimately Smith's government resolved that compromise was impossible. It prepared a new constitution of its own and on 20 June 1969 called a constitutional referendum, polling public opinion on both the new constitution and the adoption of a republican form of government. The electorate firmly backed both of these proposals. As a result, Rhodesia became a republic with the new constitution in place on 2 March 1970.

=== Operation Oyster ===
The closest the RLI came to action during 1969 was Operation Oyster, which was handled for the most part by the BSAP. On 19 March 1969, insurgents fired upon a white couple driving a car from Malawi near the Nyadiri Bridge, 42 kilometres (26 mi) north-east of Mrewa, itself about 70 kilometres (43 mi) east of Salisbury. Of the 12 AK-47 bullets fired, two hit the car: the husband, behind the wheel, was wounded in the leg and foot, but the wife was unharmed. The BSAP launched their operation the same day and the RLI became involved ten days later, on 29 March, when 2 Commando was brought in to patrol the area between Mrewa and Mount Darwin along with PATU sticks and air support from the RRAF. The joint force discovered an empty camp for four insurgents on 30 March and encountered two more the next day; after briefly exchanging fire the two guerrillas fled. The security forces continued to search the area until 5 April, when they withdrew. The operation was shut down on 14 April, with no cadres captured, though around a dozen ZAPU sympathisers had been arrested. The guerrillas moved south-west and eventually entered Botswana, from where they returned to Zambia.

=== Operation Birch ===
ZAPU's vice-president, James Chikerema, planned another infiltration from Zambia during the final months of 1969, intending to send 25 of ZIPRA's best fighters across the Zambezi and then on to four separate destinations, split into four "gangs": Gang 1 would make for Melsetter in the south-east of the country, Gang 2 would head for Umtali on the Rhodesia–Mozambique border, and Gangs 3 and 4 would go to the north-eastern towns of Mtoko and Mount Darwin respectively. Three of the 25 refused to operate in Mashonaland, saying that they would only fight for ZIPRA in Matabeleland. Five cadres scouted ahead of the main group from 11 to 14 December 1969, identifying a safe crossing point and inspecting the route to be taken by the main infiltration squad. The rest of the 22 insurgents crossed during the nights of 30 and 31 December. The ZIPRA men then made their way south and on 17 January 1970 split up at the foot of the Zambezi escarpment, about 8 kilometres (5 mi) west of the Hunyani River. They were detected the following day when two of the five cadres from Gang 1 revealed themselves to a guard manning a fly-gate at Tondongwe in the Doma Safari Area. After selling some food to the guerrillas, the guard reported the incident and Operation Birch was initiated.

The security forces set up a JOC at Mangula at 09:30 on 19 January with 1 Commando present. A tracking team led by Lieutenant Nigel Henson first made contact around noon on 21 January, when concealed ZIPRA cadres from Gang 2 fired upon them with an RPD machine-gun and AK-47 and SKS rifles. Henson's men withdrew and 1 Commando set up stop points around the contact area to contain the guerrillas during the day; night-ambush positions were then set up as darkness fell. The RLI moved up again at dawn the next day and met the insurgents at 07:30, when a stick of five 1 Commando men led by Lieutenant Bruce Snelgar was sighted in an area of thick bush by three guerrillas from Gang 2. The cadres caught Snelgar's stick by surprise, opening fire with a heavy burst of RPD bullets. Snelgar and Trooper McMaster were wounded and Trooper Anthony Brading was shot dead. In the battle which ensued all three ZIPRA fighters were killed with no further loss to the RLI.

Over the next few days PATU and RLI patrols arrested five insurgents, two of whom were deserters. One of these defected and agreed to guide the security forces to the ZIPRA base camp, where he said there were two guerrillas waiting for him to return, unaware of his desertion and subsequent defection. Shown the way by the ex-cadre an RLI patrol attacked the camp on 24 January and killed one of the two; the other fled and was captured a few days later. The members of Gang 1 were now all killed or captured while only one was outstanding from Gang 2. Gangs 3 and 4 were revealed to be near Sipolilo on 21 January by a black shopkeeper, and two Gang 3 members were encountered by Henson's troop on 24 January. Henson himself opened fire and killed one, who it emerged was the Gang 3 commander. His troop then followed about 10 men until 26 January, when they lost the insurgents' tracks.

RLI patrols were intensified further over the following days, with 3 Commando being brought in to assist around Sipolilo. 13 Troop, 3 Commando, under Sergeant Phil Raath, encountered the 10 cadres at a kraal near Bakasa, north of Sipolilo, on 31 January, and killed one; the other nine fled. Later that day a patrol led by Corporal Dennis Croukamp captured Phinias Majuru, the ZIPRA Director of Operations. "It was only a week later after the patrol was over that we learnt who it was we had captured", Croukamp writes. "It was Joshua Nkomo's Chief of Operations. The equivalent of a very senior staff officer, he was in the country trying to determine why ZIPRA was being so unsuccessful and he was on his way back with recommendations, clipboard and all." The remaining ZIPRA fighters scattered and escaped the area over the following week, the Rhodesian Security Forces losing track of each one. On 9 February 1970 local security force presence was reduced to police, one helicopter and one RLI Commando. A member of Gang 3 was arrested by the Portuguese in Mozambique the next day, but without further developments over the next month, Operation Birch shut down on 5 March 1970. Two more members of Gang 4 were detained by police in Mukumbura township on 21 March, and three days later the Portuguese killed one and captured another. The final account for Operation Birch, which had countered the last ZIPRA incursion for six years, was seven cadres killed, thirteen captured and two outstanding. "From 1970 onward, ZAPU played no part in the terrorist war," writes Lieutenant-Colonel R. E. H. Lockley. "They were in a state of disarray following their decisive defeats within Rhodesia, so they took the opportunity of consolidating their position by sending their terrorists outside the country on extended courses to Russia, Cuba and North Korea. This situation with ZAPU continued until 1976. ... There were no incursions in 1970 worthy of note."

=== Trooping the Colour and the tenth anniversary tattoo ===
The RLI trooped the Colour for the only time on 27 July 1970. Among the 3,000 spectators at Cranborne Barracks were the mayor and mayoress of Salisbury, the commanders of 2 and 3 Brigades and the commanding officer of the Rhodesian African Rifles. Regimental Sergeant Major Robin Tarr began the proceedings at 10:35, at which time the RAR band and drums started to play the RLI's slow march, The Incredibles, as the RLI troopers marched onto the parade square in divisions. Minister of Defence Jack Howman and Prime Minister Smith then arrived in turn to inspect the men, following which Smith presented Mrs Veronica Ferreira with her late husband Wally's posthumous presidential commendation for bravery. (Note: Colour Sergeant Wally Ferreira died on 13 December 1968 while attempting to save the life of Lieutenant Charl Viljoen, who had fallen into the Zambezi and was drowning. Ferreira jumped in to save him and was also drowned.) The regimental colour was then trooped before finally the RLI men performed a march-past in slow and quick time. At the end of the parade, Lieutenant-Colonel Hickman announced his departure from the battalion, having been promoted; his replacement was Lieutenant-Colonel A. N. O. MacIntyre.

The tenth anniversary of the RLI's formation on 1 February 1961 was commemorated on 30 January 1971 with a special military tattoo, held at Glamis Stadium in Salisbury. The battalion spent three weeks rehearsing for the three-hour tattoo, which was the first held by a single military unit in Rhodesia. The men gave demonstrations of drilling, physical training and unarmed combat; a staged assault on a guerrilla camp was held by 2 Commando, using blank ammunition and dummy mortars. The show culminated with a sky-dive by three Battalion Parachute Club members, Captain Garth Barrett, Sergeant Dennis Croukamp and Major John Pierson. Following this a retreat ceremony was held as well as a final march-past by all participants.

== Notes and references ==
=== Journal articles ===
- Harris, P. B. (September 1969). "The Rhodesian Referendum: June 20th, 1969" (PDF). Parliamentary Affairs. 23 (1969sep). Oxford University Press: 72–80. doi:10.1093/parlij/23.1969sep.72. Archived from the original (PDF) on 4 February 2016.
- Lockley, Lt-Col R. E. H. (July 1990). "A brief operational history of the campaign in Rhodesia from 1964 to 1978". The Lion & Tusk. 2 (1). Southampton: Rhodesian Army Association. Archived from the original on 25 May 2022.
- Streak, Brian, ed. (31 October 1980). The Cheetah. Salisbury: The Rhodesian Light Infantry Regimental Association.

=== Bibliography ===
- Binda, Alexandre (May 2008). The Saints: The Rhodesian Light Infantry. Johannesburg: 30° South Publishers. ISBN 978-1-920143-07-7.
- Cilliers, Jakkie (December 1984). Counter-Insurgency in Rhodesia. London, Sydney & Dover, New Hampshire: Croom Helm. ISBN 978-0-7099-3412-7.
- Croukamp, Dennis E. W. (December 2005). Only My Friends Call Me "Crouks": Rhodesian reconnaissance specialist. Cape Town: Pseudo Publishing. ISBN 978-0-620-29392-1.
- Martin, David; Johnson, Phyllis (July 1981). The Struggle for Zimbabwe (First ed.). London: Faber and Faber. ISBN 978-0-571-11066-7.
- Moorcraft, Paul L.; McLaughlin, Peter (April 2008) [1982]. The Rhodesian War: A Military History. Barnsley: Pen and Sword Books. ISBN 978-1-84415-694-8.
- Palley, Claire (1966). The constitutional history and law of Southern Rhodesia 1888–1965, with special reference to Imperial control (First ed.). Oxford: Clarendon Press. ASIN B0000CMYXJ.
- Petter-Bowyer, P. J. H. (November 2005) [2003]. Winds of Destruction: the Autobiography of a Rhodesian Combat Pilot. Johannesburg: 30° South Publishers. ISBN 978-0-9584890-3-4.
- Sellström, Tor (March 1999). Sweden and National Liberation in Southern Africa. Volume I: Formation of a Popular Opinion 1950–1970. Uppsala: Nordic Africa Institute. ISBN 978-91-7106-430-1.
- Sibanda, Eliakim M. (January 2005). The Zimbabwe African People's Union 1961–87: A Political History of Insurgency in Southern Rhodesia. Trenton, New Jersey: Africa Research & Publications. ISBN 978-1-59221-276-7.
- Smith, Ian (June 1997). The Great Betrayal: The Memoirs of Ian Douglas Smith. London: John Blake Publishing. ISBN 1-85782-176-9.
- The South African Democracy Education Trust ("SADET") (November 2005). The Road to Democracy in South Africa, Volume 1, 1960–1970. Cape Town: Struik Publishers. ISBN 978-1-86872-906-7.
- Thomas, Scott (December 1995). The Diplomacy of Liberation: the Foreign Relations of the ANC Since 1960 (First ed.). London: I.B. Tauris. ISBN 1-85043-993-1.
- van Rensburg, A. P. J. (1975). Contemporary Leaders of Africa. Cape Town: HAUM. ISBN 0-7986-0156-6. OCLC 1676807.
- Wessels, Hannes (July 2010). P. K. van der Byl: African Statesman. Johannesburg: 30° South Publishers. ISBN 978-1-920143-49-7.
- Williams, Gwyneth; Hackland, Brian (July 1988). The Dictionary of Contemporary Politics of Southern Africa (First ed.). London: Routledge. ISBN 978-0-415-00245-5.
- Wood, J. R. T. (June 2005). So far and no further! Rhodesia's bid for independence during the retreat from empire 1959–1965. Victoria, British Columbia: Trafford Publishing. ISBN 978-1-4120-4952-8.
- Wood, J. R. T. (April 2008). A matter of weeks rather than months: The Impasse between Harold Wilson and Ian Smith: Sanctions, Aborted Settlements and War 1965–1969. Victoria, British Columbia: Trafford Publishing. ISBN 978-1-4251-4807-2.

=== Further reading ===
- Bond, Geoffrey (1977). The Incredibles: The Story of the 1st Battalion, The Rhodesian Light Infantry. Salisbury: Sarum Imprint. ISBN 0-7974-0233-0.
- Cocks, Chris (June 2009) [1988]. Fireforce: One Man's War in the Rhodesian Light Infantry (Fourth ed.). Johannesburg: 30° South Publishers. ISBN 978-0-9584890-9-6.
- Coey, John Alan (March 1988). A Martyr Speaks (First ed.). Fletcher, North Carolina: New Puritan Library. ISBN 978-0-932050-41-0.
- Gledhill, Dick (November 2001). One Commando: Rhodesian Light Infantry (Second ed.). Roodepoort: Covos Books. ISBN 978-1-919874-35-7.
