= Police support unit =

A Police support unit may refer to:

- Police support unit (United Kingdom), a unit of British police officers trained in public order
- Police Support Unit, a paramilitary unit of the British South Africa Police in Rhodesia and later Zimbabwe Republic Police
