= Guard Force (Rhodesia) =

Former arm of the Rhodesian Security Forces

- Active: 1 February 1976–May 1980
- Disbanded: May 1980
- Country: Rhodesia
- Allegiance: Republic of Rhodesia (1976–79); Zimbabwe Rhodesia (1979); United Kingdom (1979–80); Zimbabwe (1980)
- Branch: Ground Forces
- Type: Static defence
- Garrison/HQ: Salisbury, Rhodesia
- Equipment: Lee-Enfield FN FAL Heckler & Koch G3
- Engagements: Rhodesian Bush War

Commanders
- First Commander: Major General G. A. D. Rawlins (1976–1977)
- Second and Last Commander: Brigadier W. A. Godwin (1977–1979)

The Guard Force was an arm of the Rhodesian Security Forces. Coming under the Ministry of Defence it was organised on similar lines to, but separate from, the Rhodesian Army. The Guard Force was set up from 1975 (and formally established on 1 February 1976) to provide security to protected villages. These had been established by the Ministry of Internal Affairs to separate black rural civilians from guerillas during the Rhodesian Bush War. Guard Force units took over security duties from Ministry staff.

From 1977 the Guard Force was reformed, becoming more pro-active. Rather than an entirely static rural force it carried out patrols and ambushes and guarded key urban points and lines of communication. Infantry battalions were introduced in 1978 to better suit its new role. By the end of the Bush War in 1979 it numbered 7,000 men. The Guard Force became redundant with the transfer to black-majority rule (as Zimbabwe) in 1980 and was disbanded.

The Guard Force was criticised as poorly trained and had low morale. Its white recruits came from classes of national servicemen and elderly reservists who failed to qualify for more prestigious duties. The men received lower pay than the army.

== Creation as a defensive force ==
During the Rhodesian Bush War the white minority-led government resettled large numbers of black citizens into "protected villages" to isolate them from Zimbabwe African National Union and Zimbabwe African People's Union guerrillas (as in the July 1974 Operation Overload). The protected villages were initially guarded by personnel from the Ministry of Internal Affairs, which had been augmented with white national service men, who employed black district security assistants. By 1975 it had become apparent that the department lacked the capacity to provide ongoing security to the protected villages whilst also planning the resettlement of large swaths of the country into new villages. The Guard Force was established to assume the security role.

The Guard Force was modelled on the predominantly black Kikuyu Home Guard who had served to guard local areas in Kenya during the 1950s Mau Mau Uprising. The Guard Force was multi-racial with black and white personnel serving as officers and enlisted members, though the majority of its personnel were black. The unit took over half of the Ministry of Internal Affairs allocation of national servicemen and also absorbed many of its district security assistants as guards. The Guard Force focused on former black members of the Rhodesian African Rifles for recruitment to positions as local commanders.

The first recruits were brought into the Guard Force in August 1975 and were trained by former Rhodesian Army personnel at the Interior Ministry's Chikurubi training base, which became the unit's new depot. The Guard Force was officially established as part of the Ministry of Defence on 1 February 1976 with a headquarters established at Salisbury. The Guard Force was initially given only one duty, the security of protected villages. Guard Force's jurisdiction did not extend to all villages, some, as in the Chiweshe Tribal Trust Land, remained under the guard of the Interior Ministry.

The average protected village housed 4,000 people in a fenced area measuring 4 by 4 kilometres (2.5 mi × 2.5 mi). In the centre of the village was the "keep", a concrete bunker surrounded by a defensive earth wall. The keep's garrison consisted of 20 men but as few as 12 were often on duty owing to leave and sickness. The villages were widely dispersed and each keep was often commanded by a non-commissioned officer. Junior officers sometimes had command of forward command posts, controlling several keeps. Above the junior officers were group headquarters under a commandant. The first commander of the Guard Force was Major General G. A. D. "Andrew" Rawlins, who had been brought out of army retirement. Non-commissioned ranks were unique but similar to the army. The lowest enlisted rank was that of guard, above them were junior corporals, keep corporals, keep (or guard) sergeants, keep (or guard) senior sergeants, keep sergeant majors and keep (or guard) warrant officers in two classes (I and II). The Guard Force was initially equipped with obsolete Lee-Enfield bolt-action rifles but later received worn out FN FAL automatics from the army and eventually brand new Heckler & Koch G3 rifles.

== Transition to more active role ==
Brigadier W. A. Godwin was appointed to command in February 1977, as Rawlins became director of psychological warfare in the Rhodesian Army. In May the Guard Force was reorganised, moving from its purely static role into a more pro-active force that would carry out patrols and ambushes. From 1978 the force became responsible for protection of white-owned farms and later took over guard duties from the police at a number of fixed sites and lines of communication. An infantry battalion, the 1st Battalion Guard Force, was formed in May 1978 and in the same year it took over responsibility for guarding some urban strongpoints and railway lines. In line with these new responsibilities it grew from around 1,000 men in 1977 to 3,500 (protecting more than 200 villages) in 1978. By the end of the Bush War in 1979 it numbered some 7,000 men. By this point the defensive role in the villages had been taken over partly by the Ministry of Internal Affairs and the Security Force Auxiliaries, a black pro-government militia, and the Guard Force was divided into 7 battalions. The battalions were issued 60mm French commando mortars, but these were of limited range (1,000 metres; 3,300 ft) and they were issued with only five rounds per weapon. Rhodesia transitioned to a black majority government in April 1980, as Zimbabwe, and by May the Guard Force was being disbanded.

== Effectiveness ==
The effectiveness of the Guard Force has been questioned by historians. Peter Baxter, writing in 2014, described it as a "a modestly trained paramilitary unit" that was intended for rearline duties but often found itself in action as the protected villages became targets for attack by the guerrillas, who were less keen on engaging the Rhodesian Army. As the inhabitants of the villages endured poor living conditions and an often tyrannical rule by the Guard Force, they often welcomed their "liberation" by the guerillas. Historian Paul L. Moorcraft states that the Guard Force "often committed crimes against the populations they were charged with protecting" and concurs with Baxter's assessment of them as a rearline unit: "had they stood against a determined, well-trained enemy they would have had little chance". Standards were different in villages guarded by other units, such as the Ministry for Interior Affairs.

The Guard Force suffered from morale and disciplinary problems. They were not helped by the quality of the men they received and the general reputation of the unit as inefficient. The national service men they were assigned were usually the lowest quality from that particular draft, including those deemed unfit for regular service, and reservists attached to the unit were often elderly. As such the white members of the unit were considered the "dregs of society". The efficiency and morale of the Guard Force was not helped by the fact that the men were usually posted outside of their home districts and received no pension benefits, unlike the police, army or air force, and lower pay than equivalents in these branches.

In its later years the quality of Guard Force training increased. In June 1978 a combined Protection Brigade was formed of territorial Rhodesian Defence Regiment troops and members of the Guard Force, in an attempt to use veteran officers of the former to bring up standards in the latter.

== Ranks ==
Commissioned officer ranks

Rank group	General / flag officers	Senior officers			Junior officers
Rhodesian Guard Force
Rhodesian Guard Force	Commander	Deputy Commander	Senior Commandant	Commandant	Assistant Commandant	Junior Commandant II	Junior Commandant I

Other ranks

Rank group	Senior NCOs					Junior NCOs		Enlisted
Rhodesian Guard Force								No insignia
Rhodesian Guard Force	Keep commander	Deputy keep commander	Keep warrant officer	Keep senior sergeant	Keep sergeant	Keep corporal	Junior corporal	Guard

== See also ==
- Conscription in Rhodesia
