= A Fair Cop =

2008 memoir by Michael Bunting

- First edition
- Publisher: The Friday Project
- Publication date: 1 Oct 2008
- Media type: Print
- Pages: 352
- ISBN: 978-1-906321-71-0

A Fair Cop is a 2008 memoir by Michael Bunting, a former British police officer. After attending an incident during the course of his duties, Bunting was found guilty of common assault of a member of the public. Bunting claims that he is innocent of the crime and tells his side of the story in A Fair Cop. The book was published by The Friday Project, with the book currently being written to become a screen drama. Bunting is now a restorative justice campaigner.

== Summary ==
The book follows Bunting's narration of the events that lead up to his sentencing on September 8, 1999, when Bunting was sentenced to spend four months at HMP Armley Prison for charges of common assault. During his prison sentence Bunting was physically threatened and verbally abused by the other inmates, who also tampered with his food. Because of these threats, Bunting was placed in the hospital wing for his own safety.

Bunting then details his time at the West Yorkshire Police Training School, his formal acceptance into the service where he is given his father's old West Riding Constabulary's collar number, and his reactions to some of the situations he had to respond to as a police officer. Bunting later joins the Police Support Unit and helps in trying to quell the Bradford Riots.

On August 24, 1997, Bunting responds to a domestic disturbance report at a private residence where he and two other officers encounter two males. One is immediately arrested, but the other grows increasingly more hostile and Bunting warns him that exhibiting such behaviour could result in his arrest. Bunting is then assaulted by the man, receiving numerous injuries such as a broken tooth and swelling to his left cheek and eye. One of the other officers uses CS spray in an attempt to quell the attack, but sprays Bunting in the process. Later Bunting is examined by a doctor for his injuries, having also experienced difficulty with his vision. The doctor concludes that the disturbance in vision was attributable to an injury Bunting sustained during the attack.

Five weeks later the Discipline and Complaints Department then inform Bunting that he is under investigation for an assault because a member of the public complained about his conduct during the incident. Bunting is later charged with common assault due to his attacker accused him of using excessive force while Bunting was attempting to defend himself and subdue his attacker. Bunting was also forced to give his home address in open court at Wakefield Magistrates Court, where his assaulter and the media are present. He requests that he be allowed to give his address in a written format, which is denied. The case is held on 26 July 1999 at Leeds Crown Court, where conflicting witness testimony is given and medical evidence shows that Bunting's attacker did not sustain any injuries. Despite this, Bunting is found guilty on the common assault charge.

Bunting serves part of his sentence at HMP Armley in Leeds. He spends much of his time in his cell, reading Tony Adams's autobiography, reciting song lyrics, and practising his faith. Bunting avoids much of the prison staff and populace, speaking primarily to the prison chaplain Bill Foster and physician Steve Ferguson. In the book, Bunting asserts that his faith greatly assisted him during his time in prison.
