= Battle of Sinoia =

1966 skirmish during the Rhodesian Bush War

- Part of the Rhodesian Bush War
- Battle of Sinoia (Zimbabwe)
Date	28 April 1966
Location	Sinoia, Rhodesia 17.356619°S 30.274358°E
Result	Rhodesian victory

Belligerents
Rhodesia	ZANLA (ZANU)

Commanders and leaders
(Rhodesia) Frank Barfoot	Simon Chimbodza †

Units involved
BSAP; RRAF	Unknown

Strength
40 police 4 helicopters	7

Casualties and losses
None	7 killed

The Battle of Sinoia, also known as the Battle of Chinhoyi, was a small military engagement fought near Sinoia (modern-day Chinhoyi) between a small unit of Zimbabwe African National Liberation Army (ZANLA) guerrillas and the Rhodesian police force on 28 April 1966. The skirmish is generally considered the opening engagement of the Rhodesian Bush War (Second Chimurenga) A team of seven ZANLA cadres engaged with British South Africa Police forces near the northern town of Sinoia. The seven guerrillas all eventually died in the battle, the police killing all seven.

== Background ==
In the lead up to UDI the Rhodesian Government took country-wide measures to prevent a general nationalist uprising. The general uprising, which the nationalist leaders hoped would follow UDI failed to happen. However, inflammatory broadcasts from Zambia, Tanzania and Egypt elicited some response and there were many incidents of arson, stonings, crop slashing and mutilation of livestock. Workers particularly in Bulawayo, protested by taking part in industrial action, and at Wankie Colliery sabotage attacks were carried out by a ZAPU action group, whose leader was Mazwi Gumbo.

The conflict intensified after the Unilateral Declaration of Independence from Britain on 11 November 1965. Sanctions were implemented by the British government after UDI, and member states of the United Nations endorsed the British embargo. The embargo meant the Rhodesians were hampered by a lack of modern equipment but used other means to receive vital war supplies such as receiving oil, munitions, and arms via the government of apartheid-era South Africa. War material was also obtained through elaborate international smuggling schemes, domestic production, and equipment captured from infiltrating enemy combatants.

An earlier crossing by the guerrillas occurred early in April when another ZANU group of 14 split into three sections. One section of two men headed for the Fort Victoria area and another of five men had orders to sabotage the Beria-Umtali oil pipe-line and attack white farmers. All seven were arrested before they were able to complete their mission. The third section of seven men headed for the Midlands and it is possible that their purpose was to make contact with their President, Sithole, who was under restriction at Sikombela, near Gweru.

== Battle ==
In March 1966 four small groups of ZANLA guerillas crossed the Zambezi near Chirundu, the first nationalist incursion following UDI. One group, comprising seven men from Guruve, Hurungwe and Makonde Districts traveled to the Chinhoyi/Sinoia area, but their presence was detected by the British South Africa Police's PATU unit. Throughout the day of 28 April 1966 the two sides skirmished, and all seven ZANLA men were eventually killed, but only after their ammunition ran out. The cadres had initially planned but failed, to cut the Kariba power-line from the Kariba Dam, which was supplying 70 percent of the country's electricity, and then subsequently the cadres planned to attack the blacked-out town centre and police station at Sinoia. A notebook found on one of the bodies showed that the insurgent had been trained at Nanking military college in the previous November and December. The presence of the Rhodesian helicopter which had been effectively used as a gun-ship during the attack was an important factor in the victory over the seven guerillas.

A ZANU spokesmen abroad later claimed that the group had been responsible for killing twenty-five policemen and shooting down two helicopters, although the Rhodesian government disputed this, stating that the security forces had suffered no casualties.

As a result of the inept handling of the situation by the BSAP, the government became convinced that the BSAP were policemen and not soldiers. A shift of emphasis resulted in 1966, and the Rhodesian Security Forces became the government's primary instrument for conducting counterinsurgency operations rather than the BSAP.

The Sinoia incident also marked the official introduction of dedicated insurgent forces into Rhodesia. These insurgents were organized into small groups of 8-15 men operating from bases in Zambia. Throughout this early phase, the insurgents had two objectives: attack European owned farms and destroy the oil and powerline link between Rhodesia and the Portuguese colony of Mozambique. These initial attempts were completely unsuccessful.

Although the battle was a Rhodesian victory, the event became a source of inspiration to the nationalists: Edgar Tekere wrote in his memoirs that when news of the battle reached nationalists detained in Salisbury Maximum Security Prison, they "went wild with joy".

=== Legacy ===
The battle is celebrated in modern Zimbabwe as the first battle of the Second Chimurenga; its anniversary – also the anniversary of Nehanda Nyakasikana's execution – is marked as Chimurenga Day. The battle site was later developed into the Mashonaland West Provincial Heroes Acre and a site museum built by the National Museums and Monuments of Zimbabwe.

The battle is commemorated in the Bhundu Boys song Viva Chinhoyi, on the album Pamberi.

== See also ==
- Operations Pagoda and Yodel
- Wankie Battles
