= The Old Chisholm Trail =

American folk song

- Cover of Roy Rogers' 1961 release

Song
- Language: English
- Published: 1910
- Genre: Western, American folk
- Songwriter: Traditional

"The Old Chisholm Trail" (Roud 3438) is a cowboy song first published in 1910 by John Lomax in his book Cowboy Songs and Other Frontier Ballads.

The song dates back to the 1870s, when it was among the most popular songs sung by cowboys during that era. Based on an English lyrical song that dates back to 1640, "The Old Chisholm Trail" was modified by the cowboy idiom. It has been recorded by the several Western singers, including Harry McClintock, Gene Autry, Roy Rogers, Bing Crosby, Woody Guthrie, Randy Travis, Michael Martin Murphey, Tex Ritter, Jack Elliot, Charlie Daniels, and Riders in the Sky. Yodeling Slim Clark recorded a yodeling version in 1957 for his album Cowboy Songs. Scottish traditional folk singer Sam Shackleton has also covered the song. The song was partially covered in the now-defunct Disneyland attraction "America Sings".

Members of the Western Writers of America chose it as one of the Top 100 Western songs of all time.

In 2001, author Rosalyn Shanzer wrote a children's book based on the song. It follows the adventures of some cowboys and their cattle as they travel the Old Chisholm Trail from Texas to Kansas.

== See also ==
- Kum-A-Kye
