= Kum-A-Kye =

Rhodesian song and military march

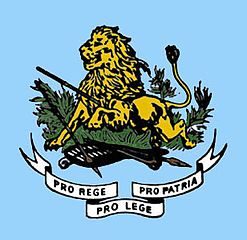
BSAP emblem

"Kum-A-Kye" or "The Kum A Kye Song" is a Rhodesian song and military march, written in 1939 by Sergeant Max Sparks, that was adopted as the regimental march of the Rhodesian British South Africa Police (BSAP) between 1947 and 1980.

== History ==
The chorus of "Kum-A-Kye" is based upon the 19th-century American campfire song " The Old Chisholm Trail", which was brought to Southern Rhodesia by two cowboys familiar with the Texan Chisholm Trail, who had joined the British South Africa Police. In 1939, the BSAP asked Sergeant Sparks to create a military band for them. Sparks did so by bringing together a number of policemen as musicians and wrote the music to "Kum-A-Kye" for the police band to play as a march.

In preparation for King George VI's royal tour of Southern Africa in 1947, "Kum-A-Kye" was formally adopted as the regimental march of the BSAP. It was predominantly played as a marching tune only, with the lyrics often not being known by the policemen in the force. In 1955 during Southern Rhodesia's time as part of the Federation of Rhodesia and Nyasaland, the BSAP released an LP album of regimental music entitled Kum-A-Kye after their regimental march. In 1980, the BSAP was disbanded and replaced by the Zimbabwe Republic Police following Rhodesia's reconstitution as Zimbabwe.

In 2011, Northern Rhodesian-born John Edmond released "Kum-A-Kye" as part of his All Time Rhodesian Evergreens album. The lyrics that he set to the tune are based upon the "Polly Wolly Doodle" American folk song.
