= Keith Coster =

Rhodesian Army general (1920–2012)

Lieutenant General Keith Robert Coster ID OBE SSAS ESM
- Born: 19 April 1920; Eshowe, Natal, Union of South Africa
- Died: 5 June 2012 (aged 92); Somerset West, South Africa
- Spouse: Molly Stanley (m. 1941, died) Millie Aherin (m. 1995)
- Military career
- Allegiance: South Africa; Rhodesia
- Branch: South African Army; Rhodesian Army
- Service years: 1937–1985
- Rank: Lieutenant General
- Awards: Independence Decoration ID Order of the British Empire OBE Star of South Africa SSAS Exemplary Service Medal ESM

Lieutenant General Keith Robert Coster (19 April 1920 – 5 June 2012) was a South African army officer who rose to command the Rhodesian Army from 1968 to 1972.

== Biography ==
Coster was born on 19 April 1920 in Eshowe, Natal, Union of South Africa. He was educated at Maritzburg College, in Pietermaritzburg, KwaZulu-Natal, South Africa. After his matriculation at the school in 1936, he enlisted in the Special Service Battalion of the Union Defence Force (UDF) (of South Africa), and was commissioned into the South African Air Force (SAAF) on 6 September 1939. While flying a Mohawk V with 5 Squadron SAAF, he was shot down over North Africa by a Luftwaffe fighter plane, a Bf 109, on 11 July 1942 and was a prisoner of war until 4 May 1945. He was sent to Stalag Luft 111 in 1942 where he was reunited with his old friend Roger Bushell (Big X) just before the camp was liberated in 1945 he helped his neighbour in the next bed Paul Brickhill to successfully hide his manuscript of The Great Escape by wrapping it round his forearm and covering it with plaster of paris.

After the war, Coster transferred to the South African Army, and during 1952 attended the Royal Army Staff College at Camberley in England. In 1955, he left the South African Permanent Force to join the Army of the Federation of Rhodesia and Nyasaland as a major.

On the dissolution of the Federation, Coster joined the Rhodesian Army, in which he rose to the rank of lieutenant-general and was appointed as general officer commanding. On 25 April 1969 he took the salute at a Rhodesian African Rifles public open day, in Bulawayo. He retired from that post in 1972 as a lieutenant-general, having commanded the Rhodesian Army from 1968 to 1972. He left for South Africa, serving as a civilian officer with the South African Defence Forces from 1981 to 1985, when he retired after forty-seven years of exemplary public service.

== Awards ==
Coster was awarded four medals for his wartime service and he became an Officer of the Order of the British Empire (OBE) in the 1964 New Year Honours. Whilst in Rhodesian service he was awarded the Independence Decoration (Rhodesia in 1965), which was awarded in 1970, and in 1971 he received the Exemplary Service Medal. Later when in South African service he was awarded in 1981 a Grand Officer of the Order of the Star of South Africa.

- Independence Decoration (ID)
- Order of the British Empire (OBE)
- Star of South Africa (Silver) (SSAS)
- Exemplary Service Medal (ESM)

== Personal life ==
Coster married Molly Stanley in 1941 and had two children, Steven and Judy, from the marriage. After the death of his first wife, he married Millie Aherin in 1995.

Coster died peacefully on 5 June 2012 in Somerset West, South Africa.
