= Operation Cauldron (Rhodesia) =

Military operation during the Rhodesian Bush War

- Part of the Rhodesian Bush War
Date	28 December 1967 – 31 May 1968
Location	Northern Mashonaland, Rhodesia
Result	Rhodesian victory

Belligerents
Rhodesia	ZIPRA; ANC (Umkhonto we Sizwe)

Commanders and leaders
(Rhodesia) Lt. Bert Sachse (Rhodesia) Lt. Chris Pearce (Rhodesia) Lt. Ron Marillier	Unknown

Units involved
Rhodesian Army; RLI; 3 Commando; RAR; BSAP; RRAF	Unknown

Strength
Unknown; 2 Canberras; 2 Vampires	126

Casualties and losses
6 killed 2 wounded	60 killed 51 arrested

Operation Cauldron was launched by the Rhodesian Security Forces in response to an incursion by ZIPRA insurgents on 28 December 1967. Despite the death or capture of 77 out of 79 men, ZAPU, from its base in the Zambian capital, Lusaka, did not regard the incursion as a failure; on the contrary, its leaders were pleased that they had inflicted some casualties on the Rhodesian African Rifles. Buoyed by what they perceived as a success, they planned another operation to take place in northern Mashonaland: about 100 men—75 ZIPRA and 25 MK—were to infiltrate the Zambezi valley and establish a series of camps, including underground caches containing food, clothing, weapons and other equipment. They were instructed to avoid the Rhodesian Security Forces "at all cost" while they recruited local tribesmen to the nationalist cause and trained them. Once a sufficient indigenous force existed, they were to inform Lusaka, which would then coordinate a mass uprising. The aim was not to defeat the government forces, but rather to force the British military to intervene. If the operation were a success, the MK men were to be escorted to South Africa to begin similar activities.

== The operation ==
The group, which consisted of 126 cadres, crossed the Zambezi around the turn of the year, with 34 cadres entering Rhodesia on 28 December 1967 and the remainder joining them on the nights of 3, 4 and 5 January 1968. The guerrillas busied themselves working their way into the country, setting up camps as they went, naming each "Camp One", "Camp Two" and so on. After two and a half months in Rhodesia the ZIPRA cadres had created five bases, each further south than the next in an almost straight line pointing due south; the fifth was about halfway between Karoi and the border and nearly due east from Makuti. They remained undetected until unfamiliar bootprints were discovered by David Scammel, a game ranger, on a well-worn path, about the width of a "four-lane highway", on 14 March 1968 around the midpoint between Camps Four and Five. On closer inspection Scammel found scraps of a sugar packet marked with Russian lettering. So began Operation Cauldron.

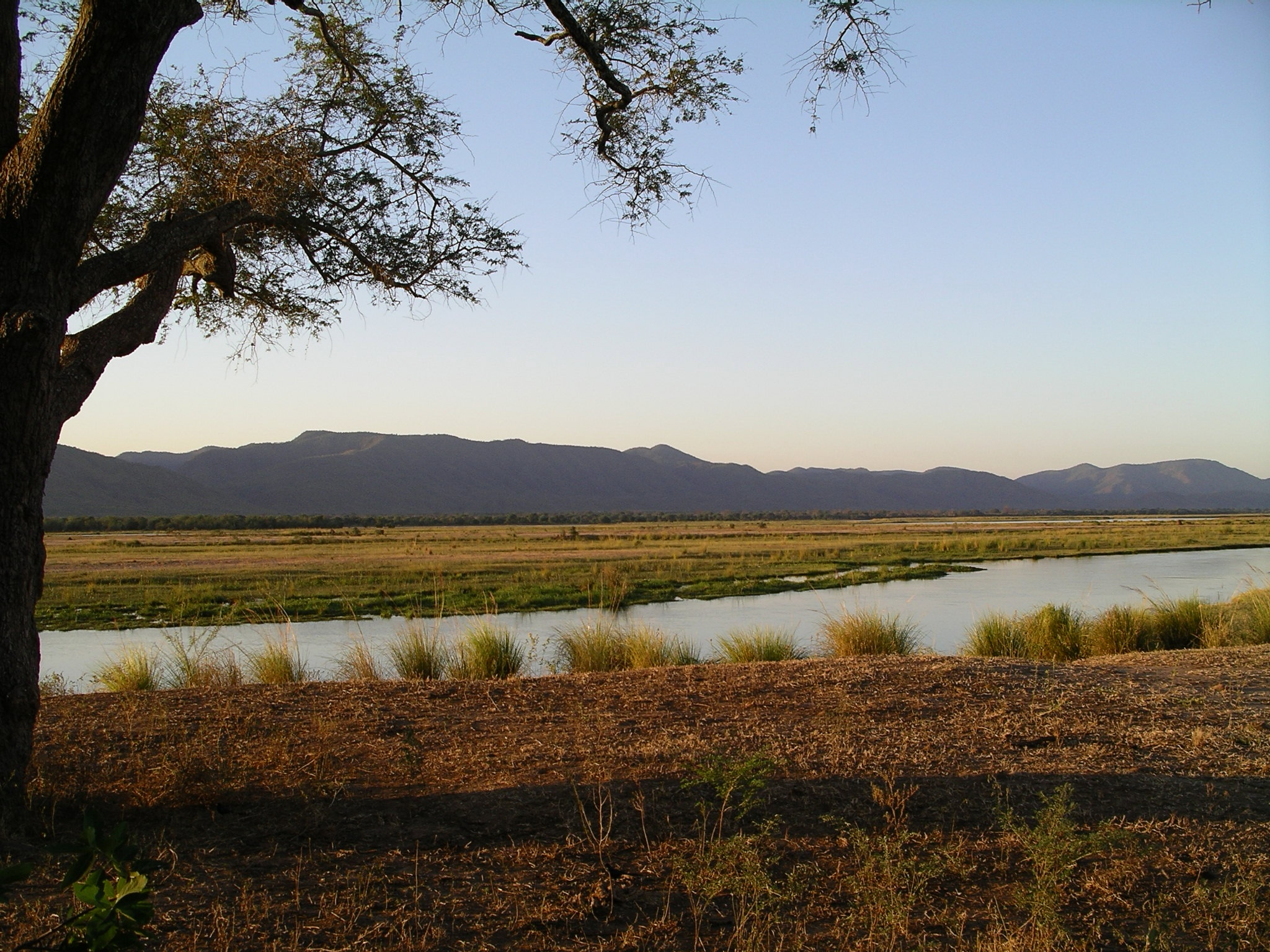
13 Troop, 3 Commando, under Lieutenant Sachse, made the first contact of Operation Cauldron on 18 March 1968 when they encountered the enemy in the Mana Pools.

"The appropriately named Cauldron," says Binda, "was to be the crucible in which the fighting character of the RLI was to be forged. ... It revealed to the world what outstanding and peerless anti-terrorist fighters the RLI were." A Joint Operations Centre (JOC) was formed on 16 March 1968 at Karoi, made up of two RAR platoons, a BSAP patrol, and 1 and 3 Commandos, RLI.

Two Vampire fighter-bombers and two Canberra bombers were detailed to circle the area and provide air strikes as needed; the mere presence of these aircraft demoralised many cadres into deserting before they even met the Rhodesian forces.

A patrol of 13 troopers from 14 Troop, 3 Commando, led by Lieutenant Bert Sachse, made first contact with the enemy on the morning of 18 March, encountering 14 nationalists near the Angwa River in the Mana Pools area. Attacking an enemy on higher ground, Sachse's men killed 10 guerrillas but lost Trooper E. N. F. Ridge to sniper fire. He was first RLI soldier to be killed by enemy action. Nevertheless, the official operational report describes the contact as "a first-rate action in which Lieutenant Sachse's leadership and the determination of his men achieved an extremely successful result."

On the same day Lieutenant Chris Pearce's 13 Troop, 3 Commando, on patrol with a platoon of Rhodesian African Rifles under Lieutenant Ron Marillier, was fired upon on the bank of the Maura River in Northern Mashonaland by about 70 ZIPRA insurgents, encamped in a strong defensive position on the side of a hill feature. "We were going on up the bank and all hell broke loose," recalled Pearce. "How we didn't take casualties I didn't quite know." Pearce's 12 men were pinned down by heavy machine-gun fire and outnumbered by around six to one. Lance-Corporal Dennis Croukamp "on his own initiative and with complete disregard for his own safety" in the words of the official report, twice crawled forward to throw grenades at the enemy position to allow the troop to redeploy into better cover. Pearce unsuccessfully attempted to assault the enemy position, then gave covering fire to an abortive flank attack by Marillier's RAR men. The security forces then attempted one final assault just before nightfall, but this also failed due to the superior numbers of ZIPRA fighters. (Note: Pearce and Croukamp were both awarded the Bronze Cross of Rhodesia on 23 October 1970 for their parts in this action.) The cadres dispersed and evacuated the area during the night and were gone when a Rhodesian sweep took place the next morning.

A series of contacts over the following days resulted in the guerrilla squads being split up and severely weakened, with the men who did not surrender or desert being killed or arrested; on 21 March, the insurgent commanders in Lusaka realised that their men had been detected and ordered the only remaining intact team, made up of 26 men, to return to Zambia. An assault on an enemy camp near Sipolilo on 26 March by 21 men from RLI Training Troop resulted in the deaths of two Troopers, R. A. Binks and G. D. Wessels. (Note: These 21 men had been due to pass out two weeks later but had been brought through early to assist in the operation.) By 27 March, 28 cadres had been killed and 15 captured; by 3 April, the figures stood at 36 dead and 24 in custody. Five more were arrested on 4 April and one shot dead by men from 1 Troop, 1 Commando, south of Makuti. "It now appeared obvious," says Binda, "that the insurgents had scattered and were on the run." On 9 April, the last contact with any significant number of guerrillas involved took place north of Karoi. A police unit and 4 Troop, 1 Commando encountered a group of insurgents and killed all seven, but lost Trooper M. E. Thornley to a fatal chest wound.

== Aftermath ==
When Operation Cauldron was closed on 31 May 1968, 58 of the 126 fighters who had crossed from Zambia had been confirmed killed and 51 had been captured. Of the 17 outstanding, nine had returned to Zambia, leaving eight unaccounted for.

Having acquitted themselves well during the operation, the young RLI troopers, many still teenagers, earned high praise from Platoon Warrant Officer Herod of the RAR, who had been wounded fighting alongside them on the Maura on 18 March 1968. "We of the RAR used to laugh at your soldiers," Herod said to RLI Sergeant Tim Baker, who was visiting him in hospital. "To us they looked like boys. But they showed us how to fight. They have the faces of boys, but they fight like lions."
