= Makuti =

Village in Zimbabwe

Coordinates: 16°18′S 29°15′E

Makuti is a small village in Mashonaland West province, Zimbabwe. It lies on the A1 road between Harare and Chirundu border post. All traffic for Kariba turns off the Harare-Chirundu road at Makuti. The roadway between Makuti and Chirundu has been expanded with funding from the Japanese government. The village is surrounded by wildlife/safari areas, including the Hurungwe Safari Area.

Makuti has a petrol station, a hotel, and a shop. The hotel's name is Clouds End, and it provides a scenic view of the Zimbabwean bush towards Lake Kariba. The name Makuti means "wet mist" or "persistent drizzle".
