= Police Support Unit =

Paramilitary wing of the Zimbabwe Republic Police

- The Police Support Unit's patch under the British South Africa Police of Rhodesia.
- Active: 1898 - present
- Country: Zimbabwe
- Agency: Zimbabwe Republic Police
- Type: Paramilitary
- Common name: Black Boots
- Abbreviation: PSU

Notables
- Significant operation(s): Rhodesian Bush War

The Police Support Unit, also known by their nickname of the Black Boots, is a paramilitary wing of the Zimbabwe Republic Police. They were founded as a native police force but later developed into a counter-insurgency unit of the British South Africa Police in Rhodesia during the Rhodesian Bush War. The unit was the only paramilitary unit retained by the Zimbabwe Republic Police after the country's reconstitution as Zimbabwe.

The unit gained notoriety for being an effective counter-terrorist force but received criticism in the latter stages of the Bush War as well as under Zimbabwean control for utilising brutal tactics against their targets.

== Rhodesian history ==
The Police Support Unit had its origins in 1898 when 150 Ngoni tribesmen were recruited by the British South Africa Company as auxiliary native police to the British South Africa Police in Company-ruled Rhodesia. For most of their existence, they were mostly relegated to ceremonial duties, leading to them being given the derogatory nickname of the "Chocolate Soldiers" by the white policemen. It was suggested in 1963 by the British South Africa Police (BSAP) commissioner following the breakup of the Federation of Rhodesia and Nyasaland that the Police Support Unit should be expanded to take on the role of the Rhodesian Army in Southern Rhodesia. But this suggestion was rejected by the Southern Rhodesian government. However, when the Rhodesian Bush War started, the Support Unit took on a more active anti-terrorist role.

The Police Support Unit became known as the Black Boots for the boots they wore in contrast to the brown boots the rest of the BSAP wore. During the first few years of the Bush War, the active Black Boots operations were composed of mercenary soldiers, predominantly white mercenaries from the Congo Crisis. However, the unit's operations would eventually evolve to include native black police officers who received military training in addition to their regular police training. By the late 1970s, the unit was majority black with most being veterans of the Malayan Emergency. The white commanders in the unit were hand-selected from the regular Duty Uniform Branch of the BSAP. Foreign volunteers, mostly American veterans of the Vietnam War, would also be admitted to the unit providing they passed security clearance.

The Black Boots were highly regarded due to their high levels of military training and behaved more like an army unit than part of the police force. They became known as the BSAP's "mailed fist" because they operated similarly to the Selous Scouts and trained at the Rhodesian School of Infantry. Black policemen were attracted to join the Black Boots because of the improved pay and living conditions as well as being able to access a higher standard of education.

The Black Boots would gain a tough reputation in the latter years of the Bush War with the Rhodesian Sunday Mail accusing them of being "terr hungry" for their apparent enjoyment of killing suspected terrorists. They were accused of being responsible for the killing of 50 black civilians in 1978 which the Rhodesian government had claimed was targeting guerrillas.

== Zimbabwean history ==
Following the establishment of Zimbabwe, the BSAP were disbanded and refounded as the Zimbabwe Republic Police and the Police Support Unit was retained. They were the only paramilitary section of the former BSAP that were retained under the new police force. Under Zimbabwean control, they were integrated with the Zimbabwe Defence Forces and were initially used to target Zimbabwe People's Revolutionary Army (ZIPRA) guerrillas in 1980. Until 1982 they were mostly based in Salisbury (later renamed Harare in 1982). From 1982, they started being used on border patrols looking for South African smugglers. In the mid 1980s, the Prime Minister of Zimbabwe Robert Mugabe announced that he would be integrating Zimbabwe African National Liberation Army (ZANLA) guerrillas who fought in the Bush War with the Black Boots over concerns by the police that it would dilute the quality of the force.

They were used as an external military force in the Second Congo War when they were deployed to fight against the Rwandan-backed rebels. The Black Boots were also accused of taking part in extrajudicial political intimidation campaigns alongside members of the ruling ZANU-PF to attack supporters of the Movement for Democratic Change – Tsvangirai. This also included the alleged use of corporal punishment and electric shock torture. In 2016, it was reported members of the unit had been ambushed by RENAMO rebels whilst on patrol of the border with Mozambique, where three members of the Black Boots were abducted and had their weapons and identity papers stolen. During the 2017 Zimbabwean coup d'etat, the Zimbabwe National Army seized control of the PSU's depot in Harare and disarmed all police officers during the coup. In 2021, the Black Boots were involved in a court case involving them trying to evict a man from his farm because they wanted the eastern part that he held.

Since 1991, the Black Boots have competed as a volleyball team. In 2017, the Support Unit team won the Confederation of African Volleyball Zone VI Championship.
