= Villagization =

Resettlement of people into designated villages by government or military authorities

Villagization (or -isation) is the usually compulsory resettlement of people into designated villages by government or military authorities.

== Security ==
Villagization may be used as a tactic by a government or military power to facilitate control over a previously scattered rural population believed to harbour disloyal or rebel elements. Examples include Indian removal to reservations by the U.S. government, General Order No. 11 (1863) in the American Civil War, the British New Villages program to defeat communist insurgents during the Malayan Emergency, the U.S. "Strategic Hamlet Program" in the Vietnam War and the "protected villages" strategy adopted by Rhodesia, Mozambique, and Uganda in combating modern insurgencies.

The British authorities in Colonial Kenya used a similar approach to exert control over Kikuyu tribespeople during the Mau Mau Uprising, which in turn inspired the "Manyatta" strategy of independent Kenya against ethnic Somalis during the Shifta War. However, forced resettlement may sometimes be counter-productive where it increases resentment among an already restive population against the ruling regime.

== Economic ==
Villagization may also be used as part of a program of collectivization of farming and other economic activity, as in Tanzania under the Ujamaa policy set out in the Arusha Declaration, and in Ethiopia, particularly under Mengistu's administration.

== See also ==
- Reductions - villagization by Spain in Latin America, the Philippines, and the Mariana Islands
- Villagization (Ethiopia)
