= British South Africa Police =

Police force of the Southern Rhodesia and the Republic of Rhodesia

- Emblem of the British South Africa Police
- Active: 1889 – 31 July 1980; (superseded by Zimbabwe Republic Police)
- Country: Rhodesia
- Allegiance: British South Africa Company (1889–1923); Southern Rhodesia (1923–65); Rhodesia (1965–70); Republic of Rhodesia (1970–79); Zimbabwe Rhodesia (1979); (United Kingdom) Southern Rhodesia (1979–80); Zimbabwe (1980)
- Branch: Police
- Type: Police
- Mottos: Latin: Pro rege, pro lege, pro patria For King, For Law, For Country
- Colours: Blue & Old Gold
- March: Kum-A-Kye
- Engagements: First Matabele War; Second Matabele War; Second Boer War; First World War – Tanganyika; Second World War; Rhodesian Bush War
- Website: https://www.bsapolice.org/

The British South Africa Police (BSAP) was, for most of its existence, the police force of Southern Rhodesia and Rhodesia (now modern day Zimbabwe, since 1980). It was formed as a paramilitary force of mounted infantrymen in 1889 by Cecil Rhodes' British South Africa Company, from which it took its original name, the British South Africa Company's Police. Initially run directly by the company, it began to operate independently in 1896, at which time it also dropped "Company's" from its name. It thereafter served as Rhodesia's regular police force, retaining its name, until 1980, when it was superseded by the Zimbabwe Republic Police, soon after the country's reconstitution into Zimbabwe in April that year.

While it was in the main a law enforcement organisation, the line between police and military was significantly blurred. BSAP officers trained both as policemen and regular soldiers until 1954. BSAP men served in the latter role during the First and Second World Wars, and also provided several support units to the Rhodesian Bush War of the 1960s and 1970s.

During the Bush War, the BSAP operated several anti-guerrilla units, most prominently the Police Anti-Terrorist Unit, which tracked and engaged Communist guerrillas; the Support Unit, which was a police field force, nicknamed the "Black Boots" because of the colour of their footwear; and the Civilian African Tracking Unit, composed mostly of black Rhodesian trackers using traditional skills.

By 1980, the BSAP comprised about 46,000 personnel; 11,000 professionals (about 60% black), and the remainder reservists (mostly white). The organisation's rank structure was unique, with different levels of seniority existing for black and white officers respectively. Until 1976, black officers could rise no further than sub-inspector, while the commissioned ranks were all-white. Limitations on black aspirations were removed in 1976. The first promotion of African members to previously European-only ranks occurred on 21 October 1976 with 23 Sub-Inspectors and 8 Detective Sub-Inspectors, a week later, being promoted to Patrol Officers.

== History ==
=== Under the British South Africa Company ===
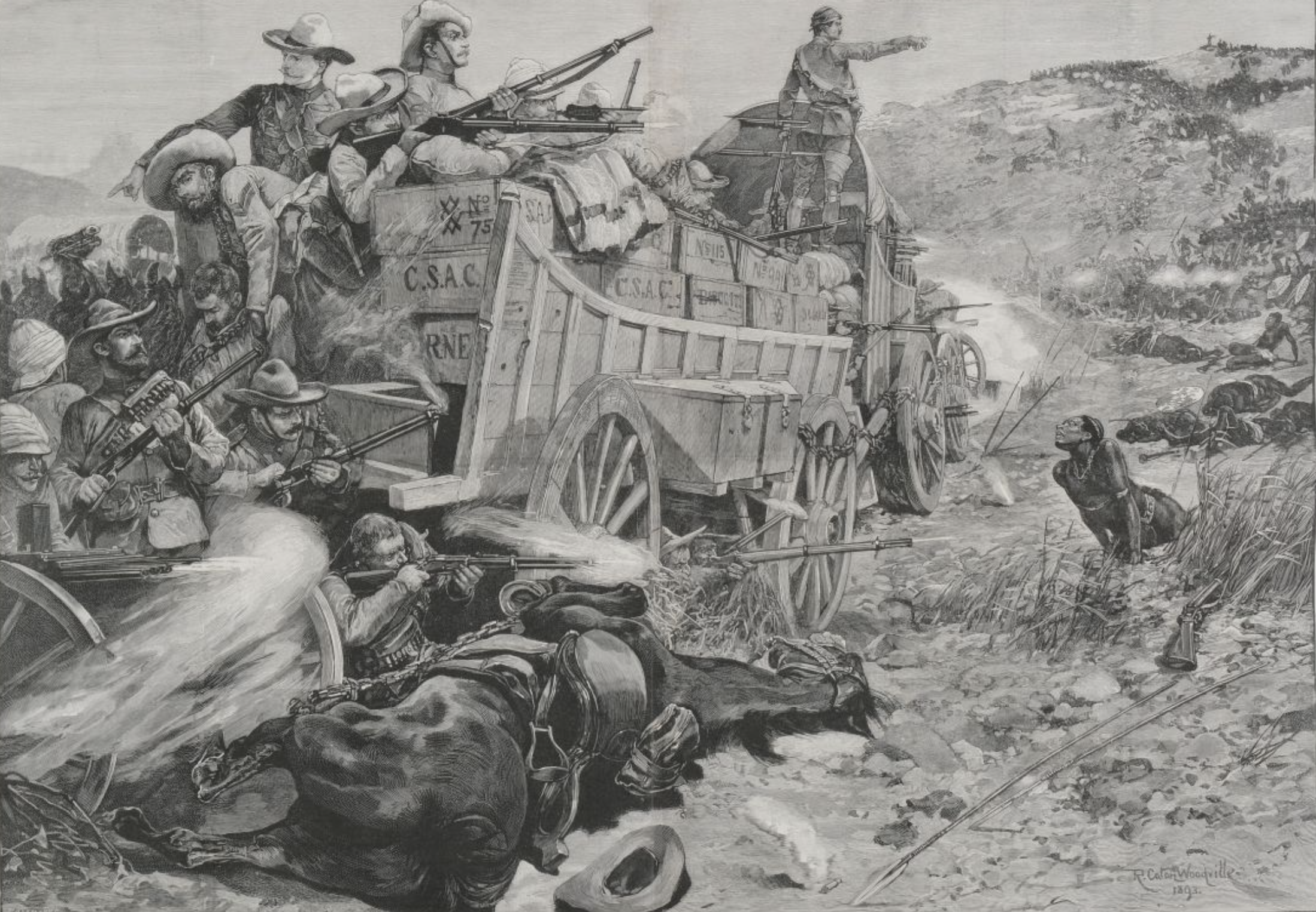
1893 illustration of the Battle of the Shangani by Richard Caton Woodville Jr.

The organisation was formed by the BSAC in 1889 as a paramilitary, mounted infantry force in order to provide protection for the Pioneer Column of settlers which moved into Mashonaland in 1890. In common with several colonial police forces such as the Royal Canadian Mounted Police (RCMP), it was modelled on the Royal Irish Constabulary (RIC), and its early officers were trained at the Police Depot in the Phoenix Park in Dublin. The unit played a central role in both the First Matabele War (1893) and the Second Matabele War (1896/97) with many troopers serving in the Jameson Raid. Until 1896 the force was called the British South Africa Company's Police.

The BSAP operated originally in conjunction with the Southern Rhodesia Constabulary (SRC), the town police force for Salisbury (now Harare) and Bulawayo, but amalgamated with the SRC in 1909.

=== First and Second World Wars ===
Officer's cap badge of the BSAP, c. 1965, showing the "wounded lion" device.

As a paramilitary unit, the BSAP fought in the Second Boer War and in German East Africa during the First World War, while some members were seconded to the Rhodesia Native Regiment. From 1923, Southern Rhodesia was a self-governing colony of the British Empire, but the BSAP retained its title and its position as the senior regiment of the Southern Rhodesian armed forces.

One of the first casualties of the BSAP in the Second World War was Keppel Bagot Levett, born in 1919, who died in active service with the BSAP in March 1941.

Between the World Wars, the Permanent Staff Corps of the Rhodesian Army consisted of only 47 men. The BSAP were trained as both policemen and soldiers until 1954.

=== The Rhodesian Bush War ===
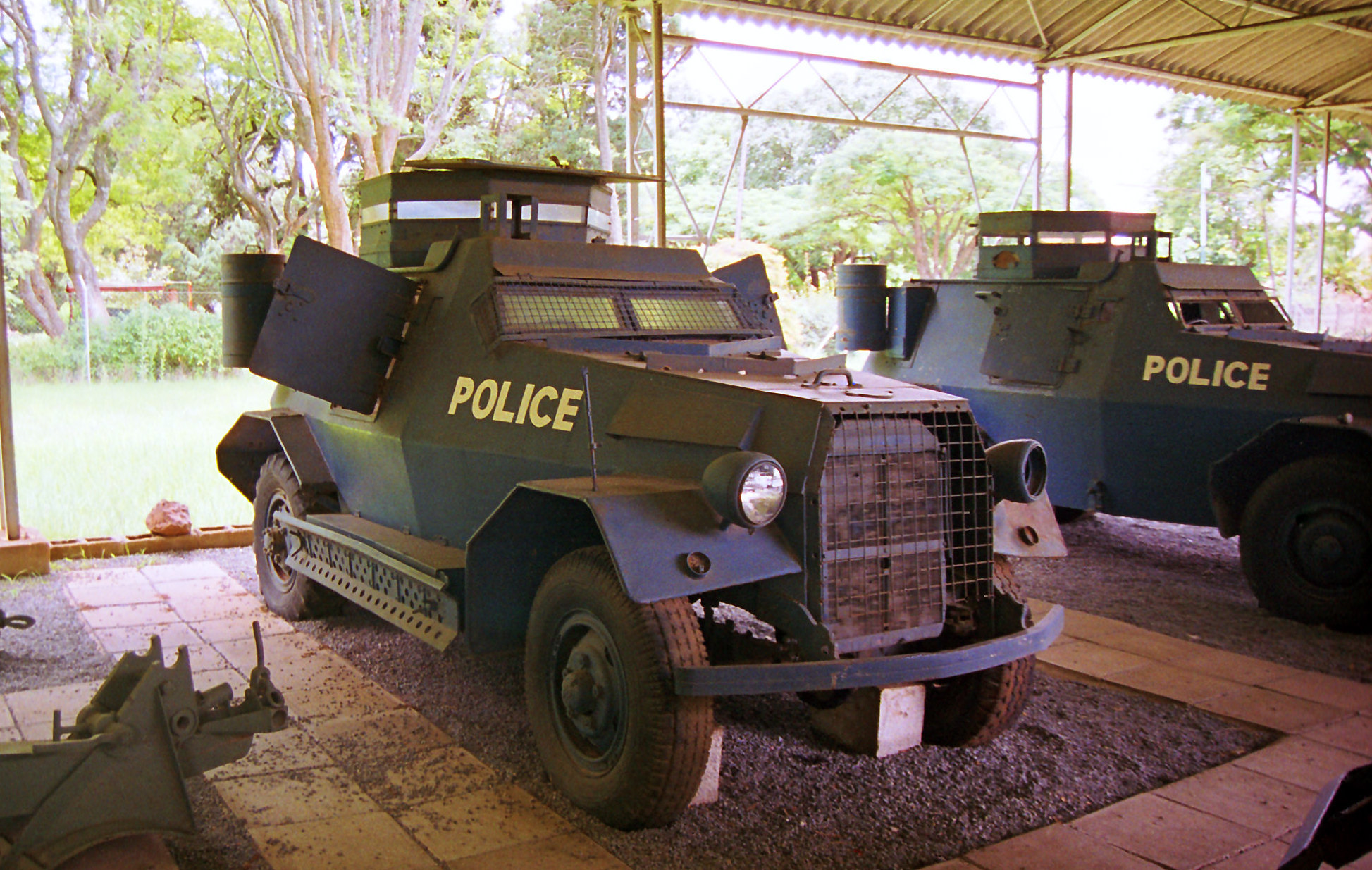
Marmon-Herrington armoured cars of the BSAP Reserve.

During the period of the Rhodesian Bush War in the late 1960s and 1970s, the BSAP formed an important part of the white minority government's fight against Communist guerrillas. The force formed a riot unit; a tracker combat team (later renamed the Police Anti-Terrorist Unit or PATU); a police field force, Police Support Unit, (who were distinguished by wearing black boots), an Urban Emergency Unit, a Police Reserve Air Wing or PRAW, and a Marine Division. Many of its white personnel were national servicemen and conscripted reservists. At independence, the force had a strength of approximately 11,000 regulars (about 60% black) and almost 35,000 reservists, of whom the overwhelming majority were white. A former BSAP officer, Daniel Carney, wrote a book titled Whispering Death about the BSAP in anti-terrorist operations which was later made into the film Albino.

=== After independence ===
The BSAP's name remained unchanged by the Unilateral Declaration of Independence, although following the declaration of a republic by Ian Smith's government in 1970, the St Edward's Crown was removed from the BSAP's badge, and the appointment of Queen Elizabeth the Queen Mother as Honorary Commissioner was suspended. In place of St. Edward's Crown, the Zimbabwe Bird was displayed on cap badges.

=== Renaming ===
The British South Africa Police was renamed the Zimbabwe Republic Police in July 1980 following the installation of Robert Mugabe as Prime Minister of Zimbabwe.

== Capabilities and departments ==
A Criminal Investigation Department (CID) was founded in 1923; a Women's Section in 1941, and a Dog Unit in 1945. From 1957, the Police Reserve also had an airborne wing.

Prior to the use of motor vehicles, extended rural patrols were carried out on horseback, and right up until the Force was renamed all white male officers were taught equitation as part of their basic traíning. Selected officers were retained in Morris Depot after "passing out" and tasked with training remount horses for future use by recruits and on ceremonial duties. Mounted Escorts were provided for occasions such as the State Opening of Parliament. Generally speaking, the force was the 'Senior Service' and performed ceremonials such as those allocated to the RCMP today. As such, discipline, presentation, and parade drill were of a very high standard.

The Support Unit (known as the "Black Boots" due to their footwear) was a Police field force staffed by about 50 white and 1700 (as of 1980) black regular and national servicemen.

In the late 1970s a Civilian African Tracking Unit (C.A.T.U.) was added, to relieve the professional trackers in the pursuing of the enemy infiltrators into Rhodesia. Their tracking methods were based on the traditional skills and techniques of the Rhodesian Shangaan tribe. Their formations were called 'sticks', and consisted of a couple of white Rhodesian 'Patrol Officers', or 'Section Officers', and six to eight black Rhodesian trackers. Police Reservists and regular police officers organised in a similar way were called the Police Anti Terrorist Unit or PATU.

Police of all ranks to chief inspector, were obliged to perform PATU secondment on a regular rotation basis, and deployed to operational areas. Riot standby units were also maintained to deal with urban civil disorder on the same basis. Counter insurgency and advanced weapons training were mandatory by the 1970s in anticipation of PATU and district duties.

The BSAP also oversaw the intelligence collection function of the Selous Scouts. That function was performed by an embedded element of the BSAP's Special Branch (SB), commanded by Chief Superintendent Michael "Mac" McGuinness; the SB liaison team conducted interrogations of captured guerrillas, reviewed captured documents, and collated and disseminated intelligence. The SB team also oversaw the production and insertion of poisoned clothing, food, beverages, and medicines into the guerrilla supply chain. The use of contaminated supplies resulted in the reported deaths of over 800 guerrillas, and the likely death toll probably reached well over 1,000.

== Rank structure ==
Until late 1976, black Rhodesians could not hold ranks higher than Sub-Inspector in the BSAP, only white Rhodesians could gain commissioned rank. After moderate black leader Bishop Abel Muzorewa was elected in the 1979 elections the promotion of African members hastened. After Robert Mugabe took power, the force followed a racial policy of "Africanisation", in which senior white officers were forcibly retired and their positions filled by black officers.

The rank structure was unique; black policemen (known colloquially as "Mapolisa") were Constables, Sergeants, Senior Sergeants, Sergeant Majors, and Sub Inspectors.

The white police (known colloquially as 'Majoni') ranks began at Patrol Officer (single gold bar on each shoulder), proceeding to Senior Patrol Officer (two gold bars), Section Officer (three gold bars), and thereafter to Inspector, Chief Inspector and commissioned ranks, etc., as per UK police rank structures. From 1977 Inspector and Chief Inspector became commissioned ranks to better align the Police ranks with those of the rest of the Security Forces. Lance and Staff rank prefixes were also used were appropriate in a similar manner to most Commonwealth armed forces.

Members serving under CID had the prefix 'Detective' to their rank e.g. Detective Section Officer, abbreviated to D/SO. The prefix was dropped once a member attained the rank of Superintendent.

White officers were assigned separate mess facilities to the black police and were obliged to employ black 'batmen'. The batmen were skilled at presenting and maintaining several police uniform 'dress orders' worn throughout any given day, all of which were expected to be immaculate at all times.

The responsibilities of these Caucasian police officers, once trained, were broadly the same as those of UK police officers. Black officers engaged in operational police work worked alongside their white colleagues on investigations and patrols, necessarily acting as interpreters with the indigenous population, as well as patrolling alone and conducting their own crime investigations or as otherwise directed. Black "ground coverage" officers acted as undercover plainclothes intelligence gatherers in both rural and urban areas.

A district (rural) police station with a strength of anything from a dozen to forty personnel was often required to 'fly the flag' over an area comprising several hundred sq. kilometres.

On 18 December 1978, Equitation Squad 14/78–the first multi-racial recruit squad-began training at Morris Depot in Salisbury (now Harare). Prior to this date, Black recruits were trained at Tomlinson Depot, while White officers were trained at Morris Depot. Included in this historic intake was Patrol Officer Sinclair Roberts, the first mixed-race Police Officer accepted to the Force, 89 years after it was founded.

=== Ranks ===
Commissioned officers
Commissioner	Deputy Commissioner	Senior Assistant Commissioner	Assistant Commissioner	Chief Superintendent	Superintendent	Chief Inspector	Inspector

Ranks for European police			Ranks for African police			
Non-commissioned officers						Constables
Section Officer	Senior Patrol Officer	Patrol Officer	Sergeant Major	Senior Sergeant	Sergeant	Constable

== Commissioners ==
The following is a list of commissioners of the British South Africa Police from the force's amalgamation in 1909 until its dissolution in 1980.

- Lt. Col. J. H. Fuller (18 April 1909 – 1 April 1911)
- Maj. Gordon Vallancy Drury (1 April 1911 – 28 January 1913)
- Maj. Gen. Sir Alfred Hamilton Mackenzie Edwards (28 January 1913 – 23 January 1923)
- Col. Algernon Essex Capell (1 February 1923 – 11 February 1926)
- Alfred James Tomlinson (12 February 1926 – 12 May 1926; acting)
- Col. George Stops (13 May 1926 – 14 February 1933)
- Brig. John Sidney Morris (15 February 1933 – 24 April 1945)
- Brig. John Ellis "Jack" Ross (24 April 1945 – 6 December 1950)
- Col. James Appleby (7 December 1950 – 2 June 1954)
- Col. Arthur Selwyn Hickman (3 June 1954 – 5 November 1955)
- Col. Harold Jackson (6 November 1955 – 12 March 1958)
- Basil Gordon Spurling (13 March 1958 – 25 April 1963)
- Frank Eric Barfoot (26 April 1963 – 2 January 1968)
- James Spink (3 January 1968 – 26 June 1970)
- Sydney Frederick Samuel Bristow (27 June 1970 – 6 February 1974)
- Peter Dennis Wray Richard Sherren (7 February 1974 – 6 February 1978)
- Peter Kevin Allum (7 February 1978 – 6 February 1982)

== Flags and emblems ==
- Not done

BSAP flag used from 1970-1980

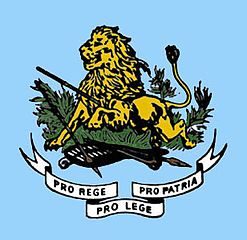
Emblem used by the BSAP used from 1960 to 1980

== Selection and training ==
From early 1978 to 1980, support, training, and selection consisted of 3 phases, culminating latterly in 6 months/24 weeks training, with the first phase lasting as long as 11 weeks (the RLI's first phase was 6 weeks). Emphasis in selection depended on extreme physical fitness and aggression (running at an excess of 120 kilometres per week), mental strength in decision making and problem solving under extreme duress. The selection course consisted of a junior leader assessment in all areas concerning leadership. All Counter Operations Insurgency (COIN) battle drills were held in battle camps at Concession and Shamva. The pass rate among recruits amounted to only 30%. On passing out, recruits were deployed to one of 13 and latterly 14 troops (Troop company strength being 120 men; Mantle Mounted and November Troop being new additions in 1981). The Support Unit supported the Police in rural problem areas (latterly dissidents), as well as in urban emergencies. In November 1980, during the Entumbani I uprising, two sections of 60 men each from 5 Support Unit Troops (Mantle Echo, Mantle Charlie, Mantle Juliet, Mantle Hotel, Mantle Lima, 300 men in all), travelled from all over Zimbabwe to reach Bulawayo in 11 hours. Due to the Support Unit Troops being independent with their own vehicles, stores, ammunition, medical supplies, tents etc., they could deploy anywhere at a moment's notice all over Zimbabwe. During the Bush War, the Support Unit's primary task was to patrol the long distances in the Tribal Trust Lands and to maintain and reinstate order in the kraals (native villages).
