= History of the Rhodesian Light Infantry (1972–1977) =

Late history of the Rhodesian Light Infantry

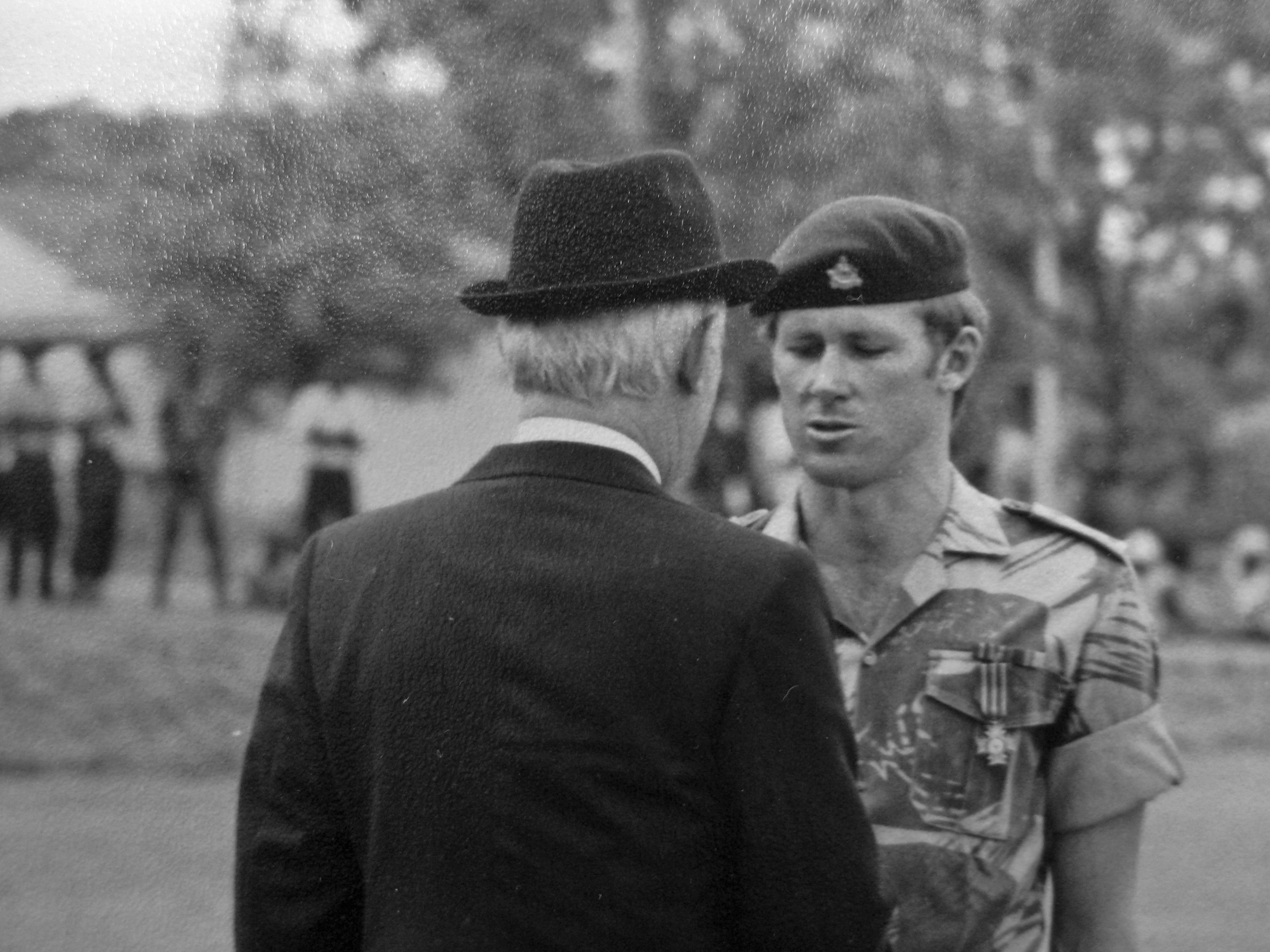
Acting Lieutenant Nigel John Theron of 2 Commando, Rhodesian Light Infantry received the Bronze Cross of Rhodesia from President John Wrathall on 15 October 1976, having displayed "gallantry and leadership in action" in several contacts with guerrillas on Operation Hurricane. (Note: On two occasions, Theron was wounded but refused to be evacuated until the area was secure. On another, he guided his men to an insurgent base camp with such stealth that he was able to catch the two dozen cadres by surprise and kill four of them himself. After the survivors fled, Theron's RLI men pursued them throughout the evening, then overnight, and destroyed the remainder of the opposing force, killing 16 and capturing one. There were no Rhodesian losses.)

The 1st Battalion, The Rhodesian Light Infantry, commonly the Rhodesian Light Infantry (1RLI or RLI), served in the Rhodesian Bush War as part of the Rhodesian Security Forces between 1964 and 1979, under the unrecognised government of Rhodesia following its 1965 Unilateral Declaration of Independence from Britain. During the second half of 1979 it fought for Zimbabwe Rhodesia, a black majority-ruled version of the same state which also failed to win international recognition. After an interim period under British control from December 1979 to April 1980, the RLI briefly remained active within the armed forces of Zimbabwe, but did not see action under this government. It disbanded on 31 October 1980.

The Bush War involved counter-insurgency operations by the Rhodesian Security Forces against two rival guerrilla armies, the Zimbabwe African National Liberation Army (ZANLA) attached to the Zimbabwe African National Union (ZANU), and the military wing of the Zimbabwe African People's Union (ZAPU), the Zimbabwe People's Revolutionary Army (ZIPRA). Following its reorganisation as a specialised commando unit starting in late 1964, the RLI played a major role in the war during its early phase, effectively countering ZANLA and ZIPRA incursions.

After ZANLA spent 1971 and 1972 covertly subverting the local black population of north-eastern Rhodesia to their side in the Maoist fashion, it attacked two white farms near the north-eastern village of Centenary in December 1972. The RLI was one of the first units despatched to counter the infiltration, and Operation Hurricane, a major counter-insurgency action, was started in the country's north-east soon after. Hurricane would last for the rest of the war, eventually just one of seven operational areas defined across Rhodesia by the security forces—Operations Thrasher, Repulse and Tangent followed in 1976, Grapple began a year later and Splinter, covering Lake Kariba, started in 1978. SALOPS ("Salisbury Operations") covered the Rhodesian capital.

Fireforce, a vertical envelopment tactic based around the use of helicopter-borne troops, was first executed by the RLI in early 1974 and soon became the main action of the Regiment. The quick reaction time made possible by the Fireforce, combined with the observational capacity of the new Selous Scouts deep cover reconnaissance unit, helped the security forces to counter ZANLA's new Maoist tactics. After the Rhodesians won back considerable ground, a South African-brokered ceasefire in December 1974 allowed the nationalists to regroup; the independence of Mozambique under a communist government in 1975 also assisted the guerrillas. Two abortive rounds of talks took place across Victoria Falls in August 1975 and Geneva, Switzerland between October and December 1976. While the latter conference was going on, the RLI played a key role in one of the security forces' biggest victories in the war thus far, at "Hill 31" in the Honde Valley on 15 November 1976.

During this period the RLI reinforced the reputation it had carved for itself during the 1960s; on 25 July 1975 it received the Freedom of the City of Salisbury. Its successful execution of the new Fireforce procedure from 1974 leads Chris Cocks to describe the RLI of 1976 as a "crack unit". The official Fireforce doctrine published by the security forces names the "well-trained" RLI and Rhodesian African Rifles as the only two suitable regiments. The Rhodesia Herald's defence reporter, Chris Reynolds, described the Battalion's performance in the Battle of "Hill 31" as "spectacular". Many individual RLI soldiers won official recognition for their combat actions between 1972 and 1977, with 14 gaining operational commendations and 10 winning the Bronze Cross of Rhodesia. One, Sergeant Peter NcNeilage, won the Silver Cross of Rhodesia on 13 September 1974, having displayed "personal courage, example and outstanding leadership, without concern for his own safety" during Operation Hurricane. (Note: McNeilage's official commendation says that during counter-insurgency operations in the north-east he "almost continually" led his men, part of 1 Commando, into battle, with "calm, confident and aggressive leadership and personal bravery". Over the course of numerous successful engagements with ZANLA cadres, McNeilage's personal tactical acumen enabled his men to kill or capture each guerrilla force they faced and recover large quantities of intelligence and matériel from them. Shortly before receiving the Silver Cross, he played a large part in a successful Fireforce attack in which the security forces killed 13 guerrillas without loss. The commendation concludes by saying that McNeilage had been an "inspiration" to the rest of the unit.)

== The conflict winds up again ==
=== ZANLA gathers its strength ===
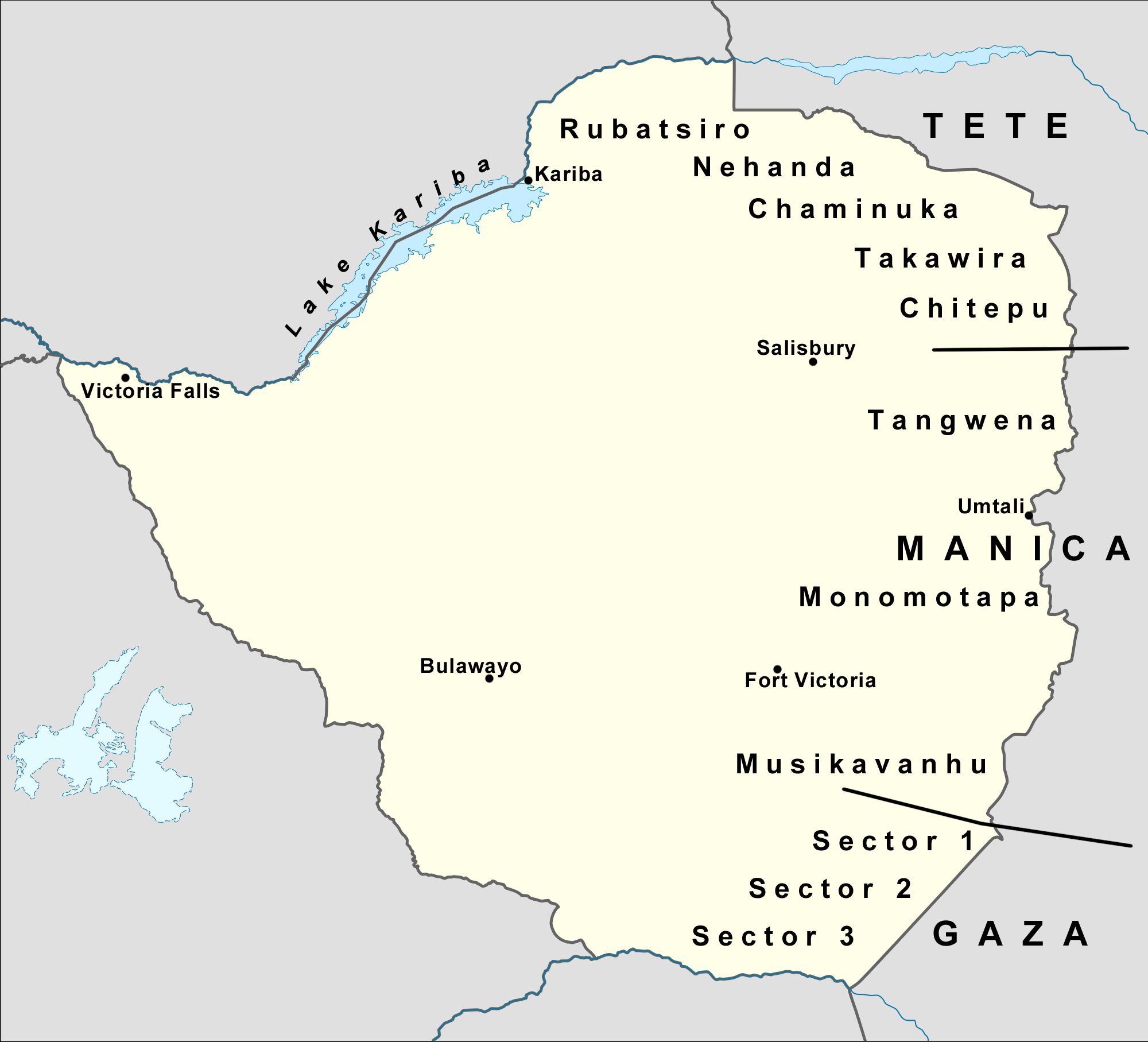
The "provinces" and sectors defined by the ZANLA leadership. The "province" names, Tete, Manica and Gaza, correspond to the neighbouring Mozambican provinces in which local ZANLA commanders were based. The sectors (apart from those in Gaza "province") were named for tribal spirits, places and leaders of the Shona people.

The Zimbabwe African National Liberation Army (ZANLA) reorganised itself thoroughly during 1971 and 1972 with the help of the Liberation Front of Mozambique (FRELIMO), which had won numerous victories against Portuguese security forces south of the Zambezi and was now in a more viable position to assist. FRELIMO leader Samora Machel provided logistical support to ZANLA, and offered the same to the Zimbabwe People's Revolutionary Army (ZIPRA), but ZIPRA leader Joshua Nkomo refused. "ZANLA made careful preparation for their coming campaign," writes Wood: "politicising the rural people in their Maoist fashion, establishing local committees, contact men, feeders, security procedures, and infiltration and exit routes."

The ZANLA commanders split Rhodesia into several "provinces", each of which was referred to by the name of the adjacent Mozambican province, and marked out tactical sectors which they named after tribal leaders, spirits and places. The basic unit of the ZANLA forces was a section of 10 to 12 men, which included a political commissar tasked with establishing base camps at regular intervals as the squad moved. The follow-up units of 20 to 30 men would assemble in Mozambique and infiltrate once the subverted area in question had been prepared, with base camps ready and local contact men waiting. "In order not to frighten recruits," Wood goes on, "Rhodesian firepower was not mentioned. Thus a first contact could be traumatic to the new cadres and contributed to their poor performance in fire fights."

=== Operation Sable ===
The RLI underwent extensive training during 1972, running a classical war exercise from March to April and then coordinating a larger-scale exercise of the same nature with the Rhodesia Regiment for two months starting in June. Two weeks of counter-insurgency training followed, starting in early September 1972. This proved appropriate for what was to come immediately after: Operation Sable, the RLI's first battalion-size operation in Mozambique, which began in late September. Sable followed on from a Rhodesian Special Air Service (SAS) action in the same area against several local FRELIMO base camps, which were fighting the Portuguese Armed Forces and at the same time assisting ZANLA. The plan called for 2 and 3 Commandos and Support Group, RLI to march due north from where the Ruya River met the border with Rhodesia and set up a stop line about 30 kilometres (19 mi) in. After this 1 Commando would be deployed to the east and sweep in towards the line.

The RLI troops entered Mozambique led by Major Rod Tarr, officer commanding of 3 Commando, and moved by night, resting during the day. The terrain, littered with hidden gullies and patches of thick bush, slowed the advance down considerably, as did the loss of Tarr on the first day. "During the first day's lay-up Rod Tarr somehow got boiling water in his boot and had to be casevaced," writes Ian Buttenshaw, then an RLI lieutenant. "The second night was just as bad ..." Although the RLI did not contact any insurgents during its advance, several deserted, but well-established camps were discovered. The Battalion found many more such bases during September and October but all were vacant, the cadres having become aware of the RLI presence and pulled out of the area. The RLI was ultimately withdrawn from Mozambique without having encountered any guerrillas, and the operation was abandoned. Buttenshaw continues: "Although no kills were achieved, a lot of valuable lessons were learned, which would eventually be of use when planning future 'externals'. The major effect of the operation was that it certainly delayed the terr incursions and build-up in the area east of the Ruya River."

== Chimurenga: the Bush War begins in earnest ==
=== ZANLA attacks Altena and Whistlefield Farms ===
The revolutionary drive to eliminate settler oppression, imperialism and capitalism, the achievement of independence and freedom in Zimbabwe is gaining ground. The balance of power is shifting in favour of revolutionary forces. Each day the forces of liberation and progress are gaining strength and experience while the forces of fascism meet setback after setback and resort to naked mass murder, terror, destruction of villages, crops, property and animals of innocent people.

— The opening paragraph of a typical ZANU "chimurenga war communiqué", (Note: Chimurenga is a Shona word meaning "revolutionary struggle".) Number 8, issued from Lusaka on 27 March 1974

Rhodesian intelligence, which had been monitoring ZANLA's activity and preparations, grew curious when over a four-week period in November 1972 sources of information suddenly began to "dry up", in the words of historian Alexandre Binda. "They sensed that something was afoot, but their superiors brushed off their fears," Binda says. "The senior Rhodesian authorities had been lulled into a sense of arrogant self-confidence based on the security forces' past successes." This false veneer of security was smashed on 21 December 1972 when a group of ten ZANLA cadres led by Rex Nhongo (Note: "Rex Nhongo" was the chimurenga name (nom de guerre) of Solomon Tapfumaneyi Mutuswa, who changed his surname to Mujuru during the mid-1970s. Nhongo is Shona for "male goat".) attacked the white-owned Altena Farm near the north-eastern village of Centenary, about 30 kilometres (19 mi) west of Mount Darwin.

ZANLA had planned for four attacks to take place simultaneously but in the event only Nhongo's men did so. According to historian Elaine Windrich, Nhongo was a former employee of the tobacco farm's 37-year-old owner, Marc de Borchgrave, and held a grudge against him. The cadres shot up the farm house with AK-47 assault rifles and threw grenades through the windows, then retreated and hid amongst the local population. Nobody was killed in the attack but the farmer's eight-year-old daughter, Jane, was wounded in the foot. The isolated house had no telephone or any other means of contacting neighbours, and de Borchgrave was wary of being ambushed should he drive his car out, so after a short time comforting the children he set out across country on foot to seek help and alert the authorities. This done, he returned and took his wife and children to another farm nearby, Whistlefield, which was owned by Archie Dalgluish and his family.

Despite the warnings of their intelligence officers, the security chiefs were caught completely by surprise. The RLI headquarters and all three Commandos were deployed in the Zambezi valley on routine border-control duty, and Support Group was at Cranborne Barracks. A troop of Support Group men under Second Lieutenant Ian Buttenshaw was despatched to Centenary the next day along with a troop of SAS, led by Bert Sachse. In their preliminary sweep around Altena Farm they discovered a land mine planted in the road, but no insurgents. While the security forces were patrolling around Altena, Nhongo's men approached Whistlefield Farm in the late evening of 22 December and, as at Altena, attacked the farm house with rifle fire, grenades and an RPG-7 rocket launcher, which was aimed into the bedroom in which de Borchgrave was sleeping. The rocket hit the window frame and lightly wounded the tobacco farmer and his nine-year-old daughter Anne. The ZANLA cadres then retreated and hid themselves. News of the second attack reached Buttenshaw and Sachse around midnight, and they deployed immediately, but having discovered a mine near Altena they disembarked from the vehicles 1 kilometre (0.62 mi) from Whistlefield and made the final approach on foot. Anne was evacuated by helicopter as the RLI and SAS men secured the area for the night.

The next morning, on 24 December 1972, two tracking teams arrived at Whistlefield to assist Buttenshaw and Sachse in a 360-degree search: one was from the SAS, and led by Ron Marillier, while the other was a British South Africa Police (BSAP) team including tracking dogs. The security forces searched for tracks while also investigating reported sightings. The tracks of the ZANLA fighters were discovered on 27 December on the western side of the farm and the trackers asked Buttenshaw and Sachse to bring the vehicles carrying the heavy equipment around to meet them. On the way the truck carrying Buttenshaw ran over a mine with one of its rear wheels, causing it to detonate. Buttenshaw himself, who was sitting on the bonnet of the vehicle, was thrown clear but Corporal Norman Moore and Trooper Pete Botha, sitting in the back, were not as fortunate, taking the brunt of the blast. Captain Gordon Holloway, behind the wheel, and Trooper Rod Boden in the passenger seat went into severe shock but were ultimately unharmed. Moore, on the other hand, died two days later from his wounds, while Botha survived but lost both legs.

In their haste, Nhongo's cadres had not attempted to conceal their tracks as they headed west, towards the Musengezi river—Buttenshaw's pursuant RLI men therefore realised how quickly the guerrillas were moving and sped up their chase. The Rhodesians stopped for the night in a rocky area near a stream, replenished their scanty water supply and continued at dawn. About half an hour after setting off they crossed a vlei to discover a recently vacated guerrilla camp. "The fire was still burning and the food still warm," Buttenshaw writes. "From the abandoned kit a hurried departure appeared evident." Support was summoned from the SAS, who were tasked to set up stops along the Musengezi to the west. Buttenshaw's men reached the top of the Musengezi valley to see Rhodesian helicopters dropping the SAS soldiers at regular intervals along the river, as well as the ZANLA cadres, who were moving straight towards one of the SAS stops. The stop opened fire and killed some; the rest of the guerrillas scattered and ran. Buttenshaw's RLI men were then withdrawn from the follow-up for a day and a half and placed in stop positions. The chase was temporarily taken over by the SAS under Lieutenant Chris Schulenburg before Buttenshaw's men returned on 30 December 1972. Soon after setting out that morning they discovered an unarmed, wounded ZANLA fighter who had been shot in the arm by the SAS in the initial contact two days earlier. He had hidden himself after being abandoned by his comrades, and since then had lost a great deal of blood.

For the first time the Rhodesian Security Forces were faced with a seemingly insoluble problem ... after carrying out their attacks the terrorists had not gone to ground in bush-camps in uninhabited areas where they could eventually be tracked down ... neither had they gone to ground in inhabited areas where information from the local population to the Police or Special Branch had indicated their whereabouts. This time there was nothing. No tracks ... no information.

— Lieutenant-Colonel Ron Reid-Daly, writing in 1982, explains the effect of ZANLA's subversion on rural Rhodesia

After two years of patient preparation, the farm attacks by ZANLA near Centenary marked the effective start of its "Second Chimurenga" (Note: The "First Chimurenga" in question is the Second Matabele War, a series of Ndebele and Shona insurgencies against the British South Africa Company administration in 1896–97.) against the Rhodesian government. The effectiveness of ZANLA's adopted Maoist tactics was demonstrated in particular by the element of surprise they were now able to use against the security forces, and by the ability they had achieved to melt seamlessly into the local population between strikes. The rural black people in the north-east of the country were now, in Binda's words, "almost totally subverted and intimidated" by ZANLA and provided the guerrillas with food, shelter and manpower. Rather than having the tribesmen actively volunteer information about insurgent movements and locations, as had happened during previous infiltrations, the Rhodesian Security Forces now met an increasingly silent and sometimes hostile welcome from the rural blacks. More farm attacks took place over the following weeks, during December 1972 and January 1973, leading the security forces to set up Operation Hurricane in northern Mashonaland. This counter-insurgency operation would continue right up to 1980. "It was the start of a whole new ball game," writes Lieutenant-Colonel R. E. H. Lockley. "The war proper had started."

=== Cordon sanitaire—protected villages and minefields ===
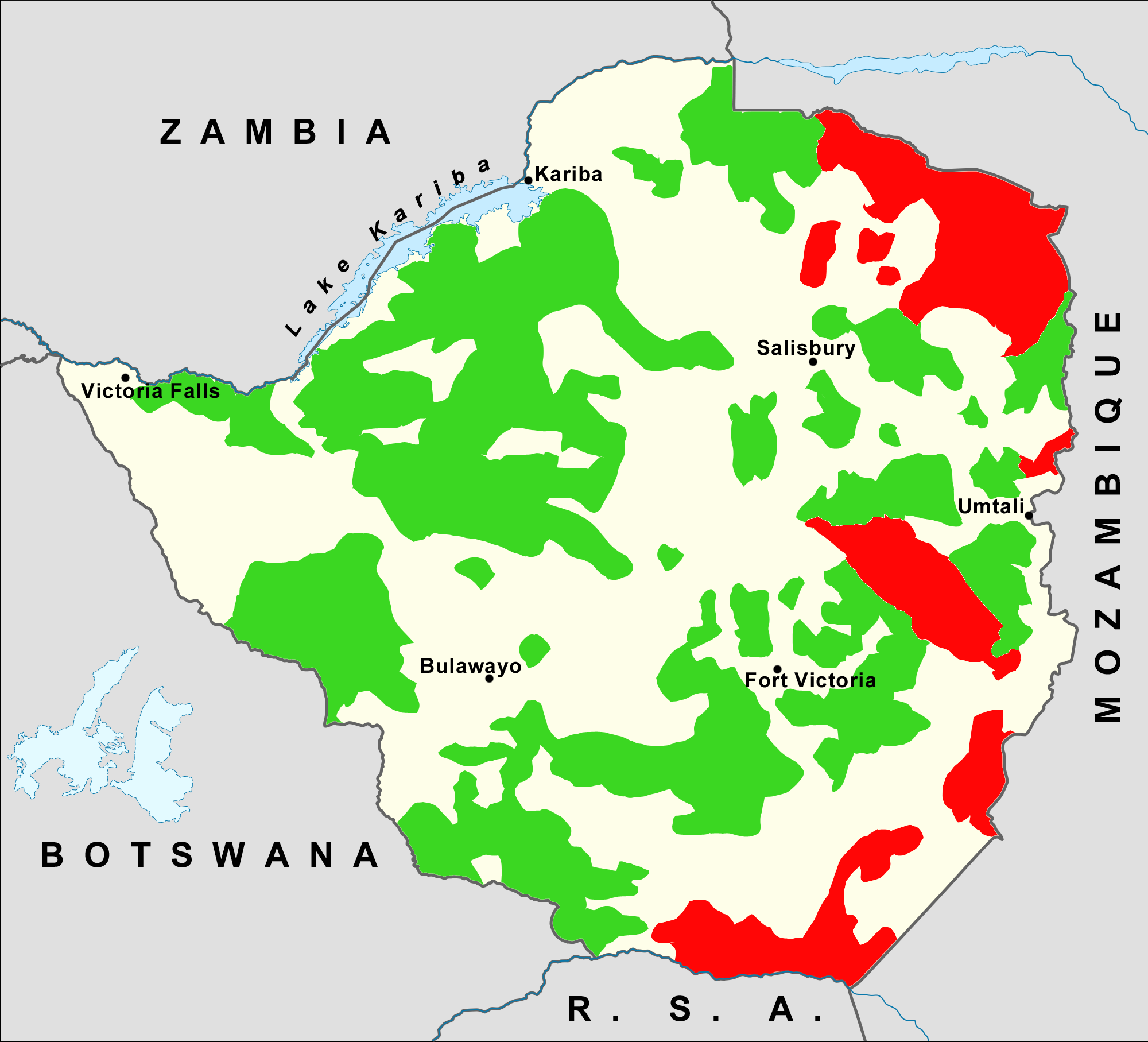
Existing and planned protected villages (PVs) on 6 January 1978:

As another part of their tactical shift the Rhodesians set up protected villages (PVs) to protect tribesmen and their families and deny the insurgents access to them. Starting in May 1974, they also set up a so-called "cordon sanitaire"—a vast mine field along the borders with Zambia and Mozambique, about 1,400 kilometres (870 mi) long and varying between 8 kilometres (5 mi) and 30 kilometres (19 mi) wide. ZANLA eventually estimated that during the entire war it lost 8,000 of its fighters to the minefield while attempting to cross it. Lieutenant-Colonel A. N. O. MacIntyre was replaced as commanding officer of the RLI on 17 April 1973 by Lieutenant-Colonel R. W. Southey.

ZANLA cadres attacked the school at St Albert's Mission between Centenary and Mount Darwin in July 1973 and abducted 292 pupils and staff, whom they force-marched north into the Zambezi valley and towards Mozambique. They were intercepted by the Rhodesian Security Forces and all but eight of the children and staff were recovered. Similar abductions were repeated over the following years and the security forces found themselves increasingly unable to prevent them. The captured schoolchildren would be marched to ZANLA bases in Mozambique where they would undergo political "re-education" (Abbott's and Botham's words) and guerrilla training.

The security forces attempted to prevent the rural blacks from cooperating with ZANLA by instituting collective punishment on villages where cadres were known to have received assistance: for example, curfews would be imposed, and schools and stores closed. A more extreme example came in April 1974 when nearly 200 local people from the Madziwa Tribal Trust Lands were resettled to another part of the country "as punishment for assisting terrorists." "At this stage the majority of the local population were not necessarily supporters of either ZANU or ZAPU," writes historian Jakkie Cilliers. "Collective punishment measures such as these could only have had serious negative effects on the attitude of the black rural masses."

The Protected Village Programme started on 27 July 1974, when Operation Overload began in the Chiweshe Tribal Trust Lands, where according to Reid-Daly "apparent support for the ZANLA cause was, without doubt, overwhelming". Over the course of six weeks, 49,960 rural people were moved into 21 protected villages. People in the northern Chiweshe area had been subject to violent political intimidation by ZANLA, and so for the most part moved willingly, but in the southern part of the area, where support for the cadres was stronger, resistance was encountered. The security forces destroyed the old huts after their occupants had moved. "In the short term, benefits seemed substantial," says Cilliers, "as insurgent activities were severely disrupted in Chiweshe for the following six months." The security forces immediately set about a similar operation called Overload Two in the Madziwa Tribal Trust Lands, which met with further success. (Note: Although initially successful, the protected villages ultimately proved counter-productive for the security forces. Cilliers cites the "lack of emphasis on concurrent socio-economic conditions" as a negative factor, pointing out the lack of sanitation and other facilities in most of the villages, as well as the fact that they were not sufficiently guarded. Wood agrees, saying that the villages "were never adequately policed or protected and the people were not involved in their management [or] persuaded of their necessity." Because of the inadequate financial backing for the PVs they were not developed properly, and their locations were often too far from the fields where the villagers grew their crops. Village administration was poor to the extent that in numerous cases ZANLA guerrillas were able to use them as hiding places. "Most important of all," Wood concludes, the protected villages "took the people away from the burial sites of their ancestors, which they venerated." The PVs lasted until 1978, when they were dismantled.) This combined with the effectiveness of the recently formed Selous Scouts to reduce ZANLA influence in the area and force the cadres back to the north, towards Mozambique. After their lapse in concentration the security forces had begun to regain control.

=== The birth of Fireforce ===
The doctrine which became the RLI's characteristic action, Fireforce, had first been discussed by RLI and Rhodesian Air Force (RhAF) officers in the early 1970s. The security forces considered how to contact the guerrillas on their own terms; the new ZANLA tactics were based around deliberately avoiding confrontation so far as was possible and hiding amongst the local population, so it was difficult for the Rhodesians to fight them face-to-face. Chasing the nationalists with trackers was ineffective as the tracker, in order to find the guerrilla's tracks, had to move slower, and air pursuit, when used alone, was deemed similarly ineffective. A tactic which combined the two was developed jointly, given the name "Fireforce" by Lieutenant Chris Pearce of the RLI, (Note: Pearce's original spelling was "Fire Force", but the name is now generally rendered as one word.) and first deployed in January 1974, at Mount Darwin. When it was first used in action a month later, on 24 February 1974, the RLI and RhAF air support eliminated a ZANLA group.

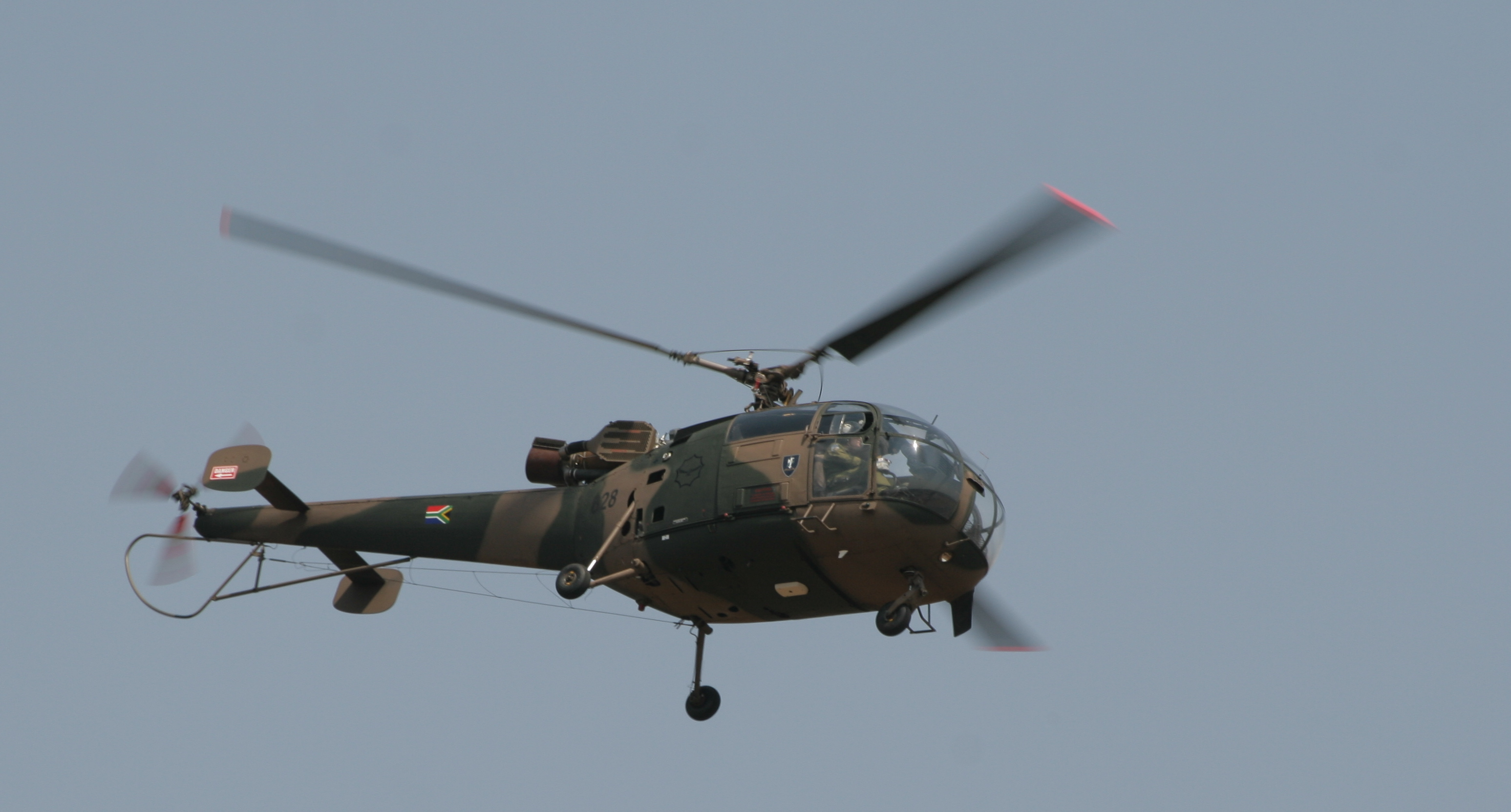
Fireforce was based largely around the use of Alouette IIIs, like this one of the South African Air Force.

Fireforce was a variant on the vertical envelopment tactic in which ground troops would be carried directly to the target by air and dropped. It was designed to react instantly to guerrilla ambushes, farm attacks and sightings, and could also be called upon by members of the security forces as reinforcements. Preparatory deployment was very flexible: all that was required for a base was an airstrip. There would usually be three main Fireforces in operation at each time, each of which would be handled by a company-sized body of men, usually one of the RLI Commandos or a company of the Rhodesian African Rifles. (Note: The basic Fireforce doctrine, published by the Operations Co-ordinating Committee in June 1975, recommended that only "well-trained troops" such as the Rhodesian Light Infantry or Rhodesian African Rifles be assigned the procedure. However, other units with their own high level of specifically-relevant training were sometimes used, such as the SAS and Territorial Force.) The unit in question would be posted at a forward airfield for six weeks (though sometimes for longer) and given responsibility for thousands of square kilometres of Rhodesian countryside. The Selous Scouts' hidden forward observation posts (OPs) allowed for instant reactions by Fireforce to sightings of the enemy guerrillas.

When an attack, contact or sighting was reported a siren would sound throughout the base and the troopers would rush out to react in two "Waves". The First Wave of 32 soldiers would be transported to the area aboard Alouette III helicopters, commonly called "G-cars", (Note: The word "G-car" comes from "gunship".) and would be accompanied by a further Alouette III, acting as command gunship (or "K-car" (Note: The term "K-car" originated as an abbreviation of "killer car".)) and a Cessna Skymaster (or "Lynx") light support aircraft. Each Alouette could carry a "stick" of four soldiers, (Note: From a "stick" of paratroopers) so on Fireforce the First Wave was organised into eight four-man "stops". The remainder of the Commando, the Second Wave, would either be carried by the same aircraft, which returned to collect them, or move by truck at the same time as the First Wave. The object of Fireforce was to quickly trap and wipe out guerrilla groups before they could evacuate the area, so the element of surprise was important, but this was difficult to maintain because of the noise of an Alouette III's jet engine; on a windy day in the quiet bush, an Alouette III can be heard downwind many kilometres away. Hearing the Fireforce coming from this distance would give the cadres plenty of time to hide themselves, so the RhAF pilots would attempt to approach their targets heading upwind to minimise this effect.

Fireforce, used in conjunction with the Selous Scouts' methods, proved very effective for the security forces, who began to gain the upper hand; the doubling of the length of National Service from six to 12 months also contributed, as it gave the Rhodesians more troops. Conscripted men had first entered the RLI ranks in 1973 and were used in increasing numbers to make up shortages in manpower. Under the leadership of a new commanding officer, Lieutenant-Colonel David Parker (Note: Lieutenant-Colonel David Gladwell Parker became the RLI's commanding officer on 1 May 1974.)—nicknamed "The King" by the RLI men—the Battalion also embarked on a large and successful overseas recruitment drive starting in 1974, seeking foreign volunteers from Europe, the Americas and Oceania. The security forces struck back strongly against ZANLA during 1974, killing 345 of its guerrillas and 75% of its leadership; during October and November 1974 the Rhodesians killed more insurgents than they had during the entire previous two years. Less than 300 ZANLA cadres remained in the country at the end of that year, with Cilliers giving an official Rhodesian figure of 70. All were confined to north-eastern Rhodesia and were retreating towards Mozambique.

== Political complications overseas affect the conflict ==
=== Portuguese support for Rhodesia is withdrawn; that of South Africa wavers ===
The impact of the security forces' decisive counter-campaign was to be undone by two drastic changes to the geopolitical situation in 1974 and 1975, each relating to one of the Rhodesian government's two main backers, Portugal and South Africa. In Lisbon, a military coup on 25 April 1974 replaced the right-wing Estado Novo administration with a leftist government opposed to the unpopular Colonial War in Angola, Mozambique and Portugal's other African territories. Following this coup, which became known as the Carnation Revolution, Portuguese leadership was hurriedly withdrawn from Lisbon's overseas territories, each of which was earmarked for an immediate handover to communist guerrillas. Brief, frenzied negotiations with FRELIMO in Mozambique preceded the country's independence on 25 June 1975; FRELIMO took power without contesting an election, while Machel assumed the presidency. Now that Mozambique was under a friendly government, ZANLA could freely base themselves there with the full support of Machel and FRELIMO, with whom an alliance had already existed since the late 1960s. The Rhodesian Security Forces, on the other hand, now had a further 1,100 kilometres (680 mi) of border to defend and had to rely on South Africa alone for imports.

The government of South Africa, however, had already altered its stance in late 1974, when it had adopted a doctrine of "détente" with the Frontline States. (Note: The Frontline States were a group of countries aiming to achieve black majority rule in the Republic of South Africa. In 1974 they were Zambia, Tanzania and Botswana. Angola and Mozambique each joined on achieving independence from Portugal in 1975.) In an attempt to resolve the situation in Rhodesia, South African Prime Minister B. J. Vorster negotiated a deal: Zambian President Kenneth Kaunda would prevent infiltrations by Rhodesian guerrillas and in return Rhodesian Prime Minister Ian Smith would agree to a ceasefire and "release all political detainees"—the leaders of ZANU and ZAPU—who would then attend a conference in Rhodesia, united under a single banner and led by Bishop Abel Muzorewa and his African National Council (ANC). Vorster hoped that if this were successful the Frontline States would grant recognition to South Africa, despite the continuation of apartheid, and enter full diplomatic relations.

Under pressure from Pretoria to accept the terms, the Rhodesians agreed on 11 December 1974 and followed the terms of the ceasefire; Rhodesian military actions were temporarily halted and troops were ordered to allow retreating guerrillas to leave unhindered. Vorster withdrew some 2,000 members of the South African Police (SAP) from forward bases in Rhodesia, and by August 1975 had pulled the SAP out of Rhodesia completely. The nationalists used the sudden cessation of security force activity as an opportunity to regroup and re-establish themselves both inside and outside the country. Guerrilla operations continued: an average of six incidents a day were reported inside Rhodesia over the following months. Far from being seen as a gesture of potential reconciliation, the ceasefire and release of the nationalist leaders gave the message to the rural population that the security forces had been defeated and that the guerrillas were in the process of emulating FRELIMO's victory in Mozambique. The détente terms led to the Victoria Falls Conference of August 1975, which collapsed after nine-and-a-half hours, each side blaming the other for the break-up.

=== An unsuccessful Fireforce for 2 Commando, 19 July 1975 ===
Unsuccessful contacts were the exception rather than the norm for the RLI, particularly on Fireforce. An example is an encounter with guerrillas in the Kandeya Tribal Trust Lands, north of Mount Darwin, on 19 July 1975. On that day a Territorial Force (TF) unit engaged a group of cadres near a river and killed two without suffering casualties. The nationalist fighters retreated into a defensive ambush position on the banks, beneath the roots of some overhanging trees. The Territorials then summoned a Fireforce made up of 7 and 10 Troops, 2 Commando from Mount Darwin, and on arrival made a sweep of the river line, accompanied by 10 Troop. When the Rhodesians rounded a bend in the stream the concealed insurgents opened fire, immediately killing a Territorial sergeant and RLI Rifleman Hennie Potgieter. Rifleman Ken Lucas, an FN MAG gunner, suffered a wound to his leg. After the initial burst of fire, the insurgents remained behind their cover and waited, concealed from security force eyes. Judging from the silence and inactivity that the guerrillas had fled, and thinking that the two downed men were still alive, Major Hank Meyer told Lieutenant Joe du Plooy to sweep around the river with two 7 Troop sticks and send a medic out to give treatment.

Lieutenant du Plooy took his men around the bend behind cover, then sent his American medic, Corporal John Alan Coey of Columbus, Ohio, out into the open streambed to render medical assistance. Though his prominent Red Cross flag was clearly visible, the hidden cadres immediately opened fire on Coey, who was killed almost instantly by a shot through the head. His body fell at du Plooy's feet. The stand-off continued for the rest of the day, during which time du Plooy and one other RLI man were wounded. The security forces were only able to gather their dead for evacuation when darkness fell. During the night, the Rhodesians deployed stops in ambush positions around the insurgents' position to prevent an escape. When the guerrillas attempted to sneak through the security force perimeter in the early hours, they ran into Corporal Jannie de Beer's RLI men and a fire fight ensued; guerrillas shot de Beer dead and wounded one of his troopers as they broke through and quickly left the area. The morale of 2 Commando's men took a noticeable hit after this unsuccessful Fireforce in which the cadres had killed four Rhodesian soldiers and wounded four more.

=== Freedom of the City, 25 July 1975; the RLI "on the town" ===
The RLI received the Freedom of the City of Salisbury in a ceremony on 25 July 1975 in recognition of its achievements in the field. After the ceremony at the Town House, the RLI performed their first parade since 1970, marching through the streets of the capital with bayonets fixed. The men stood in line as Parker reviewed the troops, followed by Majors Charlie Aust, "Boet" Swart and Pat Armstrong. The scroll bestowing the Freedom of the City was then paraded past the men, followed by the regimental colours, which were carried by Lieutenant Richard Passaportis.

From rowdy, boisterous behaviour to downright criminal activities, RLI troopers were a never-ending social menace. At any one time, over half the inmates in Detention Barracks were RLI personnel ...

— Lance-Corporal Chris Cocks recalls the RLI's less than creditable off-duty reputation

The awarding of the Freedom of the City was controversial in some quarters because of the far-from-clean reputation of RLI soldiers while off duty. "The RLI's own brand of mayhem and havoc", in Binda's words, was infamous—while they were on rest and recuperation, alcohol-fuelled fights would routinely erupt in Salisbury bars and nightclubs between RLI men and their civilian counterparts over women, perceived bad service or simple misunderstandings. These sometimes led to the summoning of the police, but the soldiers' vehement, combative refusal to be arrested made this step somewhat counter-productive. Apart from these violent confrontations with civilian men and policemen, stunts pulled by off-duty RLI men often took the form of immature pranks on women: for example, soldiers would defecate in a girl's handbag while she was on the dancefloor, or sneak into the ladies' lavatories to rub extremely itchy buffalo beans on the seats and paper. Sometimes they went even further; on one occasion, two men were given a lift back to Cranborne Barracks by an elderly lady, whose handbag they then stole. On another night, an RLI soldier tossed a fragmentation grenade into a taxi, then ran away. In the most extreme cases, men would be disciplined, but the Regiment's officers would often turn a blind eye to less serious incidents as they were so common.

The presence of the RLI's two conflicting reputations—excellent in the field, but appalling at home—is evident from the line of reporting taken by The Rhodesia Herald on 25 July 1975. Alongside the front-page article announcing the award and the day's parade through Salisbury, there prominently appears a cartoon satirising the RLI's off-duty antics. Two RLI officers in dress uniform are portrayed in a Salisbury street, both turning angrily to see a uniformed RLI trooper chasing a crowd of terrified, screaming young women across the road. One of the officers barks his disapproval, which is spelt out in the caption underneath: "Freedom of the City doesn't mean you can do that, Van Schalkwyk!"

=== Helicopter accident near Cashel: key Rhodesian officers are killed ===
Lieutenant-Colonel David Parker ended his tenure as RLI commanding officer on 30 November 1975, when he was promoted to the rank of Colonel. Less than a month later, on 23 December, he was killed in a helicopter crash near Cashel, just south of Umtali, along with three other officers: Major-General John Shaw, Captain John Lamb and Captain Ian Robinson. A South African Air Force Alouette III piloted by Air Sub-Lieutenant Johannes van Rensburg was flying the four officers from Umtali to Melsetter, with Sergeant Pieter van Rensburg (no relation) also aboard as flight technician. Flying at low altitude, in keeping with procedure, the helicopter flew into a rusty, long forgotten hawser cable, unmarked on any maps and years before used to pass logs down a steep slope. The aircraft broke up, spun out of control and crashed. All on board were killed except for the pilot, who was seriously injured, losing one of his legs. The Historians Hannes Wessels and P. J. H. Petter-Bowyer agree that the deaths of these men, and Parker in particular, affected the course of the conflict in the guerrillas' favour: Shaw was Rhodesia's "next Army Commander", says Petter-Bowyer, and Parker "its finest field commander". The Colonel was "earmarked for bigger things", Wessels writes, "... his loss was a considerable blow to the [Rhodesian] war effort."

== After the failure of détente, the war resumes and escalates ==
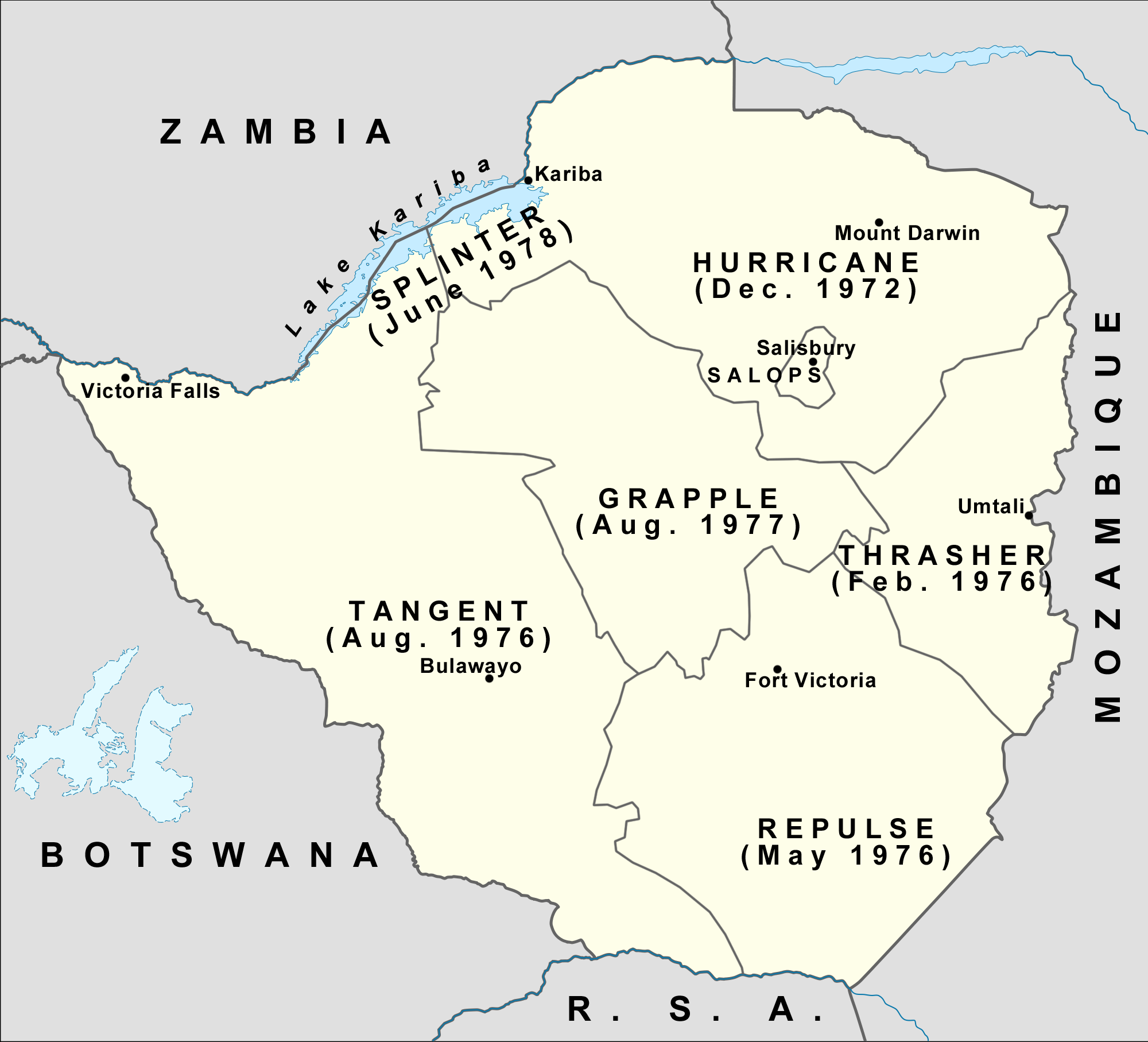
Over the course of the 1970s, the Rhodesian Security Forces defined seven operational areas across the country. The first, Operation Hurricane, was set up in December 1972. Operation Thrasher followed in February 1976, and by the end of the war Operations Grapple, Repulse, Splinter and Tangent were also running. A seventh operational area existed for the capital, Salisbury, which was called SALOPS ("Salisbury Operations").

=== The opening of Operations Thrasher, Repulse and Tangent ===
Lieutenant-Colonel Peter Rich took over the command of the RLI on the same day as the accident near Cashel. One of his first acts was to make Support Group a Commando in its own right: the new "Support Commando" was created on 6 January 1976, under the command of Major Pat Armstrong, and moved out of Base Group headquarters into its own offices directly next door. Guerrilla incursions renewed in the first months of 1976, with three waves of nationalists crossing from Mozambique between January and April. The first group of 90 fighters crossed the border south of Nyamapanda on 21 January, and was immediately repulsed, four cadres being killed and one captured by the security forces. The attack on Nyamapanda was supposed to be one part of a three-pronged invasion, but the nationalist operation did not go to plan: the second group of 130 guerrillas attacked the Melsetter area five weeks later and the third assault, in Rhodesia's south-east, did not take place until another seven weeks after that, in April 1976—three months behind schedule.

Smith addressed the nation on the evening of 6 February 1976, warning that "a new terrorist offensive has begun and, to defeat it, Rhodesians will have to face heavier military commitments." Mozambique formally declared a state of war with Rhodesia a month later, on 3 March. With security force reports indicating that around 1,000 fighters were active within Rhodesia, with a further 15,000 encamped in various states of readiness in Mozambique, three more Rhodesian operational areas were defined in addition to Operation Hurricane. Operation Thrasher, covering Rhodesia's eastern highlands, was designated in February 1976, and Operations Repulse and Tangent, handling the south-east and west respectively, followed in May and August.

The ZANLA and ZIPRA cadres were officially working together, but in reality the armies' relationship was fraught with tension. As well as tribal lines—ZANLA's men were predominantly Shona, whilst ZIPRA's were mostly Ndebele—there were political issues and differences of opinion regarding doctrine. ZANLA favoured a continuation of their existing Maoist tactics, spreading themselves amongst the rural people and politicising them "by fair means or foul", as Wood says, while ZIPRA preferred to overtly recruit fighters and train them overseas for conventional invasions. ZIPRA's relative inactivity in the war since 1970 also contributed to the sentiment amongst some ZANLA cadres that their supposed allies in the chimurenga were not pulling their weight. As ZANLA were superior in number to ZIPRA, their men began to usurp positions of command and authority at the joint training facilities abroad, which made the strain yet more potent. The mutual ill-feeling finally boiled over into open clashes at two training camps in Tanzania, Mugagao and Morogoro, in early 1976; in one incident, 400 nationalists were killed, while in another 200 died. Despite the continued animosity, combined guerrilla groups continued to enter Rhodesia, usually made up of eight ZANLA and two ZIPRA men; according to Lockley, the ZIPRA fighters so disliked their ZANLA comrades that they would sometimes deliberately become separated, desert and go home rather than fight alongside them.

=== The Rhodesian "foreign legion": the RLI ranks are bolstered by conscripts and foreign volunteers ===
In many respects the RLI was a mirror of the French Foreign Legion, in that recruiters paid little heed as to a man's past and asked no questions ... And like the Foreign Legion, once in the ranks, a man's past was irrelevant.

— Lance-Corporal Chris Cocks, RLI, on the recruitment of foreign soldiers

The RLI's drive for foreign volunteers, launched in earnest in 1974, proved very successful, attracting hundreds of recruits from all over the world. The increased inclusion of conscripted men combined with this to gradually change the character and dynamics of the Regiment. A "watershed in the history of the RLI", says Cocks, is Intake 150, which passed out in May 1976. RLI Intake 150 was the largest ever, and was made up mostly of 18-year-old national servicemen, "many of whom", Cocks continues, "simply did not want to be there". The foreign volunteers alongside them were greater in number than ever before, and the absorption of men from overseas would increase yet further as the war went on.

Whereas conscripted men had previously been of a small enough volume that they could be gently assimilated into the combat ranks over time, Intake 150 gave the RLI so many new, inexperienced rookies that they would often outnumber the veterans in the field. Casualties were unusually high amongst Intake 150 members during their first month in action, and this trend continued for inexperienced men for the rest of the Battalion's history—in the most extreme case, on 10 June 1979, Trooper Robbie Francis was killed on his first day as a member of 3 Commando. P. K. van der Byl, the Minister of Defence, reviewed the new recruits and addressed them with fiery vigour as they passed out, then answered questions from the press in a similar vein. When the possibility of open Cuban military intervention on the side of the guerrillas was raised, Van der Byl declared that the Rhodesian Army would "beat the life and soul out of them".

Soldiers from overseas serving in the Rhodesian forces received the same pay and conditions of service as locally based regulars. Almost all of them mustered into the RLI, though some joined the SAS. Many were professional soldiers, attracted by the Regiment's reputation: most prevalent were former members of the British Armed Forces, and Vietnam veterans from the United States, Australian and New Zealand forces. (Note: In The Saints, Cocks gives a list of "[veterans of the] American Green Berets and Airborne units, the British Paras, Green Jackets, Royal Marines, SAS, Grenadier Guards (to name but a few) and a fair sprinkling of Aussie and Kiwi Vietnam vets, plus sundry Legionnaires, South Africans, Germans, Brazilians, Portuguese et al.") The seasoned foreigners "soon became an integral part of the Battalion", Cocks writes, contributing to the RLI's fine reputation and also passing their experience onto the young, recently conscripted men.

Some foreign volunteers had no military experience and found themselves in a similar situation to the Rhodesian teenagers. These foreigners were generally motivated to enlist by anti-communist political views, hunger for adventure, turbulent personal lives in their home countries or some combination of these factors. The Canadian Mathew Charles Lamb joined 3 Commando, RLI in 1973, having just spent six years in a psychiatric hospital. In June 1966, aged 18, he had killed two strangers in a shooting spree in his home-town, but avoided the death penalty on a court ruling that at the time of the incident he had been insane. Keeping his past life a secret, he became a popular and well-regarded soldier in 3 Commando, and eventually rose to the rank of Lance-Corporal, taking command of a Fireforce stick on Operation Thrasher shortly before he was killed in action on 7 November 1976 by an errant shot from one of his own men.

=== The Battle of "Hill 31" ===
Call sign 81A of K Company, Rhodesia Regiment (RR), patrolling the Mutasa North Tribal Trust Lands on Operation Thrasher, spotted a group of insurgents about 30 to 40 strong at 04:45 on 15 November 1976, just south of a kraal in the Honde Valley, about 55 kilometres (34 mi) north of Umtali and 10 kilometres (6.2 mi) from the Mozambique border. The guerrillas were marching south in single file along a steep slope on the western side of a rugged, bush-covered kopje, which was tall and littered with gullies and other natural obstacles. Call sign 81A called up Fireforce, and 3 Commando, RLI soon arrived, commanded from the K-car by Captain Chris "Kip" Donald. The 3 Commando men were dropped to the west of the area and four Territorial Force trackers, headed by Sergeant Laurie Ryan, came down beside the RR men and followed the insurgents' tracks to the south along a footpath. They found two cadres lying down in the grass, about 2 metres (6 ft 7 in) away from the path, and shot and killed both. As they continued around the mountain, Ryan's men ran straight into the main group of nationalists at about 05:45. A succession of frantic contacts followed at extremely close range as Donald's RLI sticks swept around and in towards the area. An armed insurgent was discovered in hiding by one of the sticks, and flushed out; as he ran, he pointed his AK-47 behind him and let off a burst of blind shots. One of these hit and killed Trooper Francisco Deart da Costa of 11 Troop, 3 Commando, RLI, a 31-year-old man from Portugal who had recently volunteered because of unemployment in his home country. His body was casevaced to Ruda, the local Special Branch base, as the battle continued, turning swiftly in the security forces' favour.

The MG 151/20 20 mm cannon mounted on the K-car "proved extremely effective", Binda says, firing down on the cadres to cut off escape routes, and killing several of them as the Rhodesian soldiers advanced in from all directions. Support Company of the Rhodesian African Rifles (RAR) was called as backup. Donald's stick leaders were all performing well, with the leader of Stop 3, Trooper Pete Garnett, moving forward particularly aggressively. RLI Rifleman Grobler was lightly wounded and evacuated to Ruda, as were two privates of the RAR, Philip Chagwiza and Chikoto Saxon, who were both hit by small arms fire from the ground while still in the helicopters. The cadres had taken up a defensive position near the top of the western side of the mountain and were directing almost all of their rifle fire at the aircraft. An RPG was fired, which narrowly missed a Rhodesian G-car carrying troops and exploded only 20 metres (66 ft) behind it; another helicopter was forced to land by damage caused by insurgent rifle fire. The RLI and RAR sticks, who now had the nationalist fighters surrounded, continued to close in throughout the day, and by the end of the battle at 20:00 31 cadres had been killed and one captured; the rest escaped. The security forces recovered 21 AK-47 assault rifles, 11 SKS semi-automatic rifles, one RPD light machine-gun, one RPG-2 rocket launcher (with 21 rockets), 19 boxes of ammunition and a landmine.

Of the Rhodesian units involved in the battle, the most prolific in terms of kills was 3 Commando, RLI. The kopje was informally dubbed "Hill 31" by the Rhodesian troopers, after the number of guerrillas killed. Donald was widely applauded for his conduct of the Rhodesian action, with Sergeant Laurie Graham telling The Rhodesia Herald that "It was a well commanded operation by Captain Donald ... at times exhilarating." Cocks agrees. "I remember how awed I was by Kip Donald's control of the battle," he writes. "He was controlling a good couple of hundred troops—RLI, RAR and TF, all spread out over several square kilometres, on all sides of the mountain." More cadres had been killed in the battle than in any other internal contact up to that point, but after "Hill 31", encounters such as this became more regular: as the war intensified and the size of the guerrilla incursions grew, the security forces would regularly engage groups of 50 insurgents or more inside Rhodesia.

== Notes and references ==
=== Online sources ===
- Wood, J. R. T. (24 May 1995). "Rhodesian Insurgency". Oudeschip: Allport Books.

=== Journal articles ===
- Lockley, Lt-Col R. E. H. (July 1990). "A brief operational history of the campaign in Rhodesia from 1964 to 1978". The Lion & Tusk. 2 (1). Southampton: Rhodesian Army Association. Archived from the original on 25 May 2022.
- Lohman, Major Charles M.; MacPherson, Major Robert I. (7 June 1983). "Rhodesia: Tactical Victory, Strategic Defeat" (PDF). War Since 1945 Seminar and Symposium. Quantico, Virginia: Marine Corps Command and Staff College.
- Melson, Charles D. (March 2005). "Top Secret War: Rhodesian Special Operations". Small Wars and Insurgencies. 16 (1). London: Routledge: 57–82. doi:10.1080/0959231042000322567. S2CID 145455177.
- Vermaak, Chris (May 1977). "Rhodesia's Selous Scouts". Armed Forces Journal International. 114 (9). Springfield, Virginia: Benjamin F. Schemmer. ISSN 0196-3597.

=== Bibliography ===
- Abbott, Peter; Botham, Philip (June 1986). Modern African Wars: Rhodesia, 1965–80. Oxford: Osprey Publishing. ISBN 978-0-85045-728-5.
- Binda, Alexandre (May 2008). The Saints: The Rhodesian Light Infantry. Johannesburg: 30° South Publishers. ISBN 978-1-920143-07-7.
- Cilliers, Jakkie (December 1984). Counter-Insurgency in Rhodesia. London, Sydney & Dover, New Hampshire: Croom Helm. ISBN 978-0-7099-3412-7.
- Cocks, Chris (June 2009) [1988]. Fireforce: One Man's War in the Rhodesian Light Infantry (Fourth ed.). Johannesburg: 30° South Publishers. ISBN 978-0-9584890-9-6.
- Horne, Gerald (December 2000). From the Barrel of a Gun: The United States and the War against Zimbabwe, 1965–1980. Chapel Hill, North Carolina: University of North Carolina Press. ISBN 978-0-8078-4903-3.
- Martin, David; Johnson, Phyllis (July 1981). The Struggle for Zimbabwe (First ed.). London: Faber and Faber. ISBN 978-0-571-11066-7.
- Moorcraft, Paul L.; McLaughlin, Peter (April 2008) [1982]. The Rhodesian War: A Military History. Barnsley: Pen and Sword Books. ISBN 978-1-84415-694-8.
- Nosanchuk, Saul (27 October 1999). "Revisiting the Insanity Defence: The Capital Murder Trial of Mathew Charles Lamb". in Greenspad, Edward L., ed. (2005). Counsel for the Defence: The Bernard Cohn Memorial Lectures in Criminal Law. Toronto, Ontario: Irwin Law. pp. 67–92. ISBN 1-55221-102-9.
- Petter-Bowyer, P. J. H. (November 2005) [2003]. Winds of Destruction: the Autobiography of a Rhodesian Combat Pilot. Johannesburg: 30° South Publishers. ISBN 978-0-9584890-3-4.
- Reid-Daly, Ron; Stiff, Peter (1982). Selous Scouts: Top Secret War. Alberton: Galago. ISBN 978-0-620-05771-4.
- Smith, Ian (June 1997). The Great Betrayal: The Memoirs of Ian Douglas Smith. London: John Blake Publishing. ISBN 1-85782-176-9.
- The South African Democracy Education Trust ("SADET") (November 2005). The Road to Democracy in South Africa, Volume 1, 1960–1970. Cape Town: Struik Publishers. ISBN 978-1-86872-906-7.
- Wessels, Hannes (July 2010). P. K. van der Byl: African Statesman. Johannesburg: 30° South Publishers. ISBN 978-1-920143-49-7.
- Williams, Gwyneth; Hackland, Brian (July 1988). The Dictionary of Contemporary Politics of Southern Africa (First ed.). London: Routledge. ISBN 978-0-415-00245-5.
- Windrich, Elaine (13 March 1975). The Rhodesian problem: a documentary record, 1923–1973 (First ed.). London: Routledge & Kegan Paul. ISBN 978-0-7100-8080-6.
- Wood, J. R. T. (July 2009). Cocks, Chris (ed.). Counter-strike From the Sky: The Rhodesian All-arms Fireforce in the War in the Bush 1974–1980. Johannesburg: 30° South Publishers. ISBN 978-1-920143-33-6.

=== Further reading ===
- Bond, Geoffrey (1977). The Incredibles: The Story of the 1st Battalion, The Rhodesian Light Infantry. Salisbury: Sarum Imprint. ISBN 0-7974-0233-0.
- Coey, John Alan (March 1988). A Martyr Speaks (First ed.). Fletcher, North Carolina: New Puritan Library. ISBN 978-0-932050-41-0.
- Croukamp, Dennis E. W. (December 2005). Only My Friends Call Me "Crouks": Rhodesian reconnaissance specialist. Cape Town: Pseudo Publishing. ISBN 978-0-620-29392-1.
- Gledhill, Dick (November 2001). One Commando: Rhodesian Light Infantry (Second ed.). Roodepoort: Covos Books. ISBN 978-1-919874-35-7.
