= AUST =

AUST or Aust may refer to

== Abbreviations ==
- Abbottabad University of Science and Technology in Khyber Pakhtunkhwa, Pakistan
- Ahsanullah University of Science and Technology in Dhaka, Bangladesh
- Ajman University of Science and Technology in Ajman, United Arab Emirates
- American University of Science and Technology in Beirut, Lebanon
- Anhui University of Science and Technology in Anhui Province, China
- Australia
- Austria

== People ==
- Aust (surname)

== Places ==
=== in England ===
- Aust, a village in Gloucestershire, England
  - Aust Ferry
  - Aust Cliff
  - Aust Severn Powerline Crossing

=== in Norway ===
- Aust-Agder, a county

== See also ==
- Augusta (disambiguation)
