= Fire Force (Rhodesia) =

Rhodesian military tactic

- Era: Modern
- Battlespace: Land
- Type: Counterinsurgency
- Notable uses: Rhodesian Bush War

Fire Force is a variant of the military tactic of vertical envelopment by helicopter‑borne and parachute infantry. The tactic was developed by the Rhodesian Security Forces during the Rhodesian Bush War (1964–1979). It emphasized rapid deployment of infantry by air to locate, contain, and engage insurgent units.

The tactic was primarily employed by the Rhodesian Light Infantry (RLI), the Rhodesian African Rifles (RAR), and the Special Air Service (SAS), assisted by the Air Force (RhAF). The Fire Force counterinsurgency missions were designed to intercept insurgent units of the Zimbabwe African National Liberation Army (ZANLA) and the Zimbabwe People's Revolutionary Army (ZIPRA).

The tactic was used in response to ambushes, farm attacks, observation post (OP) sightings, and calls from trackers or patrols who had made contact and required reinforcements. It was first deployed in January 1974 and saw its first combat action a month later on 24 February 1974.

An operational assault or response group under Fire Force typically consisted of a first wave of 32 soldiers transported to the scene by three Alouette helicopters (G-Cars) and one C-47 Dakota (referred to as a Paradak), with a command/gunship helicopter (K-Car variety) and a light attack aircraft (Reims-Cessna Lynx, a modified Cessna Super Skymaster) in support. The group could be deployed from a single airstrip, which was a key advantage for the use of the tactic.

== Four-man stick ==
Unlike conventional military units, Fire Force troops were broken down into 'sticks' of four men instead of the usual eight- or nine-man sections. This was because the Rhodesian Air Force Alouette III helicopters could only carry four men.

Of the four men, one was the stick leader, with an A63 or A76 VHF radio, an FN FAL rifle, 100 rounds of ammunition (7.62×51mm NATO), and several types of grenades. The second was a machine gunner with an FN MAG machine-gun and 400 rounds. The remaining two were riflemen with FN FAL rifles with 100 rounds each, as well as grenades, and rifle grenades. The grenades carried were usually one M962 high-explosive (HE) grenade, one M970 white phosphorus grenade, a smoke grenade, one or two rifle grenades, and an Icarus rocket flare each.

One of the riflemen was a trained combat medic and carried a medical pack. Every soldier also carried a saline drip. Rifles were zeroed for 100 m, and sights were set to the same range. Every third or fourth round loaded into the rifle magazine was a tracer. During 1979, one of these two men was issued a radio. Pistols were optional, and all paratroopers were entitled to carry a Belgian FN Hi-Power or Spanish Star Model B 9×19mm pistol. Each soldier also carried a lightweight sleeping bag in a mat pack on his back.

A single stick made up the stop groups (stops), patrols, ambushes, and often sweep lines, although larger sweep lines could be made up from para-sticks or by combining the sticks deployed by the G-cars, or from those sticks transported by the "Land-tail". In all formations, the MAG gunner was positioned next to the Stick Leader.

== Aircraft ==
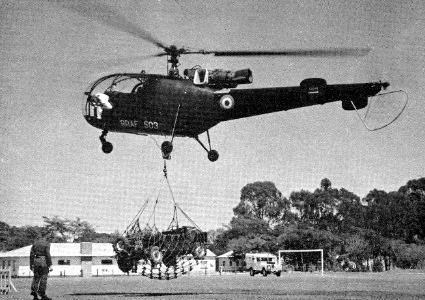
One of the Alouette III helicopters acquired by the Royal Rhodesian Air Force in 1962. The RLI used these helicopters for its Fire Force operations.

The Fire Force would be based at an airfield with usually four helicopters, one Dakota and a light-attack aircraft (known as the "Lynx").

The helicopters were Alouette IIIs (in 1979 a few Agusta-Bell 205As "Cheetahs" were used). Of these, one was equipped with a MG 151/20 20-mm cannon and flown by the senior pilot. The cannons were equipped with trays, which took 200 or 400 high explosive incendiary (HEI) rounds. This helicopter was called the "K-Car" (K denoting Kill/Command) and had a crew of three (pilot, gunner/technician (gunner-tech), and Fire Force commander). The Fire Force Commander directed ground operations from a height of 800 ft (240 m), high enough over the contact area to see everything that was happening.

Some K-Cars (known as Dalmatian K-Cars) were armed with four Browning .303 (7.7 mm) machine guns (instead of the 20-mm cannon) but were not popular with the troops, as they were less effective. The number of enemy personnel killed by the K-Car varied significantly, from zero to the entire insurgent unit. The K-Car would carry a spare FN FAL to replace any malfunctioning rifle and two A63/A76 VHF radios, a spare for the ground troops, and one for the commander in case he had to disembark the K-Car. The commander in the K-Car would carry the radio codes, specifically, the daily Shackle code. All would wear flak jackets to protect them from ground fire.

The other three helicopters were known as "G-Cars" (G denoting Gunship) and were armed with machine guns (originally one FN MAG replaced with twin Browning .303 machine guns each) with 500 rounds per gun. These G-Cars carried the 4-man Sticks along with their pilot and technician, who also operated their machine guns. The G-Cars had headsets for the stick leaders so they could stay aware of developments while in the air. The G-cars were also used for casualty evacuation and to resupply the Fire Force troops with ammunition and equipment.

The Dakota carried five sticks: two on the port side, three on the starboard. Apart from the parachutes, their equipment was identical to the heli-sticks.

The Reims-Cessna FTB 337G "Lynx" was the main light attack aircraft used on Fire Force missions. The Lynx aircraft were armed with twin Browning .303 machine guns mounted above the wing and 37 mm SNEB rockets, locally made Mini "Alpha" Bombs (cluster bombs), Mini "Golf" Bombs (450 lb (200 kg) blast and shrapnel bombs), and Frantans (frangible napalm drop tank). The Percival Provost Mk 52 was originally used in the light attack role before the Lynx came into service. Hunter ground-attack fighter jets, Canberra light bombers, and, more rarely, Vampire fighter-bombers were on 24-hour standby should a Fire Force encounter stiff resistance.

In 1979, the 'Jumbo' Fire Force came into being. The Jumbo Fire Force was created by bringing two Fire Forces together, giving it two K-Cars, eight G-Cars, a Dakota, and a Lynx, often with the support of Hunter ground-attack fighter jets.

== Tactics ==
The standard Fire Force assault consisted of one K-car, three G-cars, a Dakota, and the Lynx. Often, there was no Dakota involved or more G-cars. When, in 1979, Cheetahs (Bell Hueys) were introduced, a Fire Force might go into action with two or three of these, each carrying two (sometimes three) stops. There were many times when no Lynx was used.

Though there were only three main Fire Forces most of the time, the Fire Force had responsibility for huge swathes of Rhodesia, many thousands of square miles each. A commando of the Rhodesian Light Infantry or an infantry company of the Rhodesian African Rifles would be designated as a Fire Force at a forward airfield for six weeks, or sometimes, several months. By 1977, all Rhodesian regular infantry were trained paratroopers and would in turn be deployed by helicopter or parachute or brought in as reinforcements from the vehicles of the 'land tail'.

Any sightings of the enemy within the Fire Force zone were reported, and a siren sounded in the base. Eight sticks (32 men) were deemed the "First Wave". The First Wave troops rushed to their helicopters (after donning their webbing). The paratroopers went to the tent where their equipment and parachutes were held, and the dispatchers and off-duty comrades would help them kit out. Normally, the Second Wave (or land tail) rushed to the trucks, although if "jousting," or if the contact area was nearby, they would wait at the airfield to be picked up by the G-Cars after the First Wave had been dropped off.

Troops alternated through designations of heliborne, paratroopers, land tail, and off-duty throughout a Bush Trip. The land tail was often an important factor in the refuelling of helicopters and the recovery of deceased persons (enemy and civilian), parachutes, and enemy weapons and equipment. Sometimes there was a small third wave if numbers permitted. Quite often, only the First Wave was involved in the action. In general, most soldiers preferred to be in the heliborne First Wave.

In addition to direct insertions, the RhAF used C-47s to deliver troops to areas inaccessible by their helicopters, especially during cross-border strikes. The Rhodesians were particularly fond of airdrops, and consequently, the entire SAS and approximately half of the rest of their forces trained as paratroopers. 29 aircraft were also used to extract isolated groups of troops in emergency situations. Troops operating outside of Rhodesia wore special harnesses, which they could quickly attach to trapeze bars lowered from helicopters to rapidly hook up and depart under fire. 30 airdrops were also used to resupply troops operating away from supply areas.

The RhAF also used airpower in more traditional roles. When patrols encountered formations larger than they could handle, they would call in close air support; for example, in November 1977, an SAS patrol operating in Mozambique set up a mine-triggered ambush along a known ZANLA and FRELIMO supply route. However, when the supply convoy arrived, it consisted of over 400 troops supported by anti-aircraft artillery (AAA), a far too formidable target for either the fifteen men in the SAS patrol or helicopters. To the advantage of the SAS, the ZANLA stayed in place after the lead vehicle in the convoy struck a mine, giving the RhAF time to bring in Hunter aircraft and let the SAS stay hidden.

=== Arrival on target ===
The K-Car was always the first to arrive at the scene. The K-Car Commander had to first attempt to confirm the precise area where the enemy had been spotted by the OP. Usually, the terrain was extremely broken and covered in vegetation, which made this task particularly difficult. The K-Car Commander then had to make a plan—where to position the first stops, where to make the main sweep, and in what direction. The first troops to arrive were always brought in by the G-Cars, which followed the K-Car in a column (sometimes far behind, for they were a bit slower than the K-Car). Sometimes the sticks were dropped immediately, but on many occasions, the G-Cars would circle the scene several times before the commander made his final decisions.

Very often, the K-Car occupants would see the enemy (or any perceived enemy), and then the Helicopter Gunner/Technician would attack them with his 20 mm cannon, using bursts of two to four shells (but no more than five). The 20 mm cannon poked out of the port side; there was no "lead in", and the exploding high-velocity shells would impact right next to and often on their intended targets. The cannon fire was highly lethal, resulting in high casualty rates for those targeted by it.

Usually, the G-Car sticks were positioned in areas where the enemy would most likely traverse (often a riverbed or dry "donga"), where there was more vegetation, thereby attempting to surround or cut off enemy movement. If there was a hill or ridge that gave sweeping observation, more than one stick might be placed there. Sometimes, G-car sticks would form the main sweep line immediately after they were deployed instead of the paratroopers, depending on the circumstances at hand. The G-Cars would make dummy landings to confuse the enemy while placing men in cut-off or stop positions.

Whilst the K-Car was looking for or engaging the enemy, the commander also had to decide on where to drop the para-sticks and direct any strikes by the Lynx, which usually initiated the attack. The drop zone (DZ) position was typically dictated by the enemy's own position and the terrain, but often there would be no clear DZ nearby, in which case the para-sticks would be dropped a mile or so away to be picked up and re-positioned by the G-Cars. Usually, the para-sticks were dropped as close as possible, which resulted in numerous occasions where the Paras were being fired at whilst floating down for a few seconds. The drop heights normally varied from about 400 feet (120 m) to 600 feet. This firing was always ineffective, as no troops were ever hit. There was also a great variation on the dropping patterns of these sticks: sometimes they were all dropped at once, sometimes individually, or any combination thereof.

=== Positioning the main sweep ===
Whilst all this was taking place, one of the commander's main concerns was where the main sweep would occur. In a perfect scenario, the Para-sticks would form the main sweep, and the G-Car sticks would carry out blocking actions. In reality, there was vast variation, so there was little difference in being Para or in the First Wave Helicopter assault. First Wave strikes in the G-cars, however, were generally the best stops to be in for those wanting action.

The most important factors (apart from the enemy's response and the terrain) in a Fire Force operation were firstly the reliability of the sighting of the enemy and secondly the skill of the Fire Force commander. In the former case, the majority of successful contacts were due to the skills of the Selous Scouts (many of which were former enemies). They had the capacity to insert observation posts (OPs) into the bush without being noticed by the inhabitants. In the latter case, the difficulty of commanding the scene was extreme and good Fire Force commanders were highly prized by troops.

How quickly the enemy could pick up on the assault was decisive. Wind direction and speed, the presence of a tree-covered ridgeline or a multitude of other factors would make the difference between life or death. Where he was caught in unfavourable terrain for him (like a village surrounded by open ground) he had no chance and normally none escaped (unless it was near nightfall).

Although the number of operational parachute jumps was remarkable, the majority of troops were carried into action by helicopter.

There were many times when exiting from G-cars was dangerous, due (for example) to their being unable to descend close enough because of trees, and troops had to clamber out and hold on to the steps and drop from too great a height, with mass leaves and twigs whirling about the inside of the machine and great stress of pilot and tech. The Alouettes were much more capable of dropping off stops in rough terrain than the Bells, though they had less carrying capacity and range and speed. The Alouettes were extremely reliable (they had a tendency to sway a little as the troops jumped).

The twin-Browning .303 machine guns of the G-Cars were never indiscriminately fired by the tech. The K-Car Gunners had to be careful, for there was always a shortage of 20mm rounds (they cost around $25 each) and there were many times when friendly troops were only meters away from the target.

Tracers, smoke, or phosphorus grenade, or Mini flare (pencil flare) were used as the "Fireball" to mark a target for strike aircraft. A 37mm SNEB shoulder-launched marker rocket was locally developed and used by the Selous Scouts to identify an enemy position.

== Sweep ==
Each stick made a sweep every time it moved to a new location. This usually meant all four soldiers moving in a sweep line (extended line) formation, spaced apart according to the terrain. In flat open land, this would mean as much as twenty-five meters or so. In heavy vegetation, this dropped to several meters. Even then, it was common to lose sight of comrades, pushing alone through the denseness. It was more effective to be spaced as far apart as possible.

Whether in the main sweep (which might be composed of any number of sticks available) or in a sticks sweep, the tactics were the same and very simple: to sweep ahead, observing the line of sight ahead through the bush and undergrowth.

The speed of this movement varied. Where a stick, usually its commander, deemed the enemy to be lurking, the sweep slowed down considerably. When the troops sensed the enemy ahead, the sweep became even slower, edging forward inch by inch, rifles held at chest level, pointed ahead with the safety catch off. MAG gunners would bear the gun at the hip, held by a sling from their shoulders.

Usually, encounters with the enemy were resolved with great speed (a typical Fire Force action could take hours, whilst a firefight might take just a few seconds). In the great majority of cases, the enemy was killed outright by swift shooting (sometimes hand grenades were used). In responding to sudden incoming fire, a sweep or patrol would immediately return fire from either the prone position or from down on one knee, depending on the nature of the surrounding bush.

A deliberate attacking movement called a "Skirmish" was carried out, ending in a run-through of the enemy position. Three basic skirmishing techniques were employed, usually by Sweep lines containing a few Sticks. The first method of skirmishing involved splitting the Sweep line into two equal sections, called flanks, with one flank moving forward while the second flank covered the first. When the first flank went prone and restarted shooting, the second flank would then run forward until some meters past the line of the first, and so on. This method is the least likely to result in a friendly fire incident, but it is also the easiest to counter.

The second skirmish option had every second member of the sweep line designated as one of the flanks, with each member of that flank passing between and through members of the other. The covering flankers stopped shooting as those moving forward passed them.

The third option was called a Pepper Pot. This involved individuals of the Sweep line or Stick, randomly getting up and moving forward, or, going prone and covering, and so on. It is more difficult to implement when in larger numbers, but is also the hardest to counter because prone troops rise from their positions in a very random and seemingly uncoordinated fashion. Sticks of four always used something resembling the Pepper Pot when on the assault, or split pairs if a serious attempt at out-flanking the enemy position was intended.

Prisoners were taken on occasion. Although they were requested to take prisoners wherever possible, in a close-quarter firefight and in thick bush, it was sometimes difficult to determine an enemy's intentions. Prisoners were usually extremely valuable as they might reveal important intelligence to Special Branch or Selous Scouts. Captured guerrillas were frequently turned to work for the Rhodesian Security Forces, sometimes as Auxiliary Forces (Pfumo Re Vanhu) from 1979.

== Stop position ==
The other main experience was for an individual stick to sweep to a position thought most likely to intercept a fleeing enemy, and stay there, sometimes for up to several hours (perhaps being moved around and maybe later on joining the main sweep). More often than not nothing happened but on many occasions one or more of the enemy came down the (usual) stream bed, or nearby.

If there was a clear view then it was easy, once again just a few seconds shooting. Sometimes the process was repeated in the same spot, with fire being opened a bit earlier. Sometimes the enemy were seen behind in which case the stick immediately pursued. There were many occasions where the action was not so tidy due to terrain/vegetation, or even the sunlight blinding them.

== Communication ==
Radios were reasonably light and reliable. Most importantly they were easy to use. Headsets were not usually used instead just a telehand tied to a shoulder strap would be used. An extremely efficient form of radio speech known as Voice Procedure was used. Troops were expected to have a high degree of self-initiative and reliance. For example, if a stick leader desired, two riflemen would be detached to perform a mini-sweep (or stop position) of their own (and perhaps even an individual go off on his own). The introduction of the second radio in 1979 merely confirmed this practice.

Each Heli-borne stick was given the call-sign 'Stop' suffix by a number. Stop-1 was assigned to the first G-Car, stop-2 to the second, stop-3 to the third. Para sticks call-signs were the prefix "Banana" followed by a number. Banana-1 to Banana-5 were in the Dakota. Codes followed a similar pattern for aircraft, in that a colour was used in place of the prefix "Banana", e.g.: G-Car One might become Yellow-1. The Fire Force commander's call-sign was usually a two-digit number ending in nine, e.g.: 39 (pronounced three-nine).

To mark a target for air strike, a command would be sent to "Send Fireball".

The most important hand-signals were: Thumb up, meaning "friend", Thumb down to indicate "enemy" and Palm down on head to say "come to me".

== See also ==
- Operation Dingo
- Rhodesian African Rifles
- Rhodesian Armoured Corps
- Rhodesian Army
- Rhodesian Bush War
- Rhodesian Light Infantry
- Rhodesian Special Air Service
- Royal Rhodesian Air Force
- Selous Scouts
- List of weapons of the Rhodesian Bush War

General:

- Air assault
- Vertical Envelopment
