= The Troopie =

Rhodesian regimental statue in England

Coordinates: 51.7698°N 0.1965°W

The Trooper
- The Troopie
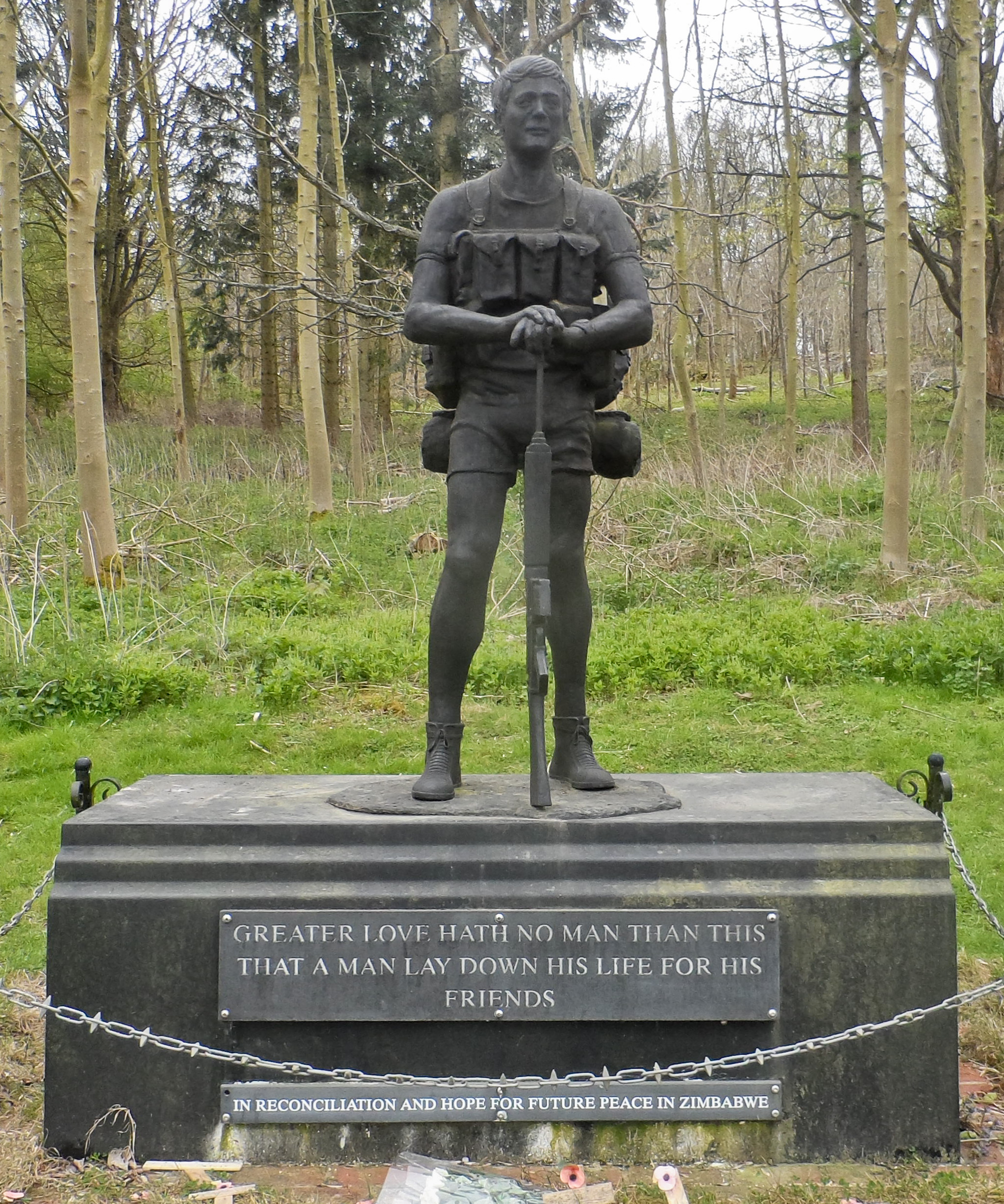
- The Trooper
- Artist: Captain Michael Blackman
- Year: 1979
- Subject: Rhodesian Light Infantryman
- Location: Hatfield, Hertfordshire, England

The Trooper, also popularly referred as The Troopie, is a Rhodesian statue and war memorial. It is located in the grounds of Hatfield House, home of the Marquess of Salisbury, in Hatfield, Hertfordshire, England. It was originally erected in Salisbury, Rhodesia and is dedicated to the Rhodesian Light Infantry (RLI) as their regimental statue.

== History ==
The statue was cast from 700 melted-down rifle cartridges. The statue was sculpted by Captain Michael Blackman of the Rhodesian Light Infantry and based on a photo of Trooper Wayne Hannekom. It was erected on 1 February 1979 in front of the entrance of Cranborne Barracks in Salisbury. It was unveiled by Lieutenant-Colonel Ian Bate at a ceremony involving the Rhodesian African Rifles band. At the dinner the day before the unveiling, the RLI's General John Hickman accused the Selous Scouts's Lieutenant-Colonel Ronald Reid-Daly of poaching ivory in the Zambezi Valley.

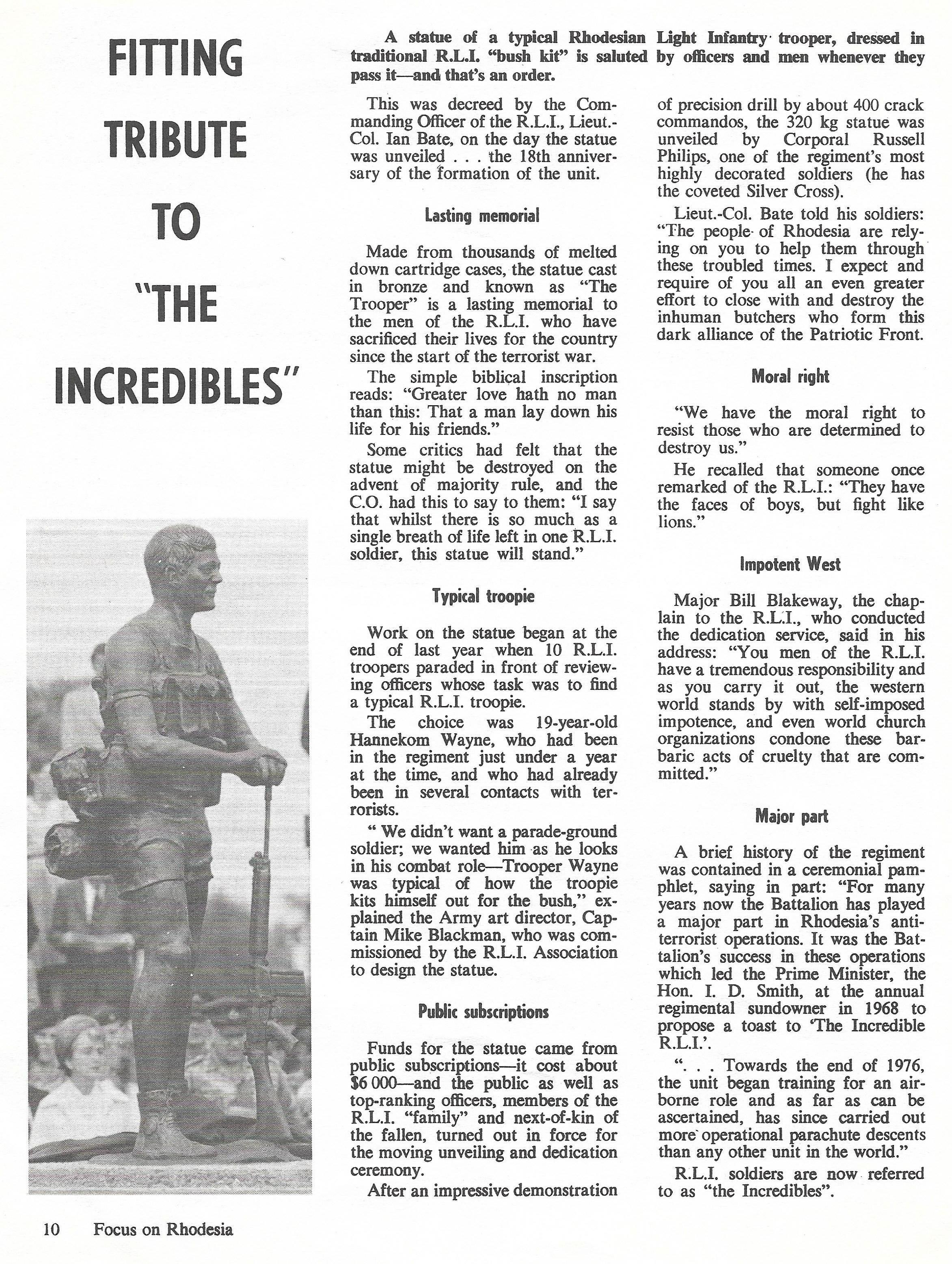

Following reports that the statue would be torn down after the establishment of Zimbabwe Rhodesia, Bate said that the statue would never be destroyed as long as an RLI soldier draws breath. Following the changes in political status which resulted in the establishment of Zimbabwe and the end of the Rhodesian Bush War, the statue was smuggled onto a South African Air Force plane, along with the regiment's records under orders of Lt-Colonel Charlie Aust, and flown to South Africa prior to the RLI's disbandment. It was placed on display at the South African National Museum of Military History in Johannesburg and later moved to the British Empire and Commonwealth Museum in Bristol. A replica of The Troopie remains on display in Johannesburg.

Later, the statue was installed in the grounds of Hatfield House in England on the river Lea and was rededicated by Robert Gascoyne-Cecil, 7th Marquess of Salisbury on 28 September 2008. The rededication included a new plaque stating, "In reconciliation and hope for future peace in Zimbabwe" alongside the RLI roll of honour.
