= Aust (surname) =

Aust is a surname. Notable people with the surname include:

- Abner M. Aust (1921–2020), American air force officer
- Charlie Aust (1942–2017), Rhodesian army officer
- Dennis Aust, (born 1940), American baseball player
- Kurt Aust (born 1955), Danish writer
- Otto Aust (1892–1943), Swedish sailor
- René Aust (born 1987), German politician
- Stefan Aust (born 1946), German journalist
