= Rhodesian Light Infantry =

1st Battalion, Rhodesian Light Infantry
- Emblem of the Rhodesian Light Infantry. The absence of the Queen's crown is evidence that this is the post-1970 pattern.
- Active: 1 February 1961 – 31 October 1980
- Disbanded: 31 October 1980
- Country: Rhodesia
- Branch: Regular Army
- Type: Commando
- Size: Battalion
- Part of: 2 Brigade
- Headquarters: Cranborne Barracks, Salisbury
- Nickname: The Saints The Incredibles
- Mottos: Various; none official (Note: The RLI had no official motto. Commonly used, but unofficial, mottoes were coined during its existence; perhaps the most well-known, "They have the faces of boys but they fight like lions", was created by Platoon Warrant Officer Herod of the Rhodesian African Rifles on 18 March 1968, and put forward as a possible motto by Captain Ronald Reid-Daly on 4 November 1969. "The Incredible Rhodesian Light Infantry", originally a toast to the regiment by Prime Minister Ian Smith on its seventh birthday, 1 February 1968, is an alternative, having given the RLI one of its nicknames, "The Incredibles". Finally, the words of Lieutenant-General Peter Walls on the 14th Regimental Day, 1 February 1975, are sometimes used; "Thank God for the Rhodesian Light Infantry". The Latin motto since adopted by The Rhodesian Light Infantry Regimental Association, Pugnamus Amo Leo, translates into English as "To Fight Like Lions".)
- Colours: Tartan Green and Silver White
- March: Quick: When the Saints Go Marching In; Slow: The Incredibles (Note: The Regiment's slow march was an original tune composed by Captain F. Sutton of the Rhodesian Corps of Signals Band for the presentation of the RLI colours on 19 June 1965. It was titled The Rhodesian Light Infantry, but following Ian Smith's toast to "The Incredible Rhodesian Light Infantry" on 1 February 1968, it was renamed The Incredibles at Sutton's request.)
- Mascot: Cheetah
- Anniversaries: 1 February 1961 (Note: Regimental Day, celebrating the anniversary of the RLI's formation on 1 February 1961); 11 November 1965 (Note: Triangular Night, commemorating the anniversary of the Unilateral Declaration of Independence on 11 November 1965)
- Engagements: Rhodesian Bush War: Operation Aztec; Operation Dingo
- Decorations: Freedom of the City of Salisbury; 25 July 1975

Commanders
- First CO: Lt-Col J. S. Salt (Note: Lt-Col John Stevenson Salt commanded the RLI from its formation on 1 February 1961 to 28 April 1963.)
- Final CO: Lt-Col J. C. W. Aust (Note: Lt-Col John Charles Wyatt Aust commanded the RLI from 4 December 1979 to its disbanding on 31 October 1980.)
- Notable commanders: Lt-Col G. P. Walls (Note: Lt-Col George Peter Walls commanded the RLI from 1 December 1964 to 19 June 1967, when he became Commander of 2 Brigade, of which the Regiment was a part. He was appointed Commander of the Rhodesian Army in 1972 and in 1977 became Commander of Combined Operations, which made him the highest-ranking military figure in the country.), Lt-Col J. C. W. Aust

The 1st Battalion, Rhodesian Light Infantry (1RLI), commonly The Rhodesian Light Infantry (RLI), was a regiment formed in 1961 at Brady Barracks (Bulawayo, Southern Rhodesia) as a light infantry unit within the army of the Federation of Rhodesia and Nyasaland. Barely a year after its creation, it was relocated to Cranborne Barracks (Salisbury) where its headquarters remained for the rest of its existence. The Regiment became part of the Southern Rhodesian Army when the Federation dissolved at the start of 1964 and, later that year, reformed into a commando battalion.

After Rhodesia's (Note: The name of the country equivalent to modern Zimbabwe changed numerous times during the history of the Rhodesian Light Infantry. When Northern Rhodesia achieved independence as Zambia in 1964, the colonial government of Southern Rhodesia passed legislation to drop "Southern" and become Rhodesia, but the UK did not ratify this. The government issued the Unilateral Declaration of Independence as Rhodesia and used that name until becoming Zimbabwe Rhodesia on 1 June 1979. When the country came under interim British control on 12 December 1979 it was Southern Rhodesia. The name Zimbabwe was adopted in April 1980.) Unilateral Declaration of Independence on 11 November 1965, the RLI became one of the country's main counter-insurgency units during the Rhodesian Bush War, which pitted the government's security forces against the rival guerrilla campaigns of Zimbabwe African National Liberation Army (ZANLA) and the Zimbabwe People's Revolutionary Army (ZIPRA).

An all-white regiment, the RLI was made up wholly of professional soldiers until 1973, when capable conscripted national servicemen were first introduced. Foreign volunteers from across the world, including many veterans of foreign conflicts, also joined and became a key part of the Regiment. The RLI was nicknamed "The Saints" or "The Incredibles."

So prominent were the airborne aspects of typical RLI operations that the battalion became a parachute regiment in 1976. The RLI served under the short-lived government of Zimbabwe Rhodesia in 1979, and the interim British government that followed. After serving under the new government of Zimbabwe for a brief period, the unit was disbanded in October 1980.

== Organisation ==
The RLI's Queen's Colours

The RLI's regimental colours, a wreath of flame lilies

=== Commandos ===
The regiment was assembled into a headquarters and four company-sized units called commandos: One, Two, Three and Support (each commando with ± 100 men). As a premise, a commando could have five troops, of which only four troops were normally activated. However, with the arrival of Intake 150 (in May 1976), the commandos were up to full strength for the first and only time. Some of the commandos mustered five troops until the end of 1976; with the university students demobbing at the end of 1976, the commandos reverted to four troops (in 2 Commando's case 9 Troop was deactivated). The troops in each commando relayed R&R consistently one at a time, which meant that the average fighting strength of a commando in bush mode was just over 70 men. Depending on the deployment and/or purpose, troops were divided into a small headquarters and either two 'patrols' or three 'sections'. Support Commando had a history dissimilar to all the other units and had been called Support Group for the era prior to 1976.

=== Base group ===
Battalion Headquarters – Front and Rear – was called Base Group after Support Group branched out from the original Headquarters Company. Base Group imparted logistical, operational and tactical support at the Front, through specialised sub-units, and organised administrative support (regimental policing, training, store keeping, record keeping and accounting, trucking, catering, nursing, etc.) at the Rear. A sizable portion of the administrative support was performed by detachments from various military services (Services Corps, Medical Corps, etc.) stationed at Cranborne Barracks.

==== Signals Troop and Tracking Troop ====
Signals Troop and Tracking Troop were specialised sub-units that interpolated into Support Group or Base Group and worked with all the Commandos. A high percentage of Signals Troop had served in one or more Commandos before being selected and trained (in-house) as communicators; they focused on front line communications in support of special operations and airborne forces. Others were trained by the Corps of Signals and provided essential services (exchange of classified information, etc.) for the Battalion. During the early planning stages for proposed changes to Support Group, it was accepted that Base Group was more suitable as the cynosure for all signals. The troop headquarters section was relocated to the RLI Joint Operations Command (JOC), and a team of specialist operators – properly cross-trained as proficient riflemen for combat duties – was attached to and deployed with each of the Commandos. So Signals Troop was scattered but still functioned as the vital organ that connected all the detachments in the combined operations network.

Tracking Troop was also sedulous and operated out of Base Group in the same manner as Signals Troop; a number of specialist trackers would be attached to a Commando as/when required to be dropped onto spoor for follow-up work. The new Selous Scouts Regiment had requested some specialist trackers for a combative tracking unit, so Tracking Troop was disbanded and a distinct home found for everyone concerned – primarily within the Selous Scouts unit and RLI, but also the SAS (Rhodesian Special Air Service). The majority were transmigrated to Support Group where they eventually became known as Reconnaissance Troop after the change to a Commando was actualised.

=== Support Group/Commando ===
Support Commando had been called Support Group and came from the original Headquarters Company; consequently, they had some additional skills and resources.

Support Commando had a Headquarters and four cross-trained Troops: Mortar, Assault Pioneer, Anti-Tank and Reconnaissance, so every commando was a similar size (4 troops). The troops were not renamed because they maintained their capacity to provide the battalion with supporting fire and specialised resources in both conventional warfare and counter insurgency operations. During most counter-insurgency operations Support Commando fulfilled the same role as all the other commandos, which was enough to justify the change from being called Support Group.

Mortar Troop was equipped with 81mm mortars and consisted of a headquarters section and three purposeful sections (two mortars per section). Assault Pioneer Troop provided the Battalion with combat engineering capabilities through a headquarters section and three purposeful sections. Anti-Tank Troop was equipped with six 106mm recoilless rifles, and also consisted of a headquarters section and three purposeful sections (two anti-tank weapons per section, each mounted on a modified Rodef 2.5). The remnants of Tracking Troop, with additional resources for reconnoitering, were the basis for the fourth troop: Reconnaissance Troop.

== Ranks ==
The RLI was a fledgling unit when operations started, and it needed to grow and mature; albeit a very prominent unit in the permanent forces, its size did not warrant a full Colonel. Sometimes the Officer Commanding a Commando/Group was a Captain. The ranks above Colour (Staff) Sergeant were addressed as "Sir" by the subordinate ranks. The Officers would refer to a CSM (WO2) as "Sergeant Major" and the RSM (WO1) as "R-S-M". All ranks tended to be called "troopies" by the Rhodesian media.

== Operations ==
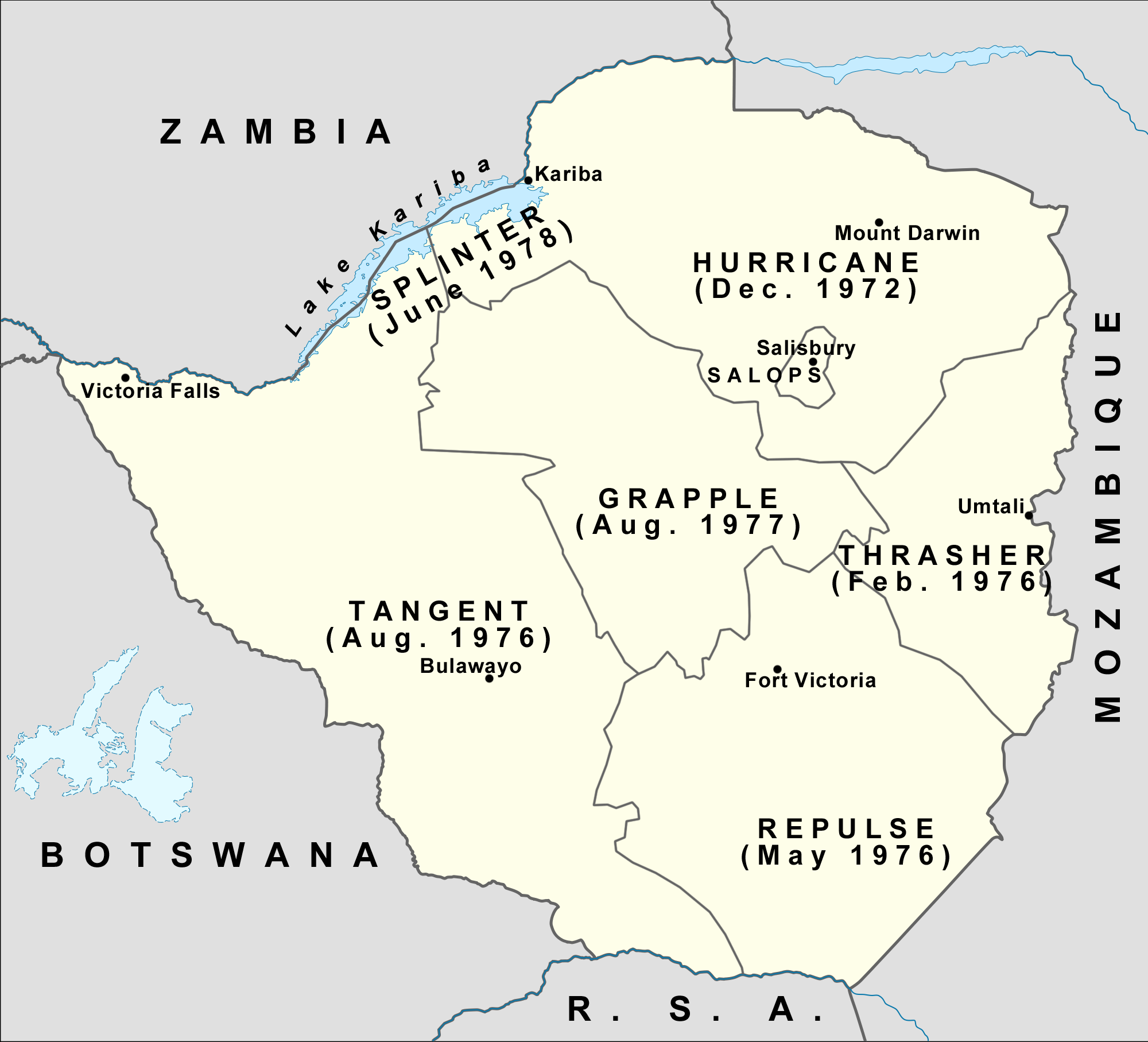
Operational areas of the Rhodesian Security Forces during the Bush War.

The RLI was at the forefront of the Rhodesian Bush War, a conflict between the internationally unrecognised government, made up mostly of the country's minority whites, and communist guerrillas attempting to overthrow it and introduce majority rule. The Bush War had started in earnest on 21 December 1972, when Zimbabwe African National Liberation Army (ZANLA) insurgents attacked Altena and Whistlefield Farms near the north-eastern town of Centenary, and lasted until the Lancaster House Agreement of 1979. The country became known as Zimbabwe the following year.

== Fireforce actions ==
The RLI's characteristic deployment was the Fireforce rapid response operation, first created at Mount Darwin and then tested at Centenary in June 1974. This was an operational assault or reaction composed of a first wave of 32 soldiers (as a rule) carried to the scene by three helicopters and one DC-3 Dakota, called "Dak", with a command/gun helicopter and a light attack aircraft in support. The latter was a Cessna Skymaster, armed with two roof mounted .303 Browning machine-guns and normally two 37 mm SNEB rocket pods and/or two small napalm bombs called Frantans, and/or two mini-Golf bombs which were manufactured in Rhodesia. The RLI became extremely adept at the execution of this very technical type of military operation.

A Commando would be based at an airfield with usually four helicopters, one DC-3 Dakota and the Cessna (known as the "Lynx"). One of these helicopters was equipped with a MG 151/20 20mm cannon and seating arrangement for the mastermind of the engagement, usually the officer commanding of the Commando. This helicopter was called the K-car (Note: The term "K-car" originated as an abbreviation of "killer car".) with a crew of three consisting of the pilot, a technician (gunner), and the fireforce commander. The other helicopters used in each call-out, known as G-cars, were typically Alouette Mk IIIs, though in 1979 a few Bell UH-1s were used.

The G-cars (Note: The word "G-car" comes from "gunship".) were armed with fully automatic weapons (the original FN MAG was replaced by twin Browning .303 machine-guns) and each carried one Stop – the stick leader, a machine-gunner and two riflemen – along with the pilot and his technician, who also operated the helicopter's machine-gun(s). The carrying capacity of the G-car dictated the combat organisation of the Commando: Stop-1 was assigned to the first G-car, Stop-2 to the second, and Stop-3 to the third. Stop-4 to Stop-8 were paratroopers in the Dakota.

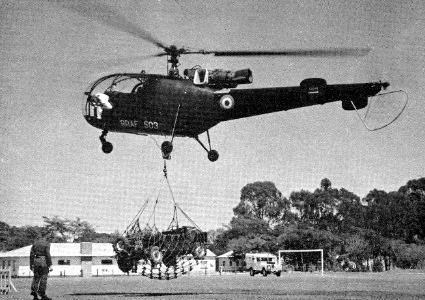
One of the Alouette III helicopters acquired by the Royal Rhodesian Air Force in 1962. The RLI used these helicopters for its Fireforce operations.

In more detail, each Stop of four soldiers (called a "Stick") had: (Note: From a "stick" of paratroopers) one leader with a FN FAL and 100 rounds (also a VHF radio to communicate); one machine-gunner with a FN MAG and 400 rounds; and two riflemen, each with a FN FAL and 100 rounds (plus hand-grenades, rifle-grenades and medical supplies). All the rounds were 7.62 × 51 mm NATO. From early 1979 onward, a radio was also issued to one of the riflemen. The Dakota carried five stops of paratroopers, two on the port side and three on the starboard side. Apart from the parachutes, paratroopers equipment was tantamount to heliborne-troopers equipment; but the paratroopers had other problems akin to jumping. Every machine-gunner had to jump with his weapon strapped to his side.

Together the eight stops, 32 men in total, were described as the "First Wave". Each Fireforce took charge of huge swathes of the country (many thousands of square miles). Inherently there were only three permanent Fireforce bases. Any sighting of the enemy was reported and a siren sounded at the most convenient base. The First Wave of heliborne-troopers, already in a state of alacrity, would grab their weapon and webbing (and everything else that they needed) while rushing to the helicopters. At the same time, the paratroopers would run to a designated place where their equipment was kept ready, and dispatchers (usually assisted by off-duty comrades) would help them kit out.

Normally the Second Wave, called the Landtail, rushed to trucks, although if "jousting" or the "scene" was nearby they would wait at the airfield to be picked up by the helicopters after the First Wave had been deployed. Soldiers alternated as Heliborne troopers, Paratroopers, Landtail, and Off-duty throughout the Bush Trip. The Landtail was often an important factor as they helped with refueling the helicopters and recovering the deceased enemy (and their weapons), the parachutes and other equipment.

Sometimes a smaller Third Wave had to prepare if numbers permitted; but quite often, only the First Wave was engaged in shooting. In general, most soldiers preferred to be in the Heliborne First Wave and, although the number of operational parachute jumps was truly remarkable, the majority of soldiers were carried into action by helicopter.

The most important factors, apart from the reaction of the enemy and the terrain, in a Fireforce operation were the reliability of intelligence and the skill of the operations commander. The majority of successful engagements were enabled by the skills of the Selous Scouts (many of whom were former enemy); they had the capacity to insert observation posts into the bush without being noticed by the inhabitants. The difficulty of commanding the scene was extreme and good Fireforce commanders were highly prized by the men.

Any advance warning for the enemy of the approaching helicopters, and the anticipated reactions caused by surprise and confusion, were decisive factors in the coming engagement. Wind direction/speed, the presence of a tree covered ridge-line, or a multitude of other factors could make the difference between life or death. If the enemy was trapped in adverse terrain, such as a simple village surrounded by open ground, normally no-one escaped unless it was near nightfall.

== Other actions ==
In addition to Fireforce, the four Commandos were often used as special forces in patrolling actions, mostly inside Rhodesia, but sometimes inside Zambia and Mozambique. During these operations troops were required to carry well over 100 lb (45 kg) of equipment for five to ten days on patrol. Upon their return to base for re-supply, they were often required to turnaround and patrol again in short order.

Attacks were also carried out on enemy camps within Zambia (in the case of ZIPRA) and Mozambique (against ZANLA); these attacks usually involved two or more Commandos. The Rhodesian Special Air Service, used almost exclusively for external operations, often accompanied the Rhodesian Light Infantry on these operations, as did the Selous Scouts.

=== Patrols ===
Most of the Rhodesian Light Infantry's patrol operations took place in Rhodesia, though some patrols occurred in Zambia and Mozambique. Patrolling bush trips were unpopular with the troops due to the arduous nature of the duty and the comparative lack of action to Fireforce operations. A Commando could be more exhausted from a patrolling bush trip than the most intense Fireforce period, even if the unit saw more combat in the latter.

However the nature of patrolling work greatly expanded the minds of the troops. Patrols varied from travelling by day and setting up ambushes at night, to observation post work, where a position was occupied to observe the locality. Extreme precautions were made to be clandestine on these observation posts, though it was suspected that the locals were often aware of the Observation Post's presence.

Regardless the type of patrol, a night march would normally be made to the area. Conditions could make this task most difficult, especially when it was so dark that the troopies were completely blind. Scarcity of water could present an issue to the patrol. The civilians were not regarded as hostiles by the troops. There were numerous occasions when they helped each other and process of great empathy took place. If a patrol learned of enemy presence the patrol force immediately moved to engage the enemy. On occasions the patrols were ambushed. Patrols in Mozambique were considered the most hazardous, due to the violent reaction of FRELIMO (also known as FPML).

=== Externals ===
The RLI carried out external assaults on guerrilla bases in Zambia (against ZIPRA) and Mozambique (against ZANLA); there were many of these, and also one in Botswana. The larger raids combined Fireforce teams and were similarly executed, save for the greater scale of planning and logistics. There were also several raids by individual Commandos where the presence of FRELIMO units led to greater resistance. Just like in a regular Fireforce operation, the element of surprise was most important.

Canberra and Hunter jets would bomb the target just before the Commandos arrived; and outcomes could be out of all reason, from total "lemons" to the most successful days in the Battalion's history. For example, when three Commandos of the Battalion participated in an attack on ZIPRA camps in Zambia in October 1978, there were no enemy casualties.

November 1977's Operation Dingo, a joint attack by the RLI and Rhodesian SAS on ZANLA camps in Mozambique at Chimoio and Tembue, is retrospectively described by Squadron Leader P. J. H. Petter-Bowyer as an "astounding success". "Operation Dingo cost ZANLA in excess of 3,000 trained men and something in the order of 5,000 wounded, many too seriously to be of further use," he writes. "Others lost all interest in the fighting and deserted." From the Rhodesian side, six men were wounded and two were killed.

The stop of four was used in these raids (though they were organised into larger entities). The plans for these raids varied from sudden and fairly simple operations (subject to change on the fly) to highly intricate.

== Armaments ==
Battle rifles of the Rhodesian Light Infantry

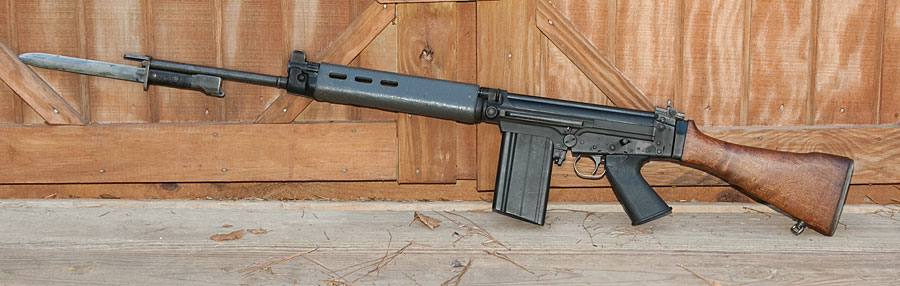
An FN FAL battle rifle with bayonet fixed

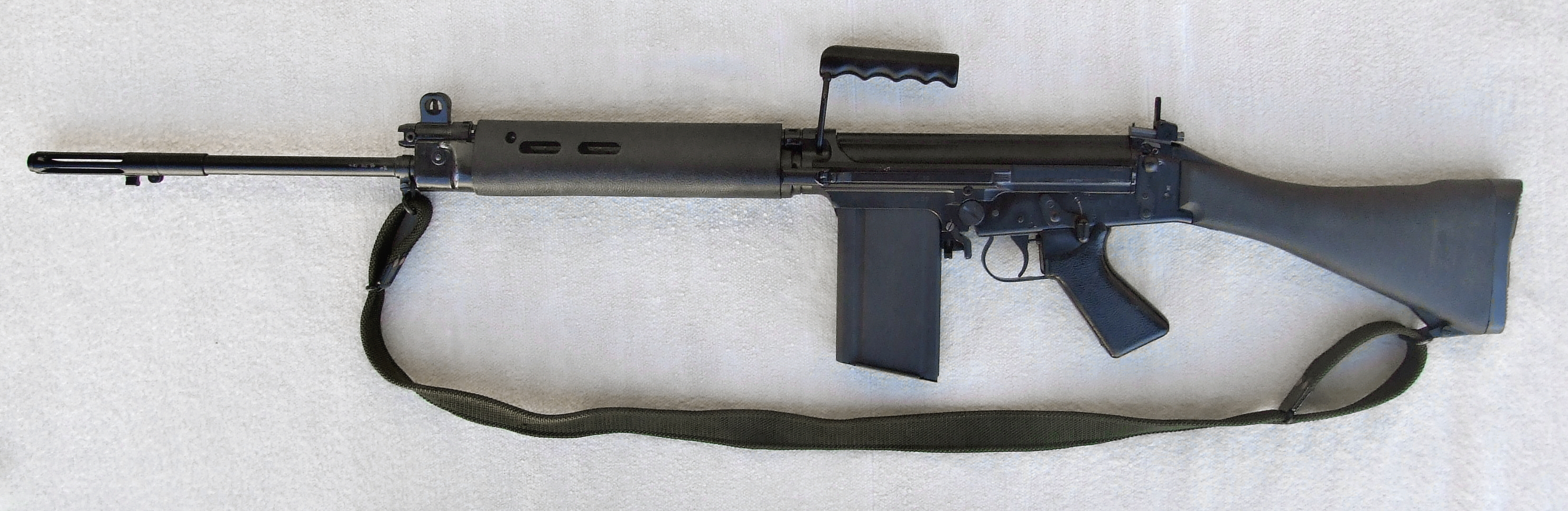
A British-made L1A1 SLR

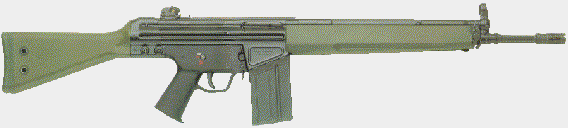
A Heckler & Koch G3A3 rifle

Riflemen were equipped with a 7.62×51mm NATO battle rifle, preferring the Belgian FN FAL or its variants: the British-made L1A1 Self-Loading Rifle (L1A1 SLR) and the South African R1. The Heckler & Koch G3A3, with its origins in West Germany, was also an option. All RLI members were armed with FN FALs by 1968.

The primary infantry support weapon was the 7.62×51mm belt-fed FN MAG. Soldiers also carried a variety of hand grenades including high-explosive (HE), white-phosphorus (WP), and colored smoke. To prevent accidental ignition of a grenade, the safety levers which upon release activated the fuse of the grenade, were taped down. Soldiers were issued HE and WP rifle grenades as well as anti-tank grenades or rockets. Sometimes "bunker bombs" were carried. Machine-gunners and some riflemen carried sidearms.

The 7.62×51mm round fired by the FAL and the MAG had a significant range advantage compared to the 7.62×39mm round fired by the AK-47, SKS, RPD, and RPK firearms normally carried by the ZANLA and ZIPRA forces. The 7.62×51mm NATO round has been proven effective out to 800 meters, whereas the 7.62×39mm is considered less effective (out to ± 400 meters). This disparity in effectiveness, combined with the higher training standards and experiences of the RLI, would probably be a decisive factor in engagements when the RLI forces could fire upon the enemy from a distance (less dangerous return fire). Still, the RLI favoured being close to the enemy.

Issued webbing was not used much which led to a bewildering array of webbing/packs. Often the stops stayed the night at a Fireforce scene and sometimes patrolled the area the next day, other times these operations led into the night and through the following day. On direct action missions, additional ammunition was issued to all soldiers for their personal weapons as well as for squad weapons such as mortars and machine-guns. Bergens with rations (water, batteries for the squad radio, etc.) were carried on patrols.

Riflemen were required to carry a panga, which could be used to chop down bush to create a landing zone so that helicopters could extract them. Strangely, some riflemen tried not to carry this piece of equipment, while some gunners and stop commanders (also known as stick leaders and whose rank varied from Trooper to Captain) did carry them. Only the Stop Commanders carried mini-flares. These devices were about the size and shape of a large pencil, which were used to signal positions, though never at night, and were popular with the troops. The parachute harnesses were Saviac Mk1s, of U.S. manufacture. They were extremely reliable with a reserve parachute on the chest. The parachutes were overhead static line.

From 1977 onwards the RLI was forbidden to wear shorts on operations, due to the dangerous visibility of the soldiers' white legs. This rule was strictly adhered to, but a rule which required troops to wear ankle-boots when in para-stops was often broken. The number of parachute injuries on ops was insignificant, despite (or perhaps, because of) around half of landings falling into trees. Sometimes they fell onto boulders or buildings or fences or boggy ground. Fields varied from as hard as concrete to soil so dry and diffuse that it swallowed them up. Extremely fast "ground rush" was frequently experienced, due to taking place on the sides or top of great hills.

Confusingly the stops in the Dak were dropped in "sticks", supposedly noted in entries in the parachute log books held by troops – which were filled in by themselves – as other data pertinent to the jump. This resulted in the log books often being filled with false data. The port side of the Dak was much preferable than the starboard. There were many times when exiting from G-cars was extremely dangerous due to not being able to descend close enough (because of trees, etc.). The stick then had to carefully clamber out and hold on to the side-step before jumping from a greater height, all while a mass of leaves and twigs whirled about inside the helicopter causing much more stress for the pilot and his technician. Alouettes were extremely reliable and much more capable of dropping off stops in rough terrain, although they had a tendency to sway a little as the troops jumped out, but the Bells had more carrying capacity, range and speed.

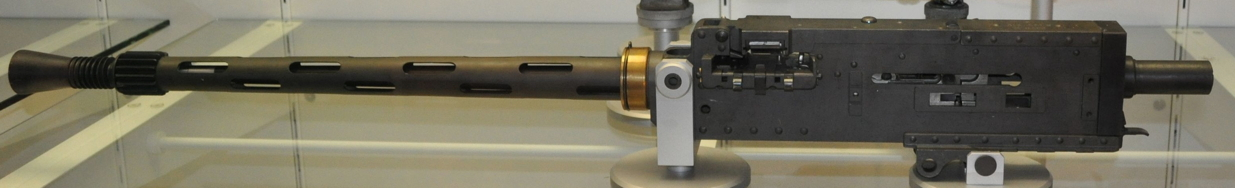
A Browning .303 Mk II machine-gun, as equipped to K-cars and G-cars on Fireforce.

Both these vehicles were armed with twin-Browning M1919 machine-guns chambered in .303 British, which were never indiscriminately fired by the tech. The K-car Gunners had to be careful, for there was always a shortage of 20mm rounds and there were many times when troops were only yards away from the target. K-cars with four Browning .303 machine-guns (instead of the 20mm cannon) were not popular with the troops, as they were less effective. The numbers of the enemy killed by the K-car in a scene varied from zero to all (and are included in the estimate for those killed). On some Fireforce operations Hunter jets were used, and more rarely, Vampires.

Up to the second quarter of 1979, troops were required to collect and remove all deceased persons from the scene. This rule was very strictly adhered to, even if it reduced in the short term the effectiveness of the Fireforce (due to the immense effort of it). The plight of the civilians was most profoundly realised by the troops.

== Casualties ==
The Rhodesian Light Infantry Regimental Association maintains a Roll of Honour which lists 85 men killed in action from March 1968 to December 1979. A further 15 are listed as having died on operations from September 1961 to December 1979. Another 34 are listed as deceased from other causes, from 1961 to December 1979.

Of the 85 killed in action, 66 occurred in the last four years of the war, thirty-one in 1979 alone. These figures mirror fairly accurately the ratio of combat the Battalion was in. The number of wounded is not known. It is known that in one of the Commandos there were more than 50 wounded in action in a two-year period where it had 21 killed in action. There were of course many other casualties, from accidents and illness/disease, or bad landings on jumps.

These figures are very low for a battalion that was involved in so much combat, though it must be remembered that the Commandos were both smaller than the companies of the average strength infantry battalion of modern warfare and fighting with modern weapons and tactics against a relatively untrained, though well equipped, foe.

United States Army Lt-Col Dave Grossman wrote:

Rhodesia's army during the 1970s was one of the best trained in the world, going up against a very poorly trained but well-equipped insurgent force. The security forces in Rhodesia maintained an overall kill ratio of about eight-to-one in their favour throughout the guerrilla war. And the highly trained Rhodesian Light Infantry achieved kill ratios ranging from 35-to-one to 50-to-one. The Rhodesians achieved this in an environment where they did not have close air and artillery support ... nor did they have any significant advantage over their Soviet-supported opponents. The only thing they had going for them was their superior training, and the advantage this gave them added up to nothing less than total tactical superiority.

== Disbandment ==
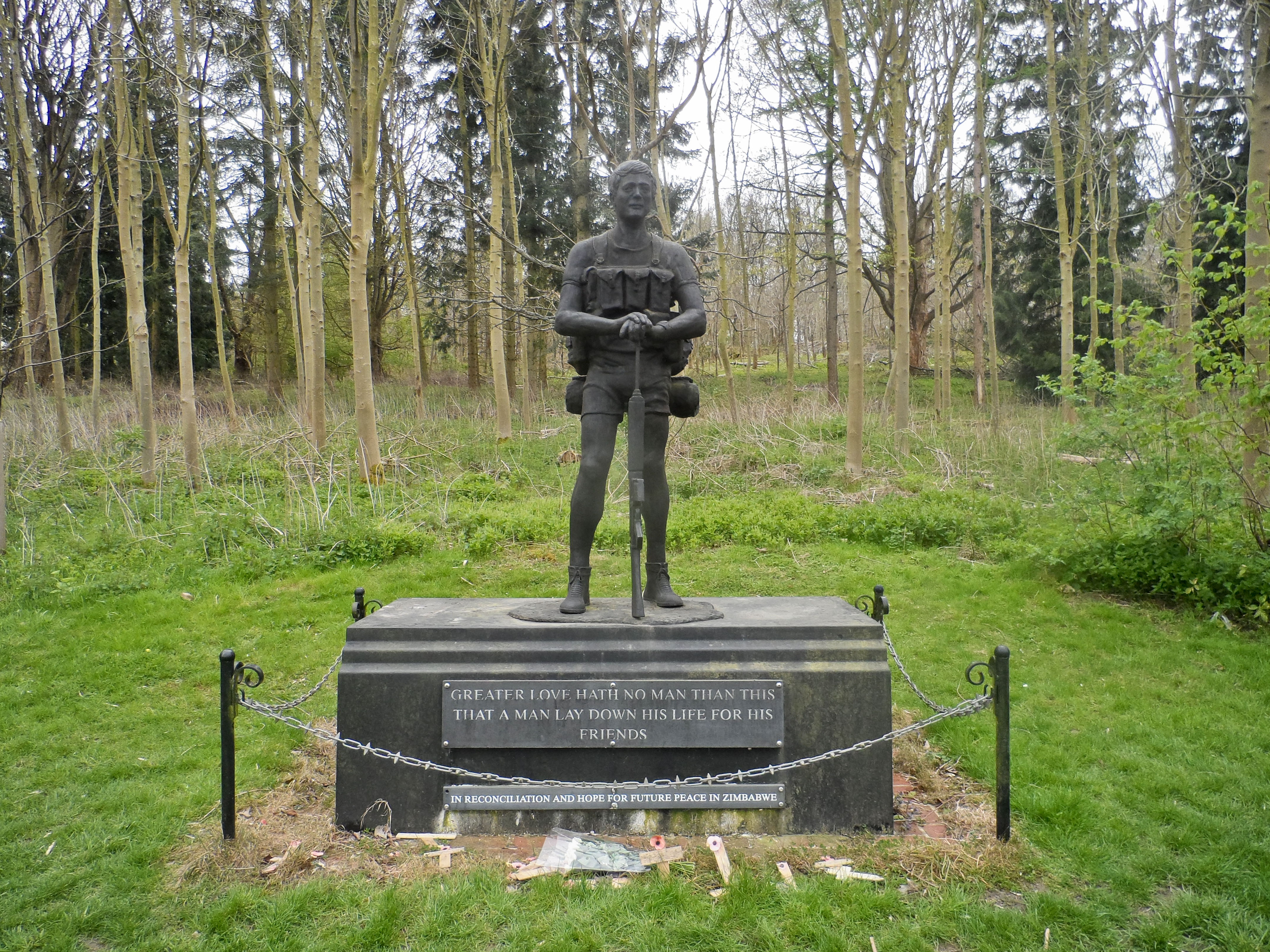
The Troopie, the RLI's regimental statue, on the grounds of Hatfield House in England in 2014

Following the creation and independence of the Republic of Zimbabwe (April 1980), the ultimate military parade of the RLI, for the ceremonial laying-up of its regimental colours, took place at Cranborne Barracks on 17 October 1980. The unit's last commanding officer, J. C. W. Aust, recalled being "amazed" by the large crowd of allegiant spectators surrounding the parade square, including the former government minister P. K. van der Byl who attended unannounced. A Rhodesian Air Force Alouette III helicopter unexpectedly arrived overhead, during the final ceremony, in Aust's words "...circling, in a moving salute and farewell". On 31 October, the Rhodesian Light Infantry was disbanded. A nucleus of RLI officers and other personnel (instructors) became involved in training and helping to form the First Zimbabwe Commando Battalion of the Zimbabwe National Army.

== Legacy ==
The RLI regimental statue, "The Trooper" (or "The Troopie") left Zimbabwe on 28 July 1980 on a South African Air Force C-130 Hercules, together with the regiment's documents/records, trophies and other paraphernalia. By arrangement, everything was put into storage at the South African National Museum of Military History in Johannesburg and later moved to the British Empire and Commonwealth Museum in Bristol, England. "The Trooper" statue now stands in the grounds of Hatfield House, country seat of the Marquess of Salisbury, where it was re-dedicated on 28 September 2008. A copy of the statue remains on display in Johannesburg.

Many RLI veterans wrote memoirs about their service after the Bush War. Rhodesian veterans' memoirs from across the entire army express varied views of the RLI, with some arguing that it was among the best units of the security forces, while others expressed that its members were incompetent and frequently abused drugs.

== Notes and references ==
=== Bibliography ===
- Abbott, Peter; Botham, Philip (June 1986). Modern African Wars: Rhodesia, 1965–80. Oxford: Osprey Publishing. ISBN 978-0-85045-728-5.
- Binda, Alexandre (May 2008). The Saints: The Rhodesian Light Infantry. Johannesburg: 30° South Publishers. ISBN 978-1-920143-07-7.
- Bond, Geoffrey (1977). The Incredibles: The Story of the 1st Battalion, The Rhodesian Light Infantry. Salisbury: Sarum Imprint. ISBN 0-7974-0233-0.
- Cilliers, Jackie (December 1984). Counter-Insurgency in Rhodesia. London, Sydney & Dover, New Hampshire: Croom Helm. ISBN 978-0-7099-3412-7.
- Cocks, Chris (April 2006) [1988]. Fireforce: One Man's War in the Rhodesian Light Infantry (Fourth ed.). Johannesburg: 30° South Publishers. ISBN 978-0-9584890-9-6.
- Croukamp, Dennis E. W. (December 2005). Only My Friends Call Me "Crouks": Rhodesian reconnaissance specialist. Cape Town: Pseudo Publishing. ISBN 978-0-620-29392-1.
- Grossman, Lt-Col Dave (November 1996). On Killing: The Psychological Cost of Learning to Kill in War and Society. New York: Back Bay Books. ISBN 0-316-33000-0.
- Moorcraft, Paul L.; McLaughlin, Peter (April 2008) [1982]. The Rhodesian War: A Military History. Barnsley: Pen and Sword Books. ISBN 978-1-84415-694-8.
- Palley, Claire (1966). The constitutional history and law of Southern Rhodesia 1888–1965, with special reference to Imperial control (First ed.). Oxford: Clarendon Press. ASIN B0000CMYXJ.
- Petter-Bowyer, P. J. H. (November 2005) [2003]. Winds of Destruction: the Autobiography of a Rhodesian Combat Pilot. Johannesburg: 30° South Publishers. ISBN 978-0-9584890-3-4.
- Preston, Matthew (September 2004). Ending civil war: Rhodesia and Lebanon in perspective. London: I.B. Tauris. ISBN 1-85043-579-0.
- Smith, Ian (June 1997). The Great Betrayal: The Memoirs of Ian Douglas Smith. London: John Blake Publishing. ISBN 1-85782-176-9.
- Streak, Brian (31 October 1980). The Cheetah: Magazine of the RLI. Salisbury: The Rhodesian Light Infantry Regimental Association. ASIN B00E0JU0E8.
- Wessels, Hannes (July 2010). P. K. van der Byl: African Statesman. Johannesburg: 30° South Publishers. ISBN 978-1-920143-49-7.
- White, Luise (2021). Fighting and Writing: The Rhodesian Army at War and Postwar (online ed.). Durham: Duke University Press. ISBN 978-1-4780-2128-5.
- Wood, J. R. T. (June 2005). So far and no further! Rhodesia's bid for independence during the retreat from empire 1959–1965. Victoria: Trafford Publishing. ISBN 978-1-4120-4952-8.
- Wood, J. R. T. (April 2008). A matter of weeks rather than months: The Impasse between Harold Wilson and Ian Smith: Sanctions, Aborted Settlements and War 1965–1969. Victoria: Trafford Publishing. ISBN 978-1-4251-4807-2.
- Wood, J. R. T. (July 2009). Counter-strike From the Sky: The Rhodesian All-arms Fireforce in the War in the Bush 1974–1980. Johannesburg: 30° South Publishers. ISBN 978-1-920143-33-6.
