= Shackle code =

Cryptographic system for numbers

A shackle code is a cryptographic system used in radio communications on the battle field by the US military, the Rhodesian Army, and the Canadian Army, among other English speaking militaries which might not distribute or require sophisticated one-time use pads. It is specialized for the transmission of numerals. Each of the letters of the English alphabet was assigned a numeric value. A number could have several letters assigned. The assignation was changed frequently and required the distribution of the codes to each party in advance. When a party wanted to communicate a number, it radioed "SHACKLE" and it spelled out each digit (or combination of digits) using a word starting with the letter. The end of the number was marked by the word "UNSHACKLE".

As an example, suppose the codeword was BLACKHORSE, which has no repeating letters. The starting letter would be expressed as BLACKHORSE4, so the 4th letter would be used for 1 and so on - 1,2,3,4 would be transmitted as C,K,H,O.

== Alternatives ==
During World War II, the shackle codes took time to encode and decode, so during battle, sometimes troops radioed English plaintext with profanity. Navajo code talkers were also used as an alternative.

== See also ==
- One-time pad
- Trench code
