= Rhodesian Special Air Service =

Rhodesian special forces unit

- Flaming sword symbol of the SAS
- Active: 1951 – 1953, 1961 – December 31, 1980
- Country: Rhodesia
- Allegiance: British Empire (until 1965); Rhodesia (1965–70); Republic of Rhodesia (1970–79); Zimbabwe Rhodesia (1979)
- Branch: Rhodesian Army
- Type: Special forces
- Motto: Who Dares Wins
- Colours: Beige
- Engagements: Malayan Emergency; Aden Emergency; Rhodesian Bush War

The Rhodesian Special Air Service or Rhodesian SAS was a special forces unit of the Rhodesian Army. It comprised:

- C Squadron, Special Air Service Regiment (Malayan Emergency, 1951–1953)
- "C" Squadron (Rhodesian) Special Air Service (1961–1978)
- 1 (Rhodesian) Special Air Service Regiment (1978–1980)

C Squadron, SAS Regiment was formed during the Malayan Emergency by volunteers from Rhodesia. It was disbanded in 1953 and became the nucleus of "C" Squadron (Rhodesian) Special Air Service, operational from 1961. In June 1978 "C" Squadron (Rhodesian) Special Air Service became 1 (Rhodesian) Special Air Service Regiment until Rhodesia became Zimbabwe in 1980.

== Formation ==
During the Malayan Emergency (1951–1953), a group of men from Southern Rhodesia volunteered to go to Malaya and were initially known as "The Far East Volunteer Group" later to become the Malayan Scouts. While in Malaya, they were renamed as "C" Squadron (Malayan Scouts). When British 22 SAS was officially named as British unit at the end of 1951, with its "A", "B" Squadrons, the Rhodesian contingent was renamed C (Rhodesia) Squadron 22 SAS. When "C" Squadron concluded their tour of duty in March 1953, they came back to Southern Rhodesia and the unit was disbanded.

== Re-formation in Rhodesia ==
The formation of the Rhodesian SAS goes back to November 1959 when it was decided in the Federal Assembly to form a Parachute Evaluation Detachment to examine the practicalities of military parachuting and parachute training in the Federation of Rhodesia and Nyasaland, with a view to the possible formation of an airborne unit. This was announced by the then Federal Minister of Defence John Moore Caldicott, but it was Sir Roy Welensky who was the reported driving force behind the reforming of what was to become the SAS.

In 1960 a detachment of RAF arrived under Squadron Leader E. Minter to conduct the training of the Parachute Evaluation Detachment (PED). By March 1960, the PED was complete and those on the course were presented their wings by the said Minister of Defence. The "experiment" was a complete success and in July decided to form a regular European SAS Squadron. In late 1960, No 1 Training Unit was formed, and once assembled and trained they would form the nucleus of what was to become the Rhodesian Light Infantry (RLI) and "C" Squadron SAS.

In early 1961 six volunteers from the Air Force were sent to RAF Abingdon in England for parachute instructor training and a further group of volunteer officers and NCOs to complete a selection course with the SAS in Britain. On their return, they called for volunteers from No. 1 Training Unit and in August 1961 the first of many selection courses was run in the Matopos just outside Bulawayo. No 1 basic training course completed their training in November and were presented their wings by Sir Malcolm Barrow, and then Deputy Prime Minister.

In late 1961 the SAS were moved to Ndola Barracks, Ndola in Northern Rhodesia along with the Selous Scouts Armoured Car Regiment. By July the following year, No 9 basic course received their wings from the Federal Prime Minister himself, Sir Roy Welensky. In August 1962, the Unit had sufficient men to become operational and became known as "C" Squadron (Rhodesian) Special Air Service.

With the breakup of the Federation of Rhodesia and Nyasaland at the end of December 1963, the Squadron was virtually destroyed when members were offered either a "golden handshake" or to return with unit to Southern Rhodesia. The unit, at the point of the federal dissolution, consisted of 193 men. Only thirty-one men returned to reform the SAS. Of the rest, some returned to their original units, others joined the new Zambian Army, some joined Mike Hoare in the Congo and many others returned to civilian life. The new commanding officer became Major Dudley Coventry. The unit was relocated to Cranborne Barracks in Salisbury. The initial years after the break-up found the unit having difficulty in attracting recruits. This was largely due to the high standards required of an SAS soldier and also due to the "ill feeling" between the SAS and the RLI (from where most of the recruits should have been selected).

Nevertheless, both the SAS and the RLI played crucial roles in the domestic clandestine operation, counterinsurgency, and special operations effort during the Rhodesian Bush War. The SAS and the Selous Scouts were the principal special forces units used in external operations. In terms of some of the most important of the external operations, the SAS and RLI both participated in Operation Dingo, in November 1977, which was one of the most successful operations conducted during the war, where more than 3,000 ZANLA fighters were killed and 5,000 wounded.

The numbers of men in the SAS went up to approximately 250 when in June 1978 "C" Squadron (Rhodesian) Special Air Service became 1 (Rhodesian) Special Air Service Regiment. The unit moved to their new barracks called "Kabrit" in 1979. The regiment was retained following the transition to black majority rule on 31 December 1980 as Rhodesia became Zimbabwe, though many of its personnel were recruited into the South African Defence Force and moved to South Africa.

"D" Squadron was the "cover" name given to the South African Special Forces (Recces), Alpha Group from 1 Reconnaissance Commando (1 RC) & Bravo Group from 5 Reconnaissance Commando (5 RC) who worked alongside "C" Squadron SAS in the South-East corner of Rhodesia and Gaza Province, of Mozambique both separately and jointly from late 1977 – June 1978. South African personnel were also deployed with Rhodesian SAS on Operation Splinter on Lake Kariba, in 1978.

== See also ==
- Peter McAleese
- Fireforce
- Long Range Desert Group
- Special forces of Rhodesia
