= Charlie Aust =

Rhodesian military commander

Lieutenant Colonel John Charles Wyatt Aust MLM
- Aust at the RLI's final parade in 1980
- Born: 1942; Enkeldoorn, Southern Rhodesia
- Died: 15 November 2017 (aged 74–75); England
- Military career
- Allegiance: Rhodesia and Nyasaland; Rhodesia
- Service: Rhodesian Army
- Service years: 1961–1980
- Rank: Lieutenant Colonel
- Nickname: Charlie Aust
- Unit: Rhodesian Light Infantry
- Commands: Rhodesian Light Infantry
- Conflicts: Rhodesian Bush War
- Awards: Legion of Merit MLM

Lieutenant Colonel John Charles Wyatt Aust MLM, commonly known as Charlie Aust (1942 – 15 November 2017) was a Rhodesian military commander. He was born in Enkeldoorn, Southern Rhodesia and was the last commanding officer of the Rhodesian Light Infantry (RLI).

== Background ==
Aust's family came from the original Rhodesian pioneers of the British South Africa Company. His maternal grandfather died as a part of Allan Wilson's Shangani Patrol. His paternal grandfather farmed in Matabeleland. His father was a British South Africa Police (BSAP) officer and Aust spent most of his early life moving around various rural BSAP stations. Aust attended Rhodes Estate Preparatory School and Plumtree School.

== Military career ==
Aust joined the Federal Army of Rhodesia and Nyasaland in 1961 as a part of his National Service where he was selected for officer training. Aust elected to take the training in Rhodesia rather than going to the British Army's Royal Military College Sandhurst. Upon passing out, he was commissioned into the Rhodesian African Rifles (RAR) in 1962. He served there for three years before teaching as a training lieutenant at the School of Infantry in Gwelo. After three years, he joined the General Staff at HQ2 in Salisbury before joining the RLI as a Commando Commander. He was appointed as a Member of the Legion of Merit in the Military division for his role in assisting the RLI to adopt fireforce tactics.

In 1975, he joined the Joint Planning Staff for two years before returning to the RLI as second-in-command. On 4 December 1979, he became the last commanding officer of the RLI. This was shortly after Zimbabwe Rhodesia had returned to British control as Southern Rhodesia ahead of elections. On his first day, he published a memo for all RLI soldiers in casual terms introducing his expectations and describing himself as having a "Seedy moustache, glasses and intensely ugly" so they knew how to identify him as their commanding officer. In July 1980 following Southern Rhodesia becoming independent as Zimbabwe, Aust was informed that the RLI were going to be disbanded. He arranged a quick parade and planned the evacuation of the RLI's regimental statue The Troopie and other RLI regimental memorabilia from Zimbabwe to South Africa. Aust oversaw the RLI's final parade on 31 October 1980. He took the RLI's Regimental Colours and laid them up before the Padre.

=== Awards ===
- Legion of Merit (Military) (MLM) (Rhodesia)

== Later life ==
After the dissolution of the RLI, Aust briefly moved to South Africa, but returned a year later to take over the family farm in Essexvale. However he eventually had to leave Zimbabwe in 2001 due to his farm being forcibly taken during the Robert Mugabe-authorised violent land seizure. Using his British passport that he had since he was a child, he escaped to the United Kingdom. Aust died on 15 November 2017. His funeral took place in Denton, Lincolnshire with "Sweet Banana" and "When the Saints Go Marching In", the regimental marches of the RAR and RLI respectively, being played.
