= Operation Dingo =

1977 Rhodesian attack in Mozambique

Operation Dingo Chimoio massacre
- Part of the Rhodesian Bush War
- Operation Dingo (Mozambique)
Date	23–25 November 1977
Location	Chimoio and Tembue, Mozambique
Result	Rhodesian victory

Belligerents
Rhodesia	ZANLA

Commanders and leaders
(Rhodesia) Ian Smith (Rhodesia) Lt. Gen Peter Walls; Maj. Brian Robinson (Ground Force Commander); Gp Cap. Norman Walsh (Director of Air Operations)	Robert Mugabe; Edgar Tekere; Josiah Tongogara; Rex Nhongo

Units involved
Rhodesian Army; Rhodesian Light Infantry; Rhodesian Special Air Service; RhAF	Unknown

Strength
200 soldiers 9 Hunter fighter-bombers 6 Vampire fighter-bombers 6 Canberra light bombers 10 Alouette III helicopters (K-Car with 20mm cannon); 11 Alouette III G-Car (one as command helicopter); 3 DC-3C Dakota (Paradak)	8,000–10,000 inhabitants; refugees + guerrillas + ZANLA political/civil elements

Casualties and losses
2 killed 6 wounded 1 Vampire crashed 1 fighter-bomber crashed	1,200 to 3,000 killed or seriously injured

Operation Dingo, or the Chimoio Massacre , was an attack by the Rhodesian Security Forces against the Zimbabwe African National Liberation Army (ZANLA) run camps at Chimoio and Tembue in Mozambique from 23 to 25 November 1977.

Most sources put the death toll from the operation at over 1,000, including hundreds of civilians. Two Rhodesian soldiers were also killed.

== Background ==
Chimoio was a series of ZANLA-run refugee camps and, training facility, and a launchpad for insurgents infiltrating into Rhodesia. It was located at New Farm, known locally as Adriano's Farm. The old farmhouse, and a number of related monuments and graves, are located some 18 kilometres north-northeast of Chimoio Municipality.(18°57′24″S 33°30′58″E)

== The Chimoio complex ==
New Farm was a farm acquired by the Frelimo Government in 1975 from its Portuguese owner, known as 'Adriano'. It was handed over by the Mozambican government to ZANLA, which made it their refugee centre and subsequently a forward, military operating headquarters. It was home to military, political and other civilian occupants, and included a hospital, schools, and stores. The complex included:

- Adriano's farm house, or the 'White House'–Zanu Party HQ (residence of Josiah Tongogara and others of the general staff);
- Parirenyatwa camp hospital;
- Takawira Camp 1 for general military training;
- Takawira Camp 2 for engineering and anti-aircraft training (home to guerillas trained in China, Yugoslavia and Tanzania);
- Chitepo College of Ideology, for political indoctrination, propaganda, etc.;
- Chindunduma camp–a general school;
- Mbuya Nehanda A–a female military training camp;
- Mbuya Nehanda B–a gynaecology and obstetrics clinic;
- Pecy Ntini camp–a rehabilitation unit for disabled and wounded guerrillas;
- Chaminuka Camp–an internal security and intelligence unit doubling up as a prison;
- Zvede Zvevanhu camp–the military stores: ordnance, supply and vehicle pool, and the Mudzingadzi piggery;
- Pasichigare Camp–a camp for the accommodation of 'in-house' n'angas, mediums, predictors of the future and traditional healers;
- Sekuru Kaguvi Camp–a care-home for pensioned cadres or their older relatives.

== The attacks ==
The intention of concentrated air and ground firepower was to exploit the concentration of inhabitants, both refugees and militants, on the parade ground for morning parade. On that occasion, the morning parade had been cancelled, making the cluster bomb strike on the parade ground assembly ineffective. As part of a deception plan, a Douglas DC-8 airliner was flown over the Chimoio camps 10 minutes before the airstrike; the inhabitants assumed a second false alarm, and did not disperse or try to take cover when the bombers subsequently approached. In order to strike as many ground targets as possible, six mothballed Vampire jets dating from the 1940s were brought back into use for the operation.

At 0745 in the morning, directly after a strike by the Rhodesian Air Force's aging Canberra and Hunter strike aircraft, the camps were attacked. 96 Rhodesian SAS, 48 Rhodesian Light Infantry (RLI) paratroopers, and an additional 40 helicopter-borne RLI troops took part. In the first pass, four Canberra bombers dropped 1200 Alpha bombs (Rhodesian-designed anti-personnel bombs) over an area 1.1 kilometres (0.68 mi) long and 500 metres (1,600 ft) wide.

Mozambican-German boxer Ibraimo Alberto, in his 2014 autobiography, describes narrowly surviving an attack by Rhodesian aircraft during the operation, which bombed his school, killing many children.

Following the initial air strikes by the Canberras, Hunters and Vampire FB9's, ten Alouette III helicopter gunships ("K-Cars" in the Fireforce tactical terminology) engaged opportunity targets in allocated areas that together inflicted the majority of the casualties, while two Vampire T11's flew top cover. The paratroopers and heliborne troops were deployed on three sides of the objective into various stop groups and sweep lines, and were also effective in killing large numbers of fleeing ZANLA cadres. Nevertheless, the small size of the ground force and the lack of a complete envelopment allowed a number of fleeing ZANLA cadres to escape. Two important targets of the attack, ZANLA commanders Josiah Tongogara and Rex Nhongo escaped.

A "stay-behind" force of Rhodesian SAS remained in ambush positions around the area overnight, to wait for any ZANLA who might return; these SAS were then extracted by helicopter in the morning. The Rhodesian force withdrew, having lost one SAS member, Tpr. F.J. Nel, being shot and killed at Chimoio, and one Vampire pilot, Flt Lt Phillip Haigh, killed trying to crashland his jet in a field after his aircraft was damaged by ground fire. The pilot chose to attempt a forced landing rather than execute the dangerous act of bailing out of the Vampire which was not fitted with an ejection seat.

A similar attack was repeated two days later at Tembue. (14°47′33″S 32°50′10″E). Though there was a Mozambique Liberation Front base nearby at Chimoio they did not interfere in the Rhodesian force's activities.

== Aftermath ==
According to the Rhodesian government at least between 1,200 and 3,000 ZANLA guerillas were killed in Operation Dingo. Most sources put the death toll at over 1,000, adding that hundreds who were killed were actually civilians and not guerrillas. While two Rhodesian SAS soldiers died (one in the fighting and one by anti-aircraft fire on the return).

Bishop Abel Muzorewa called a week of mourning for raids on both camps as they contain many civilian refugees.

A new base was later built in the Chimoio area. The Rhodesians attacked it in 1978 under Operation Snoopy. Operation Dingo was to be followed by a further thirty cross-border raids before the end of the war.

== Legacy ==
National Museums and Monuments of Zimbabwe opened a site museum at the farm house,and a memorial at the site in 2011. The positions of the fallen are marked by at least twelve mass graves which are clustered around the main New Farm complex.

== See also ==
- Operation Eland
