= Ben Freeth =

White Zimbabwean farmer and human rights activist

- Born: 23 August 1971 (age 54); Sittingbourne, Kent, England
- Occupations: Commercial farmer and Human Rights activist
- Spouse: Laura Campbell
- Children: 3

Benjamin Freeth, MBE (born 23 August 1971) is a White Zimbabwean farmer and human rights activist from the district of Chegutu in Mashonaland West Province, Zimbabwe. Together with his father-in-law, Mike Campbell, he rose to international prominence after 2008 for suing the regime of Zimbabwean President Robert Mugabe for violating the rule of law and human rights in Zimbabwe. Freeth and Campbell's lawsuit against the Mugabe regime—the case of Mike Campbell (Pvt) Ltd and Others v Republic of Zimbabwe—was chronicled in the award-winning 2009 documentary film Mugabe and the White African.

== Background ==
Freeth was born in Sittingbourne, England, United Kingdom, the son of a British military family. After the independence of the Republic of Zimbabwe in 1980, the family relocated to the country where Freeth's father had been hired by the Zimbabwean government to set up a new staff training college for the newly established national army. Freeth attended Aiglon College and went on to study at the Royal Agricultural College in Gloucestershire, England, UK. He then returned to Zimbabwe and married Laura Campbell, the daughter of Rhodesian farmer Mike Campbell and his wife Angela. The Freeths built a house on the Campbells' 30,000 acres (12,000 ha) Mount Carmel estate in Chegutu and Freeth eventually became an official with the Commercial Farmers' Union. The couple have three children.

During the early 1970s, Campbell, a South African Army captain, was involved in the Rhodesian Bush War that pitted Rhodesia's white minority government against Black nationalist guerrillas. He moved to Mount Carmel farm in 1974. He added a neighbouring plot of land in 1980, following Zimbabwean independence. As well as farming, Campbell set up an extensive nature reserve on the property, replete with giraffes, impala and other indigenous animals. He also created the Biri River Safari Lodge, which became a popular tourist attraction.

Campbell purchased Mount Carmel from himself after independence (the full title was vested in 1999 when the Zimbabwean government declared no interest in the land). Together, Freeth and Mike Campbell managed the farm's operations and employed a sizeable number of local farm labourers while Laura oversaw a linen factory on the estate which employed many of the farm workers' wives.

The Mount Carmel estate was described as a model employer. By the late 1990s, it had become the largest mango producer in Zimbabwe. It also produced maize, tobacco and sunflowers and sustained the livelihoods of more than 500 local Zimbabwean people. In 1999, ownership of the farm was transferred to a family company by a "certificate of no interest" from the Mugabe government. Every farm bought after independence in 1980 had to be offered to the government first for possible land redistribution and then deeds were stamped "No Government Interest" if the government did not wish to purchase it.

== Lawsuit against Robert Mugabe ==
In 2001, however, the Freeths and Campbells were issued an eviction notice from the Government of Zimbabwe as part of Mugabe's controversial land reform programme. Under this programme, several thousand White-owned farms have been repossessed without compensation by the Zimbabwean government. While the stated intention of the programme is to redistribute land to disadvantaged Zimbabweans, many of the repossessed lands have been given to government officials and others loyal to the Mugabe regime. Subsequently, many of these farms have fallen into disrepair and are no longer active.

Freeth and Campbell chose to dispute the eviction order in court. After having been defeated in the Supreme Court of Zimbabwe, they took their case to the SADC Tribunal, a regional court of the Southern African Development Community. During the case, Freeth, together with Mike and Angela Campbell, was abducted and beaten by Mugabe supporters. The tribunal eventually ruled in Freeth and Campbell's favour, finding that the Zimbabwean government's land repossessions were entirely racially based and, therefore, were in violation of the SADC's principles of human rights. The government of Zimbabwe was ordered to respect Freeth and Campbell's right to own and operate their farm.

The Mugabe government ignored the ruling and later withdrew Zimbabwe from the SADC. In August 2009, the Mount Carmel estate was invaded by Mugabe supporters and Freeth and Campbell's homes were burned down, as were the homes of the farm's workers and their families. The Freeths and Campbells, as well as their workers, were driven from the property. As of 2011, the Mount Carmel estate has become derelict and overgrown. Mike Campbell died in April 2011, though Freeth has stated his intention to continue fighting to take back ownership of the property.

== Honours ==
In June 2010, Freeth was appointed a Member of the Order of the British Empire by Queen Elizabeth II in recognition of his human rights activism in Zimbabwe.
