= Operation Uric =

1979 Rhodesian Bush War operation

- Part of the Rhodesian Bush War (or Second Chimurenga)
Date	1–8 September 1979
Location	Mapai, Gaza Province, Mozambique 22.848084°S 31.960901°E
Result	ZANLA/Mozambican victory

Belligerents
Zimbabwe Rhodesia; South Africa	ZANLA (ZANU); Mozambique

Commanders and leaders
Gen. Peter Walls; Air Commodore Norman Walsh (South Africa) Brigadier Van Loggerenberg	Josiah Tongogara

Units involved
Rhodesian Army: SAS; RhAF; SADF: SAAF	ZANLA (ZANU) (Mozambique) FRELIMO

Strength
(Zimbabwe Rhodesia) : 200 soldiers 8 Hawker Hunters; 1 "Warthog" Dakota (ELINT); 6 Lynxes 6 Canberras operated by both Rhodesia and South Africa. 11 Dakotas operated by both Rhodesia and South Africa. Total 28 helicopters, mostly South Africans, including : (Zimbabwe Rhodesia); Alouette helicopters Huey aka Cheetah helicopters Alouette helicopters Several Super Frelon helicopters Several Puma helicopters	(Mozambique) : 1500 (Rhodesian claim)

Casualties and losses
(Zimbabwe Rhodesia) : 15 killed 1 wounded 1 Bell UH-1 destroyed (South Africa) : 3 killed 1 SA 330 Puma destroyed	(Mozambique) : 300+ killed (Rhodesian claim) (Mozambique) : None (Mozambican claim) four bridges dropped one dam heavily breached

Operation Uric (or Operation Bootlace for the South Africans) was a cross-border raid carried out in Mozambique by operatives of the Rhodesian Security Forces during the Rhodesian Bush War, with combat assistance from the South African Air Force. During the operation, which took place from 1 to 7 September 1979, up to 200 Rhodesian and South African military personnel attacked bridges and a major staging point for Zimbabwe African National Liberation Army (ZANLA) insurgents in Gaza Province. Along with Operation Miracle, this was one of the largest Rhodesian external operations of the war.

== Targets ==
During the Rhodesian Bush War (or Second Chimurenga) the Rhodesian Security Forces (RSF) had to deal with an increasing flow of externally trained insurgents coming into Rhodesia, latterly Zimbabwe Rhodesia, from its neighbouring countries, especially from Zambia and Mozambique, the latter in particular after its independence in 1975.

The objectives of Operation Uric were to destroy road & rail bridges from Maputo to Mapai to cut off ZANLA's supply routes into the Gaza Province of Mozambique and to attack the ZANLA forces in their command centre in Mapai before they could enter Zimbabwe-Rhodesia. It was also hoped that the destruction of communication and railway lines, roads and bridges as far as 200 miles into Mozambique would affect the economic situation and the morale of those who supported ZANLA and Robert Mugabe.

Targets were the five road & rail bridges at Barragem, Chicacatem, Folgares, Canicado, and Mezichopes, a vital irrigation canal feeding a major agricultural area in Mozambique and joint Frelimo-ZANLA camp at Mapai. Air strikes were planned on FRELIMO installations in Mapai and Maxaila to demoralise the occupants. Afterwards the base at Mapai would be taken and destroyed by Zimbabwe-Rhodesian ground forces.

== Attack ==
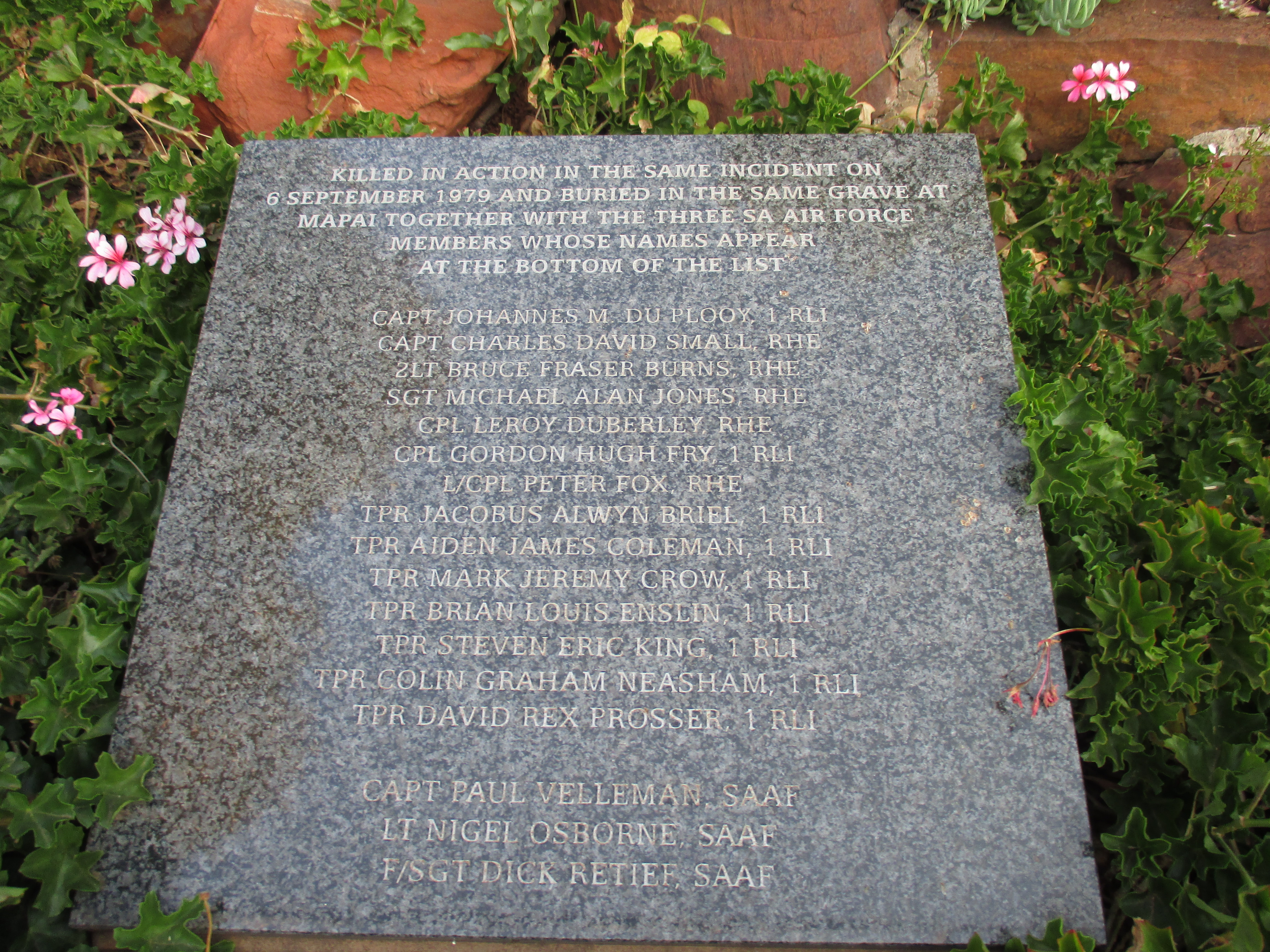
Plaque honouring seventeen Rhodesian and South African servicemen killed during Uric.

Prior to the attack, 200 Zimbabwe Rhodesian troops had been deployed into an area 161 kilometres (100 mi) inside of Mozambique east-southeast of Chigubu. Helicopters were at Chipinda Pools airstrip within Zimbabwe Rhodesia. The attack only began on 5 September because of bad weather conditions. Rhodesian SAS troops were airlifted to Aldeia De Barragem and four other targets to destroy bridges and infrastructure. Hawker Hunter jets and Cessna Lynx aircraft bombed the area and provided air support. During evacuation of a wounded soldier one AB-205A helicopter was shot down by a RPG-7 with the technician, LAC AJC Wesson killed on impact. The pilot Flt Lt Dick Paxton was rescued by the SAS.

Operation was planned to start on 2 September but had to be delayed due to bad weather. On 6 September the ZANLA base at Mapai was bombarded by Hawker Hunters destroying the command centre and the main radar station. Initial plan to siege and starve Mapai camp was aborted. Instead it is decided to attack. During transport operations a South African Puma helicopter was hit by an RPG-7 at 22.740028°S 32.105278°E killing all 14 Zimbabwe-Rhodesian commandos and the three South African Air Force crew on board. This was the highest loss of life for the Rhodesian Security Forces in a single incident during the war. The crash site was later bombed in an attempt to cover the South African markings on the Puma helicopter. The bodies were never recovered. The Mapai base was fortified by interconnecting zig-zag trenches which provided good cover for the defenders. Heavy fighting took place between the Rhodesian Army and the Mozambican Armed Forces. Mapai was repeatedly bombarded by Hunter jets and Canberra bombers, but the defenders held their position. Shortly before sundown the decision to withdraw was taken by the Supreme Commander of the Rhodesian Army General Walls.

== Aftermath ==
The Rhodesian government claimed that over 300 ZANLA and Mozambican soldiers were killed and a number of bridges, buildings and infrastructure had been destroyed. Zimbabwe Rhodesian casualties were 15 killed, which amounted to a disaster for the Rhodesian forces, despite a kill-ratio of over 20:1. It became obvious to the Rhodesian Security Forces that their enemy would soon become a more legitimate fighting force than before, who were trained by their Eastern Bloc advisers, and who were now, through experience, standing their ground through air attacks unlike earlier in the war. Zimbabwe Rhodesian soldiers were well trained, motivated, and equipped, but international sanctions such as United Nations Security Council Resolution 232, and isolation had led to increased problems in replacing mostly aircraft, while arms and ammo were mostly plentiful in stocks.

Mozambique's government disputed the number of casualties, stating it had killed over 50 Rhodesian soldiers and suffered no casualties of its own, which the Rhodesian government denied. However it is clear that Mozambique suffered heavily in infrastructures and economy. It can be speculated that politically, the operation led to Samora Machel putting pressure on Robert Mugabe to take part in the Lancaster House peace talks. Machel wanted to prevent Mozambique from being dragged further into the war with Zimbabwe Rhodesia, which had already seriously damaged its economy.
