= Turnhalle (Windhoek) =

Coordinates: 22.5606°S 17.08553°E

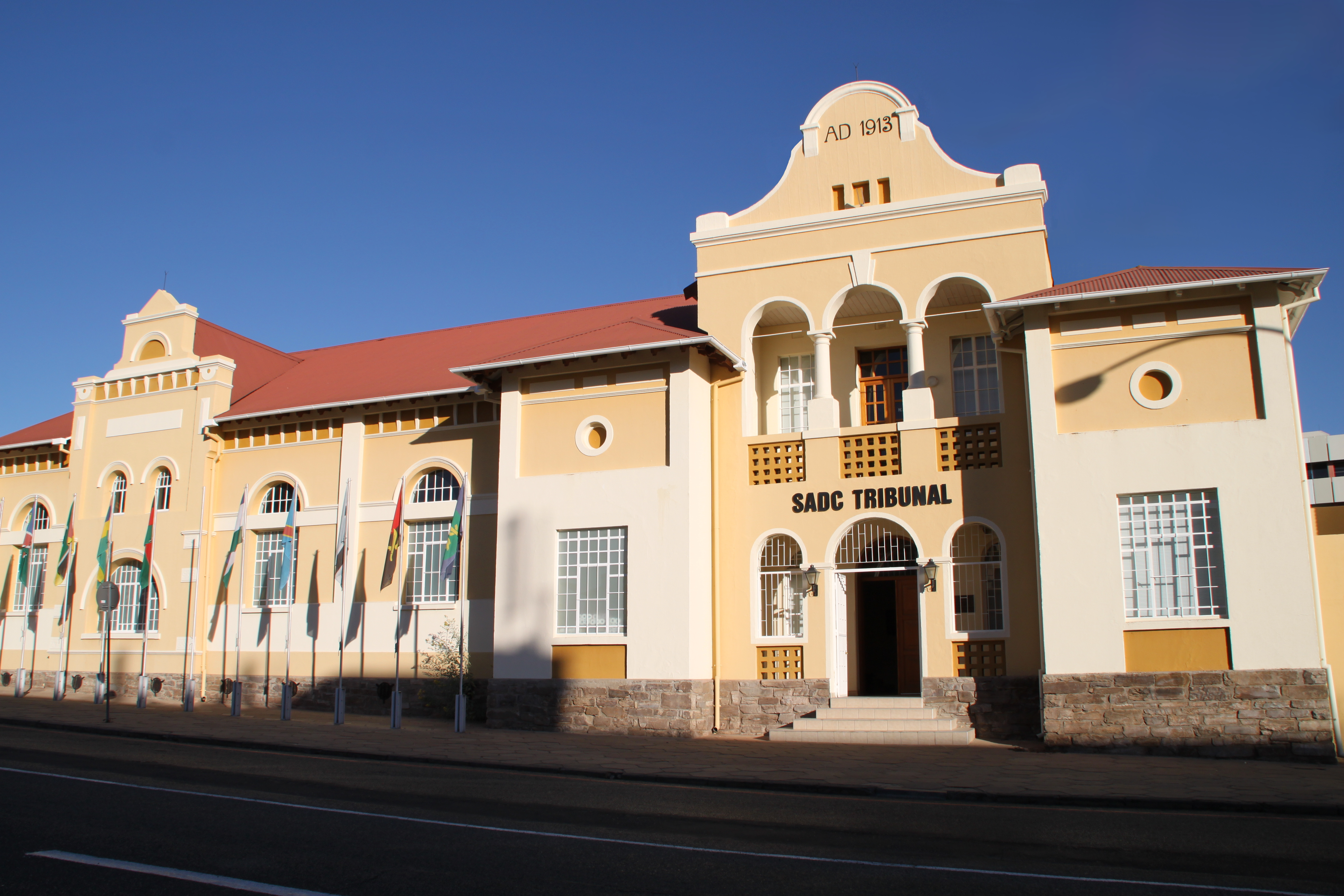
Windhoek's historic Turnhalle building

The Turnhalle (English: sports hall) is a building in Windhoek, the capital of Namibia. Built during the era of Imperial Germany's colonisation of South West Africa, it has been through a variety of uses, most prominently as the venue for the 1975–1977 Turnhalle Constitutional Conference, an attempt to quell armed resistance waged by the People's Liberation Army of Namibia against South African occupation. The Turnhalle housed the Tribunal court of the Southern African Development Community (SADC) until disbandment in 2012.

== Erection ==
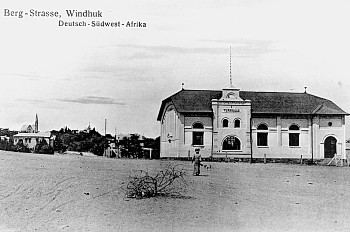
Turnhalle before its 1912/1913 extension

Soon after the foundation of modern Windhoek in October 1890, a posh suburb developed on the slope of the hill opposite the city's railway station. The first Turners club, a German gymnastics association influenced by the suggestions of Turnvater Jahn, was founded in 1899. Exercise and practice took place where the Turnhalle stands today. A temporary corrugated iron structure was erected in 1905.

On 6 March 1909, the foundation for a 22 m x 14 m gymnasium with high ceilings and a street-facing gable was laid. The Turnhalle building was inaugurated nine months later on 11 December 1909. The neo-classicist building of Wilhelmine architecture was regarded as "the most beautiful building in the northern part of town", and it was the first timber-girdered roof structure in the German colony.

Soon the building grew too small for its purpose. A double-storey extension was appended on the western side of the building during the years of 1912 and 1913. The date inscription above the main entrance refers to this extension. Architect Otto Busch designed both parts of the building. Master architect Wilhelm Sander's proposal was ignored for the extension.

== Usage ==
The Turnhalle was used for school physical training and gymnastic competitions, as well as for recreational sports. During World War I it accommodated South African troops. After a stage was added, the building was also used for theatre performances and cinema. After Namibian independence in 1990, the Turnhalle was used as a conference venue, and for the National Council of Namibia, until that body moved to Tintenpalast. Afterwards it was earmarked to accommodate the SADC Tribunal court but burned down on 18 January 2007. It has been restored since then; the SADC Tribunal became operational in April of the same year.

=== Turnhalle Conference ===
When in the 1970s the South African administration came under increasing pressure to grant independence to the people of South West Africa, it convened a conference tasked with the development of a constitution for a self-governed Namibia under South African control. This conference was named the Turnhalle Constitutional Conference after the venue where it was hosted between 1975 and 1977.

Sponsored by the South African government, the Turnhalle Conference laid the framework for the government of South West Africa from 1977 to independence in 1990. The conference was held in defiance of the 1972 United Nations General Assembly decision to recognise the South West Africa People's Organization (SWAPO) as the "sole legitimate representative" of Namibia's people. Consequently, SWAPO, as well as other political groups rejecting apartheid, did not participate, and the United Nations rejected the conference and its proposals.

As a result of the Turnhalle Conference, the Democratic Turnhalle Alliance (DTA) party was formed in 1977. It won the 1978 elections and formed an interim government. Also other smaller parties carry Turnhalle in their name in reference to the Turnhalle Conference. The Namibia Democratic Turnhalle Party and the Rehoboth DTA Party both formed part of the DTA.

=== SADC Tribunal ===
From 2005 to 2012 the SADC Tribunal, the highest policy institution of the Southern African Development Community, was housed in the Turnhalle building in Windhoek. Although established on paper since 1992, members of the Tribunal were only appointed during the SADC Summit in 2005. On 18 November 2005 the Tribunal was inaugurated and the members were sworn in by Peter Shivute, Chief Justice of Namibia of the Namibian Supreme Court.

Before the first case was heard by the Tribunal, the Turnhalle burned down on 18 January 2007. The court room was completely destroyed. Reconstruction work started in November 2007.

In one of its first cases, Mike Campbell (Pvt) Ltd and Others v Republic of Zimbabwe the Tribunal ruled in 2007 and 2008 that the government of Zimbabwe could not evict farmer Mike Campbell from his land, and that farm seizures per Amendment 17 of the Zimbabwean constitution amounted to de facto discrimination against her white citizens. Following this ruling, Zimbabwe departed the SADC Tribunal and challenged its legitimacy. The 2010 SADC summit then ordered a review of the "functions and [...] terms of reference of the SADC Tribunal", a step that a group of legal and human rights organizations described as "virtually suspending" this inter-regional court. The Tribunal at that time had only four of ten judges appointed and did not accept nor hear any cases. SADC disbanded the Tribunal in 2012.
