= Solomon Mujuru =

Zimbabwean military officer and politician

Second Gentleman of Zimbabwe
- In office 6 December 2004 – 15 August 2011
- Vice President: Joice Mujuru
- Preceded by: Maud Muzenda (as Second Lady, 2003)
- Succeeded by: Auxillia Mnangagwa (as Second Lady, 2014)

Commander of the Zimbabwe National Army
- In office 1981–1992
- President: Robert Mugabe
- Preceded by: Peter Walls
- Succeeded by: Vitalis Zvinavashe

Personal details
- Born: Solomon Tapfumaneyi Mutusva; 5 May 1945 Enkeldoorn, Southern Rhodesia
- Died: 15 August 2011 (aged 66) Alamein Farm, Beatrice, Zimbabwe
- Resting place: National Heroes' Acre
- Party: ZANU-PF
- Spouse: Joice Mujuru
- Occupation: Military leader, politician
- Nickname: Rex Nhongo

Military service
- Allegiance: Zimbabwe
- Branch/service: Zimbabwe African National Liberation Army; Zimbabwe National Army
- Years of service: 1964–1990
- Rank: General
- Battles/wars: Rhodesian Bush War; Attack on Altena Farm; Attack on Odzanu Junction Farm; Operation Dingo; Operation Miracle

Solomon Mujuru (born Solomon Tapfumaneyi Mutusva; 5 May 1945 – 15 August 2011), also known by his nom-de-guerre, Rex Nhongo, was a Zimbabwean military officer and politician who led Robert Mugabe's guerrilla forces during the Rhodesian Bush War. He was an influential figure in Zimbabwe's post-independence politics.

He was from the Zezuru clan. In post-independence Zimbabwe, he went on to become army chief before leaving government service in 1995. After leaving his post in the Zimbabwe National Army, he got into politics becoming Member of Parliament for Chikomba on a Zanu PF ticket. He was generally regarded as one of the most feared men in Zimbabwe. His wife, Joice Mujuru, became vice-president of Zimbabwe in 2004.

== Biography ==
=== Early life ===
He was born Solomon Tapfumaneyi Mutusva Mujuru in Enkeldoorn, Southern Rhodesia. He was raised in colonial Rhodesia's Chikomba region. Mujuru took an interest in politics at an early age. He was first arrested for his activism while a student at Zimuto High School and later joined the youth league of the Zimbabwe African People's Union (ZAPU). He was detained again by the Rhodesian authorities in 1966 and sentenced to two years' imprisonment. Upon his release, Mujuru fled to Lusaka, Zambia, where he was recruited for guerrilla training in the Soviet Union.

=== Rhodesian Bush War ===
During the Zimbabwe War of Liberation Mujuru, with Josiah Tongogara, led the Zimbabwe African National Liberation Army (ZANLA) while Robert Mugabe was in jail for 10 years (from 1964 to 1974). Mugabe, along with Edgar Tekere, subsequently slipped into Mozambique after their release, with assistance from chief Rekayi Tangwena, where Mujuru petitioned the insurgents to accept Mugabe as their leader.

In 1976, Mujuru was appointed military chief of the Patriotic Front, a theoretical amalgamation of ZAPU and Mugabe's Zimbabwe African National Union (ZANU). From 1976 to 1979, he supervised operational planning, infiltration, and the movement of ZANLA cadres inside Rhodesia. In 1980, the ZANLA commander was instrumental in demobilising former guerrillas in assembly points monitored by Commonwealth forces.

=== Post-Independence ===
Promoted to general in the new Zimbabwe National Army, Mujuru oversaw ZANLA's integration into the Zimbabwe Defence Forces. He was appointed chief of the army following the resignation of Lieutenant-General Peter Walls, and retired in 1992 to go into business. As a civilian, he became influential in the Zimbabwe National Liberation War Veterans Association, lobbying for increased veterans' welfare and a prominent stake in the land reform programme.

== Politics ==
It was generally thought that Mujuru had a tremendous amount of influence on who would lead ZANU-PF and the country. He was the only person believed to have had the stature to challenge Mugabe during party meetings. Newspaper reports claimed Mujuru had been under house arrest and 24-hour surveillance between 2007 and 2008 for his role in attempting to oust Mugabe. However, he remained an influential member of the ruling ZANU-PF politburo and central committees. Mujuru and his wife were among the ZANU-PF party members subject to personal sanctions imposed by the United States.

== Business and Black Economic Empowerment ==
Mujuru was a successful businessman and commercial farmer, who both advocated and benefitted from indigenisation and black economic empowerment in Zimbabwe. He had diverse business ventures, which included mining, agriculture, transport, tourism and investment in the construction industry. In the mid-1990s Mujuru clashed with Emmerson Mnangagwa, long considered Mugabe's favoured heir, when Solomon bid to buy into the multibillion-dollar Zimasco, a chrome mining and smelting concern in Zimbabwe's Midlands Province.

== Farming ==
Popular speculation is that Mujuru owned anywhere between six and sixteen farms, including Alamein Farm, seized from Guy Watson-Smith during the fast-track land reform in 2001. His seizure of Alamein Farm was at the time ruled illegal by the Supreme Court of Zimbabwe.

Mujuru farmed with tobacco, maize and game at Alamein Farm. Farm workers also produced their own tobacco on land allocated to them.

== Death ==
Solomon Mujuru died in a fire in the early hours of the night of 15 August 2011, at the homestead of Alamein Farm, in circumstances that many commentators suggest were suspicious.

He had stopped at the Beatrice Hotel, 60 km south-west of Harare, where he had drunk and chatted with patrons; he was having an early night before a long journey the next day. A maid and guard at the farm testified they heard gunshots two hours before flames were seen at his farmhouse. Mujuru had left groceries and his mobile phone in his car, something he had never done before. The general had taken 40 minutes to drive from the hotel to his farm, a journey of 10 minutes. The lone policeman was asleep at the time, and after he awoke, he had no airtime, and the radio was broken. When the firetruck arrived it had no water.

An inquiry was opened. The coroner investigating Mujuru's death concluded he had died of smoke inhalation, but Mujuru's family lacks confidence in the coroner's findings. They plan to petition for approval to exhume Mujuru's remains and have them independently examined by a doctor of their own choice. Mujuru's remains are located at Heroes' Acre, a memorial in Zimbabwe.
