= Mugabe and the White African =

- Directed by: Lucy Bailey; Andrew Thompson
- Produced by: David Pearson; Elizabeth Morgan Hemlock
- Cinematography: Andrew Thompson
- Edited by: Tim Lovell
- Music by: Jonny Pilcher
- Production company: Arturi Films
- Distributed by: Dogwoof
- Release date: 21 October 2009 (London Film Festival)
- Running time: 90 minutes
- Country: United Kingdom
- Language: English

Mugabe and the White African is a 2009 documentary film by Lucy Bailey & Andrew Thompson and produced by David Pearson & Elizabeth Morgan Hemlock. It has won many awards including the Grierson 2010 and been BAFTA and Emmy Nominated. The film documents the lives of a white Zimbabwean family who run a farm in Chegutu, as they challenge the Fast Track land redistribution programme that redistributed white-owned estates, a legacy of colonialism and UDI, beginning in 2000. The film follows Mike Campbell, his son-in-law Ben Freeth, and their family as they challenge Robert Mugabe and the Zimbabwean government before the Southern African Development Community tribunal for racial discrimination and human rights violations. The film premiered in the UK on 21 October 2009 at the London Film Festival.

== Reception ==
The documentary garnered considerable critical acclaim. On the review aggregator website Rotten Tomatoes, 97% of 36 critics' reviews are positive, with an average rating of 7.5/10. The website's consensus reads: "As much legal thriller as objective documentary, this account of a farmer's battle with Zimbabwe's regime serves as a powerful and emotional attack upon President Mugabe." Metacritic, which uses a weighted average, assigned the film a score of 77 out of 100, based on 11 critics, indicating "generally favorable" reviews.

=== Awards and honours ===
- Sterling World Feature Award, 2009 SILVERDOCS: AFI/Discovery Channel Documentary Festival.

== See also ==
- Mike Campbell (Pvt) Ltd and Others v Republic of Zimbabwe
