= Zimuto High School (Zimbabwe) =

- Masvingo Province; Zimbabwe

Information
- School type: Mission boarding school
- Motto: Tinokwirira (forever upwards)
- Religious affiliation: Reformed Church in Zimbabwe
- Age range: 13–18
- Language: English
- Website: www.zimutohighschool.com

Zimuto High School is an English speaking, Christian secondary school, run by the Reformed Church In Zimbabwe (RCZ) co-educational boarding school for "A" level and "O" level pupils in Zimbabwe. It is among the best high schools in the country and the SADC region attracting student from beyond national boundaries. It is located in Masvingo province only about 16 kilometers outside the city (Masvingo). Zimuto High School is a school that caters for the students from the age of 13 years at Form 1, through Secondary School to A Level. During the High School years Zimuto offers the youngsters some a variety of courses which give students good survival skills. “Tinokwirira” is the school's motto. It comprises more than 50 teaching staff and employs more than 100 non teaching ones. The headmaster is Mr Harris Mashava whilst the deputy is Mr Jonathan Makaudze.

== Notable alumni ==
- Solomon Mujuru, Zimbabwean general and politician
