= Attack on Altena Farm =

1972 attack in the Rhodesian Bush War

- Part of Rhodesian Bush War
- Operational scope: Terrorist attack
- Location: Centenary, Rhodesia
- Planned by: Rex Nhongo
- Target: Altena Farm
- Objective: Assassination of Marc de Borchgrave; Observation of response by Rhodesian Security Forces
- Date: 21 December 1972; 3:00 AM
- Executed by: ZANLA
- Outcome: Severe damage to Altena Farm
- Casualties: One occupant slightly wounded None killed De Borchgrave's daughter, non-fatal injured

The attack on Altena Farm occurred in the early hours of 21 December 1972, during the third phase of the Rhodesian Bush War. Altena was a tobacco farm owned by Marc de Borchgrave, a white Rhodesian landowner who was unpopular among the local civilians. Some sources have indicated that this marked the beginning of the conflict proper, despite the minor threat already represented by guerrilla movements in Rhodesia in the late 1960s.

== Background ==
Rhodesian intelligence, which had been monitoring ZANLA's activity and preparations, grew curious when over a four-week period in November 1972 sources of information suddenly began to "dry up", in the words of historian Alexandre Binda. "They sensed that something was afoot, but their superiors brushed off their fears," Binda says. "The senior Rhodesian authorities had been lulled into a sense of arrogant self-confidence based on the security forces' past successes." This false veneer of security was smashed on 21 December 1972 when a group of ten ZANLA cadres led by Rex Nhongo attacked the white-owned Altena Farm near the north-eastern village of Centenary, about 30 kilometres (19 mi) west of Mount Darwin.

ZANLA had planned for four attacks to take place simultaneously but in the event only Nhongo's men did so. According to the historian Elaine Windrich, Nhongo was a former employee of the tobacco farm's 37-year-old owner, Marc de Borchgrave, and held a grudge against him.

== The Raid ==
Having established a presence in the nearby Chiweshe Tribal Trust Territory, a group of Zimbabwe African National Liberation Army (ZANLA) insurgents armed with AK-47s, hand grenades, and at least one light machine gun (most likely an RPD) trekked about six miles to reach Altena. A list of white farmers in the Centenary district was drawn up and de Borchgrave was marked for elimination due to his poor reputation among black farmworkers. Farmers known for their popularity in the workforce were also identified and removed from the list of potential targets. The group's leader, Rex Nhongo, planned to carry out the attack and observe follow-up operations carried out by the Rhodesian Security Forces.

Around three o'clock that morning, the guerrillas cut the telephone lines and laid a land mine in the driveway. Nhongo undertook a reconnaissance of the farmhouse before the attack commenced. Each insurgent then expended at least two magazines of ammunition apiece at the structure. Hand grenades were also thrown. Despite the damage caused to the structure, only de Borchgrave's eight-year-old daughter Jane was injured.

Deducing that Nhongo may have mined the driveway, de Borchgrave set off on foot to seek assistance. The insurgents retreated, burning down what they believed to be a white-owned store during the withdrawal. Rex Nhongo was later stopped and questioned by some members of the British South Africa Police, but as his identity documents were in order and he had concealed his weapons, he was not detained.

== Aftermath ==
Late on 22 December, a troop from the Rhodesian Special Air Service, followed shortly by the Rhodesian Light Infantry, reported to the police station in Centenary. The land mine in Altena's driveway was discovered, disarmed and removed. For their own safety, Marc de Borchgrave and his family were sent to another farm while their home was being repaired.

Having been alerted to the de Borchgraves' new location through sympathetic farmworkers, guerrillas from the original cadre requested permission from ZANLA to carry out another attack. After ZANLA's area commanders in Centenary had been consulted, a raid on the second target (Whistlefield Farm) was planned. The property was owned by an Archie Dalgleish.

At about one o'clock on the morning of 23 December, the insurgents reconnoitred Whistlefield Farm and shelled the structure with mortar fire. An RPG-7 was also discharged at the window of the de Borchgraves' bedroom. Several occupants, including de Borchgrave, were slightly wounded. ZANLA claimed that Rhodesian troops posted within shouting distance of the home responded to the scene and saved the lives of Dalgleish and his guests by engaging the assailants. Six huts and a mosque in the farmworkers' compound were also torched during the skirmish, although accounts differ on who started the fire.

== Bibliography ==
- Petter-Bowyer, P. J. H. (November 2005) [2003]. Winds of Destruction: the Autobiography of a Rhodesian Combat Pilot. Johannesburg: 30° South Publishers. ISBN 978-0-9584890-3-4.
- Binda, Alexandre (May 2008). The Saints: The Rhodesian Light Infantry. Johannesburg: 30° South Publishers. ISBN 978-1-920143-07-7.
- Raeburn, Michael (1978). Black Fire! Narratives of Rhodesian Guerrillas. New York: Random House. ISBN 978-0394505305.
