= Attack on Odzanu Junction Farm =

Zimbabwean terrorist attack

Attack on Odzani Junction Farm
- Part of Rhodesian Bush War
- Type: Terrorist attack
- Planned by: Rex Nhongo
- Target: Odzani Junction Farm
- Date: 20 August 1977
- Executed by: ZANLA
- Outcome: Severe damage to farm workers accommodation Odzanu Junction Farm
- Casualties: 16 black Rhodesians killed 12–20+ black Rhodesians injured

The Attack on Odzanu Junction Farm happened on 20 August 1977, when cadres from the ZANLA attacked the Odzanu Junction farm, which is 17 miles (27 km) north of Unitali on the Mozambique border. The farm was owned by white Rhodesian farmer Marius Sleigh.

== The Raid ==
The cadres attacked the houses on the farm which housed the farm's labour force, composed of black Rhodesians. The cadres rounded up the workers and their families before they opened fire indiscriminately on the men, women and children. Twelve men and women and two children were killed and twelve wounded. Two of the wounded died later in hospital. The sound of gunfire woke up Mr Sleigh and his sixteen-year-old son, Cornelle Sleigh, when they left their house they saw that the cadres had set fire to their farm's workers compound after they had shot the workers and their families. Mr Sleigh and Cornelle Sleigh opened fire on the terrorists, with guns that they kept in their house for protection, and the terrorists fled into the bush, firing a few shots as they went.
