= Land reform in Zambia =

Land reform in Zambia refers to the process of land reform in Zambia.

== Zimbabwean farmers ==
In 2001, neighbouring Zimbabwe's government undertook aggressive land reform policies which included invasions of farms owned by White Zimbabweans. Many of those farmers moved to Zambia and took up farming again. They produced maize and tobacco on large farms.
