= Simpson Mutambanengwe =

Zimbabwean judge

Simpson Victor Mutambanengwe (also: Mtambanengwe, 1930 – 11 May 2017) was a Zimbabwean judge. He served on the High Courts of Zimbabwe and Namibia and was the chairperson of the Zimbabwean Electoral Commission.

== Early life and education ==
Mutambanengwe was born at the Old Umtali Mission in eastern Southern Rhodesia (now Mutare, Zimbabwe) on 9 December 1930 with a twin sister Abigail Gloria Mutambanengwe. He attended school at Mutambara Mission and Goromonzi School, after which he worked as a teacher for one year at Old Umtali Mission.

He studied English and History at the University College of Rhodesia and Nyasaland. He graduated with a Bachelor of Arts in 1959. He then studied law at the Inner Temple, in London and became an advocate in 1963. After practising law there until 1964, he returned to Rhodesia, working as an advocate until 1979. During that time he also served as ZANU Secretary for Foreign Affairs.

== Judicial career ==
From 1979 on he worked as a lawyer in independent Zimbabwe until 1986 when he was appointed a High Court Judge. In 1994 he was appointed to the Namibian High Court.

Mutambanengwe also served on the Supreme Court of Namibia, both as acting Chief Justice of Namibia and after his retirement several times as Acting Judge of Appeal.

He was appointed chairman of the Zimbabwean Electoral Commission on 31 March 2010, despite being a controversial figure in Zimbabwe. Mutambanengwe was a key figure in the Nhari rebellion in 1974, known for his outspokenness and independent judgements on various courts. He resigned from this position in February 2013, shortly before the scheduled referendum on a new constitution for Zimbabwe. Mutambanengwe gave his declining health as reason for this move while Zimbabwean independent media speculate that he was deliberately pushed out.

=== Notable cases ===
- In the Caprivi treason trial Mutambanengwe along with Judges of Appeal Gerhard Maritz and Johan Strydom ruled in Namibia's Supreme Court (State vs. Malumo and 24 Others) that confessions from 25 accused are inadmissible before the High Court in Windhoek due to the occurrence of "coercive actions" at the hands of Police or military to obtain the testimonies.
