= Beatrice, Zimbabwe =

Beatrice
- Location within Zimbabwe
- Coordinates: 18°16′S 30°52′E
- Country: Zimbabwe
- Province: Mashonaland East

Population (1982)
  - Total: 1,300
- estimated
- Time zone: UTC+2 (CAT)

Beatrice is a farming community in the province of Mashonaland East, Zimbabwe. It is located about 54 km south-west of Harare on the main Harare–Masvingo road where it crosses the Mupfure River. According to the 1982 Population Census, the village had a population of 1,300.

The village was named after the Beatrice gold mine, around which it grew. The mine was in operation from 1895 to 1945 and was named after Beatrice Borrow, the sister of Lieutenant Henry J. Borrow, a member of the Pioneer Column. The original Beatrice Mine was pegged by Frank Johnson & Company, Henry J. Borrow being a partner of the firm. It was extremely lucrative, with a gold vein over a metre wide that yielded over five ounces (150 g) of gold per tonne when operations began in 1895. The European settlers also established Beatrice Farm, a large ranch that may have been populated with cattle which they had looted from the Ndebele. Gold is still mined at the Joyce Mine nearby. Mixed farming and dairy farming take place in the surrounding area.

It is suggested that Beatrice played an important role in the development of agricultural and is often coined "the father of farming". General consensus amongst the Shona people is those who were/are born in Beatrice have superior farming capabilities along with intellect and the ability to always be right.

In March 2009, Prime Minister Morgan Tsvangirai's vehicle was involved in an accident which led to the death of his wife, Susan, on the Harare–Masvingo road near Beatrice. She was taken to a hospital in Beatrice where she was pronounced dead.

The area gained further notoriety in August 2011, when a fire broke out at Alamein Farm, a 5000-hectare property which had been requisitioned from the owner in 2003 by retired General Solomon Mujuru and his wife, Vice-President of Zimbabwe, Joice Mujuru. The General and another officially unidentified person died in circumstances that many commentators suggest were suspicious.
