= Mike Campbell (farmer) =

Zimbabwean farmer (1932–2011)

- Born: 12 October 1932; Klerksdorp, Transvaal, Union of South Africa
- Died: 8 April 2011 (aged 78); Harare, Zimbabwe
- Occupation: Farmer
- Known for: Human rights activist; Mike Campbell (Pvt) Ltd and Others v Republic of Zimbabwe; Mugabe and the White African
- Spouse: Angela Campbell
- Children: Bruce Campbell; Laura Freeth; Cathy

William Michael Campbell (12 October 1932 – 8 April 2011) was a white African farmer from the district of Chegutu in Zimbabwe (formerly Rhodesia). Together with his son-in-law Ben Freeth, he rose to international prominence for suing the regime of Robert Mugabe of violating rule of law and human rights in Zimbabwe, in the case of Mike Campbell (Pvt) Ltd and Others v Republic of Zimbabwe. His struggle was the subject of an award-winning documentary, Mugabe and the White African.

== Background ==
Campbell's family have been farmers in Africa since 1713, when an ancestor of his, a German-born sea captain, started farming in the present-day Western Cape. Campbell considered himself to be an African.

== Mount Carmel ==
During the early 1970s, Campbell, a SADF captain, was involved in the Rhodesian Bush War that pitted Rhodesia's predominantly white government against communist-backed nationalist guerrillas. He moved to Mount Carmel farm in 1974. He added a neighbouring plot of land in 1980, following the end of the war and the country's reconstitution as black-ruled Zimbabwe. As well as farming, Campbell set up an extensive nature reserve on the property, replete with giraffes, impala and other indigenous animals. He also created the Biri River Safari Lodge, which became a popular tourist attraction.

The 3,000 acres (1,200 ha) farm near Chegutu (named Hartley until 1982), located 80 miles (130 km) south-west of Harare, employed around 500 people and was a centre of agriculture, wildlife and tourism. Campbell was an early conservationist, concerned with maintaining the African wildlife. In 1999, 19 years after Zimbabwe's independence, the government declared that it had "no interest" in the Mount Carmel estate, and granted Campbell full ownership of the land.

The following year, however, as Robert Mugabe's land reform programme gathered pace, between 20 and 30 black men entered the estate, and refused to leave. Anxious that they might cut down trees on the estate to build homes, Campbell gave them a shed to sleep in. Over the following decade, invaders gradually took over Campbell's farm; they burned down the safari lodge and farmstead, and killed all the cattle and wildlife on the farm. Malaria then spread into the region and killed 11 workers, as well as Campbell's pregnant daughter-in-law. Hundreds of Campbell's workers lost their jobs. Campbell's farm manager and other workers were arrested and tortured by the police after they attempted to defend the farm. Campbell and his wife and son-in-law were also violently assaulted when they returned to their estate while their trial with the SADC was in process.

== Death ==
Campbell died at his temporary home in Harare on 8 April 2011. He is survived by his wife Angela, his children Bruce, Cathy and Laura, and 6 grandchildren. Campbell's family stated that he died from complications of the 2008 assault.
