= Land Apportionment Act of 1930 =

Southern Rhodesian legislation

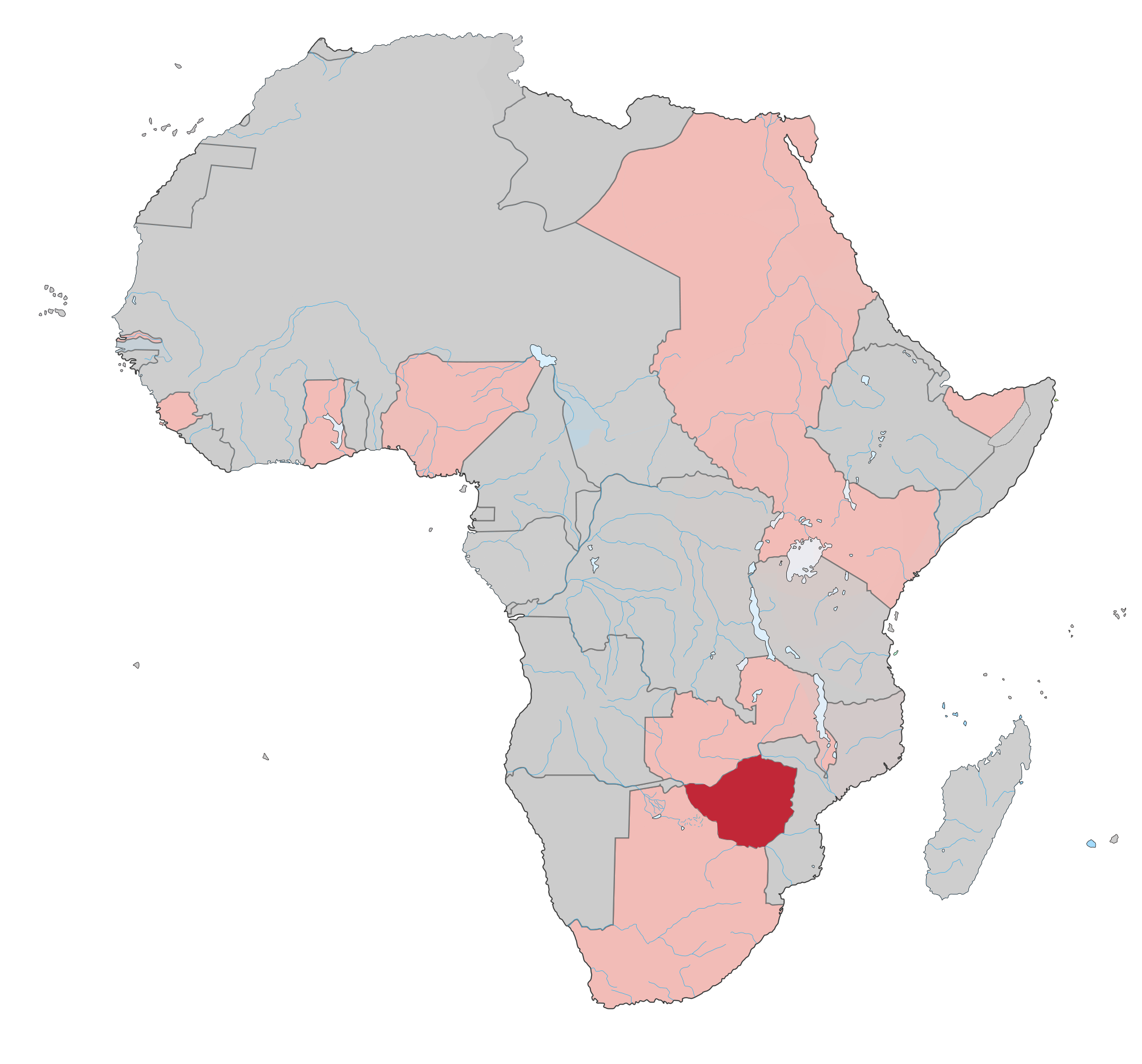
Location of Zimbabwe (in dark red) within the African continent in 1914 (other British colonies, dominions or protectorates in light red); at the time it was known as Southern Rhodesia.

The 1930 Land Apportionment Act made it illegal for Africans to purchase land outside of established Native Purchase Areas in the region of Southern Rhodesia, what is now known as Zimbabwe. Before the 1930 act, land was not openly accessible to natives, but there were also no legal barriers to ownership. The Act was passed under British colonial rule in an attempt to prevent a loss of government authority over those native to the region.

The Act led to the eventual overpopulation of Native Reservations, and limited native African access to quality land that resulted in large economic and social inequality. The consequences of The Land Apportionment Act of 1930 can be seen in the legislation passed to address the issues it created, such as the Native Land Husbandry act of the 1950s, that also enforced land segregation and limited native opportunities in Southern Rhodesia. Post independence, land reform continues to maintain its salience in Zimbabwe, as the current administration works to redefine land ownership in the twenty-first century.

== Land rights before 1930 ==
Flag of Southern Rhodesia under the British South Africa Company, along with the insignia.

Various southern Bantu peoples inhabited Matabele and Mashonalands (what is now known as Zimbabwe) for thousands of years according to fossilized evidence and discovery of present tribes' artifacts stretching over the last nine centuries. Alongside archived DNA proof of African Peoples around Great Zimbabwean ruins as early as 1500s and various tribal oral history accounts paint a picture of the native settlements and land past. Land ownership of most agrarian peoples consisted of common tribal communal lands for sustenance and trade with pastoralists. Peoples thrived in this land structure while mining gold, copper and Ivory for barter trade with even the far away ancient Chinese dynasties during Kingdom of Zimbabwe (Great Zimbabwe ruins) era. The exploration and subsequent settlement of European Christian missionaries in the late 19th century greatly increased the population of foreigners, with the areas temperate climate found suitable by most of these new immigrants. While concessions and treaties with tribal chiefs made up the vast majority of legal agreements in these native tribal lands through most of the 18th and 19th centuries, it wasn't until the partition and Scramble for Africa after the 1884 Berlin Conference that territorial control switched from local (native) to colonial (foreign) rule. Colonialism also shifted the power base from the local natives to colonial foreign powers with military support from the colonizing nations to secure their colonies. Common (British European) law replaced native (African) law. The capitalist British society, still in pre-industrial stages, sought agrarian means to self-sustain its colonies alongside other exploitative means. In 1889 Britain granted royal charters to two firms that merged to form the British South Africa Company as a vehicle for Imperial wealth extraction. This ushered in the commoditization of these native ancestral lands as instruments of economic gain through farming or mining for future european settlers in Zimbabwe.

Southern Rhodesia was under the chartered control of the British South Africa Company starting in the 1890s and became a self governed British colony in 1923. In the time leading up to the Land Apportionment Act of 1930, there were no legal barriers to land ownership by black Africans. Section 83 and 81 of the Southern Rhodesia Order in Council had established the right for natives to land ownership within the region, and also established the responsibility of the colonial state to provide land to the natives of the region.

However, that did not mean that land was easily accessible to native Africans in the region. In 1919, the Southern Rhodesia Privy Council took steps to limit land purchase to solely black South African migrants, seen as more capable of individual land tenure. The council had reasoned that exposure to white settlers in South Africa made these migrants more capable of adhering to the idea of individual land tenure, as opposed to communal ownership. The Privy Council sold these lands at higher prices, excluding local Africans from purchase, and also demanded recommendations for land tenure by missionaries before allowing purchase.

These recommendations were difficult to come by as missionaries tended to provide negative recommendations in an attempt to maintain religious control of their congregation. At the same time, the British South African Company in charge of administering the region refused to sell land to black Africans, in a total rejection of the Southern Rhodesia Order of 1898. In response, Africans began to buy land directly from white settlers or through third parties. Those who bought land through this method had to purchase at higher prices and pay fees to land agents, and tended to be wealthier than the general African population. This segment of the population were often those employed in higher wage positions such as catechism teachers connected to missionaries; the purchase of land allowed these individuals to accumulate more wealth and resources than others in the community.

== Land Apportionment Act of 1930: implementation ==
=== Push for legal restrictions ===
With agriculture growing increasingly important to Southern Rhodesia 's economy, white settlers began to see the practice of subsistence and small scale farming as an inappropriate use of farmland. As the initial focus on mineral extraction proved to result in little profit, land became the most valuable commodity for the new settlers. Black landowners were portrayed as incapable for what white settlers deemed profitable use, and these settlers began to push for not only segregation but access to more land for further agricultural development. Not all white settlers pushed for land segregation on racial terms; and at the times there were others who proposed legal segregation as a method for preventing future losses in African land holding by setting aside land exclusively for African use. Documents at the time also speak of a portion of the African population that accepted the 1930 Act, on the grounds that it would give them increased access to landownership and that segregation would prove beneficial to not only the white settlers.

In 1894, the first of many Land Commissions were established to deal with issues relation to African and white settler land ownership. The outcome, the establishment of two areas carved out of the state for native use, lead to a series of rebellions in 1896 that revealed the necessity of ensuring appropriate land access for natives. This resulted in the establishment of Native Reserves, defined without the necessary geographic understanding of the region and therefore created through conflicting guidelines. In 1925, the Morris Carter Commission concluded that the proper solution to issues of land allocation was the absolute segregation of land ownership between the white and black populations. This resulted in the Land Apportionment Act of 1930, passed by Southern Rhodesian Legislature that year and accepted by the Imperial British government in 1931.

=== Implementation ===
The Land Apportionment Act of 1930 segregated land ownership by segmenting certain areas within the country to be for either white or African land ownership. The act initially set aside 19.9 million hectares for European white settlers, with 3 million hectares claimed for the native population; this 3 million was later expanded into 8.8 million hectares, and was soon the only land outside of reservations available to sixty percent of the population. The remaining lands were set aside for future use. At the time the act was passed, the European population was assumed to be around 50,000 and the native population was estimated at 1,081,000 people. The European population was granted approximately 50 percent of the land, with the African population being provided 29.8 percent of the land.

Lands allocated to white settlers tended to consist of richer soils and higher rainfall, ultimately seen as lands with higher production potential. Natives who had settled onto what were now white-only territories were forced to relinquish their land rights and expected to subside on overcrowded reservations. Africans were only allowed to purchase land in Native Purchase Areas, regions situated at the border of native reservations. The lands available for purchase were far from the technical services and resources needed for proper farming, with some lacking access to water or suffering from overuse and soil erosion. These lands were considered to be poorer in quality and less valuable, and only a few individuals were able to acquire land through these methods. The majority of Africans were forced to access land through what was known as customary tenure in Native Reserves.

The Act itself was amended in 1936 and 1941, and continued to be repeatedly amended in the years that followed.

== Legacy and consequences ==
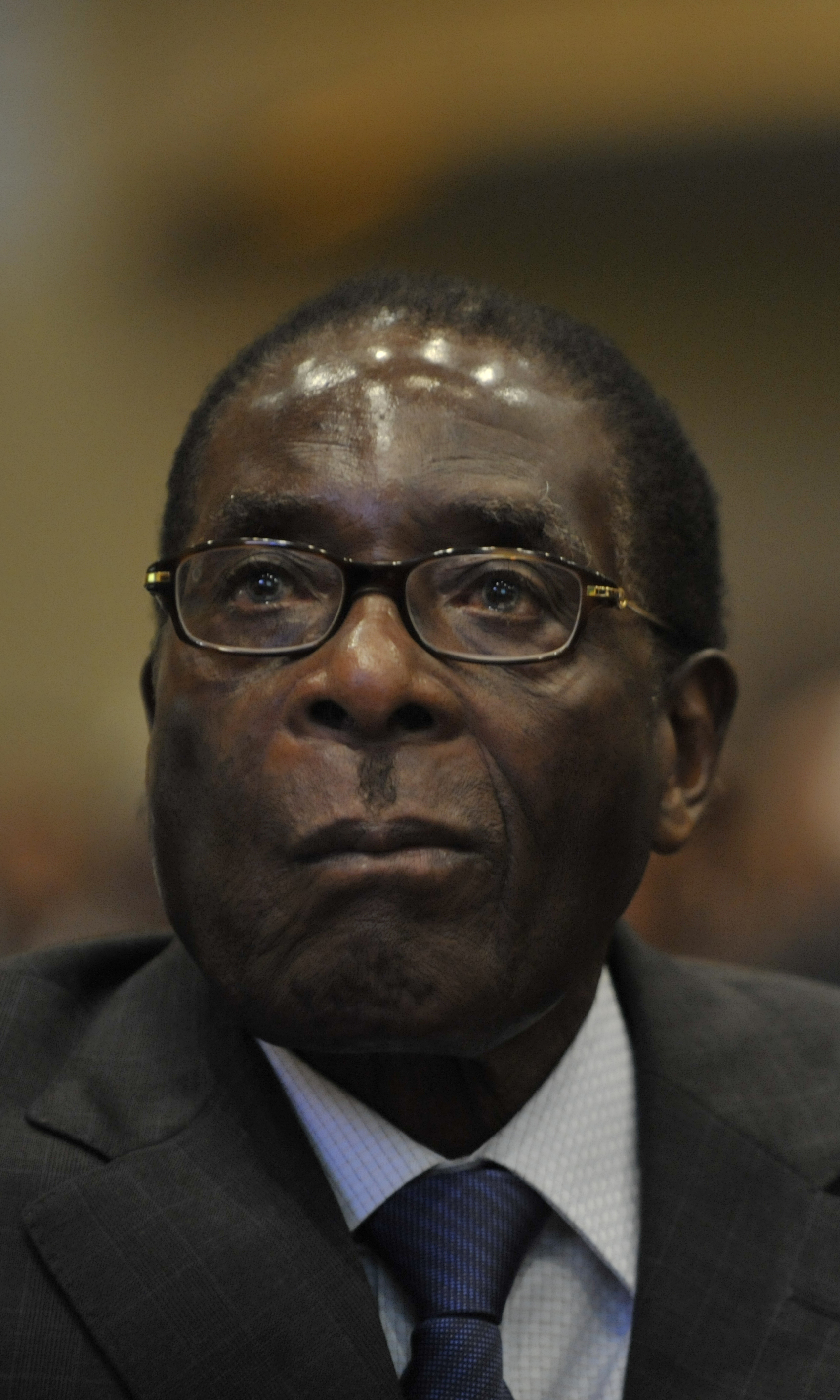
Robert Mugabe, previous president of Zimbabwe, under which there were attempts to reform land ownership in the 2000s.

=== Immediate consequences ===
The Land Apportionment Act limited quality land access, resulting in the overcrowding of Africans on native reserves, limited resources, and poverty. This destroyed the native reserve economy, limiting the social or economic advancement of Africans while allowing white settlers to profit. The Act ultimately led to a decline in agricultural production for native peoples, which added to the growing inequality. This in turn caused food shortages within the reserves, with individuals unable to engage in profitable farming. To make matters worse, large portions of the land allotted to white settlers were unused, and left to fallow. Within twenty years, the Land Apportionment Act had created a crisis in terms of population size and ecological damage on the native reserves.

Off the Native Reserves, the Land Apportionment Act limited the ability for black Africans to live in urban centers, being that the only land available to them was connected to Native Purchase Areas. Towns and urban centers became dominated by white settlers, and black Zimbabweans who became the majority population were forced to live in townships miles from cities where they were able to rent. This led to the development of townships for Africans that worked and provided services for white urban centers, or towns. Land access was therefore tied to attempts by the colonial, and white settler majority, to limit African mobility and residence.

=== Pushes for reform ===
Issues of land ownership continue to affect political and social life. As the 1930 Land Apportionment Act became entrenched into the history of white settlement within Southern Rhodesia, attempts to address the issues it created continued to push for land segregation and the limitation of African migration. In 1951, the white majority passed the Native Land Husbandry Act in order to create a landless peasant population that would aid in the industrialization of the state. The act also established strict guidelines on grazing, land allocation, and ownership rights within the reserves, in hopes of increasing agriculture production. The result was a continued limitation on African land ownership, and increasing hostility toward the settler administration.

The Rhodesian Referendum of 1969, in which white settlers attempted to create a white minority country, moved to update the 1930 act through additions like the Property Owners (Residential Protection) Act, which gave the right to remove individuals of a race different to that of the majority in the surrounding areas. Therefore, a black landowner surrounded by white landowners could be legally asked to remove themselves and relinquish their land rights in order to protect the surrounding landowners. Following legislation such as the Land Tenure Act of 1969 were later altered during the civil war in 1977, opening the way for black land ownership outside of the limits of The Land Apportionment Act of 1930. As the push for independence from the white majority grew, the issue of land became a focal point for the development of nationalism and rebellion. Nearing the end of the Rhodesian Bush War, land reform was addressed in the Lancaster House Agreement of 1979 through the creation of a fund that compensated white farmers who lost their lands in future government led land reforms.

Post independence, land ownership and land reform have continued to dominate. After independence, there was an increasing push for equitable distribution of the land in an attempt to correct colonial injustices. White farmers still owned a disproportionate amount of viable land, and profited from a dominant position in agricultural production. Previous President Mugabe made steps to transfer land ownership to black civilians after independence, with varied results. The issue intensified, with the 2000s witnessing an attempt by the Zimbabwe government, along with peasant farmers, youth, and veterans, to seize land from white settlers. This resulted in the seizure of 10 million hectares, or 90 percent of all farms, without compensation to title holding landowners. Issues with land reform now center on equalizing the distribution of land and generating solutions to decades of unequal land accumulation of white settlers and elites in power.
