= Operation Miracle (Rhodesia) =

Battle

Operation Miracle (or the Battle of Mavonde)
- Part of the Rhodesian Bush War (or Second Chimurenga)
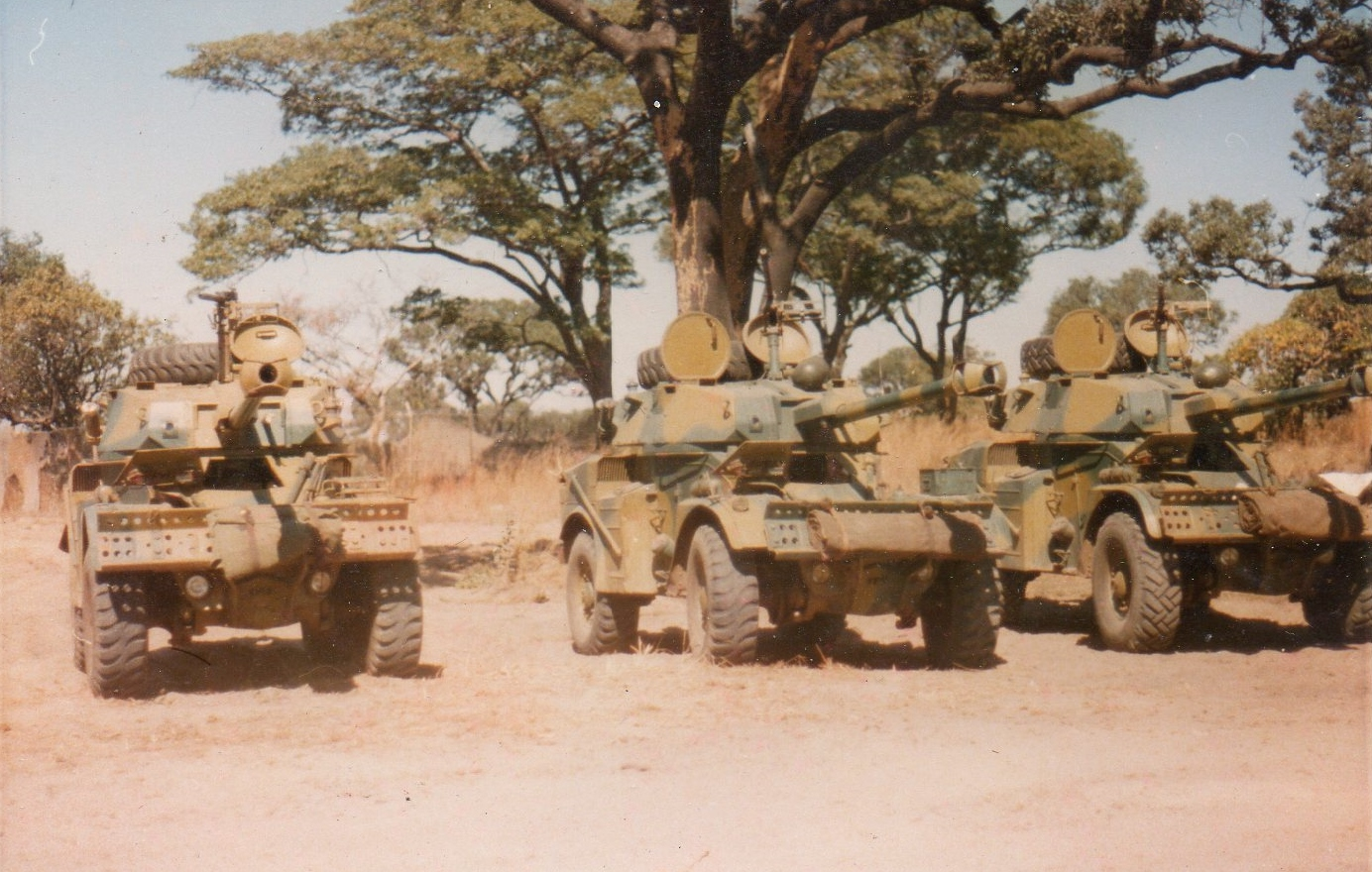
- Eland-90 armoured cars of the Rhodesian Armoured Corps
Date	27 September – 6 October 1979
Location	Chimoio Circle, People's Republic of Mozambique
Result	Rhodesian Victory

Belligerents
Zimbabwe Rhodesia	ZANLA; FRELIMO

Commanders and leaders
Lt. Gen Peter Walls; Lt. Col Ron Reid-Daly; Capt. Richard Passaportis; Gp Cap. Norman Walsh	Solomon Mujuru; Paradzai Zimondi; Josiah Tungamirai

Units involved
Rhodesian Army; Selous Scouts; RLI; RAC; Rhodesian SAS; RhAF; No.1 Squadron; No.5 Squadron	Mavonde base

Strength
100 Selous Scouts; 100 RLI; 6 Eland Mk 6 Armoured cars 20 Unimogs; 1 (Pig) Armoured Command car 4 Canberras; 4 Hawker Hunters; 4 Alouette III (1 K-Car) (3 G-Cars) several Impala (ZANLA claims)	6,000; 4 tanks (T-55s)

Casualties and losses
8 killed 3 wounded 1 Canberra and 1 Hawker Hunter shot down 1 Alouette III crashed	ZANLA: more than 1000; Frelimo: 1 tank destroyed

Operation Miracle, or the Battle of Mavonde, was a military raid in 1979 by the Rhodesian Security Forces (RSF) against ZANLA guerrilla bases in Mozambique towards the end of the Rhodesian Bush War. ZANLA put up stiff resistance, although at the cost of many losses with as many as hundreds dead. The tactical success of the RSF did not lead to the expected strategic changes but did result in a decisive tactical victory with few losses.

== Background ==
After successful Rhodesian air attacks on ZANLA bases, such as Operation Snoopy, the guerillas chose to set up a new camp under the shelter of the forest near Mavonde, 20km from the Rhodesian border; far away from Chimoio. As the Lancaster House discussions were taking place, RSF attempted to annihilate this base, hoping to weaken ZANLA's position.

The base was held by 6,000 ZANLA partisans, with many anti-aircraft weapons on hills. Many guns were located on the highest hill, later to be nicknamed "Monte Cassino." Two secondary hills, Hill 774 and Hill 761, were also dotted with anti-aircraft guns. These weapons were supplied by the Ethiopian Derg. Trenches were dug in the 64-square-kilometres' surface of the camp. The base was commanded by Solomon Mujuru, known by his nom-de-guerre, Rex Nhongo.

Small-scale Rhodesian patrols erroneously estimated the ZANLA force to be 2,000 men strong; so 200 Rhodesian soldiers were earmarked for the operation, with 100 men of the Selous Scouts spearheading the raid. Each of the ten-men strike-teams was transported in a Unimog truck. Lieutenant Colonel Brian Robinson and Wing Commander Norman Welsh were the overall commanders of the operation which the Rhodesians had codenamed Operation Miracle. Captain Richard Passaportis commanded the column on the ground which contained 20 Unimogs, protected by Eland-90 armoured cars of the Rhodesian Armoured Corps. A detachment of QF 25-pounder guns was also part of the column. The Selous Scouts were supported by 100 men of the Rhodesian Light Infantry (2 Commando, 3 Commando, and Support Commando), air-dropped 10 kilometers away from the camp.

== Targets ==
Mavonde Base in 1979 had grown to encompass around 60 square kilometers.

- Base 1 - Command HQ
- Base 2 - Security (for prisoners of war and cadres undergoing disciplinary punishment)
- Base 3 - Training for recruits who would have joined from Rhodesia
- Base 4 - Transit base for those who would have completed their training in such countries as Yugoslavia, Ethopia, and other such countries awaiting deployment to the war front or to be fed in other bases within the camp

== Operation ==
Due to bad weather, the start of operations had to be delayed by several days.

=== First day ===
Before attacking the base, the RSF ground forces had to cross a river. The artillery was bogged down, and the guerillas were alerted to the size of the column. On 26 September 1979, (it was a Wednesday), the Rhodesian forces pounced on the Mavonde camp, first by the use of fighter jets which were subsequently supported by the Rhodesian amoured regiment, paratroopers, Support Commando and infantry. The column was stopped by ZANLA fire. ZANLA was by then heavily armed with 1; 2; 3 barrel anti air and other heavy machine guns. It was no longer the same as when the Rhodesians attacked Chimoio and Nyadzonya. This time around, the ZANLA force was more professional and the absence of civilians in the camp helped them in the war. The first wave of the Selous Scouts began clearing the trenches, but the rest of the column only arrived late in the afternoon. Meanwhile, the air-dropped Rhodesian Light Infantry joined the battle, and Mpunzarima, a key ZANLA military leader, was killed in action. On the first day of war, at night, Rex Nhongo commanded Tonderai Nyika (Paradzai Zimondi) and Fox Shebba Gava (Vitalis Zvinavashe) to go and inform Frelimo that the ZANLA camp at Mavonde was under heavy fire and bombardment from Rhodesian forces. Meanwhile food was being cooked in the bunkers at night and troops fed during the night, knowing that at sunrise, the war was going to continue. At dawn, Nhongo distributed marijuana to some of his troops to reduce their stress. The Rhodesian troops were harassed during the night by RPG-7s, recoilless-rifles and mortars.

=== Second day ===
The RSF force renewed its assault. Nhongo personally went to the front to boost the morale of his troops, using a big stick to hit those reluctant to fight. Guided by a Reims Cessna "Lynx" aircraft, Hawker Hunter attack jets neutralised ZANLA fortifications in Hill 774. The position was taken at 3 p.m. by a troop of the Selous Scouts. English Electric Canberra bombers also bombed the anti-aircraft positions.

=== Third day ===
During the night, RSF artillery fired at ZANLA positions to prevent the partisans from sleeping. At 10 a.m., two troops of Selous Scouts and a RLI section (around 100 men) led an assault on Monte Cassino. The summit was taken after the partisans had retreated, as was Hill 761. The war continued as ZANLA forces stayed put. The routine of cooking food at night continued.

=== Fourth Day ===
ZANLA continued to repulse the advances of the Rhodesian forces. At some stages, the anti air gun operators would change the bullets and fit the guns with amour-piercing bullets and several armoured cars were burnt. Rex Nhongo would move from base to base, from gun position to another giving commands to his troops. This boosted the morale of the soldiers. At the end of that day, some commanders felt the Rhodesian forces fire was becoming too much and they felt that it was time their commander Nhongo left the base. Before he left, in the company of a platoon, Rex Nhongo ordered his fighters to retreat, should the heavy bombardment continue. It was then that news was received that Frelimo had sent support. During the late night, ZANLA was commanded to do a tactical withdrawal. FRELIMO had sent troops, anti air guns and 40-barrel BM-21 Grad rocket launcher (commonly referred to as Katjusha Multiple Rocket Launcher). T-34 or T-54 tanks and a squad of infantry to support the rebels, but RSF 25-pounders quickly reacted, guided by Rhodesian SAS, and the tanks retreated after the lead tank was put out of action.

=== Fifth Day ===
The war continued; this time Rhodesian forces against two forces; the ZANLA forces and the FRELIMO soldiers. On this day several Rhodesian aircraft were burnt down by the FRELIMO soldiers. When the ZANLA forces had tactically retreated, the Rhodesian soldiers occupied the camp and when the FRELIMO soldiers arrived, those Rhodesians who could, left the camp hurriedly; but most were trapped in the base and their equipment was taken. Day six marked the final withdrawal of the Rhodesian forces

== Consequences ==
The Rhodesian force withdrew on the morning of 2 October, taking captured equipment with them. To avoid retaliation attacks from Mozambique, the Rhodesian Air Force bombed FRELIMO facilities, but one Canberra and one Hunter were shot down. ZANLA suffered hundreds of casualties but was largely intact. The battle had no consequences for the Lancaster House discussions.
