= Nhari rebellion =

1974 rebellion against Zimbabwe leadership

The Nhari Rebellion occurred in November 1974, amidst the Rhodesian Bush War, when members of the Zimbabwe African National Liberation Army (ZANLA) in Chifombo, Zambia (near the border with Mozambique) rebelled against the leadership of the political party it was attached to, the Zimbabwe African National Union (ZANU).

The uprising was led by Thomas Nhari (from whom it takes its name), and supported by Noel Mukono and Simpson Mutambanengwe. Nhari and his followers were motivated by the belief that the members of the ZANU High Command, based in Lusaka, were leading an overly extravagant lifestyle, contrary to the party's Maoist principles. Ken Flower, the head of the Rhodesian Central Intelligence Organisation, sponsored the rebellion, which was carried out by "willing conspirators".

== Aftermath ==
The rebellion ultimately proved to be unsuccessful, with the rebellious guerrillas being forcibly put down by ZANU defence chief Josiah Tongogara.
