= Alamein Farm =

Large farm located in Beatrice

- Interactive map of Alamein Farm
- Town/City: Beatrice
- Province: Mashonaland East
- Country: Zimbabwe
- Coordinates: 18°19′32″S 30°47′52″E
- Area: 5,000 hectares (12,000 acres)
- Produces: Maize, Rhodes grass, tobacco

Alamein Farms, also known as Ruzambu Farm, is a 5,000 hectare farm at Beatrice, in the Mashonaland East area of Zimbabwe, 72 km south of the capital Harare. It was a highly productive commercial farming operation, employing around one thousand people and producing large quantities of tobacco, maize and Rhodes grass, as well as cattle and farmed game. The farm gained notoriety in 2002, when General Solomon Mujuru and his wife, Zimbabwean Vice President Joice Mujuru, evicted the farm owner and all farm inhabitants under the auspices of the Land Reform Programme, and became the first of President Robert Mugabe's inner circle to be found guilty of unlawful land seizures. Under General Mujuru, the farm continued to produce tobacco, maize and game. Farm workers also produced their own tobacco on land allocated to them.

Further notoriety was to follow in August 2011, with the death of General Mujuru in the farm homestead in circumstances that many commentators and politicians describe as suspicious.
