= SADC Tribunal =

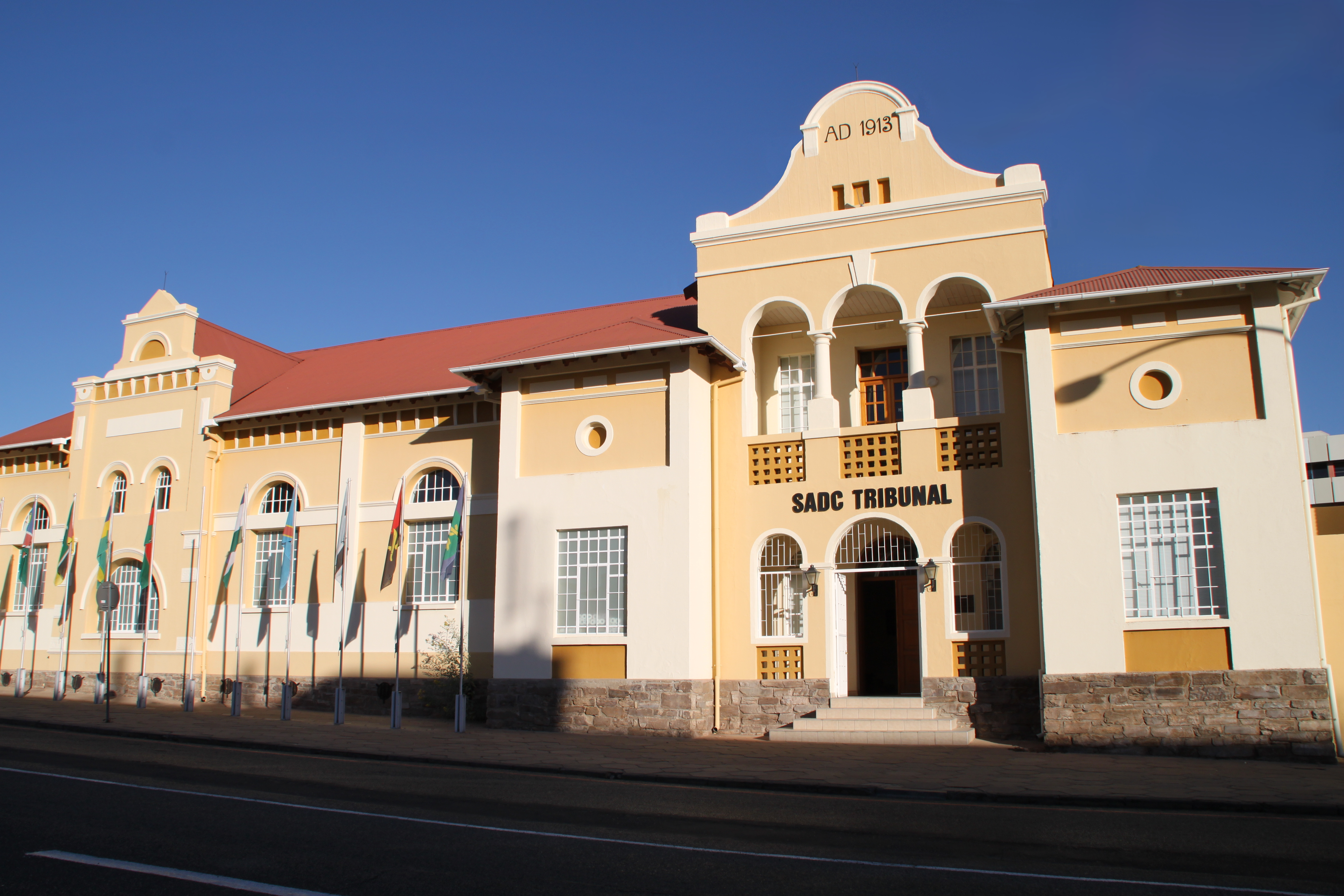
Windhoek's historic Turnhalle building, seat of the SADC Tribunal

The SADC Tribunal was a court and the highest policy institution of the Southern African Development Community (SADC). It was housed in the Turnhalle building in Windhoek, the capital of Namibia. Although established on paper since 1992, members of the Tribunal were only appointed during the SADC Summit in 2005. On 18 November 2005 the Tribunal was inaugurated and the members were sworn in by Peter Shivute, chief justice of Namibia of the Namibian Supreme Court.

Before the first case was heard by the Tribunal, the Turnhalle burned down on 18 January 2007. The court room was completely destroyed. Reconstruction work started in November 2007.

== Key decisions ==
In one of its first cases, Mike Campbell (Pvt) Ltd and Others v Republic of Zimbabwe the Tribunal decided in 2007 and 2008 that the government of Zimbabwe may not evict farmer Mike Campbell from his land, and that farm evictions per Amendment 17 of Zimbabwe's constitution amount to de facto discrimination against Whites. Following this decision, Zimbabwe pulled out of the SADC Tribunal, challenging its legitimacy. The 2010 SADC summit then ordered a review of the "functions and [...] terms of reference of the SADC Tribunal", a step that a group of legal and human rights organizations describes as "virtually suspending" this inter-regional court. During this time of reorganisation the Tribunal had only four of ten judges appointed and did not accept nor hear any cases.

== Dissolution ==
The 2012 SADC summit resolved to limit the jurisdiction of the Tribunal to "disputes between member states" and so barred cases from individuals and companies to bring cases. Until 2012, only individuals had approached the Tribunal. SADC member states normally do not take each other to court so the necessity of the institution is now doubtful. The SADC resolution was described as effectively "neuter[ing]" the Tribunal, and has been condemned by various groups. Later that year SADC disbanded the Tribunal altogether.

== Judges ==
Ivy Kamanga, who is a supreme court judge in Malawi, was a judge at the Southern African Development Community Administrative Tribunal.
