= Reformed Church in Zimbabwe =

The Reformed Church in Zimbabwe was founded by Dutch Reformed Church in South Africa missionaries on the 9th of September 1891. Andrew A. Louw begun to preach in the area near Morgenster among Shona people. The worship language of churches was Afrikaans and English. Later the denomination expanded among Nyanja people. In 1999 a new mission field was opened in Binga District, this mission field became a 'missionary' congregation in 2008 with 12 preaching posts, 12 more were added in evangelism campaigns of 2013-14, today the area has 2 congregations both with their own ministers. The young Church was administered from South Africa under the Dutch Reformed Church Cape Synod, eventually, the African Reformed Church in Rhodesia came into being, as an indigenous and independent church, under the control of church councils, four presbyteries and a synod. In 1977 it became the fully autonomous African Reformed Church. Soon after the country's independence in 1980, the name was changed to Reformed Church in Zimbabwe. Some historic church structures are still referred to as Dutch Reformed Churches and some Reformed Church members still use that name. The R.C.Z subscribes to the Heidelberg Catechism, Belgic Confession, and the Canons of Dort as its doctrinal standard. The R.C.Z is a member of the World Council of Churches (WCC entry), the Zimbabwe Council of Churches. In addition to its various church activities, the church has a special concern for its schools namely Henry Murray School for the deaf in Morgenster, and the Margaretha Hugo School (Copota) for the blind in Zimuto. The RCZ is also the responsible authority for a number of primary and secondary schools, a teacher-training college, Murray Theological College and the Reformed Church University (RCU) in Masvingo, as well as two hospitals and several clinics.

The RCZ is a Reformed Faith-based organization. The Reformed faith is centered on the Bible and believer's personal relationship with God through Christ. Reformation stresses on divine grace and justification by faith. Accordingly, priesthood belongs to every believer and not to the religious hierarchy. Therefore, every common person should enjoy unhindered access to the Word of God, which is the priestly authority for every believer. Scripture and only Scripture is the sole religious authority for the Christian. Reformation is therefore continual and holistic based on new revelations revealed to the believer and the church through the Word of God.

By 2019 had over 80 congregations and 250 house fellowships and about 100,000 members, the Church continues the grow especially in Gweru, Kwekwe, Masvingo, Harare and also in mission and evangelism target areas of Binga, Siakobvu, Karoi, Kariba and Mutoko.

Notable People

Rev A A Louw the founding minister of the RCZ, Rev H Murray a minister of Scottish heritage initiated the establishment of Murray Theological College, Ezra Shumba the first minister trained at Murray Theological College.

.
