= Land reform in Zimbabwe =

Reallocation of land belonging to white farmers in Zimbabwe

Land reform in Zimbabwe began in 1980 under the Lancaster House Agreement following internationally recognised independence, aiming to redistribute land from white commercial farmers to black subsistence farmers. White farmers dominated the commercial agricultural sector, which accounted for a large share of exports and formal employment. Land hunger was a key issue during the Rhodesian Bush War. The Lancaster House framework, which ended the war, allowed land acquisition on a “willing buyer, willing seller” basis, with the United Kingdom funding half of the cost.

In the late 1990s, when British funding ended, the Zimbabwean government led by Robert Mugabe launched a “fast-track” land reform programme, involving the forcible seizure of white-owned farms. The programme was criticised for violence, contested boundaries, inadequate resettlement and compensation, and was followed by a sharp decline in agricultural production and exports. Land reform had a serious negative effect on the Zimbabwean economy during the 2000s. By 2013, almost all white-owned farms had been expropriated. Compulsory acquisition without compensation was formally discontinued in 2018 following the ousting of Mugabe, and later efforts focused on compensating dispossessed farmers.

== Background ==
The foundation for the controversial land dispute in Zimbabwean society was laid at the beginning of European settlement of the region, which had long been the scene of mass movements by various Bantu peoples. In the sixteenth century, Portuguese explorers had successfully attempted to open up Zimbabwe for trading purposes, but the country was not permanently settled by European immigrants until three hundred years later. The Changamire Dynasty forcibly removed many Portuguese traders from their stations in Rozvi in 1693 to 1695 during a campaign against Mutapa. The Rozvi Empire remained in power until 1850 until they were destroyed by the Ngoni Kingdom and Ndebele tribes during Mfecane.

Most Shona cultures had a theoretically communal attitude towards land ownership; the later European concept of officiating individual property ownership was unheard of. Land was considered the collective property of all the residents in a given chiefdom, with the chief mediating disagreements and issues pertaining to its use. Nevertheless, male household heads frequently reserved personal tracts for their own cultivation, and allocated smaller tracts to each of their wives. Population growth frequently resulted in the over-utilisation of the existing land, which became greatly diminished both in terms of cultivation and grazing due to the larger number of people attempting to share the same acreage.

During the early nineteenth century, the Shona were conquered by the Northern Ndebele (also known as the Matabele), which began the process of commodifying Zimbabwe's land. Although the Ndebele elite were uninterested in cultivation, land ownership was considered one major source of an individual's wealth and power—the others being cattle and slaves. Ndebele monarchs acquired large swaths of land for themselves accordingly.

=== Legal situation in Southern Rhodesia ===
==== European settlement patterns ====
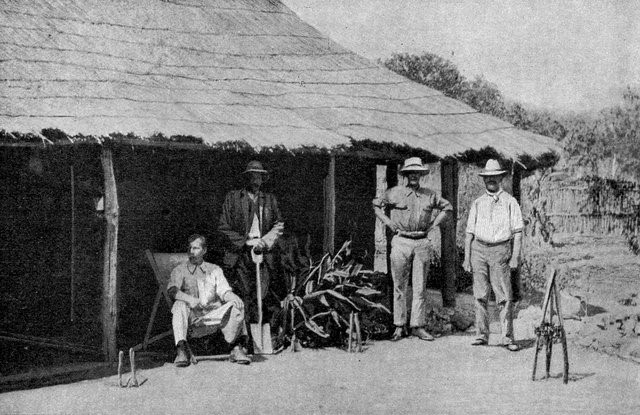
White farmers in Southern Rhodesia, early 1920s.

The first white colonists to settle in modern-day Zimbabwe arrived during the 19th century, primarily from the Cape Colony (modern-day South Africa), less than a century after the Ndebele invasions. This reflected a larger trend of permanent European settlement in the milder, drier regions of Southern Africa as opposed to the tropical and sub-tropical climates further north. In 1889 Cecil Rhodes and the British South Africa Company (BSAC) introduced the earliest white settlers to Zimbabwe as prospectors, seeking concessions from the Ndebele for mineral rights. Collectively known as the Pioneer Column, the settlers established the city of Salisbury, now Harare. Rhodes hoped to discover gold and establish a mining colony, but the original intention had to be modified as neither the costs nor the returns on the overhead capital matched the original projections. Local gold deposits failed to yield the massive returns which the BSAC had promised its investors, and the military costs of the expedition had caused a deficit. An interim solution was the granting of land to the settlers in the hopes that they would develop productive farms and generate enough income to justify the colony's continued administrative costs. The region was demarcated as Southern Rhodesia after 1898.

Between 1890 and 1896, the BSAC granted an area encompassing 16 million acres—about one sixth the area of Southern Rhodesia—to European immigrants. By 1913 this had been extended to 21.5 million acres. However, these concessions were strictly regulated, and land was only offered to those individuals able to prove they had the necessary capital to develop it. Exceptions were made during the Ndebele and Shona insurrections against the BSAC in the mid-1890s, when land was promised to any European men willing to take up arms in defence of the colony, irrespective of their financial status. The settlers of the Pioneer Column were granted tracts of 3,150 acres apiece, with an option to purchase more land from the BSAC's holdings at relatively low prices (up to fifteen times cheaper than comparable land on the market in South Africa).

==== Creation of the Tribal Trust Lands ====
Friction soon arose between the settlers and the Ndebele and Shona peoples, both in terms of land apportionment and economic competition. In 1900, Southern Rhodesia's black population owned an estimated 55,000 head of cattle, while European residents owned fewer than 12,000. Most of the pastureland was being grazed by African-owned cattle, accordingly. However, in less than two decades the Ndebele and Shona came to own over a million head of cattle, with white farmers owning another million as well. As the amount of available pasture for the livestock quickly dwindled, accompanied by massive amounts of overgrazing and erosion, land competition between the three groups became intense. A number of successive land commissions were thus appointed to study the problem and apportion the land.

The colonial government in Southern Rhodesia delineated the country into five distinct farming regions which corresponded roughly to rainfall patterns. Region I comprised an area in the eastern highlands with markedly higher rainfall best suited to the cultivation of diversified cash crops such as coffee and tea. Region II was highveld, also in the east, where the land could be used intensively for grain cultivation such as maize, tobacco, and wheat. Region III and Region IV endured periodic drought and were regarded as suitable for livestock, in addition to crops which required little rainfall. Region V was lowveld and unsuitable for crop cultivation due to its dry nature; however, limited livestock farming was still viable. Land ownership in these regions was determined by race under the terms of the Southern Rhodesian Land Apportionment Act, passed in 1930, which reserved Regions I, II, and III for white settlement. Region V and a segment of Region II which possessed greater rainfall variability were organised into the Tribal Trust Lands (TTLs), reserved solely for black African ownership and use. This created two new problems: firstly, in the areas reserved for whites, the ratio of land to population was so high that many farms could not be exploited to their fullest potential, and some prime white-owned farmland was lying idle. Secondly, the legislation resulted in enforced overuse of the land in the TTLs due to overpopulation there.

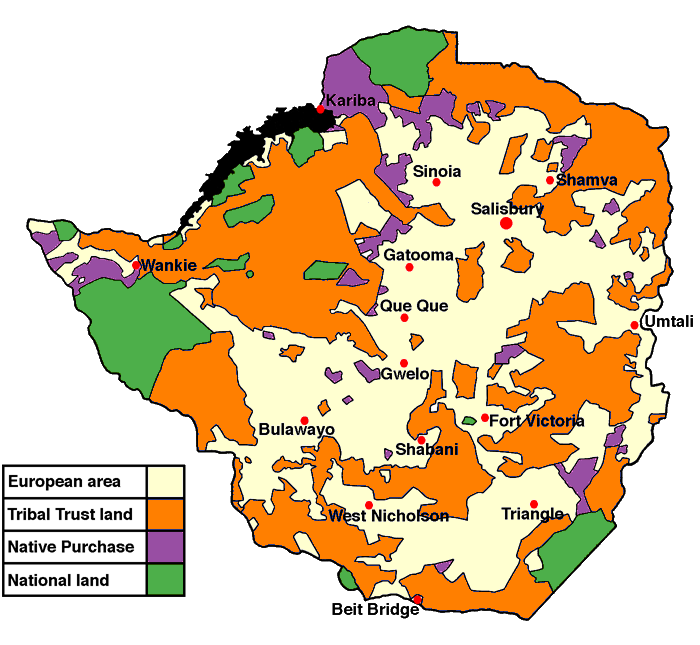
Land apportionment in Rhodesia in 1965.

The Southern Rhodesian Land Apportionment Act reserved 49 million acres for white ownership and left 17.7 million acres of land unassigned to either the white preserve or the TTLs. While a survey undertaken by the colony's Land Commission in concert with the British government in 1925 found that the vast majority of black Rhodesians supported some form of geographic segregation, including the reservation of land exclusively for their use, many were disillusioned by the manner in which the legislation was implemented in explicit favour of whites. The overcrowded conditions in the TTLs compelled large numbers of Shona and Ndebele alike to abandon their rural livelihoods and seek wage employment in the cities or on white commercial farms. Those who remained on tracts in the TTLs found themselves having to cope with topsoil depletion due to overuse; large amounts of topsoil were stripped of their vegetation cover and rendered unproductive as a consequence. To control the rate of erosion, colonial authorities introduced voluntary destocking initiatives for livestock. When these met with little success, the destocking programme became mandatory in 1941, forcing all residents of the TTLs to sell or slaughter animals declared surplus. Another 7.2 million acres were also set aside for sale to black farmers, known as the Native Purchase Areas.

During the early 1950s, Southern Rhodesia passed the African Land Husbandry Act, which attempted to reform the communal system in the TTLs by giving black Africans the right to apply for formal title deeds to specific tracts. This legislation proved so unpopular and difficult to enforce that incoming Rhodesian Prime Minister Ian Smith ordered its suspension in the mid-1960s. Smith's administration subsequently recognised the traditional leaders of each chiefdom as the final authority on land allocation in the TTLs.

Following Rhodesia's Unilateral Declaration of Independence, land legislation was again amended with the Rhodesian Land Tenure Act of 1969. The Land Tenure Act upended the Land Apportionment Act of 1930 and was designed to rectify the issue of insufficient land available to the rapidly expanding black population. It reduced the amount of land reserved for white ownership to 45 million acres and reserved another 45 million acres for black ownership, introducing parity in theory; however, the most fertile farmland in Regions I, II, and III continued to be included in the white enclave. Abuses of the system continued to abound; some white farmers took advantage of the legislation to shift their property boundaries into land formerly designated for black settlement, often without notifying the other landowners. A related phenomenon was the existence of black communities, especially those congregated around missions, which were oblivious to the legislation and unwittingly squatting on land redesignated for white ownership. The land would be sold in the meantime, and the government obliged to evict the preexisting occupants. These incidents and others were instrumental in eliciting sympathy among Rhodesia's black population for nationalist movements such as the Zimbabwe African National Union (ZANU) and the Zimbabwe African People's Union (ZAPU), which sought to overthrow the Rhodesian government by force of arms.

==== Bush War and Lancaster House ====
The escalation of the Rhodesian Bush War in the 1970s led to a significant amount of rural displacement and interrupted agricultural activity. The disruption of veterinary services resulted in massive livestock losses, and the cultivation of cash crops was hampered by guerrilla raids. The murder of about three hundred white farmers during the war, as well as the conscription of hundreds of others into the Rhodesian Security Forces, also led to a drop in the volume of agricultural production. Between 1975 and 1976 Rhodesia's urban population doubled as thousands of rural dwellers, mostly from TTLs, fled to the cities to escape the fighting. A campaign of systematic villagisation followed as the Rhodesian Army shifted segments of the black population into guarded settlements to prevent their subversion by the insurgents.

In 1977, the Land Tenure Act was amended by the Rhodesian parliament, which further reduced the amount of land reserved for white ownership to 200,000 hectares, or 500,000 acres. Over 15 million hectares were thus opened to purchase by persons of any race. Two years later, as part of the Internal Settlement, Zimbabwe Rhodesia's incoming biracial government under Bishop Abel Muzorewa abolished the reservation of land according to race. White farmers continued to own 73.8% of the most fertile land suited for intensive cash crop cultivation and livestock grazing, in addition to generating 80% of the country's total agricultural output. This was a vital contribution to the economy, which was still underpinned by its agricultural exports.

Land reform emerged as a critical issue during the Lancaster House Talks to end the Rhodesian Bush War. ZANU leader Robert Mugabe and ZAPU leader Joshua Nkomo insisted on the redistribution of land—by compulsory seizure, without compensation—as a precondition to a negotiated peace settlement. This was reflective of prevailing attitudes in their guerrilla armies, the Zimbabwe African National Liberation Army (ZANLA) and Zimbabwe People's Revolutionary Army (ZIPRA) respectively, and rural support bases, which had high expectations of the redistribution of land. The British government, which mediated the talks, proposed a constitutional clause underscoring property ownership as an inalienable right to prevent a mass exodus of white farmers and the economic collapse of the country. This was enshrined in Section 16 of the Zimbabwean Constitution, 1980. To secure Mugabe and Nkomo's support for the constitutional agreement, Lord Carrington announced that the United Kingdom would be prepared to assist land resettlement with technical assistance and financial aid. The Secretary-General of the Commonwealth of Nations, Sir Shridath Ramphal, also received assurances from the American ambassador in London, Kingman Brewster, that the United States would likewise contribute capital for "a substantial amount for a process of land redistribution and they would undertake to encourage the British government to give similar assurances".

The Lancaster House Agreement stipulated that farms could only be taken from whites on a "willing buyer, willing seller" principle for at least ten years. White farmers were not to be placed under any pressure or intimidation, and if they decided to sell their farms they were allowed to determine their own asking prices. Exceptions could be made if the farm was unoccupied and not being used for agricultural activity.

Southern Rhodesia's independence was finally recognised as the Republic of Zimbabwe on April 18, 1980. As Zimbabwe's first prime minister, Mugabe reaffirmed his commitment to land reform. The newly created Zimbabwean Ministry of Lands, Resettlement, and Redevelopment announced later that year that land reform would be necessary to alleviate overpopulation in the former TTLs, extend the production potential of small-scale subsistence farmers, and improve the standards of living of rural blacks. Its stated goals were to ensure abandoned or under-utilised land was being exploited to its fullest potential, and provide opportunities for unemployed, landless peasants.

== Phases of land reform ==
=== Willing Seller, Willing Buyer ===
Despite extensive financial assistance from the UK, the first phase of Zimbabwe's land reform programme was widely regarded as unsuccessful. Zimbabwe was only able to acquire 3 million hectares (7.41 million acres) for black resettlement, well short of its intended target of 8 million hectares (19.77 million acres). This land was redistributed to about 50,000 households. Many former supporters of the nationalist movements felt that the promises of Nkomo and Mugabe with regards to the land had not been truly fulfilled. This sentiment was especially acute in Matabeleland, where the legacy of the Southern Rhodesian Land Apportionment Act was more disadvantageous to black Zimbabweans than other parts of the country.

Funds earmarked for the purchase of white farms were frequently diverted into defence expenditure throughout the mid-1980s, for which Zimbabwean officials received some criticism. Reduction of funding posed another dilemma: property prices were now beyond what the Ministry of Lands, Resettlement, and Redevelopment could afford to meet its goals. It was also unable to build sufficient roads, clinics, and schools for the large number of people it was resettling in new areas. After 1983, the domestic budget could no longer sustain resettlement measures, and despite British aid the number of farms being purchased gradually declined for the remainder of the decade.

In 1986, the government of Zimbabwe cited financial restraints and an ongoing drought as the two overriding factors influencing the slow progress of land reform. However, it was also clear that within the Ministry of Lands, Resettlement, and Redevelopment itself there was a lack of initiative and trained personnel to plan and implement mass resettlements. Parliament passed the Land Acquisition Act in 1985, which gave the government first right to purchase excess land for redistribution to the landless. It empowered the government to claim tracts adjacent to the former TTLs (now known simply as "Communal Areas") and mark them for resettlement purposes, provided the owners could be persuaded to sell.

Between April 1980 and September 1987, the acreage of land occupied by white-owned commercial farms was reduced by about 20%.

=== Compulsory acquisition ===
After the expiration of the entrenched constitutional conditions mandated by the Lancaster House Agreement in the early 1990s, Zimbabwe outlined several ambitious new plans for land reform. A National Land Policy was formally proposed and enshrined as the Zimbabwean Land Acquisition Act of 1992, which empowered the government to acquire any land as it saw fit, although only after payment of financial compensation. While powerless to challenge the acquisition itself, landowners were permitted some lateral to negotiate their compensation amounts with the state. The British government continued to help fund the resettlement programme, with aid specifically earmarked for land reform reaching £91 million by 1996. Another £100 million was granted for "budgetary support" and was spent on a variety of projects, including land reform. Zimbabwe also began to court other donors through its Economic Structural Adjustment Policies (ESAP), which were projects implemented in concert with international agencies and tied to foreign loans.

The diversion of farms for personal use by Zimbabwe's political elite began to emerge as a crucial issue during the mid-1990s. Prime Minister Mugabe, who assumed an executive presidency in 1987, had urged restraint by enforcing a leadership code of conduct which barred members of the ruling party, ZANU–PF, from monopolising large tracts of farmland and then renting them out for profit. Local media outlets soon exposed huge breaches of the code by Mugabe's family and senior officials in ZANU–PF. Despite calls for accountability, the party members were never disciplined. Instead of being resettled by landless peasants, several hundred commercial farms acquired under the Land Acquisition Act continued to be leased out by politically connected individuals. In 1994, a disproportionate amount of the land being acquired was held by fewer than 600 black landowners, many of whom owned multiple properties. One study of commercial farms found that over half the redistributed land that year went to absentee owners otherwise unengaged in agriculture.

The perceived monopolisation of land by the ruling party provoked intense opposition from the ESAP donor states, which argued that those outside the patronage of ZANU-PF were unlikely to benefit. In 1996, party interests became even more inseparable from the issue of land reform when President Mugabe gave ZANU–PF's central committee overriding powers—superseding those of the Zimbabwean courts as well as the Ministry of Lands and Agriculture—to delegate on property rights. That year all farms marked for redistribution were no longer chosen or discussed by government ministries, but at ZANU–PF's annual congress.

In 1997 the government published a list of 1,471 farms it intended to buy compulsorily for redistribution. The list was compiled via a nationwide land identification exercise undertaken throughout the year. Landowners were given thirty days to submit written objections. Many farms were delisted and then re-listed as the Ministry of Lands and Agriculture debated the merits of acquiring various properties, especially those which ZANU–PF had ordered be expropriated for unspecified "political reasons". Of the 1,471 individual property acquisitions, about 1,200 were appealed to the courts by the farmowners due to various legal irregularities. President Mugabe responded by indicating that in his opinion land reform was a strictly political issue, not one to be questioned or debated by the judiciary.

The increasing politicisation of land reform was accompanied by the deterioration of diplomatic relations between Zimbabwe and the United Kingdom. Public opinion on the Zimbabwean land reform process among British citizens was decidedly mediocre; it was perceived as a poor investment on the part of the UK's government in an ineffectual and shoddily implemented programme. In June 1996, Lynda Chalker, British secretary of state for international development, declared that she could not endorse the new compulsory acquisition policy and urged Mugabe to return to the principles of "willing buyer, willing seller".

On 5 November 1997, Chalker's successor, Clare Short, described the new Labour government's approach to Zimbabwean land reform. She said that the UK did not accept that Britain had a special responsibility to meet the costs of land purchase in Zimbabwe. Notwithstanding the Lancaster House commitments, Short stated that her government was only prepared to support a programme of land reform that was part of a poverty eradication strategy. She had other questions regarding the way in which land would be acquired and compensation paid, and the transparency of the process. Her government's position was spelt out in a letter to Zimbabwe's Agriculture Minister, Kumbirai Kangai:

I should make it clear that we do not accept that Britain has a special responsibility to meet the costs of land purchase in Zimbabwe. We are a new government from diverse backgrounds without links to former colonial interests. My own origins are Irish and, as you know, we were colonised, not colonisers.

The letter concluded by stating that a programme of rapid land acquisition would be impossible to support, citing concern about the damage which this might do to Zimbabwe's agricultural output and its prospects of attracting investment.

Kenneth Kaunda, former president of Zambia, responded dismissively by saying "when Tony Blair took over in 1997, I understand that some young lady in charge of colonial issues within that government simply dropped doing anything about it."

In June 1998, the Zimbabwe government published its "policy framework" on the Land Reform and Resettlement Programme Phase II (LRRP II), which envisaged the compulsory purchase over five years of 50,000 square kilometres from the 112,000 square kilometres owned by white commercial farmers, public corporations, churches, non-governmental organisations and multinational companies. Broken down, the 50,000 square kilometres meant that every year between 1998 and 2003, the government intended to purchase 10,000 square kilometres for redistribution.

In September 1998, the government called a donors conference in Harare on LRRP II to inform the donor community and involve them in the program: Forty-eight countries and international organisations attended and unanimously endorsed the land program, saying it was essential for poverty reduction, political stability and economic growth. They agreed that the inception phase, covering the first 24 months, should start immediately, particularly appreciating the political imperative and urgency of the proposal.

The Commercial Farmers Union freely offered to sell the government 15,000 square kilometres for redistribution, but landowners once again dragged their feet. In response to moves by the National Constitutional Assembly, a group of academics, trade unionists and other political activists, the government drafted a new constitution. The draft was discussed widely by the public in formal meetings and amended to include restrictions on presidential powers, limits to the presidential term of office, and an age limit of 70 for presidential candidates. This was not seen as a suitable outcome for the government, so the proposals were amended to replace those clauses with one to compulsorily acquire land for redistribution without compensation. The opposition mostly boycotted the drafting stage of the constitution claiming that this new version was to entrench Mugabe politically.

Guerrilla veterans of the Zimbabwe African National Liberation Army (ZANLA) and Zimbabwe People's Revolutionary Army (ZIPRA) began to emerge as a radical force in the land issue around this time. The guerrillas forcefully presented their position that white-owned land in Zimbabwe was rightfully theirs, on account of promises made to them during the Rhodesian Bush War. Calls for accelerated land reform were also echoed by an affluent urban class of black Zimbabweans who were interested in making inroads into commercial farming, with public assistance.

=== Fast-track land reform and violence ===
"Under those [sic] Bippas [Bilateral Investment Promotion and Protection Agreements], which you allegedly say were violated, the only shortcoming was that we failed to raise the money to pay compensation, but there was no violation."

– Patrick Chinamasa, Zimbabwe Finance Minister (2014)

The government held a referendum on the new constitution on 12–13 February 2000, despite having a sufficiently large majority in parliament to pass any amendment it wished. Had it been approved, the new constitution would have empowered the government to acquire land compulsorily without compensation. Despite vast support in the media, the new constitution was defeated, 55% to 45%.

On 26–27 February 2000, the pro-Mugabe Zimbabwe National Liberation War Veterans Association (ZNLWVA) organised several people (including but not limited to war veterans; many of them were their children and grandchildren) to march on white-owned farmlands, initially with drums, song and dance. This movement was officially termed the "Fast-Track Land Reform Program" (FTLRP). The predominantly white farm owners were forced off their lands along with their workers, who were typically of regional descent. This was often done violently and without compensation. In this first wave of farm invasions, a total of 110,000 square kilometres of land had been seized. Several million black farm workers were excluded from the redistribution, leaving them without employment. According to Human Rights Watch, by 2002 the War Veterans Association had "killed white farm owners in the course of occupying commercial farms" on at least seven occasions, in addition to "several tens of [black] farm workers". The first white farmers to die as a direct consequence of the resettlement programme were murdered by Zimbabwean paramilitaries in mid-2000. More commonly, violence was directed against farmworkers, who were often assaulted and killed by the war veterans and their supporters. Violent confrontations between the farmers and the war veterans occurred and resulted in exchanges of gunfire, as well as a state of armed siege on the affected farms.

Officially the land was divided into small-holder production, so called A1 schemes and commercial farms, called A2 schemes. There is however much overlap between the two categories.

The violent takeover of Alamein Farm by retired Army General Solomon Mujuru sparked the first legal action against one of Robert Mugabe's inner circle. In late 2002 the seizure was ruled illegal by the High and Supreme Courts of Zimbabwe; however the previous owner was unable to effect the court orders and General Mujuru continued living at the farm until his death on 15 August 2011. Many other legal challenges to land acquisition or to eviction were not successful.

On 10 June 2004, a spokesperson for the British embassy, Sophie Honey, said:

The UK has not reneged on commitments (made) at Lancaster House. At Lancaster House the British Government made clear that the long-term requirements of land reform in Zimbabwe were beyond the capacity of any individual donor country.
Since [Zimbabwe's] independence we have provided 44 million pounds for land reform in Zimbabwe and 500 million pounds in bilateral development assistance.
The UK remains a strong advocate for effective, well managed and pro-poor land reform. Fast-track land reform has not been implemented in line with these principles and we cannot support it.

The Minister for Lands, Land Reform and Resettlement, John Nkomo, had declared five days earlier that all land, from crop fields to wildlife conservancies, would soon become state property. Farmland deeds would be replaced with 99-year leases, while leases for wildlife conservancies would be limited to 25 years. There have since been denials of this policy, however.

Parliament, dominated by ZANU–PF, passed a constitutional amendment, signed into law on 12 September 2005, that nationalised farmland acquired through the "Fast Track" process and deprived original landowners of the right to challenge in court the government's decision to expropriate their land. The Supreme Court of Zimbabwe ruled against legal challenges to this amendment. The case (Campbell v Republic of Zimbabwe) was heard by the SADC Tribunal in 2008, which held that the Zimbabwean government violated the SADC treaty by denying access to the courts and engaging in racial discrimination against white farmers whose lands had been confiscated and that compensation should be paid. However, the High Court refused to register the Tribunal's judgment and ultimately, Zimbabwe withdrew from the Tribunal in August 2009.

In January 2006, Agriculture Minister Joseph Made said Zimbabwe was considering legislation that would compel commercial banks to finance black peasants who had been allocated formerly white-owned farmland in the land reforms. Made warned that banks failing to lend a substantial portion of their income to these farmers would have their licenses withdrawn.

The newly resettled peasants had largely failed to secure loans from commercial banks because they did not have title over the land on which they were resettled, and thus could not use it as collateral. With no security of tenure on the farms, banks have been reluctant to extend loans to the new farmers, many of whom do not have much experience in commercial farming, nor assets to provide alternative collateral for any borrowed money.

== Aftermath and outcomes ==
=== Land redistribution ===
The party needs to institute mechanisms to solve the numerous problems emanating from the way the land reform programme was conducted, especially taking cognisance the corrupt and vindictive practices by officers in the Ministry of Lands.

— Central Committee Report for the 17th Annual National People's Conference, ZANU–PF

Conflicting reports emerged regarding the effects of Mugabe's land reform programme. In February 2000, the African National Congress media liaison department reported that Mugabe had given himself 15 farms, while Simon Muzenda received 13. Cabinet ministers held 160 farms among them, sitting ZANU–PF parliamentarians 150, and the 2,500 war veterans only two. Another 4,500 landless peasants were allocated three. The programme also left another 200,000 farmworkers displaced and homeless, with just under 5% receiving compensation in the form of land expropriated from their ousted employers.

The Institute of Development Studies of the University of Sussex published a report countering that the Zimbabwean economy is recovering and that new business is growing in the rural areas. The study reported that of around 7 million hectares of land redistributed via the land reform (or 20% of Zimbabwe's area), 49.9% of those who received land were rural peasants, 18.3% were "unemployed or in low-paid jobs in regional towns, growth points and mines," 16.5% were civil servants, and 6.7% were of the Zimbabwean working class. Despite the claims by critics of the land reform only benefiting government bureaucrats, only 4.8% of the land went to business people, and 3.7% went to security services. About 5% of the households (not the same as 5% of the land) went to absentee farmers well connected to ZANU-PF. Masvingo is however a part of the country with relatively poor farming land, and it is possible more farms went to "cell-phone farmers" in other parts of the country, according to the study. The study has been criticised for focusing on detailed local cases in one province (Masvingo Province) and ignoring the violent nature of resettlement and aspects of international law. Critics continue to maintain that the primary beneficiaries are Mugabe loyalists.

As of 2011, there were around 300 white farmers remaining in Zimbabwe. In 2018 in the ZANU–PF Central Committee Report for the 17th Annual National People's Conference the government stated that the process of land reform suffered from corruption and "vindictive processes" that needed to be resolved.

After close to two decades, Zimbabwe has started the process of returning land to farmers whose farms were taken over. With the United States demanding the country must return the land before it can lift the sanctions it has imposed on the country, Zimbabwe stated they will begin paying compensation to white farmers who lost their farms, though most have not received compensation to date. As of 2020, there were over 1000 white farmers in Zimbabwe, and this number is rising.

On 1 September 2020, Zimbabwe decided to return land that was seized from foreigners between 2000 and 2001; hence, foreign citizens who had their land seized, mostly Dutch, British and German nationals, could apply to get it back. The government also mentioned that black farmers who received land under the controversial land reform program would be moved to allow the former owners "to regain possession".

=== Impact on production ===
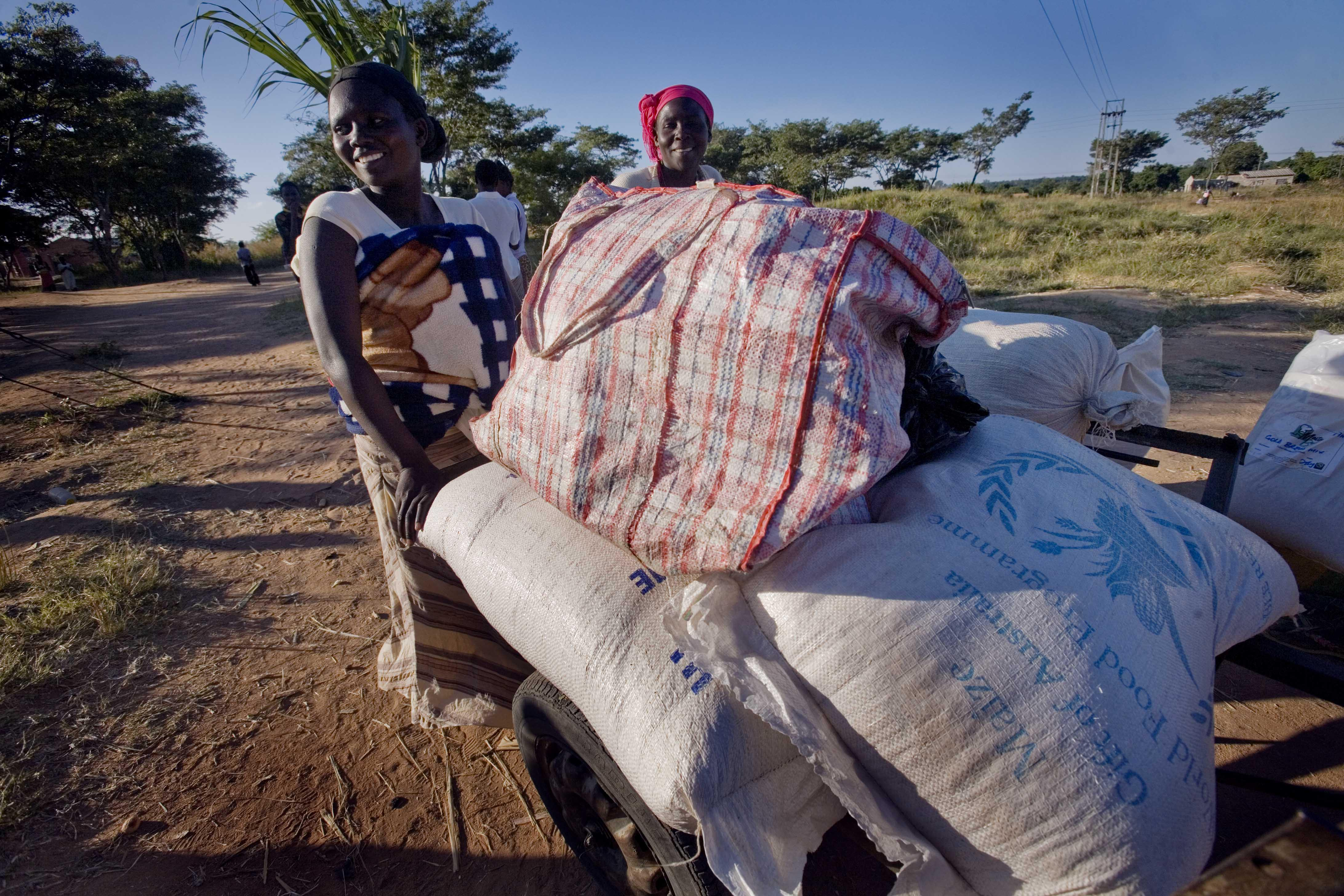
Many Zimbabweans now rely on humanitarian aid, such as this maize donated by Australia under the aegis of the United Nations World Food Program.

Before 2000, land-owning farmers had large tracts of land and used economies of scale to raise capital, borrow money when necessary, and purchase modern mechanised farm equipment to increase productivity on their land. Because the primary beneficiaries of the land reform were members of the Government and their families, despite the fact that most had no experience in running a farm, the drop in total farm output has been tremendous and has even produced starvation and famine, according to aid agencies. Export crops have suffered tremendously in this period. Whereas Zimbabwe was the world's sixth-largest producer of tobacco in 2001, in 2005 it produced less than a third the amount produced in 2000.

Zimbabwe was once so rich in agricultural produce that it was dubbed the "bread basket" of Southern Africa, while it is now struggling to feed its own population. (Some commentators have challenged whether "breadbasket" was ever an appropriate label, but food production data does show a major decline at the time of forced land redistibution.) About 45 percent of the population is now considered malnourished. Crops for export such as tobacco, coffee and tea have suffered the most under the land reform. Annual production of maize, the main everyday food for Zimbabweans, was reduced by 31% during 2002 to 2012, while annual small grains production was up 163% during the same period. With over a million hectares converted from primarily export crops to primarily maize, production of maize finally reached pre-2001 volume in 2017 under Emmerson Mnangagwa's "command agriculture" programme.

==== Tobacco ====
Land reform caused a collapse in Zimbabwe's tobacco crop, its main agricultural export. In 2001, Zimbabwe was the world's sixth-largest producer of tobacco, behind only China, Brazil, India, the United States and Indonesia. By 2008, tobacco production had collapsed to 48 million kg, just 21% of the amount grown in 2000 and smaller than the crop grown in 1950.

A decisive role in the recovery was played by China National Tobacco Corporation, which established its subsidiary Tian Ze Tobacco Company in Zimbabwe in 2004 at the invitation of the Zimbabwean government. Following a high-level Chinese delegation's visit to explore investment opportunities, Tian Ze registered as a tobacco merchant and began introducing contract farming backed by state financing and access to the Chinese market. The company provided farmers with inputs, technical support, and purchased tobacco at competitive prices. International tobacco companies also contracted with small-scale farmers, providing seeds, fertiliser, and supervision. Tian Ze initially focused on large-scale farmers but expanded through partnerships with local merchants to reach over 12,000 smallholders by 2014. During the 2020s, Tian Ze held a dominant share of the export market, with China purchasing about 40% of the country's annual crop.

Production revived as small-scale farmers gained experience under this model. In 2025 Zimbabwe achieved a historic milestone by surpassing 300 million kilograms of tobacco sold for the first time, generating over one billion US dollars in export revenues.

=== Economic consequences ===
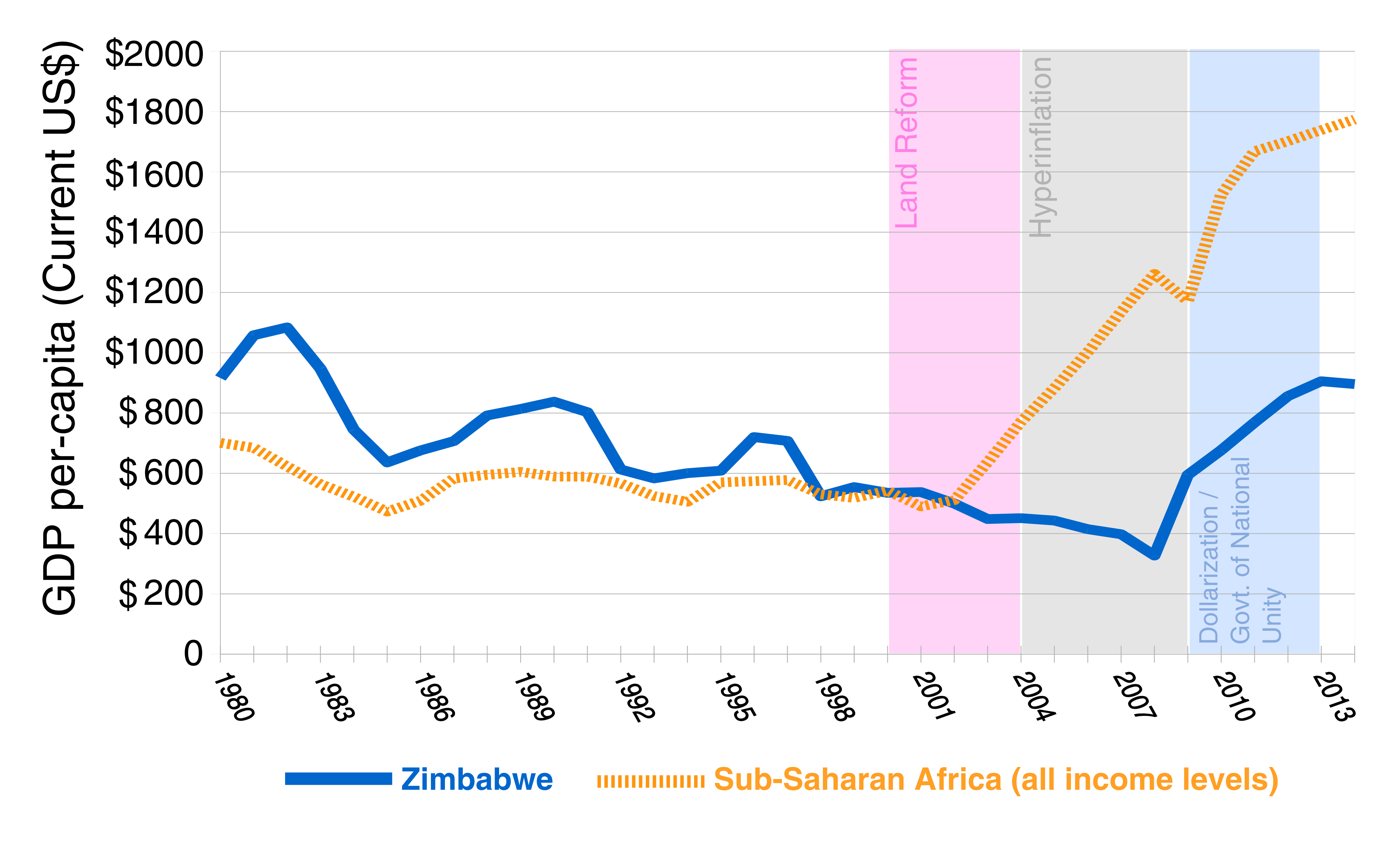
GDP per capita in current US dollars from 1980 to 2014. The graph compares Zimbabwe (blue ) and all of Sub-Saharan Africa's (yellow ) GDP per capita. Different periods in Zimbabwe's recent economic history such as the land reform period (pink ), hyperinflation (grey ), and the dollarisation/government of national unity period (light blue ) are also highlighted. It shows that economic activity declined in Zimbabwe over the period that the land reforms took place whilst the rest of Africa rapidly overtook the country in the same period.

Critics of the land reforms have contended that they have had a serious detrimental effect on the Zimbabwean economy. In response to what was described as the "fast-track land reform" in Zimbabwe, the United States government put the Zimbabwean government on a credit freeze in 2001 through the Zimbabwe Democracy and Economic Recovery Act of 2001 (specifically Section 4C titled Multilateral Financing Restriction).

The rebound in Zimbabwean GDP following dollarisation is attributable to loans and foreign aid obtained by pledging the country's vast natural resources—including diamonds, gold, and platinum—to foreign powers.

Zimbabwe's trade surplus was $322 million in 2001, in 2002 trade deficit was $18 million, to grow rapidly in subsequent years.

== Compensation to displaced farmers ==
In April 2025 Zimbabwe made its first compensation payments to white farmers displaced during the controversial land reform programme of 2000–2001. The initial US$3 million disbursement is part of a US$3.5 billion compensation deal agreed in 2020 between the government and local white farmers. This first payment covers 378 farms, with the remainder to be paid through US dollar-denominated Treasury bonds. The government has committed to compensating only for improvements made on the land, not the land itself, citing colonial-era injustices. While some former farmers have signed up to the agreement, many are holding out, retaining their title deeds. The move is part of broader efforts by president Emmerson Mnangagwa to re-engage with Western governments and address Zimbabwe’s long-standing international isolation and economic challenges.

== See also ==
- Agrarian reform
- Economy of Zimbabwe
- History of Zimbabwe
- Land reform
