= Mike Campbell (Pvt) Ltd v Zimbabwe =

Court case involving Zimbabwean farmers

Mike Campbell (Pvt) Ltd and Others v Republic of Zimbabwe
- Court: SADC Tribunal
- Full case name: Mike Campbell (Pvt) Ltd and 78 Others versus the Republic of Zimbabwe
- Decided: 28 November 2008
- Citation: [2008] SADCT 2

Court membership
- Judges sitting: Ariranga Pillay (President), Isaac Mtambo, Luis Mondlane, Rigoberto Kambovo, Onkemetse Tshosa

Case opinions
- (1) By unanimity: the Tribunal has jurisdiction to hear the case. (2) By unanimity: the Applicants have been denied access to the courts in Zimbabwe. (3) By a majority of four to one: the Applicants have been discriminated against on the ground of race. (4) By unanimity: fair compensation is payable to the Applicants for their lands compulsorily acquired by the government of Zimbabwe.

Mike Campbell (Pvt) Ltd et al. v. Republic of Zimbabwe is a case decided by the Southern African Development Community (SADC) Tribunal (hereinafter "the Tribunal"). The Tribunal held that the Zimbabwean government violated the organisation's treaty by denying access to the courts and engaging in racial discrimination against white farmers whose lands had been confiscated under the land reform program in Zimbabwe.

== Background ==
Land reform in Zimbabwe began after the signing of the Lancaster House Agreement in 1979 in an effort to more equitably distribute land between the historically disenfranchised blacks and the minority whites. Government-orchestrated land invasions began in February 2000. The Zimbabwean government formally announced a "fast track" resettlement program in July 2000, stating that it would acquire more than 3,000 farms for redistribution.

During the early 1970s Campbell, a South African Army captain, had been involved in the Rhodesian Bush War that pitted Rhodesia's mostly white government—50 of the 66 parliamentary seats were reserved for whites—against black nationalist guerrillas. He moved to Mount Carmel farm in 1974. He added a neighbouring plot of land in 1980, following Zimbabwean independence. As well as farming, Campbell set up an extensive nature reserve on the property, replete with giraffes, impala and other indigenous animals. He also created the Biri River Safari Lodge, which became a popular tourist attraction.

Campbell purchased Mount Carmel from himself after independence. (The full title was vested in 1999, when the Zimbabwean government declared no interest in the land.) In July 2001, amid large-scale land invasions by "war veterans", Campbell received a government notice to acquire Mount Carmel in the district of Chegutu, but the notice was declared invalid by the High Court. In July 2004, a new notice of intent to acquire Mount Carmel was published in the official Government Gazette, but no acquisition notice was actually issued. However, two months later, according to court filings, "persons purported to occupy the farm on behalf of ZANU–PF spokesman Nathan Shamuyarira, claiming the former minister had been allocated the farm." After three more preliminary notices to take the farm were published in 2004, Campbell applied to the High Court for a protection order.

Amendment 17 was added to Zimbabwe's constitution on 14 September 2005 to vest ownership of certain categories of land on the Zimbabwean government and to eliminate the courts' jurisdiction to hear any challenge to the land acquisitions. Campbell initiated proceedings in court on 15 May 2006, challenging the validity of Amendment 17. In December 2006 the Gazetted Land (Consequential Provisions) Act passed into law, requiring all farmers whose land was compulsorily acquired by the government and who were not in possession of an official offer letter, permit, or lease, to cease to occupy, hold, or use that land within 45 days and to vacate their homes within 90 days. On 11 October 2007, before the Supreme Court of Zimbabwe had delivered its judgment in the case, Campbell filed an application with the SADC Tribunal challenging the acquisition by the Zimbabwean government. Subsequently, 77 other persons joined as parties in the proceedings against the government of Zimbabwe.

Mike Campbell, his wife Angela, and their son-in-law Ben Freeth were kidnapped, taken to an indoctrination camp and beaten by thugs on 29 June 2008. Campbell died on 6 April 2011; his family stated he died from complications of the 2008 beating.

== Decision by the Supreme Court of Zimbabwe ==
The Supreme Court of Zimbabwe issued a decision in the case on 22 January 2008, dismissing Campbell's challenge. The Court held that: (1) race was not an issue in the case, because neither the relevant provisions of Section 16B of the Constitution nor the land acquisitions made reference to race or color; (2) the Government of Zimbabwe has an inherent right to compulsorily acquire property, and (3) the legislature has full power to change the Constitution. The Court also stated that an "application to a court of law to challenge a lawful acquisition would in effect be an abuse of the right to protection of law."

== The SADC Tribunal ==
The Tribunal was established by the SADC treaty. The SADC has been in existence since 1980, when it was formed as a loose alliance of nine majority-ruled States in Southern Africa known as the Southern African Development Coordination Conference (SADCC), with the main aim of co-ordinating development projects to lessen economic dependence on the then apartheid South Africa. The Tribunal ensures adherence to, and the proper interpretation of, the provisions of the Treaty and the subsidiary instruments made under it, and adjudicates upon disputes referred to it.

=== Decisions by the SADC Tribunal ===
The Tribunal concluded that it had jurisdiction to hear the case because the dispute concerned "human rights, democracy and the rule of law", which are binding principles for members of the SADC.

17 December 2007
The Tribunal granted an interim measure ordering the government of Zimbabwe to take no steps, directly or indirectly, to evict Campbell from the farm or interfere with his use of the land.
28 November 2008
The Tribunal's decision on this date addressed four main issues: (1) Whether the Tribunal had jurisdiction to hear the case; (2) whether the plaintiffs had been denied access to domestic courts in violation of the SADC Treaty; (3) whether the Zimbabwean government had discriminated against the plaintiffs on the basis of race, and (4) whether the plaintiffs were entitled to compensation. (1) The Tribunal held that it had jurisdiction to hear the case, because Amendment 17 had eliminated the plaintiffs' access to the domestic courts, and the plaintiffs were therefore entitled to seek remedy before the Tribunal. (2) The Tribunal found that the plaintiffs had been deprived of their right to a fair hearing before being deprived of their rights. (3) On the racial discrimination issue, the Tribunal held that the actions of the Zimbabwean government constituted indirect or "de facto" discrimination because implementation of Amendment 17 affected white farmers only. (4) Finally, the Tribunal held that the plaintiffs were entitled to compensation for the expropriation of their lands.
5 June 2009
After Campbell and another applicant, Richard Thomas Etheredge, filed a new application to declare the Government of Zimbabwe in contempt, the Tribunal held that the Government of Zimbabwe had failed to comply with the Tribunal's previous decision. The Tribunal stated that it would report its finding to the Summit of the SADC.

== Post-decision developments ==
Non-enforcement of the Tribunal's judgment
Mike Campbell applied to register the Tribunal's judgment of 28 November 2008 in the High Court on 23 December 2008, but the application was not accepted with no reasons given. Over a hundred prosecutions of white farmers continue because they remain on their lands. The High Court issued orders in April 2009 to evict the invaders on Mount Carmel, but nothing was done by the police to enforce the orders. No mention of the Tribunal's decision was made at the SADC's summit in early September 2009.

Threats, intimidation and fires
After February 2009, Campbell and Freeth's families received threats from invaders. Campbell and his wife were eventually forced from their home and Mount Carmel was invaded. Ben Freeth's and Mike Campbell's homesteads were destroyed in fires on 30 August 2009 and 2 September 2009, respectively.

Zimbabwe denies the legitimacy of the Tribunal
Zimbabwe's Justice Minister Patrick Chinamasa wrote to the Tribunal to inform of Zimbabwe's withdrawal from the Tribunal in a letter written on 7 August 2009, arguing that it did not have jurisdiction over Zimbabwe because the Tribunal's Protocol has not yet been ratified by two-thirds of the total members of the SADC, as required by the organisation's treaty, and stated that Zimbabwe would no longer be bound by any of the Tribunal's past or future judgments.

Decision by the High Court not to register the SADC Tribunal's judgement in Zimbabwe
Judge Patel of the High Court issued a decision on 26 January 2010 in which he held that the SADC Tribunal was properly constituted and had jurisdiction to hear Campbell's case, but its decision could not be registered for purposes of enforcement. Judge Patel's decision relied on two main reasons. First, the Supreme Court of Zimbabwe had confirmed the constitutionality of the land reform program, and registering the SADC Tribunal's judgment in Zimbabwe would challenge the Supreme Court's decision and undermine its authority; this would be contrary to public policy. Second, if the Zimbabwean government complied with the SADC Tribunal's decision, it would contravene section 16B of the Constitution (introduced by Amendment 17 in 2005, see above); this could not be allowed because the Constitution is the supreme law of Zimbabwe.

The SADC Summit orders a review of the role, functions and terms of the SADC Tribunal
On 17 August 2010 the Summit of the SADC heads of state and government decided "that a review of the role functions and terms [sic] of reference of the SADC Tribunal should be undertaken and concluded within 6 months." According to an opinion submitted by a group of legal and human rights organisations, the SADC Summit effectively suspended the Tribunal, as it failed to renew the tenure of five judges and failed to appoint new ones, leaving the Tribunal improperly constituted in violation of the Tribunal's Protocol; this decision may have been precipitated by Zimbabwe's challenge to the legality of the Tribunal after the Tribunal decided against Zimbabwe in cases concerning land disputes.

In a draft report commissioned by the SADC and dated 14 February 2011, WTI Advisors (an affiliate of the World Trade Institute) recommended, among other things, the following: SADC Member States should ensure that they give the force of law to SADC law by amending national law; Member States should consider amending the SADC Treaty to state that SADC law is supreme over national law, including constitutional law; the Tribunal should be given power to determine its own Rules of Procedure; the Tribunal's Protocol should be amended to provide that membership and rights of Member States may be suspended, with the Summit taking account of the possible consequences of suspension; the Tribunal should be able to order remedies (including fines) for non-compliance.

Legal action against heads of State
In April 2011 Mike Campbell, his company Mike Campbell (Pvt) Ltd, and another farmer, Luke Tembani, applied to the courts for an order against the 'Summit of the Heads of State or Government of SADC' and the presidents of 15 member countries, the Council of Ministers of SADC, and the Republic of Zimbabwe, demanding that the [SADC] Tribunal continues to function in all respects as established by Article 16 of the Treaty.

Compensation battle in South Africa
On 6 June 2011, the North Gauteng High Court in Pretoria, South Africa cleared the way for seized Zimbabwean government assets in Cape Town to be sold by auction to compensate three Zimbabwean farmers, including the late Mike Campbell. It is thought to be the first ruling in international legal history that a country's assets should be sold to provide compensation for human rights violations. The Zimbabwean government appealed the High Court's decision, but both the Supreme Court (in September 2012) and the Constitutional Court of South Africa (in June 2013) dismissed the appeal.

SADC Tribunal suspended
On 20 May 2011, an Extraordinary Summit of Heads of State and Government of SADC, held in Namibia, decided not to reappoint or replace SADC Tribunal members, effectively suspending the tribunal.

=== Mike Campbell's death ===
Mike Campbell died on 6 April 2011, aged 78. His family stated his death was due to the consequences of having been tortured.

== See also ==
- Mugabe and the White African, a documentary film on Mike Campbell
