= Zimbabwe African National Liberation Army =

African nationalist group, 1965–1980

- Flag of ZANU
- Dates active: 1965–1980
- Country: Rhodesia; Zimbabwe-Rhodesia; Zimbabwe
- Allegiance: ZANU
- Ideology: African nationalism African socialism Pan-Africanism
- Political position: Far-left
- Status: Dissolved
- Size: 25,500 (1979)

Zimbabwe African National Liberation Army (ZANLA) was the military wing of the Zimbabwe African National Union (ZANU), a militant African nationalist organisation that participated in the Rhodesian Bush War against white minority rule of Rhodesia (present-day Zimbabwe).

== Operations ==
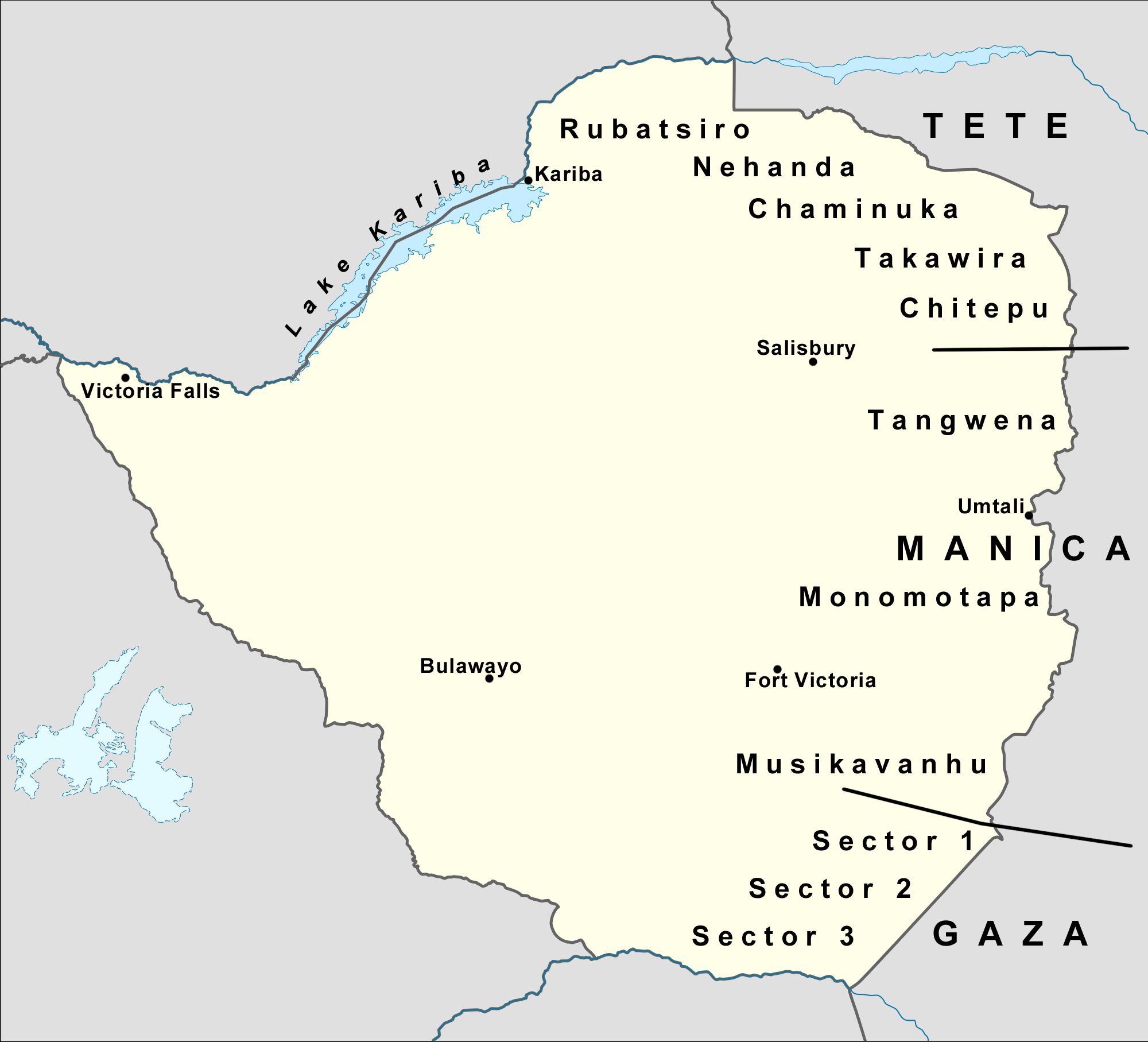
Map showing the provinces and sectors of ZANLA during the Bush War.

ZANLA was formed in 1965 in Tanzania, although until the early 1970s ZANLA was based in camps around Lusaka, Zambia. Until 1972 ZANLA was led by the nationalist leader Herbert Chitepo. He was followed by Josiah Tongogara from 1973 until his death in 1979; by then ZANLA had an estimated 25,500 combatants. With the war drawing to a close, commands fell to Robert Mugabe, previously ZANU's number two leader after Tongogara and head of the movement's political wing.

Until about 1971, ZANLA's strategy was based on direct confrontation with the Rhodesian Security Forces. From 1972 onwards, ZANLA adopted the Maoist guerrilla tactics that had been used with success by the Mozambique Liberation Front (FRELIMO): infiltrating combatants into the country, politicising the peasantry and participating in 'hit-and-run' ambush operations. ZANLA was supported by China, which supplied arms and provided advisors to train the cadres. As Mugabe had described himself in an interview as a "Marxist–Leninist-Mao Zedong Thought" supporter, which enraged the Kremlin, Soviet support went exclusively to the rival Zimbabwe People's Revolutionary Army (ZIPRA).

The ZANU was organised along Maoist lines, being conceived as a vanguard party that would guide the masses towards the revolution, and the party did not tolerate any sort of critical thinking or dissent within its ranks. The South African historian Sabelo Ndlovu-Gatsheni noted that far from being the conforming to the popular stereotype of "freedom-fighters", the ZANLA was a rigidly hierarchical organisation whose cadres were expected to unconditionally obey orders, and which regularly conducted purges to liquidate any cadres who differed even in the slightest from the party line. The party's principal spokesman Edson Zvobgo wrote that the "ZANU Idea" was the "gun idea", namely that violence was the best solution to any problem, and that the ZANU cadres should embrace the "gun idea" of ruthlessly seeking to gun down all enemies of the party. The ZANLA gloried the gun as a symbol of power and of "cleaning up the rot" as the purges to liquidate cadres who showed insufficient willingness to embrace the party line wholeheartedly were known. The ZANU leadership ruled via fear, and Ndlovu-Gatsheni described "violent disciplinary measures" and the execution of those cadres who differed from the party line as routine and normal.

ZANLA's close association with the FRELIMO helped it after Mozambican independence in 1975. From about 1972, ZANLA had operated from Tete Province in northern Portuguese Mozambique, which was FRELIMO-controlled, and, after Mozambican independence, ZANLA was permitted to open additional training and supply camps along the Rhodesian-Mozambican border. This greatly assisted the recruitment and training of cadres.

=== Nhari mutiny and aftermath ===
In 1974, the ZANLA was shaken by the so-called "Nhari mutiny" when Thomas Nhari and several cadres objected to the party's tactics; Nhari and the rest were convicted by a kangaroo court of mutiny and executed, despite the "court" ruling that they should only be demoted. After the "Nhari mutiny", the ZANU become consumed with an "obsession" to purge its ranks of "sell-outs and counter-revolutionaries", and executions of ZANLA members by their colleagues become the norm. At its camps for training cadres in Mozambique and Zambia, all new ZANLA cadres were publicly beaten by their officers until they lose control of their bowels to determine if they were "sell-outs" to the revolution and huge pit structures called chikaribotso were dug for holding prisoners as many of the cadres did not pass the test to see if they were loyal to the revolution. For the party, Gukurahundi, a Shona word which literally means "the early rain which washes away the chaff before the spring rains", which is perhaps best translated as "total annihilation", was its ideal for conducting politics. Many of the idealistic Shona young men and women who joined the ZANLA to fight against the minority government of Rhodesia were greatly disillusioned once they reached the training camps in Mozambique and Zambia, discovering that the ZANLA were far from being the romantic freedom-fighters that they had imagined.

=== Rivalry with ZIPRA ===
Beside their overall political ideologies, the main differences between the Zimbabwe People's Revolutionary Army (ZIPRA), the armed wing of the pro-Soviet Zimbabwe African People's Union (ZAPU), and ZANLA were that:

- ZANLA drew its recruits mostly from Shona-speaking ethnic groups.
- ZANLA followed a strategy of politicisation of the peasant population (inspired by the Maoist teachings of "people's war").
- After about 1972, ZANLA introduced combatants into the country for long-term campaigns of guerrilla fighting, while ZIPRA was designed to be used as a conventional armed force: entering the country, striking and pulling back to its bases in Zambia and Angola.

During the late 1970s, the predominantly Shona tribe ZANLA fighters were deployed in the Matabeleland and Midlands provinces, areas where the predominantly Ndebele ZIPRA mostly operated. There were a lot of clashes between the two forces. ZANLA fighters were well known for their savagery when it came to dealing with Ndebele civilians who were usually taken into what were called overnight bases and forced to sing songs in Shona denouncing ZAPU and its leader Joshua Nkomo. These ZANLA cadres had a love for chicken and a local staple food known as Sadza. Each time they came to a Ndebele homestead, given their lack of the Ndebele language, they would simply demand in Shona: "ndipe sadza nehuku" (Give me sadza with chicken) hence the local Ndebele derogatory nickname for them "oSadza nehuku". They were known as well for saying "Down with Nkomo" most of the time, hence another Matebele name for them became "opasi".

=== 1980 election and aftermath ===
Following the 1980 general election large portions of ZANLA were integrated into the new Zimbabwe National Army. Those who served as the ZANLA elite in exile became the new elite in Zimbabwe, enjoying far greater benefits and perks than did those who had actually fought the Rhodesian Army in the field during the 1970s.

In June 1980, after the independence of Zimbabwe, a team of Nigerian soldiers came to convey former pro-independence guerrilla fighters to Nigeria for recruitment in the Nigerian Defence Academy. A Nigerian soldier, Colonel Musa Bityong, left behind in the guerrilla camps was able to recruit 100 former ZANLA/ZIPRA guerrillas, and again returned in December to recruit 50 more.
