= Orders, decorations, and medals of Rhodesia =

The Rhodesian honours system was established at the time that Rhodesia unilaterally declared itself a republic in March 1970, when a system of military and civil decorations and awards was instituted by Presidential Warrant in November 1970.

Prior to 2 March 1970, Rhodesians were conferred awards in the British honours system.

== List of honours ==
The list of Rhodesian honours and decorations, in order of precedence, is as follows:

Caption
| Name | Postnominal | Civilian Ribbon | Military / Police Ribbon | Service |
|---|---|---|---|---|
| Grand Cross of Valour | GCV | - | Grand Cross of Valour (Rhodesia) GCV | ALL |
| Conspicuous Gallantry Decoration | CGD | - | Conspicuous Gallantry Decoration CGD | Civilian |
| Grand Commander of the Legion of Merit | GCLM | Legion of Merit GCLM | None Awarded | Both |
| Grand Officer of the Legion of Merit | GLM | Legion of Merit GLM | Legion of Merit GLM | Both |
| Independence Decoration | ID | Independence Decoration ID | - | Civilian |
| Independence Commemorative Decoration | ICD | Independence Commemorative Decoration ICD | - | Civilian |
| Commander of the Legion of Merit | CLM | Legion of Merit CLM | Legion of Merit CLM | Both |
| Police Cross for Conspicuous Gallantry | PCG | - | Police Cross for Conspicuous Gallantry PCG | Police |
| Silver Cross of Rhodesia | SCR | - | Silver Cross of Rhodesia SCR | Military |
| Prison Cross for Gallantry | RPC | - | Prison Cross for Gallantry RPC | Military |
| Officer of the Legion of Merit | OLM | Legion of Merit OLM | Legion of Merit OLM | Both |
| Member of the Legion of Merit | MLM | Legion of Merit MLM | Legion of Merit MLM | Both |
| Police Decoration for Gallantry | PDG | - | Police Decoration for Gallantry PDG | Police |
| Bronze Cross of Rhodesia (Army) | BCR | - | Bronze Cross of Rhodesia BCR | Military |
| Bronze Cross of Rhodesia (Airforce) | BCR | - | Bronze Cross of Rhodesia BCR | Military |
| Bronze Cross of Rhodesia (Guards) | BCR | - | Bronze Cross of Rhodesia BCR | Military |
| Police Cross for Distinguished Service | PCD | - | Police Cross for Distinguished Service PCD | Police |
| Defence Cross for Distinguished Service | DCD | - | Defence Cross for Distinguished Service DCD | Military |
| Rhodesia Prison Cross for Distinguished Service | PSC | - | Prison Cross for Distinguished Service PSC | Prison |
| Meritorious Conduct Medal | MCM | - | Meritorious Conduct Medal MCM | Military |
| Rhodesia Prison Medal for Gallantry | RPM | - | Prison Medal for Gallantry RPM | Prison |
| Medal for Meritorious Service | MSM | Medal for Meritorious Service MSM | Medal for Meritorious Service MSM | Both |
| Police Medal for Meritorious Service | PMM | - | Police Medal for Meritorious Service PMM | Police |
| Defence Forces' Medal for Meritorious Service | DMM | - | Defence Forces' Medal for Meritorious Service DMM | Military |
| Rhodesia Prison Medal for Meritorious Service | PMS | - | Prison Medal for Meritorious Service PMS | Prison |
| President's Medal for Chiefs | - | President's Medal for Chiefs ' | - | Chiefs |
| President's Medal for Headmen | - | President's Medal for Headmen ' | - | Chiefs |
| Military Forces' Commendation | - | - | Military Forces' Commendation RMFC | Military |
| Director’s Commendation (Prisons) | - | - | Director’s Commendation (Prisons) ' | Prison |
| Police Long Service Medal (Rhodesia) | - | - | Police Long Service Medal ' | Police |
| Exemplary Service Medal | ESM | - | Exemplary Service Medal ESM | ALL |
| Prison Long Service Medal (Rhodesia) | - | - | Prison Long Service Medal ' | Prison |
| Police Reserve Long Service Medal (Rhodesia) | - | - | Police Reserve Long Service Medal XX | |
| Medal for Territorial or Reserve Service | - | - | Medal for Territorial or Reserve Service ' | Military |
| Fire Brigade Long Service and Good Conduct Medal (Rhodesia) | - | - | Fire Brigade Long Service and Good Conduct Medal ' | Fire Brigade |
| Rhodesia Badge of Honour | - | Rhodesia Badge of Honour ' | Rhodesia Badge of Honour ' | ALL |
| President’s Medal for Shooting | Pres MS | - | President’s Medal for Shooting (Rhodesia) Pres MS | ALL |
| General Service Medal | - | - | General Service Medal ' | Police |
| General Service Medal | - | - | General Service Medal ' | Military |
| Prison General Service Medal | - | - | Prison General Service Medal ' | Prison |
| Rhodesian District Service Medal | - | (Note: Department of Internal Affairs (INTAF)) | - | INTAF |

== Details and recipients ==
Around 12,000 awards were given out between 1970 and 1981. The last Rhodesian gallantry awards were awarded in June 1980, three months after Zimbabwe's independence. However, Rhodesian long-service decorations continued to be given to police officers and service personnel until June 1982.

The most highly decorated soldier in the Rhodesian Army was Major Grahame Wilson, second-in-command of the Rhodesian SAS, who was awarded the Grand Cross of Valour, Silver Cross of Rhodesia and Bronze Cross of Rhodesia.

== See also ==
- Orders, decorations, and medals of Zimbabwe
