= List of post-nominal letters (Rhodesia) =

Post-nominal letters in the Rhodesian honours system include the following. The Rhodesian honours system was superseded by the Zimbabwe honours system in 1980.

Office	Post-nominal	Ribbon
Orders and Decorations
Grand Cross of Valour	GCV	Grand Cross of Valour (Rhodesia) GCV
Conspicuous Gallantry Decoration	CGD	Conspicuous Gallantry Decoration CGD
Rhodesian Legion of Merit
Grand Commander	GCLM	Legion of Merit GCLM
Grand Officer	GLM	Legion of Merit GLM
Commander	CLM	Legion of Merit CLM
Officer	OLM	Legion of Merit OLM
Member	MLM	Legion of Merit MLM
Other Medals
Independence Decoration	ID	Independence Decoration ID
Independence Commemorative Decoration	ICD	Independence Commemorative Decoration ICD
Police Cross for Conspicuous Gallantry	PCG	Police Cross for Conspicuous Gallantry PCG
Silver Cross of Rhodesia	SCR	Silver Cross of Rhodesia SCR
Prison Cross for Gallantry	RPC	Prison Cross for Gallantry RPC
Bronze Cross of Rhodesia	BCR	Bronze Cross of Rhodesia BCR

== See also ==
- Lists of post-nominal letters
