= Medal for Meritorious Service =

- Type: Medal
- Awarded for: resource and devotion to duty or exemplary voluntary service to the community.
- Country: Republic of Rhodesia (1970–79); Zimbabwe Rhodesia
- Presented by: President of Rhodesia
- Eligibility: Military and civilians
- Post-nominals: MSM
- Status: Discontinued in 1980 (Note: All Rhodesian medals were officially discontinued with the change in government. Some were continued under different names.)
- Established: November 1970
- First award: 1970

Highlights
- Total: 608
- Ribbon bar of the Civilian Division Ribbon bar of the Military Division

Order of Wear
- Next (higher): Prison Medal for Gallantry
- Equivalent: Police Medal for Meritorious Service; Defence Forces' Medal for Meritorious Service; Prison Medal for Meritorious Service
- Next (lower): President's Medal for Chiefs

The Medal for Meritorious Service was a medal awarded by the Republic of Rhodesia to civilians and military personnel.

== History ==
The Medal for Meritorious Service was awarded to civilians (who were usually government workers such as INTAF) for "resource and devotion to duty or exemplary voluntary service to the community.", and awarded to military members (used only for territorial, volunteer and reserve forces) for "resource and devotion to duty."

== Description ==
The medal was a silver circular medal that was 36mm around, with the obverse of the medal had the national coat of arms, and the reverse had the pick from the coat of arms in the centre encircled by the words "For Meritorious Service". The recipient's name would be etched on the rim, and a silver bar would be awarded for a subsequent award. The medal also had two different divisions, a civilian division that would have just a plain orange ribbon, and a military division that would have multi-coloured stripes in the centre.

== See also ==
- Orders, decorations, and medals of Rhodesia
- Meritorious Conduct Medal
