= Robert C. MacKenzie =

American professional soldier and mercenary

Robert Callen MacKenzie SCR BCR
- Squadron Commander Capt. Robert C. MacKenzie receives the Silver Cross of Rhodesia in 1979, "for conspicuous gallantry and leadership in action."
- Born: 30 November 1948; San Diego, California
- Died: 24 February 1995 (aged 46); Sierra Leone
- Military career
- Allegiance: United States; Rhodesia; South Africa; Transkei
- Branch: United States Army; Rhodesian Army; South African Army; Transkei Defence Force (Croatian Republic of Herzeg-Bosnia) Croatian Defence Council
- Service years: 1966–1967; 1970–1980; 1980–1981; 1981–1985; 1995
- Rank: Private First Class (US Army); Captain (Rhodesian Army); Major (South African Army)
- Commands: C Squadron 22 (Rhodesian) SAS; Sierra Leone Commando Unit
- Wars: Vietnam War; Rhodesian Bush War; South African Border War; Bosnian War; Sierra Leone Civil War †
- Awards: Silver Cross of Rhodesia SCR Bronze Cross of Rhodesia BCR Purple Heart Army Good Conduct Medal National Defense Service Medal Vietnam Service Medal Vietnam Campaign Medal

Robert Callen MacKenzie SCR BCR (November 30, 1948 – February 24, 1995) was an American professional soldier whose career included service as an infantryman in the United States Army during the Vietnam War, the C Squadron 22 (Rhodesian) SAS, the South African Defence Force, and the Transkei Defence Force.

As a contributing editor for unconventional operations for Soldier of Fortune (SOF) magazine, he was sent to cover conflicts in different hot-spots around the globe, including Mozambique, Central America, Croatia, Bosnia, Russia, Thailand, Suriname, Taiwan and Cambodia. At the time of his death, he was in command of and training the Sierra Leone Commando Unit (SLCU).

== US Army service ==
After finishing high school at the age of 17 in 1966, MacKenzie was awarded an appointment to the United States Air Force Academy. He, however, opted to join the Army, not wishing to miss out on the Vietnam War. At the Army Recruiting Station in San Diego, California, he enlisted as an infantryman. By 1967, he was airborne-qualified, had completed the Jungle warfare course in Panama and was sent to Vietnam. On 29 May 1967, a bullet wound he suffered while storming Mother's Day Hill ended his army service. After a year in the hospital, the US Army declared him 70% disabled and he was permanently retired. His last duty assignment was with Co B 1st Bn(ABN) 327th Infantry, 101st ABN Div.

== Rhodesian SAS service ==
In 1970, MacKenzie traveled to Rhodesia in Africa, and passing the rigorous selection course, enlisted as a foreign volunteer in the Rhodesian Special Air Service, where from then on until 1980, he rose through the ranks from Trooper to Captain and SAS Squadron Commander.

Decorations received during this time served with the Rhodesian SAS include the Bronze Cross of Rhodesia for "gallantry and determination in action" and the Silver Cross of Rhodesia for "conspicuous gallantry and leadership in action."

== SADF/Transkei Service ==
When the Rhodesian Bush War ended with the Lancaster House Agreement, MacKenzie resigned from the new Zimbabwe National Army and joined the South African Defence Force as a Special Forces Major. The following year, he joined the Transkei Defence Force as second-in-command, Transkei Special Forces Regiment. In March 1983, Lesotho security officials accused Mackenzie of training Lesotho Liberation Army members and leading a unit in an unsuccessful attack on a PMU base near Ongeluksnek. In 1985, after 15 years serving abroad, he returned to the United States.

== Soldier of Fortune ==
SOF's Robert K. Brown employed MacKenzie as contributing editor for unconventional operations, and MacKenzie continued his unconventional career. In Mozambique, he worked with RENAMO, securing the release of seven Western hostages. He also trained and fought in Central America, Croatia and Bosnia. In February 1995, at the behest of Sierra Leone's leader, Valentine Strasser, MacKenzie took command of a training troop, the Sierra Leone Commando Unit (SLCU) in cooperation with Strasser's right-hand man, Major Abu Tarawali and sixty Gurkhas of the Gurkha Security Guards. Their opposition in that African country was the Revolutionary United Front (RUF), an insurgent army then plaguing rural Sierra Leone.

== Final tour of duty ==
MacKenzie arrived in Sierra Leone in the end of January 1995. The country's leader, Valentine Strasser had begun to organize a force to counterattacks by the RUF rebels and his right-hand man, Major Tarawali had contracted sixty Gurkhas of the GSG (Gurkha Security Guards Limited) to train approximately 160 green troopers that would form the nucleus of the SLCU. MacKenzie's first order of business was to locate an appropriate camp on which to base the troops. On a scouting patrol to assess possible locations for the training camp, MacKenzie, Tarawali and an escort of would-be SLCU came upon a village that had been burned by the rebels. McKenzie and the co-director of GSG, Borlace, wanted to pursue the rebels; however, the inexperienced troops were reluctant to do so. MacKenzie, Borlace and Tarawali went ahead on their own, and their soldiers later followed. Surprised by such determined action, the RUF forces broke and ran. This incident infused the SLCU with new confidence.

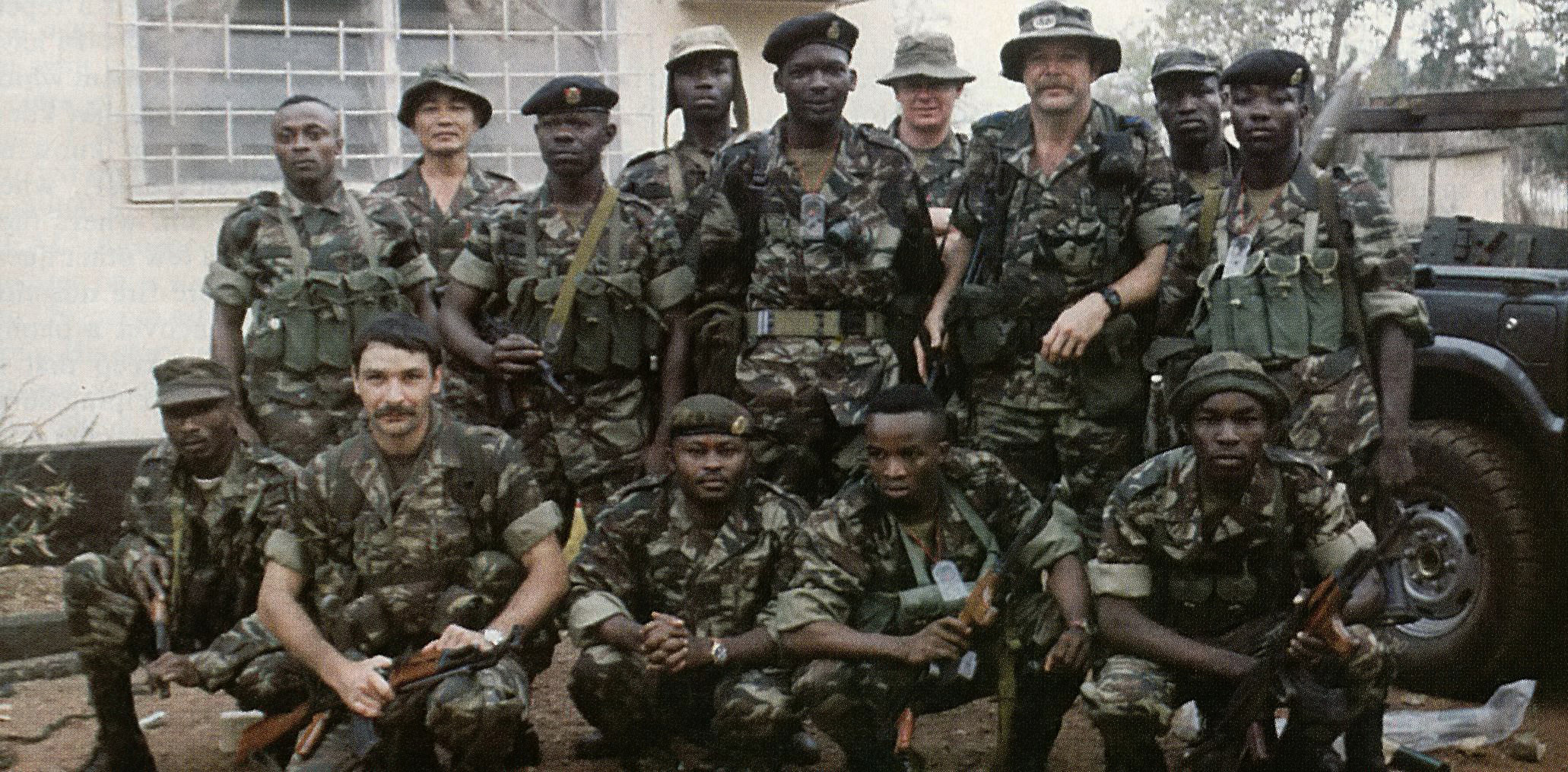
Robert C. MacKenzie (standing, wings on hat) with some of the Sierra Leone Commando Unit he was training with the Gurkha Security Guards. Andy Myers is second from left, kneeling.

On February 17, MacKenzie led a convoy of vehicles from their base camp 91 miles from Freetown, the capital, to Mile 47, a town which had a government garrison. This stretch of road had to be secured if they had to hold onto their training camp (Camp Charlie) deep within bandit country. On this particular mission, they were ambushed by an RUF contingent. Marshaling the Gurkhas and the SLCU troops, MacKenzie drove through the kill zone and began flanking maneuvers, surprising the enemy at the aggressiveness of their response. The rebels turned and broke contact. Thick undergrowth prevented effective tracking, but three blood spoors were found, indicating that the RUF forces had taken some casualties.

These successes in the field, however, deluded the government hierarchy into believing that the RUF would crumble in the face of any organized resistance. They ordered MacKenzie to attack the RUF base camp in the Malal Hills. MacKenzie countered that the SLCU had not been trained yet and that it would not be ready for such a major engagement. Back came the word that MacKenzie should take the Gurkhas on the mission, and leave the green SLCU troopers to be trained later. MacKenzie again countered that legally this would not be possible, since the GSG were contracted for training alone and not for combat. Finally, the army chief of staff personally wrote MacKenzie, ordering the attack for February 22 or 23. Determined to do his duty, MacKenzie agreed to investigate the possibility of attacking the Malal Hills.

== Awards ==
- Silver Cross of Rhodesia (SCR) (Rhodesia)
- Bronze Cross of Rhodesia (Army) (BCR) (Rhodesia)
- Purple Heart (USA)
- Army Good Conduct Medal (USA)
- National Defense Service Medal (USA)
- Vietnam Service Medal (USA)
- Vietnam Campaign Medal (Note: Vietnamese: Chiến Dịch Bội Tinh - Republic of Vietnam Campaign Medal) (South Vietnam)

== Death ==
MacKenzie gathered any intelligence he could in the face of the government's impatience. In preparation for the assault on the hills, jets borrowed from the Nigerians were to drop cluster bombs on the rebel positions in order to soften them up. However, the Russian pilot flying a Mi-24 helicopter tasked with bringing in the Nigerian commander who would communicate with the jets, without any explanation simply hovered over the camp on the 23rd and left. Calls to HQ fell on deaf ears, and when the Nigerian jets arrived the next day, they bombed the wrong hill. Alerted by ordnance falling on unoccupied terrain, the rebels were ready for MacKenzie's group when they approached their objective.

MacKenzie, leading from up front with Tarawali and Lieutenant Andy Myers, came under fire from a bandit ambush. Tarawali was killed in the first volley, and an attempt to carry his body back was made. Fire was heavy, coming from the enemy hidden deep in the undergrowth. The SLCU dropped Tarawali's body and ran, actually trampling the Gurkha medics who were a little behind the command group. MacKenzie ordered that everyone should retreat and the senior Gurkha medic saw MacKenzie take two rounds through his legs and one through his back. MacKenzie dropped his rifle as Lieutenant Myers bent over him to give him assistance. This was the last anyone saw of either. Intercepts of bandit radio revealed that they had taken Tarawali's and MacKenzie's bodies, but there was no word on Myers. He was presumed dead at 9:00 on February 24, 1995.

It is alleged that the RUF warrior bandits consumed Mackenzie's corpse in order to gain his strength.

== Family ==
MacKenzie was survived by his wife, Sybil, and a son, Ian. He was the son-in-law of Ray S. Cline, deputy director for Intelligence for the Central Intelligence Agency in 1962. MacKenzie's wife Sybil was previously married to Stefan Halper of Contragate notoriety.

Bob MacKenzie - (was) an outstanding soldier - a man I was very proud to be associated with as a soldier and as a friend. America can be justly proud of Bob's achievements: We Rhodesians most certainly are.

— Lt. Col. Ron Reid-Daly, CLM DMM MBE, commanding officer, Selous Scouts Regiment, Rhodesian Army

== Publications ==
- "Shoot and Scoot". Soldier of Fortune. Vol. 18, no. 10. October 1993. pp. 48–51.
- "4th Estate Armored Brigade, with Chuck Fremont". Soldier of Fortune. Vol. 18, no. 10. October 1993. pp. 52–53.

== See also ==
- Blood diamonds
- C (Rhodesia) Squadron 22 SAS
- Executive Outcomes
- Rhodesian Bush War
- Robert K. Brown
- Selous Scouts
- Sierra Leone Civil War
- Soldier of Fortune
