= List of post-nominal letters (Zimbabwe) =

Post-nominal letters in Zimbabwe include:

| Office | Post-nominal |
Orders and Decorations
| Gold Cross of Zimbabwe | GCZ |
Zimbabwe Order of Merit
| Grand Commander | GCZM |
| Grand Officer | GZM |
| Commander | CZM |
| Officer | OZM |
| Member | MZM |
Other Decorations
| Liberation Decoration | LD |
| Silver Cross of Zimbabwe | SCZ |
| Bronze Cross of Zimbabwe | BCZ |
| Medal for Meritorious Service | MMS |

The Honours System of Zimbabwe superseded the Rhodesian Honours System in 1980.

== See also ==
- List of post-nominal letters (Rhodesia)
- Lists of post-nominal letters
