= Police Decoration for Gallantry =

Gallantry medal of Rhodesia

- Ribbon of the Police Decoration for Gallantry
- Type: Decoration
- Awarded for: Gallantry in the line of duty
- Country: Rhodesia
- Presented by: British South African Police
- Eligibility: Members of the British South Africa Police, Police Support Unit, and Police Reserve.
- Post-nominals: P.D.G.
- Status: No longer awarded
- Established: 1970
- First award: 1970
- Final award: 1979

Highlights
- Total recipients: 22

Precedence
- Next (higher): Police Cross for Conspicuous Gallantry
- Equivalent: Bronze Cross of Rhodesia
- Next (lower): Police Cross for Distinguished Service

The Police Decoration for Gallantry was a Rhodesian gallantry award. It was awarded for gallantry to members of the British South Africa Police, Police Support Unit, and Police Reserve.

== Institution ==
The award was instituted in 1970 by Presidential Warrant, the first award being made in October 1970. The last awards were made in October 1979. The award was the police equivalent of the Bronze Cross of Rhodesia and, because of the BSAP's seniority, ranked ahead it in the official order of precedence.

== Medal ==
The medal was a sterling silver circular medal bearing the arms of Rhodesia on the obverse and a truncheon on a laurel wreath on the reverse, suspended from a green ribbon with a central stripe of Oxford blue, edged with gold, and two narrow scarlet stripes . The medal was impressed in small capitals with the recipient's name on the rim, and was awarded with a case of issue, miniature medal for wear, and an illuminated certificate.

== Recipients ==
22 awards were made, one posthumously. Recipients were entitled to the post-nominal letters P.D.G.

== Zimbabwe ==
The Conspicuous Gallantry Decoration was superseded in October 1980 by the Bronze Cross of Zimbabwe, which is awarded for conspicuous bravery in perilous conditions, but which is open for award to civilians as well as military personnel.

== See also ==
- Orders, decorations, and medals of Rhodesia
