= Attack on Whistlefield Farm =

- Part of Rhodesian Bush War
- Type: Terrorist attack
- Target: Whistlefield Farm
- Date: 23 December 1972; 1:00am
- Executed by: ZANLA
- Outcome: Whistlefield Farm damaged
- Casualties: 1 killed 4 injured

Late on 22 December 1972, a troop from the Rhodesian Special Air Service, followed shortly by the Rhodesian Light Infantry, reported to the police station in Centenary. The land mine in Altena's driveway was discovered, disarmed and removed. For their own safety, Marc de Borchgrave and his family were sent to Whistlefield Farm, which was owned by Archie Dalgluish and his family, while their family home was being repaired.

Having been alerted to the de Borchgraves' new location through sympathetic farmworkers, guerrillas from the original cadre requested permission from ZANLA to carry out another attack. After ZANLA's area commanders in Centenary had been consulted, a raid on the second target (Whistlefield Farm) was planned.

== The Raid ==
At about one o'clock on the morning of 23 December, the insurgents reconnoitred Whistlefield Farm and shelled the structure with mortar fire. An RPG-7 was aimed into the bedroom in which de Borchgrave was sleeping. The rocket hit the window frame and lightly wounded the tobacco farmer, his nine-year-old daughter Anne, and de Borchgrave. The ZANLA cadres then retreated and hid themselves. News of the second attack reached Second Lieutenant Ian Buttenshaw and Sachse around midnight, and they deployed immediately, but having discovered a mine near Altena they disembarked from the vehicles 1 kilometre (0.62 mi) from Whistlefield and made the final approach on foot. Anne was evacuated by helicopter as the RLI and SAS secured the area for the night.

The next morning, on 24 December 1972, two tracking teams arrived at Whistlefield to assist Buttenshaw and Sachse in a 360-degree search: one was from the SAS and led by Ron Marillier, while the other was a British South Africa Police (BSAP) team including tracking dogs. The security forces searched for tracks while also investigating reported sightings. The tracks of the ZANLA fighters were discovered on 27 December on the western side of the farm and the trackers asked Buttenshaw and Sachse to bring the vehicles carrying the heavy equipment around to meet them. On the way the truck carrying Buttenshaw ran over a mine with one of its rear wheels, causing it to detonate. Buttenshaw himself, who was sitting on the bonnet of the vehicle, was thrown clear but Corporal Norman Moore and Trooper Pete Botha, sitting in the back, were not as fortunate, taking the brunt of the blast. Captain Gordon Holloway, behind the wheel, and Trooper Rod Boden in the passenger seat went into severe shock but were ultimately unharmed. Moore, on the other hand, died two days later from his wounds, while Botha survived but lost both legs.

In their haste, Nhongo's cadres had not attempted to conceal their tracks as they headed west, towards the Musengezi river—Buttenshaw's pursuant RLI men, therefore, realised how quickly the guerrillas were moving and sped up their chase. The Rhodesians stopped for the night in a rocky area near a stream, replenished their scanty water supply, and continued at dawn. About half an hour after setting off they crossed a vlei to discover a recently vacated guerrilla camp. "The fire was still burning and the food still warm," Buttenshaw writes. "From the abandoned kit a hurried departure appeared evident." Support was summoned from the SAS, who were tasked to set up stops along the Musengezi to the west. Buttenshaw's men reached the top of the Musengezi valley to see Rhodesian helicopters dropping the SAS soldiers at regular intervals along the river, as well as the ZANLA cadres, who were moving straight towards one of the SAS stops. The stop opened fire and killed some; the rest of the guerrillas scattered and ran. Buttenshaw's RLI men were then withdrawn from the follow-up for a day and a half and placed in stop positions. The chase was temporarily taken over by the SAS under Lieutenant Chris Schulenburg before Buttenshaw's men returned on 30 December 1972. Soon after setting out that morning, they discovered an unarmed, wounded ZANLA fighter who had been shot in the arm by the SAS in the initial contact two days earlier. He had hidden after being abandoned by his comrades, and since then had lost a great deal of blood.

For the first time the Rhodesian Security Forces were faced with a seemingly insoluble problem ... after carrying out their attacks the terrorists had not gone to ground in bush-camps in uninhabited areas where they could eventually be tracked down ... neither had they gone to ground in inhabited areas where information from the local population to the Police or Special Branch had indicated their whereabouts. This time there was nothing. No tracks ... no information.

— Lieutenant-Colonel Ron Reid-Daly, writing in 1982, explains the effect of ZANLA's subversion on rural Rhodesia

After two years of patient preparation, the farm attacks by ZANLA near Centenary marked the effective start of its "Second Chimurenga" (Note: The "First Chimurenga" in question is the Second Matabele War, a series of Ndebele and Shona insurgencies against the British South Africa Company administration in 1896–97.) against the Rhodesian government.

== Aftermath ==
The effectiveness of ZANLA's adopted Maoist tactics was demonstrated in particular by the element of surprise they were now able to use against the security forces, and by the ability they had achieved to melt seamlessly into the local population between strikes. The rural black people in the north-east of the country were now, almost totally subverted and intimidated" by ZANLA and provided the guerrillas with food, shelter and manpower. Rather than having the tribesmen actively volunteer information about insurgent movements and locations, as had happened during previous infiltrations, the Rhodesian Security Forces now met an increasingly silent and sometimes hostile welcome from the rural blacks. More farm attacks took place over the following weeks, during December 1972 and January 1973, leading the security forces to set up Operation Hurricane in northern Mashonaland. This counter-insurgency operation would continue right up to 1980. "It was the start of a whole new ball game," writes Lieutenant-Colonel R. E. H. Lockley. "The war proper had started."

Six huts and a mosque in the farmworkers' compound were torched during the skirmish, although accounts differ on who started the fire.
