= Beira fuel depot attack =

1979 terrorist attack in Mozambique

Coordinates: 19°48′14″S 34°50′38″E

Beira fuel depot attack Beira (Mozambique)
- Part of the Mozambican Civil War & Rhodesian Bush War
- Location: Beira, District of Munhava, Mozambique
- Date: March 23, 1979
- Target: Beira's Fuel Depot and Electrical Supply
- Attack type: RPG and Machine Gun Attack
- Deaths: 18 FPLM soldiers killed (RENAMO claim); 1 RENAMO member killed
- Perpetrators: Rhodesia; South Africa; RENAMO

The Beira fuel depot attack was a raid on the fuel depot in Beira's Munhava District on March 23, 1979, and was conducted by Rhodesian SAS forces who were assisted by South Africa's Four-Recce Commandos. The attack resulted in millions of dollars’ worth of damages to Beira's fuel tanks belonging to Mozambican and foreign companies as well as extra publicity for the RENAMO rebel group. Although RENAMO claimed responsibility and was credited for the attack by Rhodesia, the raid was an almost entirely Rhodesian and South African effort except for the presence of a single RENAMO representative on the mission.

== Attack ==
20 men from the A Squadron in the Rhodesian SAS under the leadership of Captain Bob McKenzie were chosen to partake in the attack. The team flew from Salisbury, Rhodesia, to the South African 4 Recces base in Cape Town to begin training before traveling to Durban, where they would take off for Beira in the SAS Frederick Creswell, a fast attack craft. The saboteurs entered Beira at roughly 11 pm and arrived at the fuel facilities undetected. The Rhodesians used bombs, RPGs and machine guns to destroy the fuel tanks with a huge inferno engulfing the facility. The city erupted into commotion as the squadron fled the scene with gunfights flaring and anti-aircraft guns firing into the air. The Squadron made it back to the craft unharmed except for the RENAMO representative Marco Cinco who died in a battle.

== Aftermath ==
A 6-man South African Firefighting team was sent to Beira to put out the fire which had raged for around 40 hours before being extinguished. However, the electricity supply to the city was restored only 4 hours after being cut. Estimates of the cost of the damage range from $3 million to $16 million with oil tanks owned by Mobil Oil, Shell, Caltex and Petrolmoc all damaged. The oil in the depot was meant to be sent to Malawi.

Captain Bob McKenzie was awarded the Silver Cross of Rhodesia for his participation in the attack which is Rhodesia's second highest military decoration.

=== Reactions ===
- Robert Mugabe: ZANU-PF leader Robert Mugabe condemned the attack claiming it was "aimed at destabilizing the People's Republic of Mozambique so that it would subsequently reduce its support for the liberation struggle of the Zimbabwe people"

== Bibliography ==
- Robinson, David A. (2006). Curse on the Land: A History of the Mozambican Civil War (PDF). Perth.Attack:
