= GCZ (disambiguation) =

Grasshopper Club Zurich is a multisports club based in Zurich, Switzerland.

GCZ may also refer to:

- Vehicle registration code for Człuchów County, a county in Pomeranian Voivodeship, Poland
- GCZ Stadium, multipurpose stadium in Larnaca, Cyprus
- Gold Cross of Zimbabwe, Zimbabwe's highest military decoration
