= President's Medal for Shooting (Rhodesia) =

Medal awarded to the Champion chost of the Rhodesian Security Forces

President’s Medal for Shooting
- Ribbon of the President’s Medal for Shooting
- Awarded for: the Champion shot of the Rhodesian Security Forces
- Country: Rhodesia
- Presented by: President of Rhodesia
- Post-nominals: Pres MS
- Clasps: A silver clasp was also awarded for subsequent awards

Highlights
- Total: 8 awarded

The President's Medal for Shooting was a medal awarded in the Republic of Rhodesia to the Champion shot of the Rhodesian Security Forces.

== History ==
A total of 8 medals were won by personnel of the Rhodesian Security Forces, including Inspector D. Toddun, Station Sergeant G. James, and Field Reservist W. Tarr who was awarded a bar for a subsequent award.

The official abbreviation of the medal was Pres MS, which was also its postnominal letters.

== Description ==
A silver, 36mm circular medal, the obverse of the medal depicts a kneeling pioneer rifleman, with the words "The President's Medal". The obverse of the medal depicts .303 and FN rifles crossed over each other and a pioneer-era bandolier, encircled with the words "Champion Shot in the Rhodesian Security Forces". The ribbon also is given a clasp denoting the year the medal was awarded. A silver clasp was also awarded for subsequent awards.

The ribbon consists of three equal vertical stripes of maroon, green, and blue .

== See also ==
- Orders, decorations, and medals of Rhodesia
- Orders, decorations, and medals of Zimbabwe
