= SCZ (disambiguation) =

SCZ most commonly refers to schizophrenia.

SCZ may also refer to:

- .SCZ, a SmartDraw file
- Luova Airport (Santa Cruz/Graciosa Bay/Luova Airport), Solomon Islands, IATA airport SCZ
- Santa Cruz (disambiguation), the name of several places, particularly:
  - Autódromo Internacional de Santa Cruz do Sul, a motor racing circuit in Brazil
  - Santa Cruz County, Arizona, United States
- Scorzalite, a phosphate mineral
- Sedgwick County Zoo in Wichita, Kansas, United States
- Shetland dialect, proposed ISO 939 language code scz
- Silver Cross of Zimbabwe, SCZ, post-nominal letters in Zimbabwe
- Slovak Cycling Federation
- Suichang County, an administrative division of Zhejiang, China
