= Operation Ignition =

- Part of Rhodesian Bush War
- Operation Ignition (Botswana)
Date	18 September 1976
Location	Francistown, Botswana
Result	Rhodesian victory

Belligerents
Rhodesia	ZIPRA; Soviet Union

Commanders and leaders
(Rhodesia) Lt. Col Ronald Reid-Daly (Rhodesia) Sandy Maclean	Joshua Nkomo

Units involved
Rhodesian Army: Selous Scouts	Unknown

Strength
9 scouts 2 vehicles	ZIPRA 30 guerilla infantrymen Soviet Union 5 advisors

Casualties and losses
None	ZIPRA 5 wounded Soviet Union 4 out of 5 advisors killed. One advisor wounded.

Operation Ignition was an operation undertaken by the Selous Scouts of the Rhodesian Army on 18 September 1976 against the forces of the guerrilla group ZIPRA Francistown.
