= BCZ =

BCZ or bcz may refer to:

- Berlin Control Zone, the airspace within a 20-mile radius of a pillar in the cellar of the Allied Control Authority Building
- Bronze Cross of Zimbabwe, a gallantry decoration
- Banyum language, a language spoken in Senegal and Guinea-Bissau, by ISO 639 code
- Brent Cross West railway station, a train station in London, England, by station code
- Icterid, a family of birds, by Catalogue of Life identifier
- Bickerton Island Airport, an airport on Bickerton Island off the coast of Northern Territory, Australia, by IATA code
