= Chris Schulenburg =

Rhodesian soldier decorated for Valour

Captain Chris Schulenburg GCV SCR
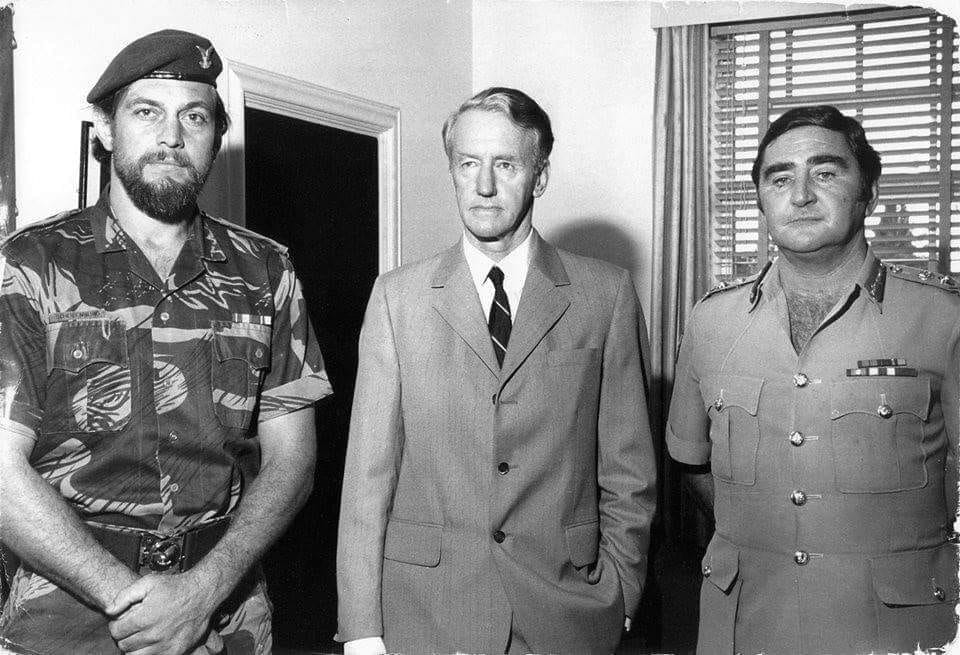
- Schulenburg (left) with prime minister Ian Smith and General John Hickman
- Born: Union of South Africa
- Military career
- Allegiance: Rhodesia
- Branch: Rhodesian Army
- Rank: Captain
- Nickname: Schulie
- Units: Selous Scouts; Rhodesian Special Air Service
- Conflicts: Rhodesian Bush War
- Awards: Grand Cross of Valour (Rhodesia) GCV Silver Cross of Rhodesia SCR

Captain Christofel Ferdinand Schulenburg GCV SCR is a South-African born former Rhodesian Army soldier. He is one of only two recipients of the Grand Cross of Valour, Rhodesia's highest military honour and also received the Silver Cross of Rhodesia. Schulenburg received the Grand Cross of Valour in 1978 for an action in which he penetrated an enemy position before returning to his unit and leading a successful assault.

== Early career ==
Schulenburg was known as Schulie. A South African by birth, he joined the Rhodesian Army and became a sergeant in the Rhodesian Light Infantry, who were then fighting in the Rhodesian Bush War against militant African guerilla organisations. Schulenburg went on to transfer to the Rhodesian Special Air Service fighting particularly in joint operations with the Portuguese who were then fighting against an independence movement in their colony of Mozambique.

In January 1973, ZANLA fighters attacked a group of white Rhodesian land inspectors near Mount Darwin, killing two and capturing a third, Gerald Hawkesworth, together with his black staff. The staff were released or escaped but Hawkesworth was taken into Mozambique. The Rhodesian government received permission from the Portuguese to follow the group and Rhodesian Army personnel saw them cross the Zambezi River. A parachute assault was launched to attempt to recover Hawkesworth. Lieutenant Schulenburg led one of two four-man pathfinder groups that were first to land. One man in his group, Sergeant Frank Wilmot, was killed when his parachute failed to open. The paratroopers killed a ZANLA member carrying a note requesting permission from FRELIMO, a Mozambican nationalist force, to transit the area with Hawkesworth but were unsuccessful in locating or rescuing him. Schulenburg received the Silver Cross of Rhodesia on 26 September 1975 for actions while serving with the SAS.

== Selous Scouts ==
After his contract with the Rhodesian Army expired Schulenburg returned to South Africa but soon returned to Rhodesia, seeking to rejoin the SAS, but they were unwilling to accept specific conditions he placed on his service: that he have a rolling one-month contract, held no responsibility for command and would instead operate as a one-man reconnaissance unit. During this period the Bush War intensified and the Rhodesian Army established the Selous Scouts as a less elitist special forces unit than the SAS. The Selous Scouts commander Ronald Reid-Daly was an old friend and was willing to accept the terms except the last. Because two men could evacuate a wounded third or, in extremis, kill him, Reid-Daly insisted that Schulenburg operate on this basis as a minimum. Schulenburg agreed to the terms and they were approved by Major-General John Hickman.

Schulenburg joined the Selous Scouts as a lieutenant and was soon advanced to captain. He was key in establishing a dedicated reconnaissance troop in the unit, deploying by HALO parachuting techniques. Schulenburg was also successful in amending his terms to permit two-man patrols.

The Selous Scouts often conducted clandestine operations within Rhodesia and abroad during the war. Schulenburg often participated in these operations, specialising in long-range reconnaissance missions in which he would be accompanied only by a single black scout. At least one of these missions took him deep into neighbouring Mozambique. On another occasion, as a lieutenant, commanding a remote post he established a small poultry farm to provide his men with fresh eggs. The poultry relocated frequently with the unit. In the aftermath of the successful Operation Eland Schulenburg participated in Operation Prawn against FRELIMO-controlled rail lines in Mozambique.

== Grand Cross of Valour ==
On 24 March 1978, Schulenburg received Rhodesia's highest award for gallantry, the Grand Cross of Valour. He was the first recipient of the award and one of only two recipients in its history (the other being SAS commander Grahame Wilson). Schulenburg received the award for actions whilst serving as a captain in the Selous Scouts. He conducted a number of reconnaissance operations on the north-east Rhodesian border. On one occasion, he penetrated an enemy position to count the number of defenders and note their weaponry. Upon returning to his unit, which was cut-off from support and outnumbered, he led a successful frontal assault on the position. Schulenburg's black soldiers wrote to Reid-Daly to express their admiration for Schulenburg, noting "no man who has done what he has done should still be alive". Schulenburg has been described by historians Paul Moorcraft and Peter McLaughlin as "the most distinguished, and decorated, Rhodesian soldier".

The Rhodesian Bush War ended in 1979 with the Lancaster House Agreement and subsequent transition to black-majority rule as Zimbabwe. Schulenburg returned to South Africa, and by 1983 was the Transvaal region liaison officer of the Selous Scouts Regimental Association.

=== Awards ===
- Grand Cross of Valour (Rhodesia) (GCV)
- Silver Cross of Rhodesia (SCR)
