= Grahame Wilson =

Rhodesian Army officer decorated for Valour

Major Grahame Wilson GCV SCR BCR
- Military career
- Allegiance: Rhodesia
- Branch: Rhodesian Army
- Rank: Major
- Nickname: The Phantom Major
- Service number: 780793
- Commands: Rhodesian Special Air Service (SAS)
- Conflicts: Rhodesian Bush War
- Awards: Grand Cross of Valour (Rhodesia) GCV Silver Cross of Rhodesia SCR Bronze Cross of Rhodesia BCR

Major Grahame Wilson GCV SCR BCR, also known as "The Phantom Major", is a retired Rhodesian Army officer who served as second-in-command of the Rhodesian Special Air Service (SAS). He is the most decorated member of the Rhodesian Army.

== Military career ==
Wilson served with the Rhodesian African Rifles (RAR) before passing selection for the Rhodesian Special Air Service (SAS) in July 1975. He commanded B Squadron from January 1976–February 1978 and was promoted to become second-in-command of the regiment from March 1978–May 1980. He took command in 1980. Wilson's first decoration for valour was the BCR which was awarded on 07 Oct 1977 while he was still a Captain. His second, the SCR, was awarded on 13 April 1979 with Major Wilson in the 2IC post. Following Rhodesia's reconstitution and recognised independence as Zimbabwe in 1980, Wilson was awarded the Grand Cross of Valour on 30 June 1980 while a Major and second-in-command. He was the second and final person to be awarded the honour after Chris Schulenburg, who received the award while serving with the Selous Scouts. Wilson was awarded Wings on Chest (WOC) on 18 April 1979.

During Rhodesia's transition to Zimbabwe, Wilson obtained the rank of major and retired after serving as Officer Commanding SAS from April 1980 to the unit's disbandment in December that year. He delivered the final regimental address at Kabrit Barracks on 13 December 1980, before the final lowering of the colours. An account of the role of the SAS in the Rhodesian Bush War was authored by Wilson and Greg Mills, entitled Who Dares Loses: Assessing Rhodesia's Counter-Insurgency Experience. Wilson was appointed as the President of the C-Squadron Rhodesian Special Air Service Association following the death of General Peter Walls.

=== Awards ===
- Grand Cross of Valour (Rhodesia) (GCV)
- Silver Cross of Rhodesia (SCR)
- Bronze Cross of Rhodesia (Army) (BCR)
- Wings on Chest

== Post-war ==
Residing in Johannesburg, South Africa, Wilson is currently involved in business and conservation initiatives where he consults to various organisations. He is actively involved in efforts to rewild rare and endangered species and engage with community owned conservation projects in order to liberate sustainability out of protected areas in Southern and West Africa.
