= Meritorious Conduct Medal =

Rhodesian military decoration

- Ribbon of the medal
- Type: Medal
- Awarded for: Brave and gallant conduct over and above the call of duty in a non-combatant capacity.
- Description: Bronze medal bearing a portrait of Cecil Rhodes.
- Eligibility: Members of the Rhodesian police, security forces and civilians.
- Post-nominals: M.C.M.
- Campaign: Rhodesian Bush War.
- Clasps: Bronze clasp awarded for second award. No clasp ever awarded.
- Status: Abolished in 1981.
- Established: 1970
- First award: 1970
- Final award: 1979

Highlights
- Total: 93
- Total awarded posthumously: 13
- Total recipients: 92 + City of Umtali (now Mutare)

Precedence
- Next (higher): Bronze Cross of Rhodesia
- Next (lower): Rhodesia Prison Medal for Gallantry

The Meritorious Conduct Medal was a Rhodesian military decoration for brave and gallant conduct.

== Institution ==
The award was instituted in 1970 by Presidential Warrant, the first awards being made the same year. The last awards were made in December 1979.

== Medal ==
The medal was a medal whose obverse was identical to the relief portrait of Cecil Rhodes on the Rhodesian General Service Medal but struck in bronze rather than cupro-nickel, with a blank reverse. The ribbon was purple. The medal was impressed in small capitals with the recipient's name on the rim, and was awarded with a case of issue and miniature medal for wear.

== Recipients ==
A total of 93 awards of the Meritorious Conduct Medal were made, thirteen posthumously. Notable recipients included

- The city of Umtali (now Mutare).
- The crew members of Air Rhodesia Flight 825.
- A police officer and three NCOs from the Rhodesian SAS killed when the explosive device they were transporting blew up prematurely.
- John M Harvey British South Africa Police

Recipients are entitled to the post-nominal letters M.C.M.

== Zimbabwe ==
The Meritorious Conduct Medal was abolished in September 1981. Its status as the most junior of the Republic of Zimbabwe's awards for gallantry was taken by the Bronze Cross of Zimbabwe, which is also awarded to civilians and members of the Zimbabwean armed forces and police officers, and has an identical plain purple ribbon.
