= Njini Ntuta =

Zimbabwean politician

Njini Ntuta (10 September 1924 – 25 November 1984) was a Zimbabwe African People's Union (ZAPU) politician. He was deputy minister of mines in the first post-independence government but was sacked by President Robert Mugabe in a 1982 purge of ZAPU politicians. Ntuta was assassinated by members of the security forces acting on the orders of Colonel Flint Magama in 1984. At the time Mugabe's government blamed the murder on anti-government dissidents.

== Biography ==
Ntuta was born on 10 September 1924 to Gwaula Ntuta and Minah Ntuta (née Ndebele) in the Tsholotsho Communal lands, Southern Rhodesia. He was brought up in the Anglican faith. Ntuta was a member of the Zimbabwe African People's Union (ZAPU) and was appointed deputy minister of mines in Robert Mugabe's Zimbabwe African National Union-led government, the first black-majority government following the end of the Rhodesian Bush War and the Lancaster House Agreement.

Ntuta was sacked by Mugabe on 17 April 1982 in a purge of ZAPU politicians from his government. He became a senior opposition figure in the National Assembly of Zimbabwe. Ntuta was murdered by automatic gunfire in fields near his home at Nyamandhlovu in Matabeleland on 25 November 1984. He was chased by three gunmen for 2.5 miles (4.0 km) before he was killed. At the time of his killing the diplomatic corps in Harare and ZAPU officials questioned the official Zimbabwean government account that placed responsibility for the killings with anti-government dissidents. Ntuta had himself questioned similar claims for the deaths of other civilians in the preceding months, alleging that the Zimbabwe National Army (ZNA) had perpetrated the killings. It later emerged that he was killed by security operatives masquerading as dissidents. The ZNA's Colonel Flint Magama had been in charge of the killing.

Ntuta is recognised as a national hero of Zimbabwe. He is buried in Pelandaba Cemetery in Bulawayo. In 2013 his grave was reported to have been vandalised, with his headstone being removed.
