= Cultural Beira =

- Full name: Cultural Beira
- Ground: Culturenga; Beira, Mozambique
- Capacity: 6,000
- League: Moçambola 3
- 2006: 6

Cultural Beira, usually known simply as Cultural, is a traditional association football club based in Beira, Mozambique. They played in the Moçambola, the highest level of football in Mozambique in 1980, finishing 7th out of 8 in the southern group.
