= Grand Cross of Valour =

Military decoration of Rhodesia

- Type: Military decoration
- Awarded for: Conspicuous Valour
- Country: Rhodesia
- Post-nominals: GCV
- Established: 1970
- First award: 1978
- Final award: 1980

Highlights
- Total: Two
- Total recipients: CF Schulenburg; GA Wilson

Precedence
- Next (lower): Conspicuous Gallantry Decoration

The Grand Cross of Valour was Rhodesia's highest military decoration, awarded for conspicuous valour by members of the Security Forces in combat.

It was the equivalent of the Victoria Cross, which it replaced, and was formerly conferred on Rhodesian soldiers prior to 1965.

== Institution ==
The award was instituted in 1970 by Presidential Warrant, the first being made in 1978. The second and final investiture was in June 1980.

== Medal ==
The medal was a 9 ct gold cross with an enamelled roundel in the centre bearing a lion's head, hung from a V-shaped suspender from a scarlet ribbon woven with a central green stripe edged in white, with a gold stripe between the red and white. The medal was impressed in small capitals with the recipient's name on the reverse, and was awarded with a case of issue, miniature medal for wear, and an illuminated certificate.

== Recipients ==
Just two awards of the Grand Cross of Valour were made. The first recipient was Acting Captain Chris F. Schulenberg GCV SCR of the Selous Scouts. Following the country's recognised independence as Zimbabwe in 1980, the Grand Cross of Valour was awarded to Major Grahame Wilson GCV SCR BCR, second-in-command of the Rhodesian SAS, and Rhodesia's most highly decorated soldier. Recipients were entitled to the post-nominal letters G.C.V.

== Zimbabwe ==
The Grand Cross of Valour was superseded in October 1980 by the Gold Cross of Zimbabwe, which is presented for conspicuous bravery in perilous conditions, but which can be awarded to civilians as well as military personnel.

== See also ==
"Orders, Medals and Decorations of Zimbabwe".
