= Flint Magama =

Colonel Flint Magama (died 27 January 1986) was a Zimbabwean Army officer. A political commissar for the Zimbabwe African National Union, he joined the Military Intelligence Directorate after Zimbabwean independence. Magama was involved in killings and torture during the Gukurahundi genocide and, in 1984, was responsible for the assassination of Zimbabwe African People's Union politician Njini Ntuta. In 1986 Magama was appointed commander of the Zimbabwe National Army's intervention in the Mozambican Civil War. He was killed when a helicopter he was a passenger in crashed due to engine failure during the recapture of Marromeu. Magama was posthumously awarded the country's highest military decoration for bravery, the Gold Cross of Zimbabwe.

== Biography ==
Magama was born as Derek Flint Mavima. His father was Zimbabwe African National Union (ZANU) member David Zirirai Mavima and his brother is Larry Mavima, a member of the Senate of Zimbabwe and Minister of State for Provincial Affairs and Devolution for Midlands.

Magama was a ZANU political commissar. In the first years of black-majority rule, following the end of the Rhodesian Bush War and the Lancaster House Accords Magama was a member of the Military Intelligence Directorate, based in Bulawayo. He became involved in killings and torture during the Gukurahundi genocide against Zimbabwe African People's Union (ZAPU) supporters and anti-government dissidents, often being present during questioning sessions.

Magama later became deputy commander of the Zimbabwe National Army's (ZNA) 1 Brigade. While in this role he was responsible for the 25 November 1984 killing of ZAPU politician Njini Ntuta who had accused the regime of involvement in the genocide.

In January 1986 Magama took over command of the ZNA troops fighting in support of FRELIMO in the Mozambican Civil War; though he had little military experience he was politically well connected. The ZNA intervention had initially been successful but the troops and their FRELIMO allies began to suffer renewed attacks from RENAMO. In early July the city of Marromeu was captured by RENAMO after the 300-man garrison was routed. Magama drew up a plan for an air assault to recapture the city's airfield for use as a bridgehead in an attack on the city. The assault, named Operation Octopus, began on 24 January.

On 27 January Magama was killed in a helicopter crash as Zimbabwean troops assaulted the city. Also killed in the crash were two privates, the two pilots, a second lieutenant and a major (who was second in command of the Parachute Squadron). The cause of the loss was determined to be engine failure though RENAMO claimed to have shot the aircraft down. Marromeu was successfully recaptured during the ensuing ZNA assault.

Magama was buried at the National Heroes' Acre in Harare. On 21 June 1991 he was awarded Zimbabwe's highest military decoration for bravery, the Gold Cross of Zimbabwe. The Flint Magama barracks in Rusape are named after him.
