= Beira, Mozambique =

Beira
- City
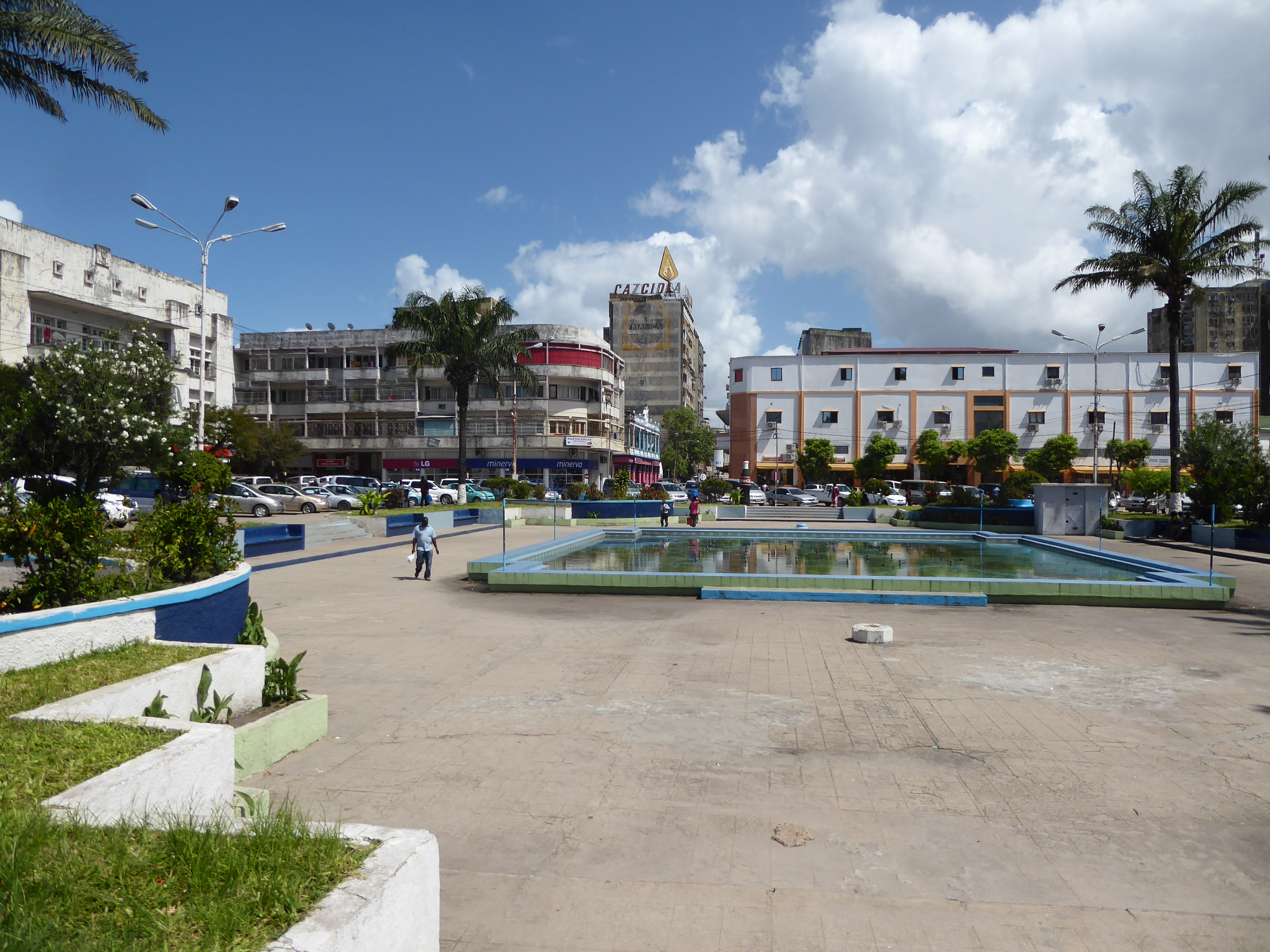
- Municipal square in Beira

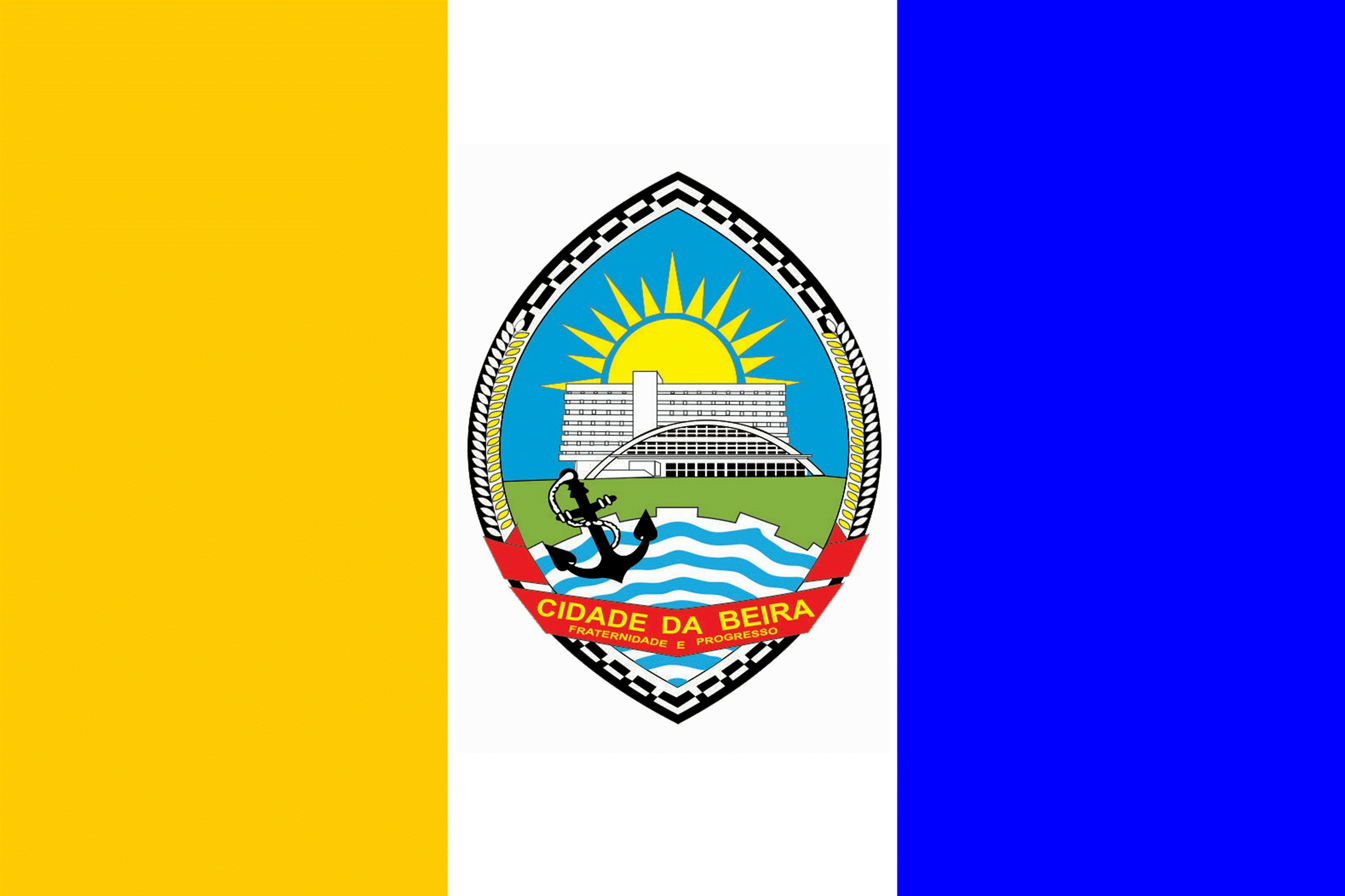
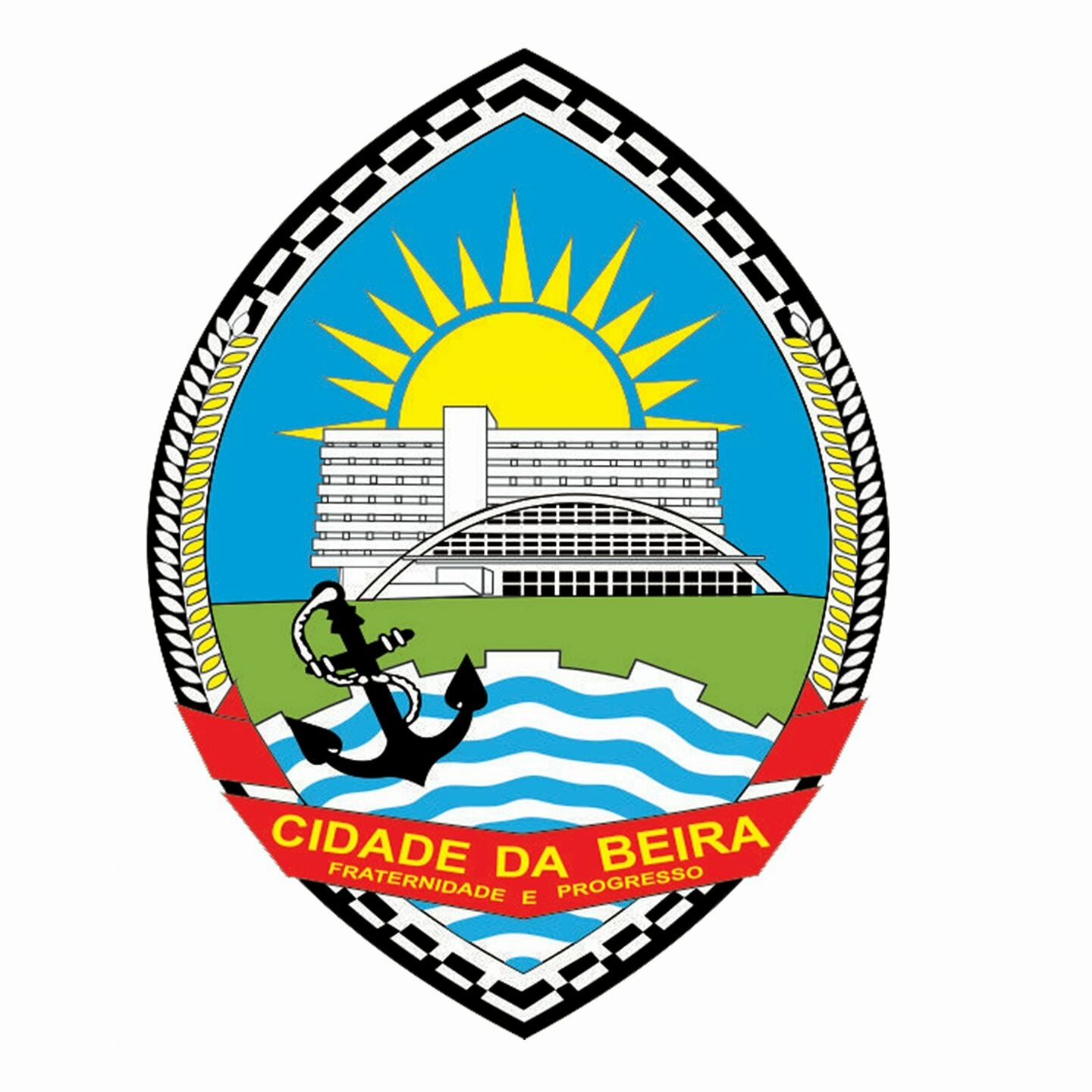
- Flag Seal

- Location within Mozambique Location within Africa
- Coordinates: 19°50′S 34°51′E
- Country: Mozambique
- Province: Sofala
- Founded: 1887
- City Status: 1907
- Named for: Prince of Beira

Government
  - Mayor: Albano Carige

Area
  - City: 633 km^{2} (244 sq mi)
- Elevation: 14 m (46 ft)

Population (2017 census)
  - City: 592,090
  - Rank: 4th
  - Density: 935/km^{2} (2,420/sq mi)
  - Urban: 687,764
  - Metro: 787,007
- Area code: +258
- Climate: Aw

Beira (Portuguese pronunciation: [ˈbejɾɐ]) is the capital and largest city of Sofala Province, in the central region of Mozambique.

Beira is where the Pungwe River meets the Indian Ocean. It is the fourth-largest city by population in Mozambique, after Maputo, Matola and Nampula. Beira had a population of 397,368 in 1997, which grew to 530,604 in 2019. A coastal city, it holds the regionally significant Port of Beira, which acts as a gateway for both the central interior portion of the country as well as the land-locked nations of Zimbabwe, Zambia and Malawi.

Originally called Chiveve after a local river, it was renamed Beira to honour the Portuguese Crown prince Dom Luís Filipe (titled Prince of Beira, itself referring to the traditional Portuguese province of Beira), who had visited Mozambique in the early 20th century. It was first developed by the Portuguese Mozambique Company in the 19th century, supplanting Sofala as the country's main port. It was then directly developed by the Portuguese colonial government from 1947 until Mozambique gained its independence from Portugal in 1975. Beira is the second largest seaport for international cargo transportation to Mozambique after Maputo. In March 2019, the city was heavily damaged by Cyclone Idai, destroying up to 90% of the city.

== Geography ==
Beira is located on the Mozambique Channel, an arm of the Indian Ocean located between Madagascar and Mozambique. The city sits north of the mouth of the convergence of two major rivers of Mozambique: the Buzi River and the Pungwe River. The Buzi crosses 250 kilometres (160 mi) across Manica and Sofala provinces to form a wide estuary. The Pungwe crosses 400 kilometres (250 mi) from the Eastern Highlands of Zimbabwe also through Manica and Sofala provinces to Beira.

== History ==
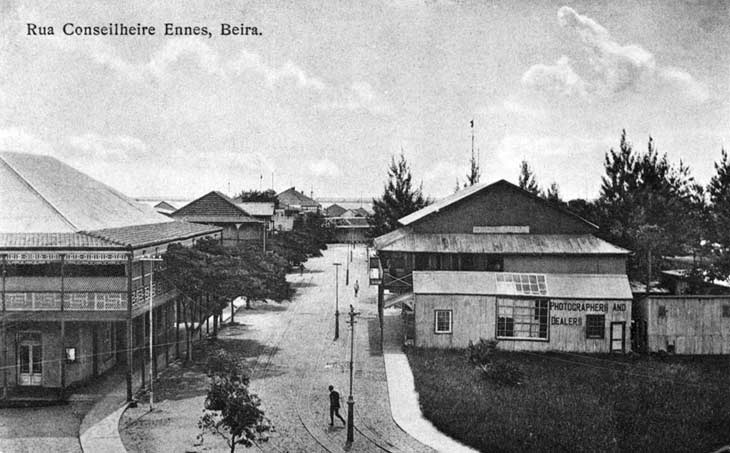
View of Rua Conselheiro Ennes, Beira, c. 1905

The city was established in 1890 by the Portuguese and soon supplanted Sofala as the main port in the Portuguese-administered territory. Originally called Chiveve, after a local river, it was renamed to honor the Portuguese Crown prince Dom Luís Filipe who, in 1907, was the first member of the Portuguese royal family to visit Mozambique. Traditionally the Portuguese Crown prince carried the title of Prince of Beira, a historical province of mainland Portugal.

The Portuguese built the port and a railway to Rhodesia, Portuguese families settled in the newly founded locality and started to develop commercial activities. With the growth of the village, in 1907 the Portuguese Crown elevated Beira to the status of city (cidade). Headquarters of the Companhia de Moçambique (Mozambique Company) from 1891, the city's administration passed from the trading company to the Portuguese government in 1942.

In 1966, the construction of a new railway station was completed. Before Mozambique's independence from Portugal, as a city of Portuguese Mozambique, Beira was noted for its well-equipped seaport, one of the major facilities of its kind in all East Africa, tourism, fishing and trade. The city prospered as a cosmopolitan port with different ethnic communities (Portuguese, Indian, Chinese, Bantus such as the Sena and Ndau) employed in administration, commerce, and industry.

A large English-speaking population was the result of being a favourite holiday destination for white Rhodesians. One reminder of this is the Grande Hotel, built by the Portuguese, near the shore of the Indian Ocean. By 1970, the city of Beira had 113,770 inhabitants.

=== Independence ===
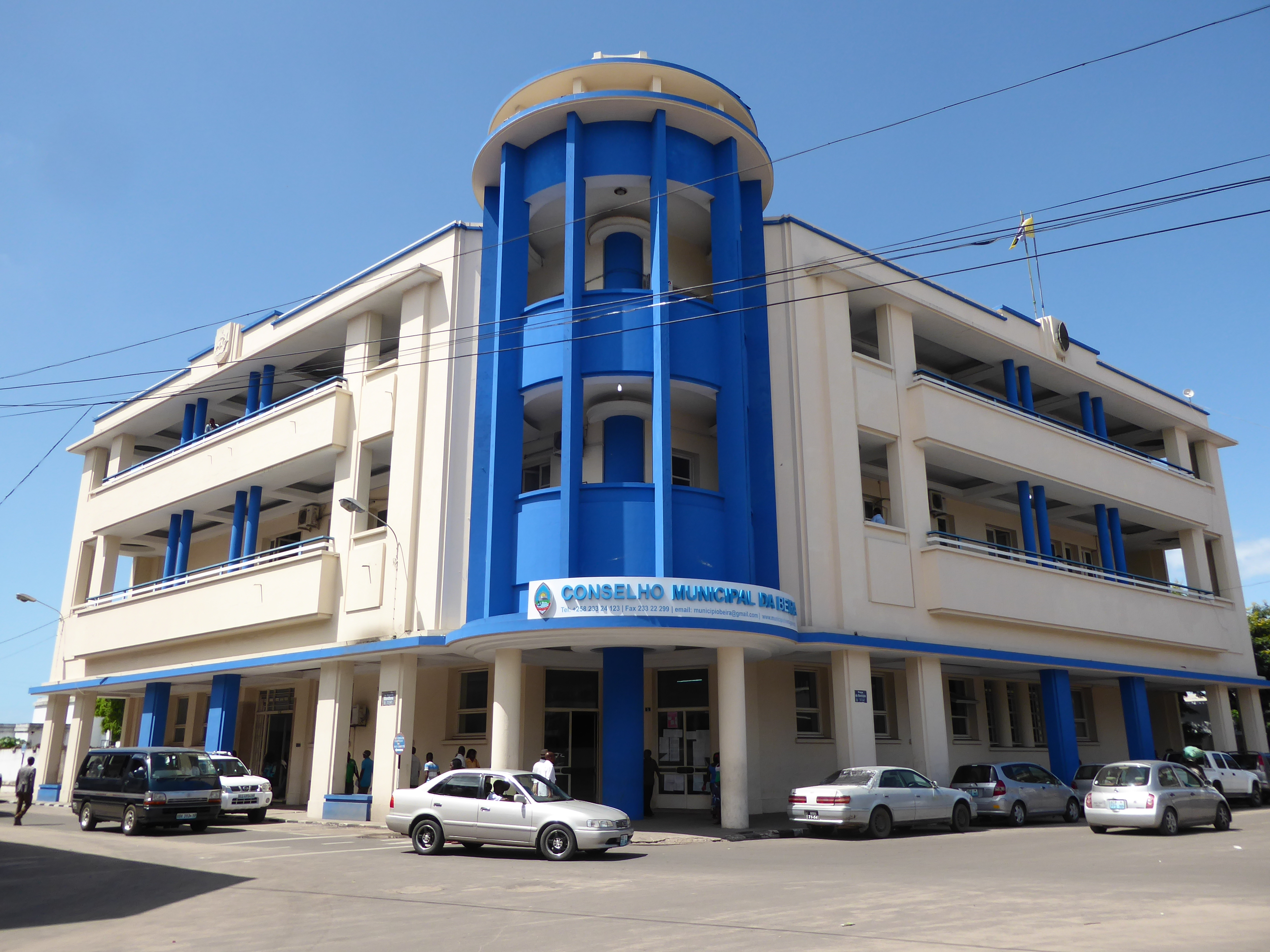
Townhall of Beira

After independence from Portugal in 1975, many white ethnic Portuguese left the city. Mozambique was ravaged by a civil war from 1977 to 1992, opposing Marxist FRELIMO, which controlled the government, to the rebels of RENAMO, descending to near total chaos in a couple of years. The famine, disease and poverty-stricken country collapsed. In Beira, the famous Grande Hotel was occupied by around 1,000 homeless Beirans, and by the end of the civil war it was in near-ruins.

The 2000 Mozambique flood devastated Beira and the surrounding region, leaving millions homeless and severely damaging the local economy.

During the campaign for the local elections in 2013, which culminated in the victory of the Democratic Movement of Mozambique (MDM) in the municipality, the Munhava district was the scene of violent clashes between police and supporters of the MDM.

In 2019, Cyclone Idai caused extreme devastation in Beira. It struck the city on March 14, 2019, with winds of up to 177 km/h (106 mph), and caused flooding up to six meters deep across Mozambique.

== Climate ==
Beira features a tropical savanna climate (Köppen Aw). Average temperature in January is 27.6 °C (82 °F) and in July (the coldest month) it's 20.3 °C (69 °F). The rainy season runs roughly from November to April.

Climate data for Beira (Beira Airport) (1991–2020 normals, extremes 1961–1990, 2007–2023)
Month	Jan	Feb	Mar	Apr	May	Jun	Jul	Aug	Sep	Oct	Nov	Dec	Year
Record high °C (°F)	40.0 (104.0)	39.3 (102.7)	38.5 (101.3)	37.5 (99.5)	36.8 (98.2)	35.8 (96.4)	35.5 (95.9)	39.6 (103.3)	40.1 (104.2)	43.4 (110.1)	43.0 (109.4)	41.0 (105.8)	43.4 (110.1)
Mean daily maximum °C (°F)	31.4 (88.5)	31.4 (88.5)	30.9 (87.6)	29.1 (84.4)	28.1 (82.6)	26.6 (79.9)	25.4 (77.7)	26.7 (80.1)	28.1 (82.6)	29.4 (84.9)	30.5 (86.9)	31.1 (88.0)	29.1 (84.3)
Daily mean °C (°F)	28.0 (82.4)	27.9 (82.2)	27.3 (81.1)	25.5 (77.9)	23.5 (74.3)	21.5 (70.7)	21.0 (69.8)	21.8 (71.2)	23.6 (74.5)	25.3 (77.5)	26.7 (80.1)	27.4 (81.3)	25.0 (76.9)
Mean daily minimum °C (°F)	24.6 (76.3)	24.6 (76.3)	24.4 (75.9)	22.1 (71.8)	19.6 (67.3)	17.6 (63.7)	16.9 (62.4)	17.4 (63.3)	19.7 (67.5)	21.4 (70.5)	22.7 (72.9)	24.1 (75.4)	21.3 (70.3)
Record low °C (°F)	18.5 (65.3)	19.0 (66.2)	18.5 (65.3)	15.4 (59.7)	11.0 (51.8)	8.3 (46.9)	8.2 (46.8)	10.1 (50.2)	12.0 (53.6)	13.1 (55.6)	16.2 (61.2)	17.0 (62.6)	8.2 (46.8)
Average precipitation mm (inches)	250.7 (9.87)	302.3 (11.90)	274.4 (10.80)	139.6 (5.50)	84.6 (3.33)	48.3 (1.90)	47.0 (1.85)	42.4 (1.67)	24.6 (0.97)	38.0 (1.50)	110.3 (4.34)	231.6 (9.12)	1,593.8 (62.75)
Average precipitation days (≥ 1.0 mm)	10.8	12.5	11.7	8.2	7.0	7.2	7.7	5.4	3.4	5.1	7.3	10.2	96.5
Average relative humidity (%)	76	78	77	77	77	76	78	77	76	74	74	76	76
Mean monthly sunshine hours	244.9	226.0	241.8	246.0	254.2	222.0	232.5	254.2	243.0	257.3	228.0	235.6	2,885.5
Mean daily sunshine hours	7.9	8.0	7.8	8.2	8.2	7.4	7.5	8.2	8.1	8.3	7.6	7.6	7.9
Source 1: World Meteorological Organization (precipitation 1961–1990) Starlings Roost Weather
Source 2: Deutscher Wetterdienst (extremes, humidity and sun 1961–1990)

== Water and sanitation ==
Access to drinking water and sanitation in Mozambique was historically a major problem, like many of the sub-Saharan African nations. It has been estimated that in developing countries, around 80% of all disease arises as a direct result of inadequate sanitation, poor hygiene, and contaminated water.

According to the United Nations Environment Programme, each day around 6,000 people die from diseases caused by poor sanitation, while another 300 million Africans have no access to clean water.

For Mozambique in 1992, only around a fifth of the country's households had access to potable water and the situation for wastewater provision was even worse. This was a serious public health issue in an area where cholera, dysentery and other water-borne diseases are endemic.

With the inauguration of the new water treatment plant at Mutua in May 2007, an important milestone was achieved in Mozambique's ambitious drive towards improving its provision of potable water and sanitation.

Doubling the supply of water to the cities of Beira and Dondo, the plant was opened by the country's President Armando Emílio Guebuza the day after he formally launched the next stage of the project to deal with Beira's sewage. Construction of the Beira treatment plant was carried out over a period of 30 months and was completed in June 2012.

This latest part of the scheme consists of rehabilitating the existing sanitation network, together with the construction of a number of new system elements to extend and upgrade the sewers, wastewater treatment facilities and a drainage system.

The new water plant cost €5.6m, while the Beira sanitation system cost €62.65m, with the EU providing €52.95m, and the remaining €9.7m provided by the Mozambique Government.

== Demographics ==
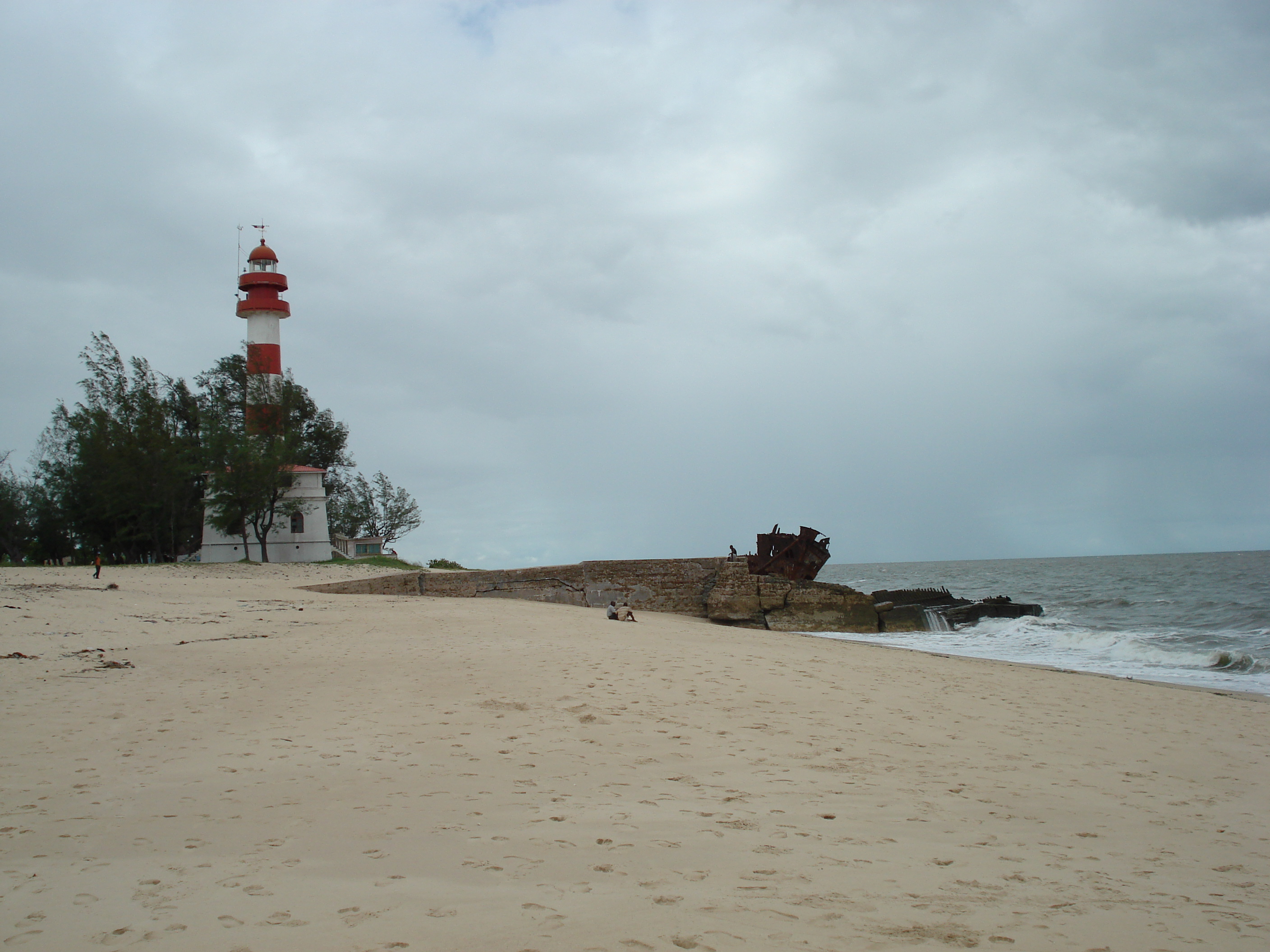
Beira, Central Mozambique

Year (census)	Population
1997	397,368
2007	431,583
2019	530,604

== Transportation ==
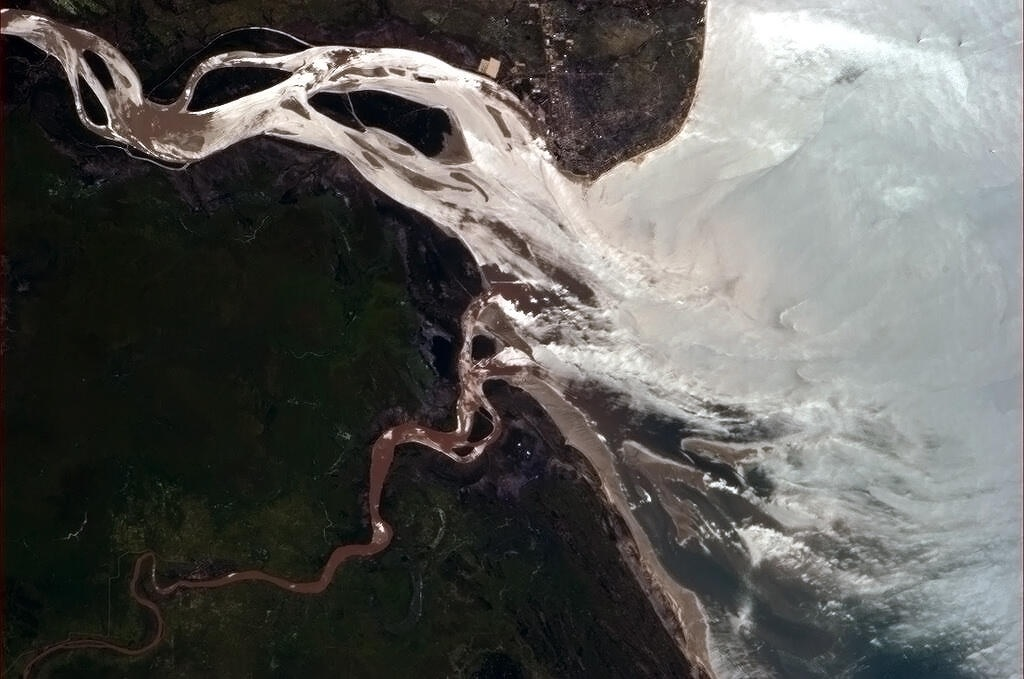
Beira, at the mouth of Rio Púnguè, as seen from the International Space Station

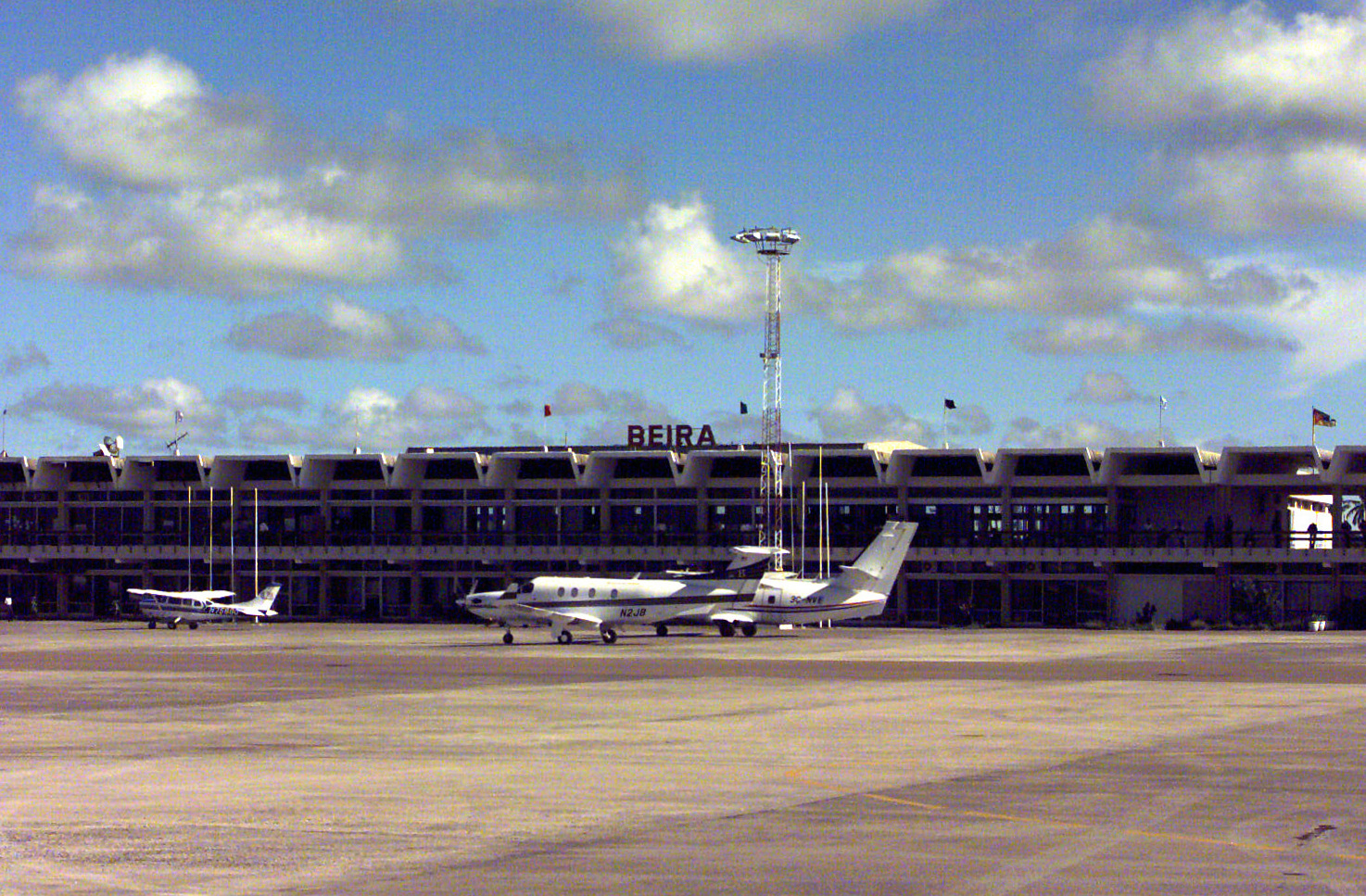
Beira Airport

Beira has long been a major trade point for exports coming in and out of Zimbabwe, Malawi, Zambia and other Southern African nations. Because of this, the port of Beira is the second largest in Mozambique.

The importance of the port was shown during the Mozambique Civil War, when Zimbabwean troops protected the Beira–Bulawayo railway and Beira to Mutare highway in order to continue trade. The railway to Zimbabwe was originally 610 mm (2 ft) in 1890, but was converted to 1,067 mm (3 ft 6 in) in 1900.

In 2008, the Mozambique transportation minister, Paulo Zucula, stated that the government is planning on modernizing the Beira and more northern Nacala ports for an estimated cost of $900m; $500m and 400m respectively. The government has also stated that it plans on modernizing surrounding railway and highway infrastructure so that the port is better connected to the nation's mines.

There is also a ferry service in Beira, linking the city to neighboring cities, including Nova Sofala and other coastal towns. Beira is served by an airport to the northeast of the city, with both domestic and international flights.

== Education ==
The city has three public university campuses, namely the Zambeze University (with headquarters and rectory in the city), the Licungo University and the Higher Institute of Health Sciences.

One of the major universities here is the Catholic University of Mozambique which was established in 1996 by the Catholic church and affiliated with the International Federation of Catholic Universities (IFCU). This private university is locally known as Universidade Catolica de Mocambique (UCM) and has been officially recognized by Mozambique's Ministry of Education and Culture (or Ministério da Educação e Cultura) which oversees the overall education system.

A second major university is the Jean Piaget University of Mozambique, locally termed da Universidade Jean Piaget de Moçambique(UNIPIAGET). This Portugal based University was founded in 2004 by Instituto Piaget, a non-profit cooperative, and is just one of seven campuses established across the globe.

There is a Portuguese international school, Escola Portuguesa da Beira.

== Places of worship ==
Among the places of worship, they are predominantly Christian churches and temples: Roman Catholic Archdiocese of Beira (Catholic Church), Reformed Church in Mozambique, Igreja Presbiteriana de Moçambique (both World Communion of Reformed Churches), Convenção Baptista de Moçambique (Baptist World Alliance), Universal Church of the Kingdom of God, Assemblies of God, Zion Christian Church, and The Church of Jesus Christ of Latter Day Saints.

== Sports ==
The city is home to Clube Ferroviário da Beira (basketball).

== International relations ==
Beira has been twinned with Bristol, UK, since 1990 and the Bristol-Beira Link manages a range of projects in education, culture, commerce, and disability.

=== Twin towns – sister cities ===
Beira is twinned with:

- Bristol, United Kingdom (since 1990)
- Porto, Portugal
- Boston, United States (since 1990)
- Padua, Italy
- Coimbra, Portugal (since 1997)
- Bender, Moldova
- Luanda, Angola
- Gqeberha, South Africa (since 2008)

== Notable people ==
- Mia Couto (born 1955), writer
- Pedro Boese (born 1972), artist
- Carlos Cardoso (1951-2000), journalist
- Tasha de Vasconcelos (born 1966), actress, top model
- Reinildo Mandava (born 1994), association football player

== See also ==
- Beira Patrol
- Cultural Beira
- Desportivo Manica
- Lumumba (film)
- Masterplan Beira 2035
- Roman Catholic Archdiocese of Beira

== Bibliography ==
- Derman, Bill; Kaarhus, Randi (May 2013). In the Shadow of a Conflict. Crisis in Zimbabwe and Its Effects in Mozambique, South Africa and Zambia. African Books Collective. ISBN 978-1-77922-217-6.
