= Pedro Boese =

German/Portuguese painter

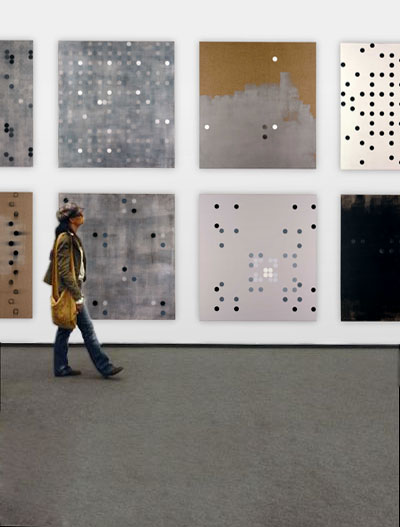
Grids and Grooves (2008)

Pedro Boese (born 1972) is a German/Portuguese painter.

== Life and work ==
Pedro Boese was born in Beira, Portuguese Mozambique.

- 1993–1997: graduation from the Academie Beeldende Kunsten Maastricht in painting and etching
- 1998–2001: postgraduate study at the Institut für Kunst im Kontext, Berlin University of the Arts
- 2000–2002: guest student at the class of Prof. Lothar Baumgarten, Berlin University of the Arts
- Lives and works in Berlin, Germany

The compositions of Pedro Boese exclusively arise from the overlapping of coloured and geometric circles in the picture plane. The painting material is usually applied thinly and translucently without developing a clear texture. Therefore, excluding the precisely set outlines, the subjective painting impression is objectified to a large extent. Boese's recent works have been based on a grid system.

== Awards ==
- 2011 Arts funding of the Cultural management of the Berlin Senate
- 2010 nomination for the International André-Evard Art Award, Messmer Foundation, Riegel
- 2006 nomination for the Gasag Art Award, Berlin
- 2008 nomination for the Guasch Coranty Award, Centre Cultural Metropolità, Barcelona
- 2007 nomination for the art award of the Bosch Rexroth AG, and IHK Würzburg

== Selected solo exhibitions ==
- 2011 monomodul, Elisengallery - Raum für Kunst, Aachen
- 2008/2009 Motive, MARS, Berlin
- 2007 269 Colors + Interferences, Scotty Enterprises Gallery, Berlin
- 2006 keine gewissheit für die augen, Gallery Weisser Elefant, Berlin
- 2006 repulsion, projectspace Gebauerhöfe, Berlin
- 2006 Art Forum of the Pax-Bank Berlin
- 2004 Art Forum of the DONG energy, Kopenhagen

== Selected group exhibitions ==
- 2012 Dot.Systems-from Pointillism to Pixelization, Wilhelm-Hack-Museum, Ludwigshafen
- 2010 Messmer Foundation, Riegel
- 2009 Farbe konkret, Gallery Nord / Kunstverein Tiergarten, Berlin
- 2008 Centre Cultural Metropolità Tecla Sala, Barcelona
- 2008 La intimidad y el distanciamiento, Museo para la Identidad Nacional, Tegucigalpa, Honduras
- 2007 The Art of Drive and Control, Bosch Rexroth AG, IHK Würzburg
- 2007 La intimidad y el distanciamiento, Museo de Arte de El Salvador, San Salvador
- 2005 Abstrakte Perspektiven, Gallery Nord/Kunstverein Tiergarten, Berlin
- 2004 Große Kunstausstellung, Villa Kobe, Halle

== Works in public collections ==
- Berlin State Museums, Museum of Prints and Drawings
- Museum Folkwang Essen, Craphics Collection
- Kunstmuseum Basel, Kupferstichkabinett
- Art collection of the Bosch Rexroth AG, Lohr am Main
- Collection Golden Tulip Hospitality Group, Berlin
- Collection Danish Oil & Natural Gas, Copenhagen

== See also ==
- List of German painters
