= Police Medal for Meritorious Service (Rhodesia) =

- Ribbon of the Police Medal for Meritorious Service
- Awarded for: Meritorious service
- Country: Rhodesia
- Presented by: President of Rhodesia
- Post-nominals: PMM
- Status: No longer awarded

The Police Medal for Meritorious Service was a medal in the Republic of Rhodesia awarded to police officers for Meritorious Service.

== History ==
The Police Medal for Meritorious Service was a Republic of Rhodesia medal awarded to personnel of the British South Africa Police (national police service of Rhodesia) for Meritorious Service. Since 1980, when Rhodesia became Zimbabwe, the medals an honour of Rhodesia were released by the Orders, decorations, and medals of Zimbabwe.

The post-nominal of the Police Medal for Meritorious Service is PMM.

== Description ==
From left to right, the ribbon is green, yellow, blue, yellow green. There are three main sections, consisting of green and blue with small sections of yellow between the main sections.

== See also ==
- Orders, decorations, and medals of Rhodesia
