= Rhodesian District Service Medal =

District Service Medal (Rhodesia)
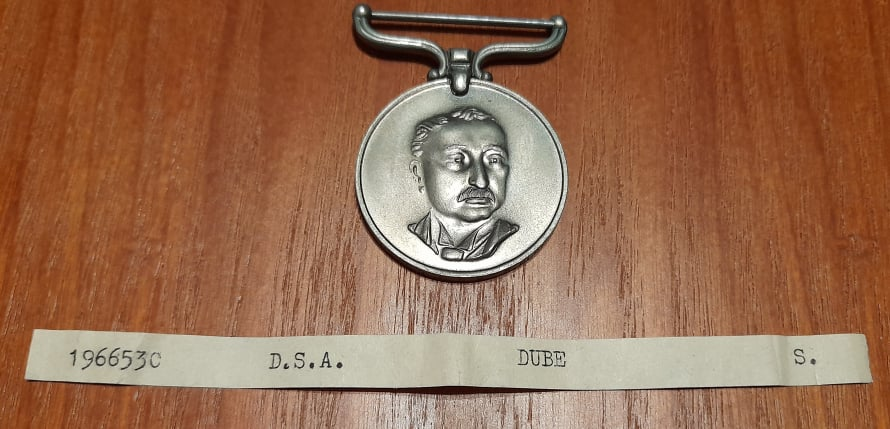
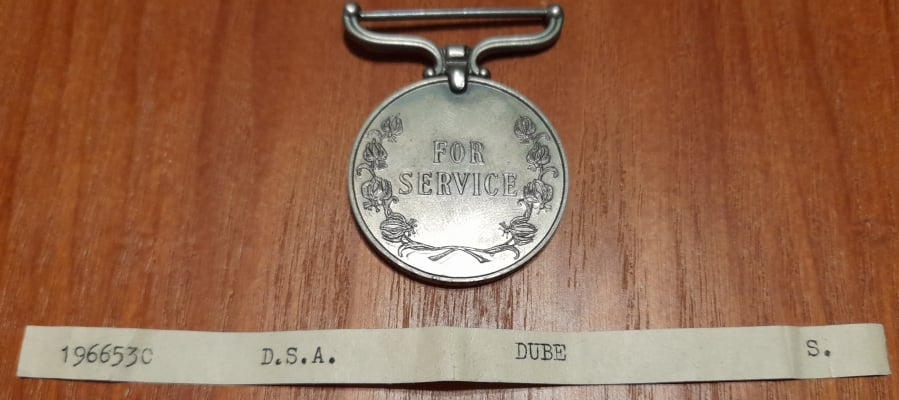
- Obverse and reverse of the medal to 196653C DSA Dube, S.
- Type: Internal Affairs (INTAF) campaign medal
- Awarded for: Service on operations combatting terrorists or enemy incursions into Rhodesia.
- Description: Obverse is a portrait of Cecil Rhodes, as on the General Service Medal (Rhodesia). Reverse contains the words "FOR SERVICE" surrounded by a wreath of flame lilies.
- Country: Rhodesia (1965–70); Republic of Rhodesia (1970–79); Zimbabwe Rhodesia
- Eligibility: African members of INTAF.
- Campaign: Rhodesian Bush War
- Status: Discontinued

Order of Wear
- Next (higher): General Service Medal (Rhodesia)
- Next (lower): Prison Service Medal

The District Service Medal (DSM) was a medal awarded in lieu of the General Service Medal (Rhodesia) (GSM) for service on operations undertaken for the purpose of combating terrorists or enemy incursions into Rhodesia. It was awarded solely to African members of INTAF in uniform. This is unusual as non-whites in all other branches qualified for the General Service Medal or the Prison General Service Medal . The DSM is therefore the only racially exclusive service medal in the Rhodesian Honours System.

== Medal ==
The medal bears a relief portrait of Cecil Rhodes on the obverse and the words "FOR SERVICE" surrounded by a wreath of flame lilies on the reverse. The ribbon of the medal is a plain, dark blue. The medal was impressed in small capitals with the recipient's name, rank and service number on the rim.

== Recipients ==
5470 Rhodesian District Service Medals were issued. Awards were not gazetted, and no full roll of recipients has ever been published.
