= Military Forces' Commendation =

Military Forces Commendation
- GSM ribbon with Military Forces Commendation
- Type: Military decoration
- Awarded for: To denote an act of bravery, distinguished service, or continuous devotion to duty in the operational or non-operational sphere.
- Description: A silver or bronze pick device
- Country: Republic of Rhodesia
- Presented by: President of Rhodesia
- Status: No longer awarded

The Military Forces Commendation was a military decoration awarded by the Republic of Rhodesia.

== History ==
The Military Forces' Commendation was created "to denote an act of bravery, distinguished service, or continuous devotion to duty in the operational or non-operational sphere."

The device would be displayed on the ribbon of the General Service Medal .

== Description ==
A silver or bronze pick (silver for within the operational sphere, bronze for outside the operational sphere affixed centrally to the Rhodesian General Service Medal ribbon).
