= Masterplan Beira 2035 =

Water management plan for the city of Beira, Mozambique

Masterplan Beira 2035 is a program meant to overhaul the water management infrastructure for the city of Beira, Mozambique, with the intent of allowing for future urban development. The plan was created in partnership primarily between the city of Beira and the Dutch engineering and consultancy firm Witteveen+Bos. This perceived urban renewal is to help mitigate the effects of the increasing ferocity and frequency of environmental phenomena in the region, which have been heavily influenced by climate change.

== Background ==
Beira is a coastal city that sits at a very low elevation, one that is only slightly above sea level. Due to this fact, as well as Mozambique's vulnerability to climate change, the city is becoming more susceptible to flooding and other water related issues. Furthermore, the city's coastal tide and sea overflow defenses, both natural and artificial, are failing. This has resulted in Coastal erosion, leading to severe flooding, which has numerous impacts on the community, including disruptions in movement and accessibility, economic damages, environmental degradation, and health problems, such as increased cases of Malaria and Cholera.

In order to combat these problems, Masterplan Beira 2035 designed a new urban drainage scheme and reinforced coastal defenses. In regards to stormwater and flooding alleviation, Beira plans on building deeper drainage channels, which will flow into a new 150 hectare Retention basin connected to the outer-lying wetlands and ocean. In order to address coastal defenses, the city aims to dredge the harbor, duo remove the increased sediment left by the higher sea level. The recovered sand from the Dredging process will be reused to reinforce natural coast protection areas. The built-up sand and debris has impeded large trade ships from accessing the crucial port, suppressing the city's economic potential. Additionally these projects will also help spur the tourism industry, as the retention basin will also serve as a lagoon while the sand removed will be used in part to create bigger beaches.

In addition to these changes in infrastructure, the plan also aims to address current land use issues, especially in areas prone to flooding. Due to the city's population growth over the last couple years, and its future projections, Masterplan Beira 2035 plans on implementing changes to land ownership and development policies, in an attempt to stop settlements, which usually lack basic infrastructure, from being constructed in flood prone areas. This could minimize future relief costs as well as protect people's economic and transportation mobility.

There seems to be little opposition to this plan, however, a major setback occurred in March 2019. Cyclone Idai inflicted substantial damage to the city, destroying around 90% of the area. Furthermore, hundreds of people were killed, and thousands were displaced, resulting in additional problems with safe and sustainable housing. Beira plans to utilize the masterplan during and after the relief plan.
