= Dan Stannard =

Zimbabwean policeman (1937–2023)

David "Dan" Stannard (28 November 1937 – 30 March 2023) was a Zimbabwean policeman who became a Branch Director of the Central Intelligence Organisation, under Ken Flower, thus serving under both the Ian Smith and Robert Mugabe administrations. He subsequently became manager of Zimbabwe's cricket team in addition to overseeing security for the Zimbabwe Cricket Union.

== Life and career ==
David Stannard was born in Peshawar on 28 November 1937 in what is now Pakistan, but which at the time was part of the North-West Frontier Province of British India, to British parents. In 1947, they left Asia and returned to the United Kingdom, settling in Lichfield and later Liverpool.

Stannard emigrated to Southern Rhodesia and joined the British South Africa Police (BSAP) in March 1957, becoming a career policeman, and a detective in the Criminal Investigation Department (CID), serving with distinction. During his tenure in the CID, he served in several specialist sections, including the Fraud Squad and later headed the section dealing with serious crimes of violence. Early in his career, he was responsible for investigating the Crocodile Gang (a member of which was eventually to become his political master) for murders and other serious crimes while stationed in the Manicaland Province. At one time he investigated elements of Rhodesia's most prestigious military unit – the Selous Scouts – concerning allegations of poaching and ivory trafficking. Dan Stannard was seconded to the Rhodesian Special Branch (SB) as Acting Provincial Special Branch Officer, Salisbury and Mashonaland, shortly before Zimbabwean independence.

At the time of Independence in 1980, Stannard was appointed the official Liaison Officer to work with both ZANU and ZAPU guerrillas who were then based at the Audio Visual Centre at the University. After independence he was transferred to Special Branch Headquarters, where he became Deputy Director (Internal) (DDIN) of Branch I, under Mike Reeves.

Stannard later served as the Director Internal (DIN) of CIO, effectively the head of the Rhodesian Special Branch and oversaw internal intelligence-gathering for the CIO. At the time Zimbabwe was celebrating its new found independence, Stannard foiled an assassination attempt on Zimbabwean presidential elect Robert Mugabe by a South African fifth column in 1980, an event for which he was awarded the Gold Cross of Zimbabwe.

As a senior adviser to the post-independence regime, Stannard and many former Rhodesian agents were retained to train their successors. Emmerson Mnangagwa, the first minister of security, transferred all SB members into the CIO to obviate intelligence getting into the possession of Joshua Nkomo, who was then Minister of Home Affairs. The modus operandi of Rhodesia's campaign to infiltrate political parties, silence public demonstrations, and destabilise action groups during the colonial period were thus passed on to a new generation of partisan intelligence operatives.

After retiring from the CIO in 1992, Stannard became manager of the Zimbabwe cricket team. As many white cricketers had family affected by the government's chaotic land redistribution efforts, he found himself petitioning for their farms on their behalf, but not always with success. In 2003, Stannard left Zimbabwe and at some point resettled in the UK.

Stannard's brother Richard, a former British military policeman, was a public relations officer for the Rhodesian Security Forces during the long-running bush war. Richard later joined the Zimbabwe Intelligence Corps to serve alongside Dan. Their nephew, also Richard Stannard, was a much-decorated veteran of the Rhodesian SAS and South African Special Forces who later became embroiled with an attempted coup d'etat in the Seychelles.

Dan Stannard died in Ely, Cambridgeshire on 30 March 2023, at the age of 85.
