= Orders, decorations, and medals of Zimbabwe =

The Zimbabwean honours system was instituted in late 1980 to replace the Rhodesian honours system. The first award that was instituted was the Independence Medal, which was awarded to those who were involved in the Zimbabwean independence commemorations in some way. The Zimbabwean honours system includes a range of orders, gallantry decorations, gallantry medals, and service medals.

== National orders ==
- The Zimbabwe Order of Merit
  - (military)
  - (civil)
- The Order of the Great Zimbabwe
- The Royal Order of Munhumutapa
- The Order of the Star of Zimbabwe

== Bravery awards ==
- Gold Cross of Zimbabwe
- Silver Cross of Zimbabwe
- Bronze Cross of Zimbabwe
- Medal for Meritorious Service
- Commendation Medal

== Commemorative awards ==
- Liberation Decoration
- Liberation Medal
- Independence Medal
- The Mozambique Campaign Medal
- The Democratic Republic of Congo Campaign Medal

== Service awards ==
- Long and Exemplary Service Medal
- Public Service Long Service Medal
- Efficiency Medal
- President's Medal for Shooting
- Service Medal
