= Rhodesia Badge of Honour =

- Ribbon of the Badge of Honour
- Awarded for: Long service and devotion to duty in Government, Municipal or private service
- Description: A bronze, 36mm x 44mm oval medal, the obverse carries a silver Zimbabwe bird on a rectangular green background. The reverse is plain and carries the name of the recipient.
- Country: Republic of Rhodesia
- Presented by: President of Rhodesia
- Status: No longer awarded

The Rhodesia Badge of Honour (BoH) was a medal awarded by the government of the Republic of Rhodesia 'for long service and devotion to duty in Government, Municipal or private service.'

== History of the Badge ==
The Rhodesia Badge of Honour has been compared commonly to the British Order of the Companions of Honour.

The Rhodesia Badge of Honour, unlike all other Rhodesian medals, was awarded as a gift from the President of Rhodesia; just as the British Order of the Companions of Honour is a gift from the Sovereign of the United Kingdom.

== Description ==
A bronze, 36mm x 44mm oval medal, the obverse carries a silver Zimbabwe bird on a rectangular green background. The reverse is plain and carries the name of the recipient. The ribbon is a solid gold colour.
