= Munhava =

District in Beira, Mozambique

Munhava, or the District of Munhava, is a central district in Beira, the second most populous city in Mozambique. Munhava is the largest constituency of the city. The Maraza is a part of the neighborhood of Munhava that has suffered from a high degree of dilapidation with poor road quality and houses taking the form of favelas.

During the campaign for the local elections in 2013, the district was the scene of violent clashes between the Rapid Intervention Force (FIR) and supporters of Daviz Simango, the leader of the Democratic Movement of Mozambique (MDM), culminating in an MDM victory.
