= GD Manica =

- Full name: Grupo Desportivo de Manica
- Ground: FutEco Park, Manica, Mozambique
- Capacity: 10,000
- League: Moçambola 2 (Center Zone) & Manica Provincial League

Grupo Desportivo de Manica is a traditional football club based in Manica Province, Mozambique, which currently competes in the Moçambola 2 and Manica Provincial League. The club was founded in 1980. Desportivo Manica reached the Interprovincial Stage of the Taça de Moçambique in 2009. Desportivo Manica won three consecutive Manica Provincial League championships from 2006 to 2008.

== Stadium ==
The club plays their home matches at FutEco Park located in Manica, which was funded with a grant from FIFA.
