= Police Cross for Conspicuous Gallantry =

- Type: civil decoration
- Awarded for: Conspicuous gallantry by a police officer in the line of duty.
- Presented by: Rhodesia
- Post-nominals: PCG
- Status: No longer awarded
- Established: 4 November 1970
- Ribbon bar of the decoration

Precedence
- Next (higher): Independence Commemorative Decoration
- Next (lower): Silver Cross of Rhodesia

The Police Decoration for Gallantry was a Rhodesian gallantry award. A handful were awarded for conspicuous gallantry to members of the British South Africa Police, Police Support Unit and Police Reserve.

== Institution ==
The award was instituted in 1970 by Presidential Warrant, the first award being made in June 1975. The last award was made in September 1978. The award was the police equivalent of the Silver Cross of Rhodesia and, because of the BSAP's seniority, ranked ahead it in the official order of precedence.

== Medal ==
The medal was a gold-plated sterling silver cross, enamelled in Oxford blue, bearing a roundel in the centre struck with the gold "wounded lion" device of the BSAP on a white field. The cross was suspended from an Oxford blue ribbon with two narrow stripes of scarlet, edged with silver , very similar to that of the British Queen's Police Medal, which it replaced. The medal was impressed in small capitals with the recipient's name on the reverse, and was awarded with a case of issue, miniature medal for wear, and an illuminated certificate.

== Recipients ==
Five awards were made. Notable awards included that made to Patrol Officer Derrick Edwards, who was awarded the medal in 1977. During an insurgent attack Edwards rescued a wounded officer and his group's radio under heavy fire, despite being shot in the right thigh and twice in the left leg. While indicating that morphine should be given to the other wounded officer, P.O. Edwards insisted on using the radio himself to summon assistance.

Recipients were entitled to the post-nominal letters P.C.G.

Number	Rank	Name	Date
21149	Constable	C. Kampaundi	20 June 1975
8158	Patrol Officer	Derrick G. Edwards	25 March 1977
22150	Constable	S. M. Manyawu	25 March 1977
22327	Constable	E. Mazarire	5 August 1977
9440	Lance Section Officer	L. R. O'Brien	8 September 1978

== Zimbabwe ==
The Conspicuous Gallantry Decoration was superseded in October 1980 by the Silver Cross of Zimbabwe, which is awarded for conspicuous bravery in perilous conditions, but which is open for award to civilians as well as military personnel.

== See also ==
- Orders, decorations, and medals of Rhodesia
