= Conspicuous Gallantry Decoration =

- Type: Military decoration
- Awarded for: Gallantry and brave conduct of an outstanding order in a non-combatant capacity
- Country: Rhodesia
- Eligibility: Civilians or military personnel
- Post-nominals: CGD
- Established: 1970
- First award: 1977
- Final award: 1979

Highlights
- Total: 2
- Total recipients: Rudi Kogler; Jamie Scott
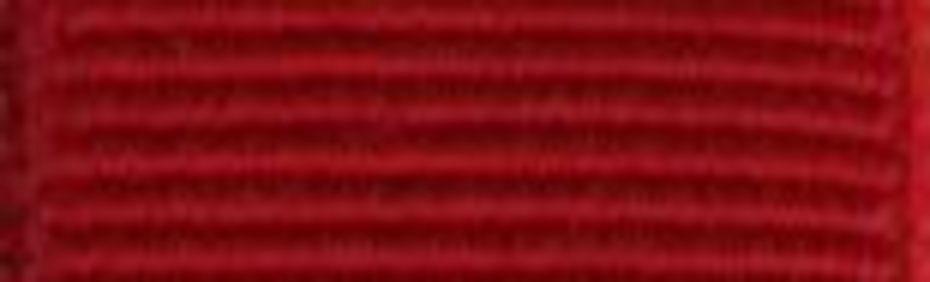
- Medal Ribbon

Precedence
- Next (higher): Grand Cross of Valour
- Next (lower): Silver Cross of Rhodesia

The Conspicuous Gallantry Decoration was Rhodesia's highest civil decoration and the second-highest award available to members of the armed forces. It was awarded for acts of the highest gallantry and brave conduct of an outstanding order in a non-combatant capacity.

== Institution ==
The award was instituted in 1970 by Presidential Warrant, the first award being made in 1977. The second and final award was made in 1979.

== Medal ==
The medal was a sterling silver circular medal bearing the "wounded lion" device used by the British South Africa Police, highlighted with gold plate; suspended by a V-shaped suspender from a bar bearing the motto RHODESIA, suspended by a scarlet ribbon. The medal was impressed in small capitals with the recipient's name on the rim, and was awarded with a case of issue, miniature medal for wear, and an illuminated certificate.

== Recipients ==
Just two awards of the Conspicuous Gallantry Decoration were gazetted. The first was made posthumously in 1977 to Austrian-born engineer Rudi Kogler, from Bulawayo, for his actions defending the Regina Mundi Mission in Matabeleland against an insurgent attack. Two years later, teenager Jamie Scott from Salisbury was awarded the medal for his valour in defending himself and a friend against an insurgent attack. Recipients were entitled to the post-nominal letters C.G.D.

Research carried out by the Zimbabwe Medal Society in 2003-5 indicates that there were probably at least two other awards of the Conspicuous Gallantry Decoration made to civilians, but for security reasons never published in the Rhodesian Government Gazette.

== Zimbabwe ==
The Conspicuous Gallantry Decoration was superseded in October 1980 by the Gold Cross of Zimbabwe, which is awarded for conspicuous bravery in perilous conditions, but which is open for award to civilians as well as military personnel.
