= Police Cross for Distinguished Service =

- Police Cross for Distinguished Service ribbon
- Awarded for: Distinguished Police Service
- Description: A silver and gold-plated 38mm Maltese Cross with, at the centre a gold lion and spear police crest on a circle of white enamel, surrounded by the words in gold lettering "For Distinguished Police Service" on a blue background.
- Country: Republic of Rhodesia
- Presented by: President of Rhodesia
- Post-nominals: PCD
- Clasps: Gold-plated bar for second award.
- Status: No longer awarded

The Police Cross for Distinguished Service was a medal awarded by the President of Rhodesia.

== History ==
The Police Cross for Distinguished Service was awarded for Distinguished Police Service.

== Description ==
A silver and gold-plated 38mm Maltese Cross with, at the centre a gold lion and spear police crest on a circle of white enamel, surrounded by the words in gold lettering "For Distinguished Police Service" on a blue background. The reverse is plain and carried the name of the recipient. The ribbon is two white bars on a dark blue background.
