= General Service Medal (Rhodesia) =

Rhodesia General Service Medal
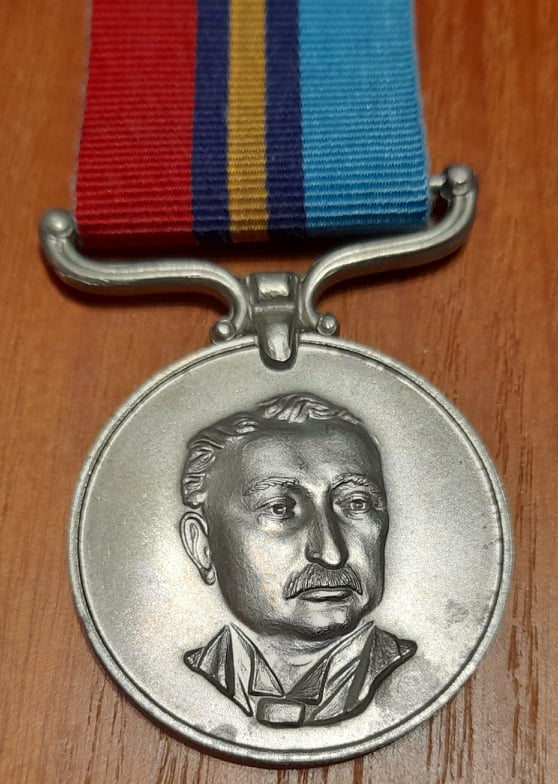
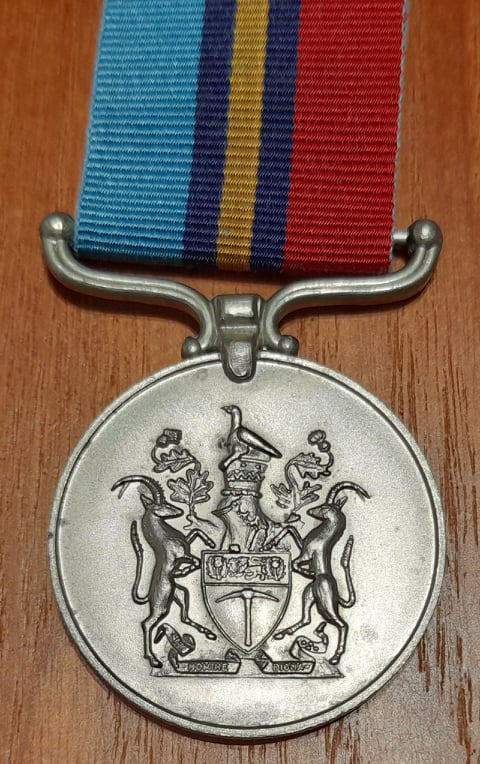
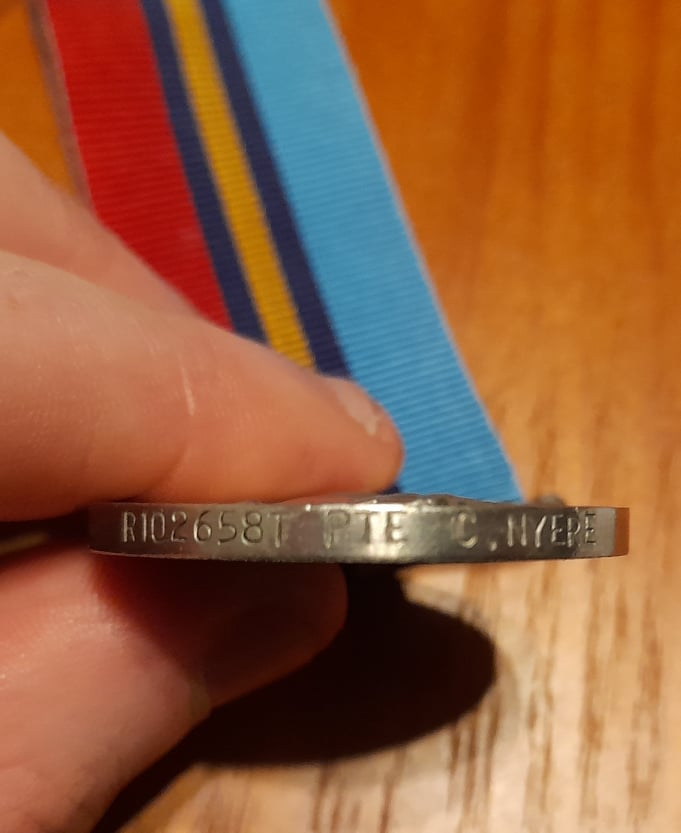
- Obverse, reverse and rim of the medal to R102658T Pte Nyere, C.
- Type: Military campaign medal
- Awarded for: Service on operations combatting terrorists or enemy incursions into Rhodesia.
- Country: Rhodesia 1965–70); Republic of Rhodesia (1970–79); Zimbabwe Rhodesia
- Presented by: President of Rhodesia from 1970
- Eligibility: All Ranks
- Campaign: Rhodesian Bush War
- Status: Discontinued in 1982
- Established: 1969
- First award: 1969
- Ribbon bar of the medal

Order of Wear
- Next (higher): President's Medal for Headmen
- Equivalent: Rhodesian District Service Medal
- Next (lower): Prison Service Medal

The Rhodesia General Service Medal was the most widely awarded military medal of Rhodesia. It was awarded to members of the security forces and British South Africa Police for service on operations undertaken for the purpose of combatting terrorists or enemy incursions into Rhodesia.

Some members of INTAF were conferred the Rhodesian District Service Medal instead of the General Service Medal.

== Institution ==
The medal was instituted in 1968. The medals appear to have been last issued in June 1980, although in 2002 the Zimbabwe National Army advertised their intention to dispose of 9,000 unclaimed medals, and invited recipients to claim them.

== Medal ==
The medal was struck in cupro-nickel by Matthews Manufacturing of Bulawayo, and bore a relief portrait of Cecil Rhodes on the obverse and the arms of Rhodesia on the reverse. The ribbon of the medal represented the British South Africa Police (central stripes of Oxford blue and old gold); the Rhodesian Army (guardsman red) and the Rhodesian Air Force (Cambridge blue). The medal was impressed in small capitals with the recipient's name, rank and service number on the rim.

== Recipients ==
"Tens of thousands" of Rhodesian General Service Medals were issued. Awards were not gazetted, and no full roll of recipients has ever been published.

It was known familiarly as the "First Street Medal" (after the main street in the capital city) as it was so widely awarded.

== Zimbabwe ==
The General Service Medal was superseded in 1982 by the Zimbabwe Service Medal, which is awarded to members or former members of the armed forces of Zimbabwe on completion of ten years' service.
