= Ronald Reid-Daly =

Rhodesian army officer

Ronald Reid-Daly CLM DMM MBE
- Born: Ronald Francis Reid-Daly; 22 September 1928; Salisbury, Southern Rhodesia
- Died: 9 August 2010 (aged 81); Simon's Town, South Africa
- Military career
- Allegiance: British Empire; Southern Rhodesia; Republic of Rhodesia; Republic of Transkei
- Branch: Rhodesian Army
- Years of service: 1951–1979
- Rank: Lieutenant colonel
- Unit: C Squadron 22 SAS
- Commands: Selous Scouts; Transkei Defence Force
- Conflicts: Malayan Emergency; Rhodesian Bush War
- Awards: Legion of Merit CLM Defence Forces' Medal for Meritorious Service DMM Order of the British Empire MBE

Ronald Francis Reid-Daly CLM DMM MBE (22 September 1928 – 9 August 2010) was a Rhodesian military officer who founded and commanded the Selous Scouts special forces unit that fought during the Rhodesian Bush War.

== Career ==
Reid-Daly, who was born in Salisbury, then capital of the British colony of Southern Rhodesia, entered military service in 1951, and served with the all-Rhodesian C Squadron of the 22 Special Air Service in counter-insurgency operations in the Federation of Malaya. He became a Member of the Order of the British Empire in 1963. Reid-Daly rose to the rank of regimental sergeant major in the Rhodesian Light Infantry, and was later commissioned and achieved the rank of captain. He retired from the army in 1973.

In late 1973, he was persuaded by General Peter Walls, then chief of the Rhodesian Army, to return to active duty in order to form the Selous Scouts, an elite special forces unit to combat the growing threat posed by communist guerrillas. Drawing on his Malayan experience, Lieutenant Colonel Reid-Daly built a skilled and highly professional regiment from scratch. Although the Selous Scouts achieved many of their military objectives, their unorthodox methods created tensions within the military hierarchy, with Reid-Daly having several brushes with the Rhodesian authorities.

In 1979, rumours surfaced in Salisbury that the Scouts were poaching ivory along the Zambezi valley. Reid-Daly dismissed the allegations as ridiculous. In the process of defending himself against them, Reid-Daly verbally attacked Major General John Hickman. For this he was charged with insubordination and sentenced to a reprimand. Disgusted, he resigned as the commander of the Scouts in August but continued to fight a legal battle against the judgement, proclaiming his innocence even after Rhodesia transformed into Zimbabwe Rhodesia, and only stopped doing so after he was forced to flee to South Africa in 1982.

In South Africa, Reid-Daly became commander of the Transkei Defence Force, from 1981 until his expulsion from Transkei in 1987, and he was subsequently the leader of the private security firm Security Services Transkei. For the final decade of his life, he resided near Cape Town. In his retirement, he authored several books on his wartime experiences. He was survived by his two children and two grandchildren.

== Awards ==
- Legion of Merit (Commander - Civilian) (CLM) (1976)
- Defence Forces' Medal for Meritorious Service (DMM) (1971)
- Order of the British Empire (Member) (MBE) (1963)

== Publications ==
- Selous Scouts: Top Secret War. Galago Publishing. 1982. ISBN 978-0-620-05771-4. with Peter Stiff
- Staying alive: a Southern African survival handbook. Ashanti. 1990. ISBN 978-1-874800-09-5.
- Pamwe Chete: The Legend of the Selous Scouts. Covos-Day. 1999. ISBN 978-0-620-23756-7.
