= Gold Cross of Zimbabwe =

- Type: Military decoration
- Awarded for: Conspicuous Valour
- Description: A metal cross with a four pointed star on it, and the traditional Zimbabwe bird symbol. The words "FOR BRAVERY" appear around the bird, and it hangs from a red ribbon.
- Country: Zimbabwe
- Post-nominals: G.C.Z.
- Established: 1980

Highlights
- Total: 8
- Ribbon bar of the order

The Gold Cross of Zimbabwe (Shona: Ndarama Muchinjikwa ye Zimbabwe) is Zimbabwe's highest military decoration awarded for conspicuous valour by members of the Security Forces in combat. It replaced the Grand Cross of Valour in October 1980.

== Recipients ==
- Danny Stannard
- Squadron Leader Earnest Matsambira
- Group Captain Ishmael Kadenga
- Group Captain Micheal Dhabha
- Major Charles Sambulo
- Corporal Samson Moyo
- Major Judgemore Cheuka (posthumously)
- Colonel Flint Magama (posthumously)
