= Bronze Cross of Zimbabwe =

- Type: gallantry decoration
- Awarded for: acts of conspicuous bravery in hazardous circumstances
- Eligibility: military and civilian personnel
- Status: currently constituted
- Ribbon bar of the order

Precedence
- Next (higher): Silver Cross of Zimbabwe
- Next (lower): Medal for Meritorious Service

The Bronze Cross of Zimbabwe is a gallantry decoration that was instituted in October 1980 to replace the Bronze Cross of Rhodesia.

It forms part of the Zimbabwean honours system. Recipients of the Bronze Cross of Zimbabwe are entitled to the use of the post-nominal letters BCZ after their name. The ribbon is purple.

This award is given to people who have shown bravery in hazardous situations.

== Recipients ==
- Giles Mutsekwa
