= Bronze Cross of Rhodesia =

Bronze Cross Of Rhodesia
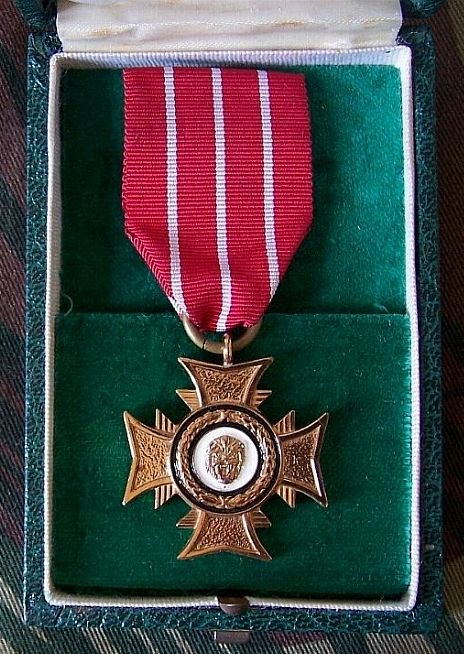
- The Bronze Cross Of Rhodesia (B.C.R.) in case of issue
- Type: Military decoration
- Awarded for: "... gallantry."
- Description: Bronze Maltese Cross with a full face bronze lion on a white enamelled circle with black edge and bronze laurel wreath.
- Eligibility: To members of the Rhodesian Army, Air Force, Armoured Car Regiment and Guard Force.
- Post-nominals: B.C.R.
- Campaign: Rhodesian Bush War.
- Clasps: Bronze clasp awarded for second award. Only one clasp ever awarded.
- Status: Hasn't been awarded since 1980.
- Established: instituted in 1970
- First award: 1970
- Final award: 1980

Highlights
- Total: 131
- Total awarded posthumously: 7
- Total recipients: 131
- BCR (Army) Ribbon

Precedence
- Next (higher): Silver Cross of Rhodesia (for conspicuous gallantry)
- Equivalent: The Police Decoration for Gallantry (for gallantry)
- Next (lower): Meritorious Conduct Medal (for brave and gallant conduct over and above the call of duty in a non-combatant capacity. The award may be awarded to both civilians and members of the Security Forces)

The Bronze Cross of Rhodesia was a Rhodesian military decoration for gallantry.

== Institution ==
The award was instituted in 1970 by Presidential Warrant, the first awards being made the same year. The last awards were made in June 1980.

== Medal ==
The medal was a bronze cross with an enamelled roundel in the centre bearing a lion's head, suspended from a ribbon. The ribbons of the Bronze Cross differed in colour according to the service in which the recipient was enlisted; thus Army awards had a red ribbon with three white stripes ; Air Force awards a purple ribbon with stripes and Guard Force awards a brown ribbon with stripes . The Army ribbon has a strong and no doubt accidental resemblance to the Canadian Forces' Decoration for long service. The medal was impressed in small capitals with the recipient's name on the reverse, and was awarded with a case of issue, miniature medal for wear, and an illuminated certificate.

== Recipients ==
A total of 131 awards of the Bronze Cross of Rhodesia were made, seven posthumously. Notable recipients included the author Alan Thrush, SAS officer Grahame Wilson and air force officer Norman Walsh. Recipients are entitled to the post-nominal letters B.C.R.

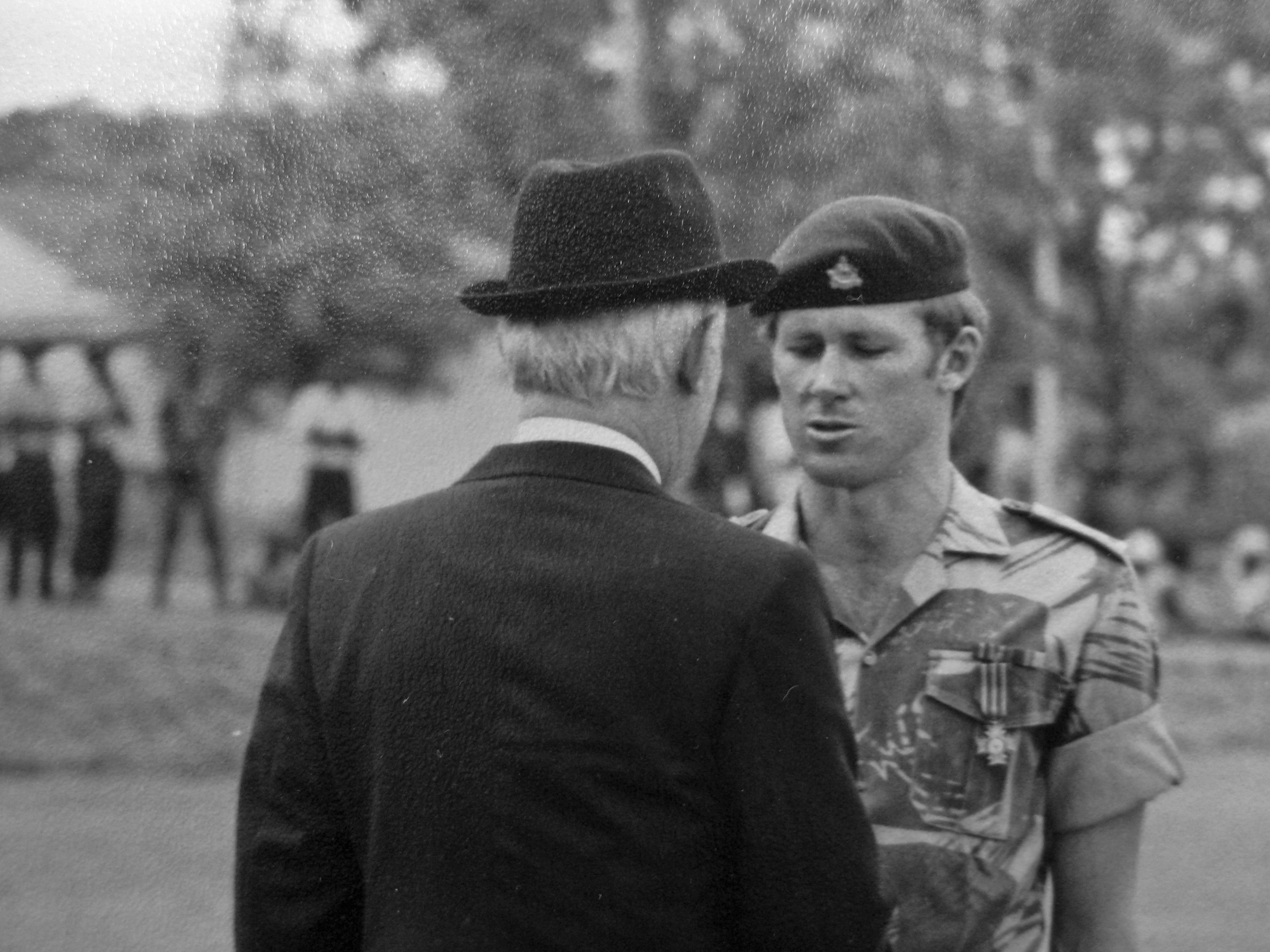
Nigel Theron receives Bronze Cross 1976

There was one award of a bar to the Bronze Cross, to a Selous Scouts corporal.

== Zimbabwe ==
The Bronze Cross of Rhodesia was superseded in October 1980 by the Bronze Cross of Zimbabwe, which is awarded for conspicuous bravery, and which is open for award to civilians as well as military personnel.
