= Defence Forces' Medal for Meritorious Service =

- Ribbon of the DMM
- Awarded for: Meritorious service.
- Description: A silver, 36mm circular medal carrying on the obverse the national armorial bearings. The reverse carries the lion and tusk and eagle emblems of the Combined Services, surrounded by a wreath of flame lilies, This is surrounded by the words "For Meritorious Service". The name of the recipient is etched on the rim.
- Country: Republic of Rhodesia
- Presented by: President of Rhodesia
- Post-nominals: DMM
- Clasps: A silver bar is for a second award.
- Status: No longer awarded.

The Defence Forces' Medal for Meritorious Service was a medal awarded by the Republic of Rhodesia.

== History ==
The Defence Forces' Medal for Meritorious Service was a medal awarded for Meritorious service to the Rhodesian Defence Forces.

== Description ==
A silver, 36mm circular medal carrying on the obverse the national armorial bearings. The reverse carries the lion and tusk and eagle emblems of the Combined Services, surrounded by a wreath of flame lilies, This is surrounded by the words "For Meritorious Service". The name of the recipient is etched on the rim of the medal. The ribbon is blue, red and green.
