= Silver Cross of Rhodesia =

- Type: Military decoration
- Awarded for: Conspicuous Gallantry
- Country: Rhodesia
- Post-nominals: SCR
- Status: Discontinued
- Established: 1970
- First award: 1974
- Final award: 1980

Highlights
- Total: 34
- Total awarded posthumously: 3 (Martin Pearse SAS, Bruce Thompson 2RAR and Bruce Snelgar 1RLI)
- Ribbon of the Silver Cross

Precedence
- Next (higher): Conspicuous Gallantry Decoration
- Next (lower): Bronze Cross of Rhodesia

The Silver Cross of Rhodesia was Rhodesia's second-highest military decoration for conspicuous gallantry.

It was the equivalent of the Distinguished Service Order, Distinguished Conduct Medal and Conspicuous Gallantry Medal, with all ranks eligible.

== Institution ==
The award was instituted in 1970 by Presidential Warrant, the first awards being made in 1974. The last awards were made in June 1980.

== Medal ==
The medal was a sterling silver cross with an enamelled roundel in the centre bearing a lion's head, suspended from a ribbon woven half-red and half blue, with green edges and narrow white stripes at the inner edge of the green . The medal was impressed in small capitals with the recipient's name on the reverse, and was awarded with a case of issue, miniature medal for wear, and an illuminated certificate.

== Recipients ==
A total of 34 awards of the Silver Cross of Rhodesia were made, three posthumously. Notable recipients included Martin Pearse, who was killed in Lusaka in 1979 during the attempted assassination by the Rhodesian SAS of the ZAPU insurgent leader Joshua Nkomo.

Robert C. MacKenzie was awarded the medal in 1979 for his role in commanding the Beira fuel depot attack.

Recipients were entitled to the post-nominal letters SCR.

== Zimbabwe ==
The Silver Cross of Rhodesia was superseded in October 1980 by the Silver Cross of Zimbabwe, which is also awarded for conspicuous bravery, but which is open for award to civilians as well as military personnel.
