= Rhodesian African Rifles =

Regiment of the Rhodesian Army

- The cap badge of the Rhodesian African Rifles, featuring a Matabele shield, crossed by a Matabele stabbing spear, obfuscated by a knobkerrie.
- Active: 1 May 1916 – 31 December 1981
- Country: Rhodesia, Zimbabwe from 1980 (Note: The name of the country equivalent to modern Zimbabwe changed numerous times during the history of the Rhodesian African Rifles. Following the independence of Northern Rhodesia as Zambia in 1964, the Southern Rhodesian government announced that it would drop "Southern" and henceforth call the country Rhodesia. Britain ruled this invalid. The colony issued the Unilateral Declaration of Independence as Rhodesia and used that name until becoming Zimbabwe Rhodesia in 1979; the UK continued to use Southern Rhodesia throughout this time. The name "Zimbabwe" was adopted on internationally recognised independence in April 1980.)
- Allegiance: United Kingdom (1940–65; also officially successors to the service of the RNR 1916–18); Rhodesia (1965–70); Republic of Rhodesia (1970–79); Zimbabwe Rhodesia (1979); United Kingdom (1979–80); Zimbabwe (1980–81)
- Branch: Regular Army
- Type: Infantry
- Size: 3 Battalions
- Garrison/HQ: Regimental Depot - Balla Balla; 1st Battalion - Bulawayo; 2nd Battalion - Fort Victoria; 3rd Battalion - Umtali
- Colours: Green and black
- March: "Sweet Banana"
- Mascot: "Private N'duna" the goat
- Engagements: World War II; Suez Crisis; Malayan Emergency; Nyasaland; Northern Rhodesia; Congo Border; Rhodesian Bush War

Commanders
- Ceremonial chief: Her Majesty the Queen

The Rhodesian African Rifles (RAR) was a regiment of the Rhodesian Army. The ranks of the RAR were recruited from the black African population, although officers were generally from the white population. The regiment was formed in May 1940 in the British colony of Southern Rhodesia.

The RAR were officially declared the successor to the Rhodesia Native Regiment (RNR) which had existed in World War I from 1916 to 1918, and was granted the RNR's battle honours earned fighting in the East African campaign. The RAR were the second-oldest regiment of the Rhodesian Army, after the Rhodesia Regiment which was raised in 1899.

The RAR used the "greens" uniform and wore slouch hats as headgear.

== History ==
After disbandment, selected members of the RNR formed the Askari Platoon of the British South Africa Police (BSAP) at Government House in Salisbury. Non-Commissioned Officers (NCOs) from this platoon provided the instructors when the RAR was formed in 1940 to fight in World War 2.

From 1940 to 1944, the RAR recruited and trained to battalion strength and developed its camp at Borrowdale near Salisbury. From 1944 to 1945, the battalion fought against the Japanese as part of Field Marshal William Slim's 14th Army in Burma, after which the regiment returned to Southern Rhodesia.

They were deployed overseas twice more, to Egypt (1951 to 1952) in response to Egyptian pressure on the Suez Canal. and to Malaya (1956 to 1958) during the Malayan Emergency.

The RAR's Queen's colour

Between these external deployments, the RAR provided security to Air Force bases within Southern Rhodesia. During that period Queen Elizabeth the Queen Mother, presented the colours to the regiment at a parade at the Borrowdale Camp (1953) and the regiment moved to a permanent barracks, at Heany (later renamed Methuen) on the outskirts of Bulawayo (1954).

After their return from Malaya in 1958, the RAR began to undertake 'duties in aid of the civil power' in response to civil unrest occurring in Salisbury, Bulawayo and Wankie, and in Northern Rhodesia. By 1961, these duties had extended to internal security operations in Northern Rhodesia including deployment along the Congolese/Northern Rhodesia border to prevent fighting spilling over from the Katangese secessionist war. After the Central African Federation was dissolved in 1962, to be replaced by the separate nations of Rhodesia, Zambia and Malawi, the RAR was returned to the sole command of the Rhodesian Army.

With the Rhodesian Unilateral Declaration of Independence from Britain, on 11 November 1965, members of the military wings of the Nationalist movement began an escalating series of incursions into Rhodesia with the aim of subverting the local population and overthrowing the government. This was known as Chimurenga (Liberation War).

The RAR fought throughout what came to be known as the 'Rhodesian Bush War' until the Ceasefire of February 1980. In the course of this conflict, the regiment grew from one to three battalions, established a regimental training depot and expanded further to incorporate the Independent Companies of the Rhodesia Regiment. Every African Soldier was a volunteer.

In February 1980 Zimbabwe African National Union, the political party now led by Robert Mugabe, renamed ZANU (PF) for 'Popular Front', won the first universal franchise General Election and came to power, renaming the country Zimbabwe. Incorporated into the Zimbabwe National Army but retaining its regimental identity, the RAR fought one last decisive battle, at Entumbane near Bulawayo in 1981, when they totally defeated a major ZIPRA uprising. By April 1981, the name 'RAR', together with its insignia, had been replaced by the numerical nomenclature and Staff Corps badges of the Zimbabwe Army.

=== The Rhodesia Native Regiment ===
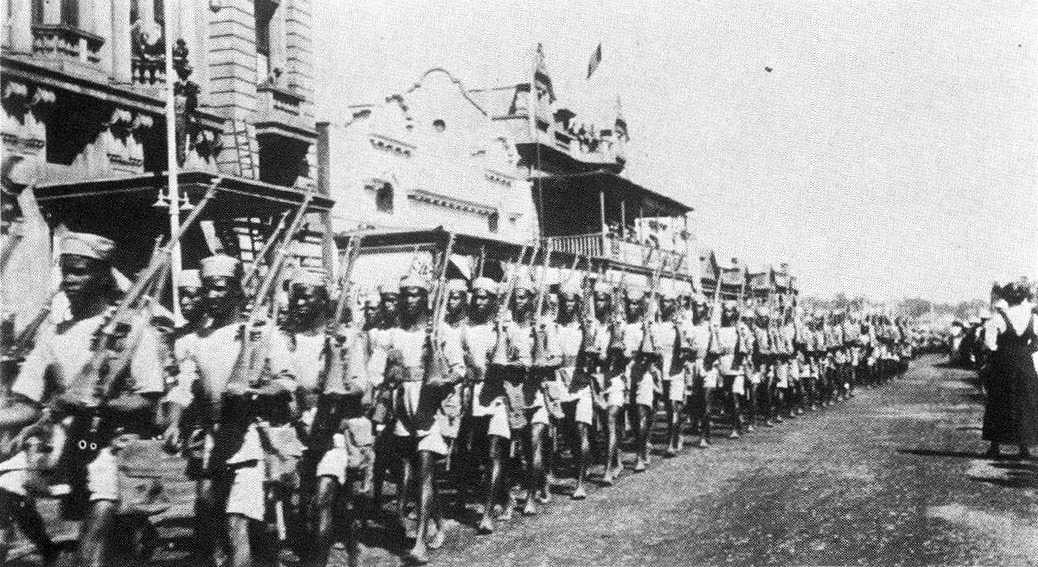
Rhodesia Native Regiment parading in Salisbury, 1916.

At the outbreak of World War 1, the commander of the German forces in German East Africa (Tanganyika) Colonel Paul von Lettow-Vorbeck recognised that he could best support the German war effort, not by defending the colony, but by operating in such a way that the Allies were forced to commit troops against him. Operating in highly mobile commando-type units, his forces operated across East Africa and threatened both Portuguese Mozambique and Northern Rhodesia.

To help counter this threat, the 1st Battalion of the RNR was formed on 1 May 1916. In July, the 450-strong battalion was sent to Zomba for further training but, because the operational situation had changed, were instead deployed into a German area north of Lake Nyasa. At Weidhaven, between 10 and 25 November 1916, the RNR (less one company that had been detached to go to Buhora) were attacked by two separate German forces, both of which they defeated.

The General Officer Commanding British Forces in East Africa, General Jan Smuts, said: "The conduct of this newly raised regiment, put into the firing line earlier than was intended through force of circumstance, reflects the greatest credit on those responsible for their short training, and on all ranks of the regiment."

Meanwhile, the company that had been sent to Buhora had also seen action. While following the rear-guard of a German column, the enemy walked into Rhodesian forces deployed across his front and both flanks. The RNR closed the northern perimeter and, by the morning of 25 November, the enemy found himself totally boxed in. By the next day, the German force had surrendered and were taken to Njombe en route to captivity (along with 300 head of cattle, the fate of which is predictably unknown).

Encounter battles with the German forces continued through 1917 with the troops marching an average of 31 miles a day in the harshest bush conditions, displaying extraordinary physical endurance.

In September 1917, a newly raised 2nd Battalion RNR entered the field and established a camp at Mbewa on the north-eastern shore of Lake Nyasa. On 28 January 1918, the two battalions joined forces as the 2nd Rhodesia Native Regiment. They were deployed to follow von Lettow's force, now reduced to 2,000 men, into Portuguese East Africa. On 22 May, they intercepted his supply column and captured it, and then continued the hide-and-seek pursuit of the main German force, marching an incredible 2,250 miles, until its eventual surrender in Northern Rhodesia on 25 November 1918, 14 days after the Armistice in Europe.

In December 1918, having lost 159 soldiers of all ranks killed in action or on active service, and 136 wounded, the RNR returned to Salisbury where it was disbanded. A select few were retained to form the Askari Platoon at Government House in Salisbury. When the RAR was awarded its colours in 1953, they inherited the battle honours of the RNR: 'The Great War' and 'East Africa 1916-1918'.

=== Formation of the RAR ===
In May 1940, the first commanding Officer of the RAR, Major FJ Wane ISO, a former RNR officer, received the following orders in his call-up papers: "There will be an African regiment; you will command it and the regiment will build its own camp on the Borrowdale road." African NCOs from the British South Africa Police (BSAP), together with African NCOs from the Askari Platoon, were selected to transfer to the new regiment and begin the task of training the recruits. An advertisement was placed for recruits and, soon, two companies were formed and engaged in basic drill and weapons training in the mornings and building their camp in the afternoons.

On 19 July 1940, by government notice GN 374/1940, the regiment was charged 'with the defence of the colony, the maintenance of order, and such duties as the minister may define' and, significantly, 'the regiment may be employed outside the colony'. Submissions were invited for the design of a badge and the final selection, issued in August 1940, depicted a Matabele war shield, crossed by a Matabele assegai (stabbing spear) and a Shona museve (digging spear), upon which was laid a vertical knobkierie. A scroll bearing the title 'Rhodesian African Rifles' was placed below the design.

On 20 September 1940, the battalion's first Regimental Sergeant Major was appointed. RSM Lechenda had first seen service as a bugler, aged ten, in the King's African Rifles in Somaliland. During World War I, as a Company sergeant major, he had been awarded the Distinguished Conduct Medal for leading a platoon against a German force that had been harassing a British position and driving them off. He earned the Military Medal when, with a hastily gathered group of 12 men, he attacked a German force (including three machine guns) that was about to seize a rations dump. He captured one machine gun and, in a follow-up, killed nine Germans.

Through 1940 to 1943, the battalion continued to recruit, train, and expand to full strength. During 1942, troops were sent to the South African city of Durban to escort Italian prisoners of war. It was there that the Regimental song Sweet Banana first began and, although it would evolve significantly, it would retain its chorus of 'I will buy you a sweet banana', influenced by the abundance of the fruit in Natal.

=== Burma ===
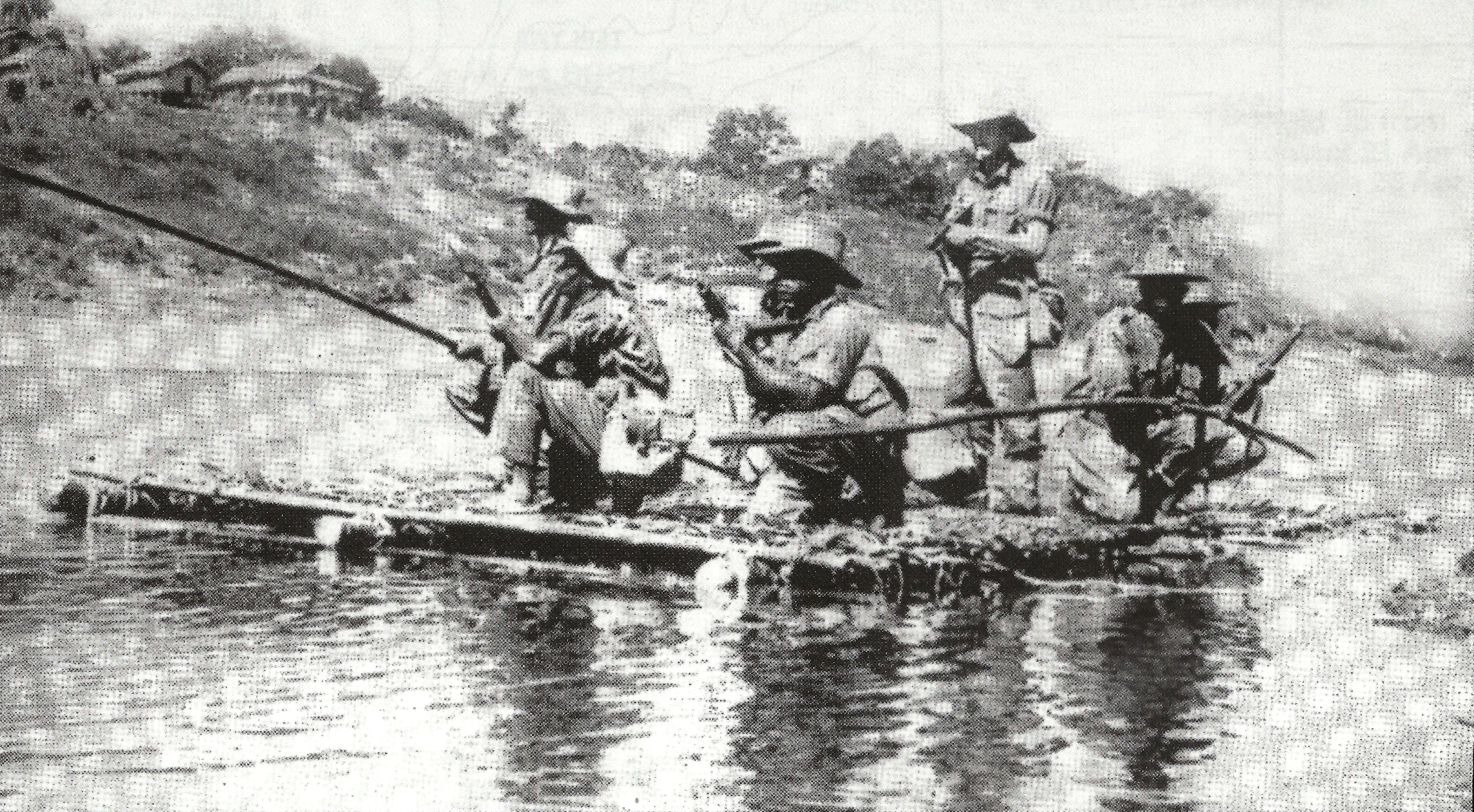
RAR troops campaigning in Burma during World War II.

On 17 November 1943, the RAR left Salisbury for Kenya to join the 26th East Africa Brigade. Training continued until 5 September 1944, when they entrained for Mombasa to board HMT Strathnaver and set sail for Ceylon. After acclimatisation and orientation to living, moving and fighting in the jungle, on 2 December they boarded HMT Aronda for Chittagong, in the Arakan, Burma. There, as part of the 22nd East African Infantry Brigade, they came under command the 15th Indian Corps, part of Field Marshal William Slim's 14th Army, fighting the Japanese.

The RAR were to face a formidable enemy. Of the Japanese, Field Marshall Slim wrote: "The strength of the Japanese Army lay… in the spirit of the individual Japanese soldier. He fought and marched till he died. If 500 Japanese were ordered to hold a position, we had to kill 495 before it was ours – and then the last five killed themselves. It was this combination of obedience and ferocity that made the Japanese army, whatever its condition, so formidable…"

At this stage of the War, the Japanese advance towards India had been halted and they were withdrawing through Burma. The RAR formed part of this pursuit, advancing through the jungle and making sporadic contact with the enemy.

In April 1945, the East Africa Brigade was serving under command the 82nd West African Division which had been tasked with clearing the Taungup area of Japanese. After the brigade had occupied the town of Palawa, the RAR battalion was given the lead and, on 15 April, they advanced towards an enemy position on a hill beyond Dalet, following the south bank of the Tanlwe Chaung. They soon closed with the Japanese and, over the next ten days, fought them in a series of encounter actions in the jungle that culminated on 26 April with a deliberate attack by A and D companies on two dug-in hill features code-named Bergner and Valerie. Both enemy positions were successfully taken, at a cost of seven Askari killed and one officer and twenty-two Askari wounded. On 27 April, C Company assisted 1KAR in an assault on another feature, code-named Abbott, occupied after the enemy withdrew that night.

The brigade continued the advance, now following Taungup Chaung and the RAR battalion took the lead again on 2 May. Crossing Taungup Chaung, D Company came under effective enemy fire from a feature code-named Powell. On the morning of 4 May, B and C companies advanced on Powell, beginning an engagement that would last until 7 May, at a cost of six Askari killed, until the brigade was ordered to bypass the feature and move to the Taungup-Prome road. Encounter actions with small groups of Japanese continued until the formal surrender of Japan on 17 July 1945. Afterwards, engagements continued sporadically against 'no-surrender groups'.

In March 1946, the battalion began its long journey homewards, returning to Salisbury on 10 May. The RAR was represented at the Victory Parade in London on 8 June 1946 and the band at the foot of the dais struck up Sweet Banana as the RAR contingent approached.

=== Egypt ===
By the end of 1946, the battalion comprised 1,300 men distributed between a depot and one guard company in Salisbury and the remaining companies in varying strengths guarding RhAF stations at Heany, Kumalo and Thornhill, a task they were to carry out for several years.

On 28 November 1951, the RAR were called upon to serve in Egypt to assist the British Army in the Suez Canal Zone. There, they were deployed to work with the Royal Engineers in construction projects and to guard three bases: Longbeach, El Kirsch and Port Said, mostly against the efforts of local thieves in their persistent efforts to burgle the camps. The RAR soldiers put their tracking skills to good use and earned a reputation for locating the culprits by following their spoor. During the time they were there, the record states that they killed two thieves, wounded three and captured twenty-five, along with eleven getaway bicycles.

While in Egypt, the men were told that their CO was returning from home leave via the Suez Canal. Permission was given for every available man to be transported to the bank of the Canal at the Farouk Cut. When the Durban Castle sailed past, the CO took the salute from its bridge as their stirring choruses of Sweet Banana filled the air.

When the Suez situation was resolved, the RAR returned to Southern Rhodesia, arriving at Salisbury Railway Station on 10 December 1952.

=== The Colours ===
On 12 July 1953, Queen Elizabeth the Queen Mother, presented the Colours to the regiment at a parade in Borrowdale attended by over 10,000 people. The design of the Colours was: 'on a bottle green flag, the regimental badge in colour, within a garter inscribed "The Rhodesian African Rifles", surrounded by a wreath of normal army pattern and surmounted by a crown.'

In due course, the Colours would be inscribed with the battle honours of the RAR's predecessor, the RNR: 'The Great War' and 'East Africa 1916-1918', together with those earned by the RAR in the Second World War: 'Burma 1944-45', 'Arakan Beaches' and 'Taungup'. The final battle honour, 'Rhodesia 1965-80' would one day be added to them.

On 25 April 1954, a date designated to be the Regimental Day, 'Tanlwe Chaung Day', the regiment performed the first ever 'Trooping of the Colour' in Southern Rhodesia before the Governor-General, Lord Llewellin.

=== Malaya ===
During the Japanese occupation of Malaya, the Malayan communists under the banner of the Malayan Peoples' Anti-Japanese Army (MPAJA) allied themselves with the British, who armed and trained them. After the war, the Malayan Communist Party, and their armed wing the Malayan National Liberation Army, began an insurgency against British colonial rule, in an event known as the Malayan Emergency. Rhodesian involvement in the Malayan Emergency began in 1951 with a two-year deployment of a 100-man South East Asia Volunteer Unit.

On 13 February 1956, an RAR advance party flew to Malaya to begin training and orientation with 1st Northern Rhodesia Regiment, who the RAR were to relieve, and 1 Fiji Infantry Regiment. While this took place, the battalion embarked on HMT Empire Clyde at Beira, arriving at Singapore on 26 April. From there they moved to the Far East Land Forces Training Centre in Johore where they came under command 99 Gurkha Infantry Brigade and were orientated by the advance party including, for the first time, training with helicopters.

Deployed in June and operating from platoon 'bases', sections sought to engage the MNLA guerrillas in the jungle, employing fighting patrols, long and short-term ambush operations, following tracks when located, and gaining limited kills in fleeting contacts. It was the type of warfare that did not yield many kills for any of the units operating in Malaya but the intensive patrolling maintained constant pressure on the enemy and, together with the granting of Malayan Independence in August 1957, led many MNLA guerrillas to surrender, and the eventual end of the 'Emergency'. Early in February 1958, the battalion completed its two-year tour of duty and moved to Nee Soon transit camp in Singapore. They returned via Beira and Umtali to Bulawayo, to find their barracks much-improved in their absence and renamed Methuen Camp after their honorary colonel.

=== Rhodesia ===
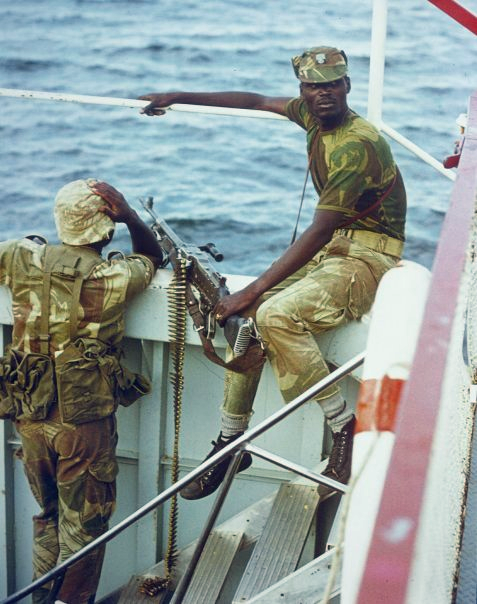
Two RAR personnel manning a patrol boat on Lake Kariba, 1976.

Returning to Southern Rhodesia meant a return to training and to 'duties in aid of the civil power': control of civil unrest, often in the form of riot control in support of the BSAP. At the end of 1963, the Central African Federation broke up to be replaced by the separate nations of Rhodesia, Zambia and Malawi. The RAR came under sole command of the Rhodesian Army and its deployments were mostly made along its Zambezi Valley border in response to the first nationalist rumblings emanating from countries to the north.

By the time of Rhodesia's Unilateral Declaration of Independence (UDI) from Britain, on 11 November 1965, the African nationalist movement as it affected Rhodesia had split into two factions. The Zimbabwe African National Union (ZANU) was mainly Shona, led initially by Ndabaningi Sithole but ultimately by Robert Mugabe, supported by China and with a military wing known later as the Zimbabwe African National Liberation Army (ZANLA). The Zimbabwe African People's Union (ZAPU) was mainly Ndebele, led by Joshua Nkomo, supported by the Soviet Union and its military wing was the Zimbabwe People's Revolutionary Army (ZIPRA). Beginning in 1966, members of these guerrilla armies, known (as in Malaya) as CTs, began an escalating series of incursions into Rhodesia with the aim of subverting the local population and overthrowing the government. This was known as Chimurenga (Liberation War).

The Rhodesian Security Forces' response was to establish a Joint Operational Command (JOC) system incorporating elements of the Army, BSAP, Air Force, Internal Affairs and other relevant services and to define each separate incursion as a named 'Operation' that concluded when the insurgents in the group were all accounted for. Later, the country was divided into geographical, named Operational Areas each with its own JOC and sub-JOCs. The RAR was deployed under this system throughout what came to be known as the 'Bush War' until the Ceasefire of February 1980.

During this time, the regiment expanded from one to three battalions, with 1RAR remaining near Bulawayo, 2RAR established near Fort Victoria in 1975 and 3RAR near Umtali in 1979. Shaw Barracks, a regimental training depot, was established at Balla Balla and the Independent Companies of the Rhodesia Regiment were incorporated into the RAR.

This was a Counter Insurgency (COIN) war, to be fought with the people, not against them. As members of the African community, the African Soldiers (AS) (the term Askari was dropped during the 1960s) were very adept at interacting with the local people, both in direct contact with them on patrol and by observing the signs of village life from an Observation Post (OP).

The RAR, as an infantry regiment, employed infantry COIN tactics against its enemy: patrols, ambushing, OPs, cordon and searches of habitation, attacks on located guerrilla camps or hides, tracking and follow-up. These tactics were used both internally in Rhodesia and externally in Zambia and Mozambique. As with all professional units, and in collaboration with other Rhodesian Security Force services, these were refined and evolved. The evolution of the Fireforce concept was the most significant example of that.

Covert OPs of tribal areas were an effective tactic for sighting CT groups but the challenge lay in concentrating force onto the sighting sufficiently rapidly to destroy them. In conjunction with the Air Force, the Army had, by 1974, developed Fireforce as a response to this. Fireforce involved the vertical envelopment of an enemy group by troops deployed from helicopters and (from 1976 onwards) by parachute, supported by air-to-ground fire from helicopters and fixed wing aircraft. Combined with OPs, who located and talked the Fire Force onto targets, they would prove the most effective tactic of the Bush War. The Rhodesian Light Infantry (RLI) and the RAR provided most of the Fireforce troops. Within an RAR battalion, of the five companies, the pattern was very frequently for one company to be on Fireforce, three on OPs/ambushes looking for targets and one on R&R at any one time.

Many hundreds of soldiers were killed or captured by the RAR during the Bush War in Rhodesia but not without loss. Between 1967 and 1980 the regiment lost over 200 soldiers killed in action, killed on active service or assassinated in their homes by guerrillas and supporters of the nationalist cause.

The seeming paradox that thousands of black soldiers volunteered for and served in the Rhodesian Army during the UDI period has been noted by scholars. Some have argued that these troops, who fought steadfastly and effectively, were motivated by loyalty to their comrades and regiments, alongside a strong sense of military professionalism.

=== Zimbabwe ===
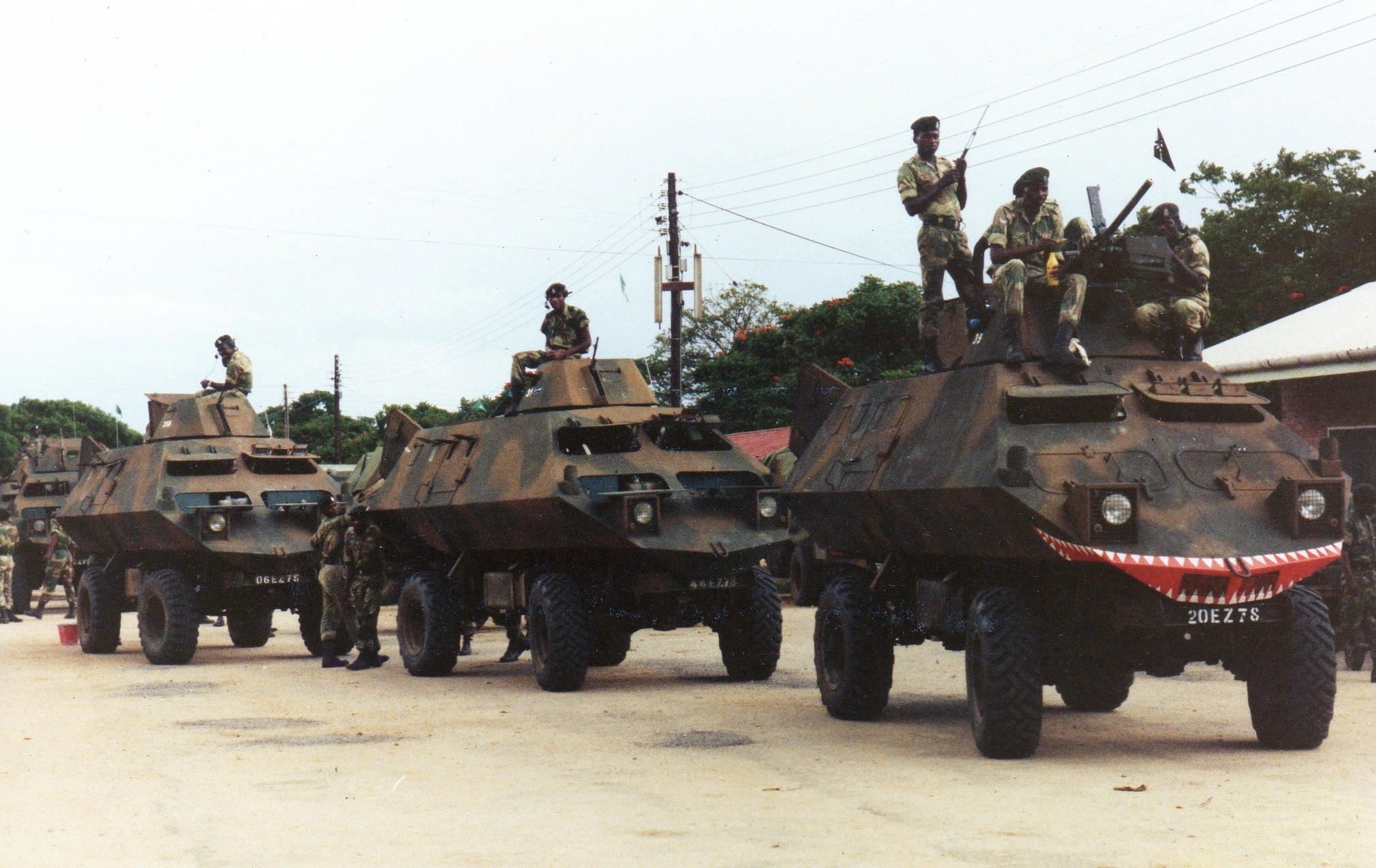
1RAR troops atop MPCV vehicles in 1980.

The results of the 1980 Southern Rhodesian general election were announced on 4 March 1980, giving victory to Robert Mugabe and ZANU (PF), the successor to ZANU. The Army began a process of reorganisation with the aim of incorporating the former-Rhodesian Army, ZIPRA and ZANLA into a new Zimbabwe National Army.

In November 1980 1RAR assisted in quelling major clashes between ZANLA and ZIPRA in the Entumbane Township near Bulawayo and, in February 1981, 1RAR (supported by four Eland armoured cars from the former Rhodesian Armoured Corps and a single Lynx aircraft) defeated the 1st ZIPRA Mechanised Brigade supported by T-34 tanks and BTR-152 armoured personnel carriers during the 1981 Entumbane Uprising. This was a decisive victory that took away ZIPRA's military advantage over ZANLA and, ironically, cemented Mugabe's hold on power.

Progressively through this period, the regimental identity of the RAR battalions was removed and they were required to adopt numerical nomenclature and Staff Corps insignia, ending the regiment, with its predecessor the RNR, after 65 years of being.

== Organisation ==
The establishment for each of the three regular battalions of the RAR was four rifle companies and a support company comprising an 81 mm mortar platoon, a 60 mm mortar platoon, an anti-tank platoon equipped with 106 mm recoil-less rifles, a reconnaissance (tracker) platoon and an assault pioneer platoon.

=== Weapons ===
By the time of the Rhodesian Bush War, the standard weapon of the RAR soldier was the FN (Fabrique Nationale) FAL, a Belgian-made 7.62mm assault rifle and the FN MAG, a 7.62 mm general-purpose machine gun also manufactured by FN in Belgium.

== Notable members ==
- Lieutenant Charlie Aust, later the last commanding officer of the Rhodesian Light Infantry
- WO1 E. Kampion, bandmaster of the RAR Regimental Band and holder of the Defence Force Medal for Meritorious Service.
- Lieutenant-Colonel George Holland Hartley
- Lieutenant Ron Marillier, a commander in the RAR during Operation Cauldron.
- Captain Ken MacDonald, the Rhodesian African Rifles bandmaster and composer of Rise, O Voices of Rhodesia (the Rhodesian anthem).
- Jairos Jiri, the initiator of the Zimbabwean disability movement

== Sources ==
- Abbott, Peter; Botham, Philip (June 1986). Modern African Wars: Rhodesia, 1965–80. Osprey Publishing. ISBN 978-0-85045-728-5.
- Binda, Alexandre (2007a). Masodja: The History of the Rhodesian African Rifles and Its Forerunner the Rhodesia Native Regiment. 30° South Publishers. ISBN 978-1-920143-03-9.
- Binda, Alexandre (2007b). The Saints: The Rhodesian Light Infantry. 30° South. ISBN 9781920143077.
- Buch, Esteban (May 2004) [1999]. Beethoven's Ninth: A Political History. Translated by Miller, Richard. Chicago, Illinois: University of Chicago Press. ISBN 978-0-226-07824-3.
- Howard, M. T. (2024). Black Soldiers in the Rhodesian Army: Colonialism, Professionalism, and Race. Cambridge University Press. ISBN 978-1-009-34842-3.
- Maclaren, I. P., ed. (1982). More Rhodesian Senior Schools, Part Two, 1950–1982. Books of Zimbabwe. ISBN 0-86920-260-X.
- McLaughlin, Peter (1980). Ragtime Soldiers: The Rhodesian Experience in the First World War. Books of Zimbabwe. ISBN 978-0-86920-234-0.
- Otter, Ken (30 May 2017). HMS Gloucester. Pen & Sword Books Limited. ISBN 9781526714039.
- Palley, Claire (1966). The Constitutional History and Law of Southern Rhodesia 1888–1965, With Special Reference to Imperial Control. Clarendon Press. ASIN B0000CMYXJ.
- Rasmussen, Kent; Rubert, Steven C. (2001) [1990]. A Historical Dictionary of Zimbabwe (3 ed.). Scarecrow Press. ISBN 978-0-8108-3471-2.
- Slim, William (2007) [1956]. Defeat in to Victory. Cassel & Co Ltd.
- Smith, Ian (June 1997). The Great Betrayal: The Memoirs of Ian Douglas Smith. John Blake Publishing. ISBN 1-85782-176-9.
- Wessels, Hannes (July 2010). P. K. van der Byl: African Statesman. Johannesburg: 30° South Publishers. ISBN 978-1-920143-49-7.
