= Rungu =

Rungu may refer to:

- Rungu (Borneo ethnic group), of Borneo in the South China Sea
- Rungu (African ethnic group), of Zambia and Tanzania in Africa
- Rungu (weapon), a traditional throwing stick or cudgel of East Africa
