= Sweet Banana =

Rhodesian song and military march

Song
- Written: 1942
- Composer: Rhodesian African Rifles

"Sweet Banana" is a Rhodesian song and military march. It was created in 1942 and was used as the regimental march of the Rhodesian African Rifles (RAR). It later gained subsequent popularity with the Rhodesian civilian population.

== History ==
Though it is not known who created "Sweet Banana", it is known it was created around 1942 during the Second World War. It reportedly came about after Rhodesian African Rifles soldiers were escorting Italian prisoners of war off a boat in Durban, Natal Province, Union of South Africa. Due to the large amount of bananas being sold there, the soldiers stopped to buy some and composed a march about it. Upon the end of the war, the RAR were located in Egypt and when they were told their Commanding Officer was returning via the Suez Canal, the soldiers lined the banks to salute him and sang him in to "Sweet Banana". At the 1946 Victory Parade in London, the RAR represented Southern Rhodesia and the band played "Sweet Banana" as they approached the parade dais.

Traditionally when it was performed, the soldiers would sing as they marched. When the RAR was disbanded in 1981 following the establishment of Zimbabwe, "Sweet Banana" was performed for the last time as they marched through the streets of Bulawayo towards the ceremony where their colours were laid up. They had originally marched in silence and only performed it in response to hearing a young boy ask his father why the soldiers were not singing.

== Civilian use ==
Though meant as a military march, "Sweet Banana" was popular with the civilian population of Rhodesia. The singer John Edmond performed a commercial version of it which gained popularity. The song would retain popularity with the Rhodesian diaspora.
