= Battle of Tanlwe Chaung =

1945 Military engagement during the Burma campaign (WWII)

Coordinates: 18°28′07.0″N 94°23′37.5″E

The Battle of Tanlwe Chaung took place in Burma on 26 April 1945. It was fought between the British Army's 22nd East African Brigade, including the Rhodesian African Rifles (RAR), and forces of Imperial Japan. The battle resulted in the deaths of 14 RAR men and an unknown number of Japanese, with the RAR overrunning the Japanese and gaining vital ground.

== RAR Preparations ==
In March, the 22nd East African Brigade assisted the 4th Indian Infantry Brigade, in advancing south towards the town of Taungup. On 17 April, command of Taungup was handed over to the 22nd East African Brigade. The battalion was split into four companies, their HQ was established on 20 April 1945. It was protected by A company, the other three companies took up defensive positions around the Chaung.

== Battle Reconnaissance ==
At 1300 on 20 April, Japanese forces began to fire mortar and artillery rounds on the RAR positions, along with horrific rain. The morale of the RAR was weakened. Two reconnaissance patrols were sent to survey two features codenamed "Bergner" and "Valerie". The patrol from D company encountered Japanese light machine gun fire, confirming that both features were held by concealed Japanese.

On 24 April, three more RAR patrols were sent to pinpoint machine gun placements, one from each company. During which B company suffered their first fatality of the battle, after a heavy machine gun opened up on B Company's Bren gunner.

== The battle ==
On the morning of 26 April, two West African 4.7-inch howitzer batteries began to fire on Bergner and Valerie assisted by Hawker Hurricanes. A company's mortar platoon began to fire on Bergner. From their positions A and D company advanced on Bergner. Artillery fire was then focused on Valerie, which caused confusion among the Japanese. Soldiers dug in on Valerie abandoned their foxholes and went to the aid of their Japanese comrades on Bergner. At this point A company advanced catching the Japanese in open ground. The Japanese withdrew to the lower slopes.

A and D company then dug in on Valerie and Bergner. This allowed the HQ to be moved to the north of Bergner, giving the HQ a good view of the surrounding area.

That night the Japanese mortared the RAR's newly won positions and killed 3 men after hitting A company's trench. Japanese forces then attacked from the rear, causing unrest among the RAR soldiers and four men lost their lives through friendly fire.
