= Farmingdale Statue =

17th-century Zulu or Nguni wooden figure

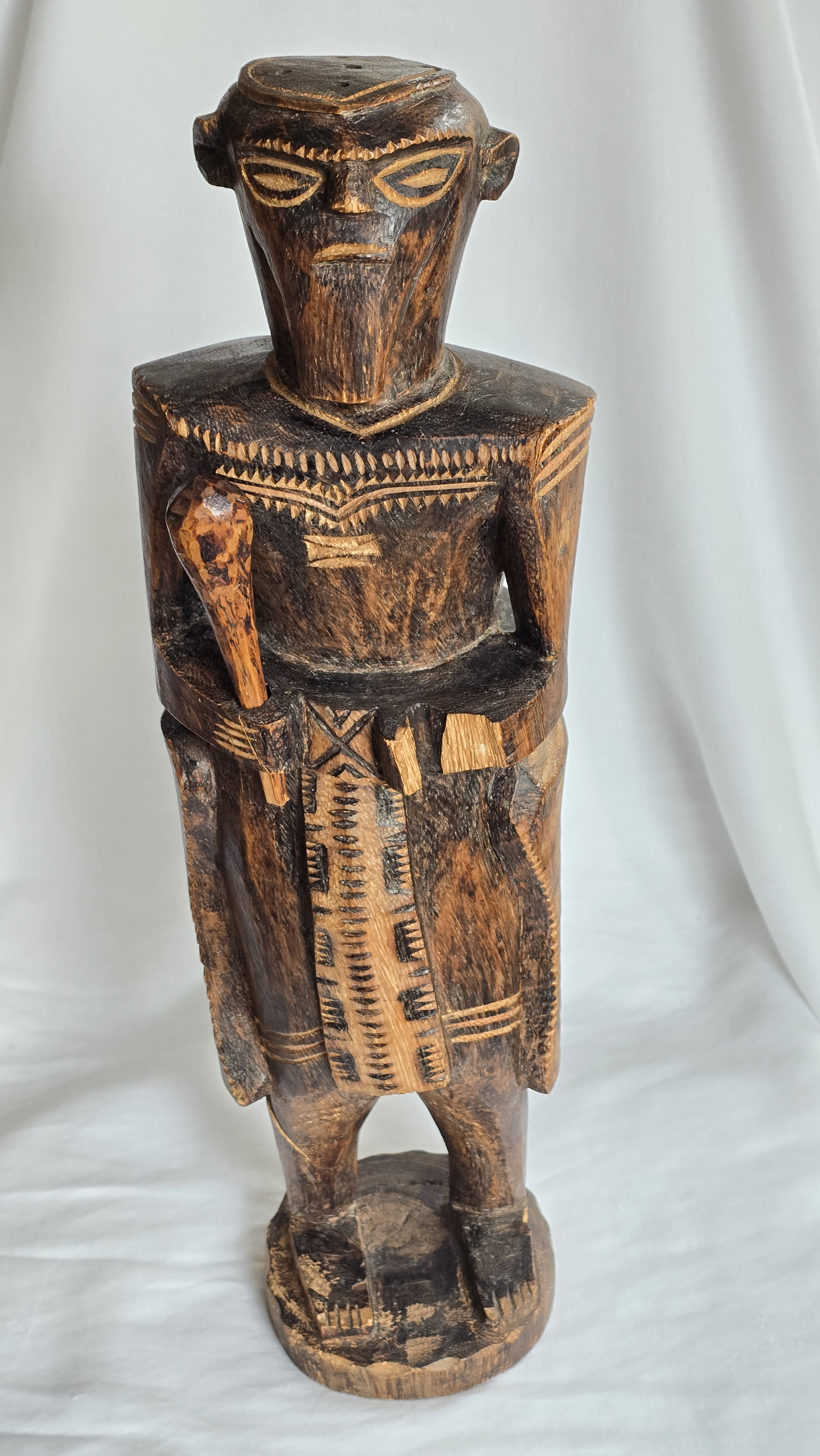
- Farmingdale Statue, front view. Zulu or Nguni wooden figure, c. A.D. 1630, found in South Farmingdale, Long Island, New York, 1961.
- Material: Cassia siamea wood
- Size: 51 cm height, 15 cm width (shoulders)
- Created: c. 1630 (radiocarbon dated)
- Discovered: September 1961
- Present location: Private collection, United States
- Culture: Zulu or Nguni, southeastern Africa

The Farmingdale Statue is a wooden anthropomorphic figure unearthed in September 1961 during excavation behind a private residence in Farmingdale, on the south shore of Long Island, New York. Radiocarbon dating of the wood established a date of around A.D. 1630, with a margin of error of 115 years, making it one of the oldest surviving wooden objects of African origin known to researchers. The statue was subsequently identified as the work of the Zulu or another Nguni group of southeastern Africa, and its presence on Long Island raises questions about early contact between southern Africa and colonial North America.

As of 1982 the artifact remained in private ownership by the family of the original finder, Edna Genega.

== Discovery ==
In September 1961, Edna Genega and her family were excavating behind their home in South Farmingdale, New York, when she discovered a dirt-encased wooden figure buried beneath a small tree rooted in swamp deposits. The swamp had been masked by clean sandy fill laid down before the construction of the surrounding ranch-style houses. The bog appeared to have drained into a small stream entering Great South Bay along the western shore of a peninsula known locally as Fort Neck. The find-spot was within a few kilometers of the former Massapequa tribal stronghold, whose fort had been destroyed in 1644 by English mercenaries in the employ of William Kieft, Director-General of New Netherlands.

A specialist in the study of primitive art at a major museum initially dismissed the find as a piece of modern tourist art. The statue eventually came to the attention of archaeologist Richard Michael Gramly, then at the State University of New York at Stony Brook, who undertook a systematic investigation.

Gramly visited the Genega home and cut a small block of wood from the statue's base for radiocarbon dating, filling the hole with paraffin to prevent further damage. He noted that the wood was soft and friable — a sure sign of respectable antiquity. He also excavated two pits near the find-spot with the assistance of the Genega family to verify the circumstances of discovery. Both pits revealed forty to sixty centimeters of barren fill resting upon swamp or bog deposit. The most significant item recovered was a chip of sawn wood bearing marks of an early straightsaw, suggesting the deposit dated to the seventeenth century or later.

== Physical description ==
The statue is a standing anthropomorphic male figure measuring 51 centimetres (20 in) in height, with a shoulder width of 15 centimetres (5.9 in). It is carved from a single piece of wood and is notable for its detailed surface decoration and the presence of several separately rendered accessories.

Key features include a circular head-ring (isicoco), worn among the Zulu by all mature men, with holes that may once have held plumes; a fur kaross appearing to have been fashioned from leopard skins; a hanging loincloth rendered in exquisite detail; and a detachable knobkerrie (club) held in the right hand. The left hand was broken and lost at the time of discovery, struck accidentally by a shovel, and may once have held a staff or spear. The figure bears a beard — significant because European observers shipwrecked on the Natal coast in the seventeenth century frequently noted that important men among the Nguni were bearded. Intricate designs incised on the shoulders, neck, and breast are interpreted as representations of decorative scarifications, marks considered beautiful among Nguni peoples.

The surface of the statue was coated with a veneer of clear, waxy matter identified by the chemistry department of the State University of New York at Stony Brook as animal fat or oil — consistent with traditional African practice of dressing wood carvings with fat to preserve the wood and impart a luster over time. Traces of red ochre or similar pigment remained in some of the incised grooves. Tool marks of a narrow-bladed adze, possibly a metal one, were evident on the base.

== Radiocarbon dating ==
Gramly submitted a wood sample from the statue's base to a radiocarbon dating laboratory. The wood was dated to A.D. 1630, with a margin of error of 115 years. The friability of the wood further confirmed that the carving had not been made recently. All evidence indicated that the Farmingdale statue was a genuine relic of the Colonial period.

== Expert identification ==
Gramly solicited evaluations from multiple specialists in primitive art and African ethnology, though initial responses were skeptical thanks to the exceptional state of preservation. Opinions on stylistic attribution varied widely. One curator of ethnology at a New England museum cautiously suggested a Middle Eastern or African origin. Specialists at a large Midwestern museum compared the iconography to excavated figures from ancient Nineveh, or alternatively proposed that it was a naive modern European portrayal of a prehistoric man. Experts at a Belgian museum argued the statue lacked the rounded surfaces characteristic of authentic African carvings.

A decisive identification came from Leon Siroto, an expert on traditional African wood carving, who at the time was assisting in the cataloguing of the Peabody Museum's collection of African art at Harvard University. Referred to Gramly by Monni Adams, Curator of Art and Anthropology, Siroto identified the work unhesitatingly as having been made by the Zulu or another Nguni group of southeastern Africa. The identifying clues were the head-ring, the detachable knobkerrie, the fur kaross appearing to have been sewn from leopard skins, the beard, and the decorative scarification designs on the shoulders and breast.

Patricia Davison, a professional officer at the South African Museum, confirmed Siroto's attribution, while expressing reservations about the statue's antiquity given the conditions under which it had been preserved.

== Wood identification ==
Gramly brought the statue to the Tropical Timber Information Center at the College of Environmental Science and Forestry at Syracuse University, where Carl de Zeeuw and Richard L. Gray identified the wood as belonging to the family Leguminosae, possibly the genera Cassia or Acacia. De Zeeuw subsequently provided a more specific classification, identifying the wood as Cassia siamea — an Asiatic tree first introduced into central and northern South Africa as a fast-growing windbreak whose wood is termite-resistant. He noted that among members of the Cassia genus in South Africa, only C. siamea produces stems broad enough to carve an artefact as large as the Farmingdale statue.

The identification of C. siamea had an important implication: the species was apparently introduced to South Africa no earlier than the first half of the seventeenth century, when Dutch skippers were making experimental plantings at the Cape of Good Hope. It was suggested that logs of C. siamea might have been salvaged by Nguni wood-carvers from one of the many shipwrecks on the Transkei and Natal coasts.

== Comparable artifacts ==
During the investigation, several other statues with strong similarities to the Farmingdale specimen were identified.

=== Sea Point statue, Cape Town (1977) ===
At the end of 1977, Patricia Davison reported the discovery of a comparable broken statue on the grounds of the Sea Point Clinic in Sea Point, Cape Town, which had been unearthed from what appeared to be an old refuse dump. Comparison of photographs showed the Cape Town statue shares the head-ring, kaross, and socketed knobkerrie with the Farmingdale specimen, though the club was missing from its socket. The finish and execution of the Farmingdale statue were judged superior, with finer detail in the scarification, kaross, and loincloth. The differences in quality and execution were taken to imply a significant difference in age between the two objects.

=== Transvaal statue (1978) ===
In May 1978, Davison encountered a third comparable figure while examining a privately owned collection of African art in the Transvaal. The owner had received it from a friend who purchased it in Zululand in the 1940s or 1950s and did not consider it a serious work of art, believing it had been made for the tourist trade. Despite its crudeness, the statue bears a basic similarity in form to the Farmingdale and Sea Point specimens.

=== Rijksmuseum voor Volkenkunde, Leiden ===
The Rijksmuseum voor Volkenkunde at Leiden was found to hold several wooden statues from southeastern Africa, all considered outstanding examples of traditional wood carving from the region. Three of them had been exhibited at the 1889 World's Fair in Paris as a contribution by the South African Republic, and an 1892 auction catalogue listed them as having been fashioned by the "Kaffir" in the Transvaal. While related in head shape and facial details to the Farmingdale and Sea Point statues, the Leiden statues belong to a different class of free-standing figures as they hold no weapons and their sex is shown.

== Provenance theories ==
The identification of the statue as a Zulu or Nguni artefact raised the central historical question of how it had arrived on Long Island in the seventeenth century. Gramly explored several hypotheses.

=== West African slave connection ===
If the carving had been traceable to West Africa — the origin of most enslaved people brought to colonial Long Island — an enslaved individual might have transported it. However, the statue's southeastern African attribution made this explanation inapplicable.

=== Massapequa tribal connection ===
The statue was found within a few kilometers of the Massapequa tribal stronghold, whose fort had been destroyed in 1644 — a date close to the radiocarbon date of the statue. Gramly proposed that the statue may have belonged to a member of the Massapequa tribe, who received it as a curiosity or trade item from a European or African contact. As a symbol of a completely foreign culture, the meaning of the artefact likely died with its owner, and the carving was eventually discarded and buried in the swamp.

=== Dutch West India Company connection ===
Gramly considered the possibility that the statue's original owner — a Nguni person from southeastern Africa — had been captured by Dutch forces and pressed into service with the Dutch West India Company, eventually arriving in New Amsterdam (now New York). Between 1600 and 1650, Dutch men-of-war posed a serious threat to Portuguese shipping in the Indian Ocean. A Dutch fleet laid siege to the island of Mozambique, Portugal's principal southeastern African port, in 1607. It was common Dutch practice to hold officers and wealthy passengers for ransom and sell crew members into bondage.

A specific case that attracted Gramly's attention was the Nossa Senhora da Belem, a Portuguese vessel that ran aground at the Umzimkulu River on the southern Natal coast in July 1635. Survivors constructed two new vessels — the Natividade and the Boa Viagem — from salvaged timber, during which time they cultivated the friendship of local Nguni groups. The Boa Viagem was never heard from again after departing in January 1636. The diary of a commander of a large Dutch fleet confirms arrival at Table Bay in March 1636, suggesting the Dutch fleet likely intercepted the Boa Viagem. Gramly speculated that a Nguni individual may have subsequently ended up in Dutch colonial service in New Amsterdam, bringing the statue with him.

Gramly acknowledged that this explanation remained circumstantial, and that the full story of how the statue came to be buried in a Long Island swamp may never be known.

== Museum exhibition (1981) ==
In 1981, the Farmingdale Statue was loaned by Edna Genega to the Buffalo Museum of Science, where it was exhibited as catalogue item No. 83, titled "Wooden Statue", in the exhibition "Masterpieces of the Anthropology Collection", which opened on May 3, 1981. The exhibition catalogue described the statue as one of the earliest artifacts associable with Black Americans of African descent, referenced the identification of the wood as Cassia siamea, with a carbon-14 age of 320 radiocarbon years, and hypothesized that the figure had been brought to New Amsterdam by an indentured African laboring for the Dutch West India Company. The catalogue confirmed the statue's dimensions as 51 cm in height and 15 cm in width at the shoulders.

Prior to the exhibition opening, an article published in The Buffalo News on February 15, 1981 previewed the exhibition and credited Leon Siroto as the expert who provided the decisive identification.

The Farmingdale Statue also served as the lead artifact in the Buffalo Courier-Express Sunday section's feature article on the exhibition, published on May 3, 1981, which characterized it as "one of the oldest such artifacts ever found in North America".

Following the exhibition, journalist Tony Schaeffer reported in Newsday on September 23, 1982 that Edna Genega was actively seeking a suitable permanent exhibition venue on Long Island.

The statue remains in the private possession of the Genega family.

== Significance ==
Gramly assessed the potential importance of the Farmingdale Statue on multiple grounds. Artefacts of the Colonial period attributable to Black Americans are rare, and objects that came from Africa to the New World in the hands of their original owners are doubly so. The statue is one of the oldest surviving African wood carvings, as well as a representative of a little-known school of wood-carving art — the Zulu had not previously been given credit as wood-carvers, and comparative material was extremely rare. As a relic of the encounter between an Old World population and Native Americans, the statue may be unique, serving as a reminder of seventeenth-century America.

== Gallery ==
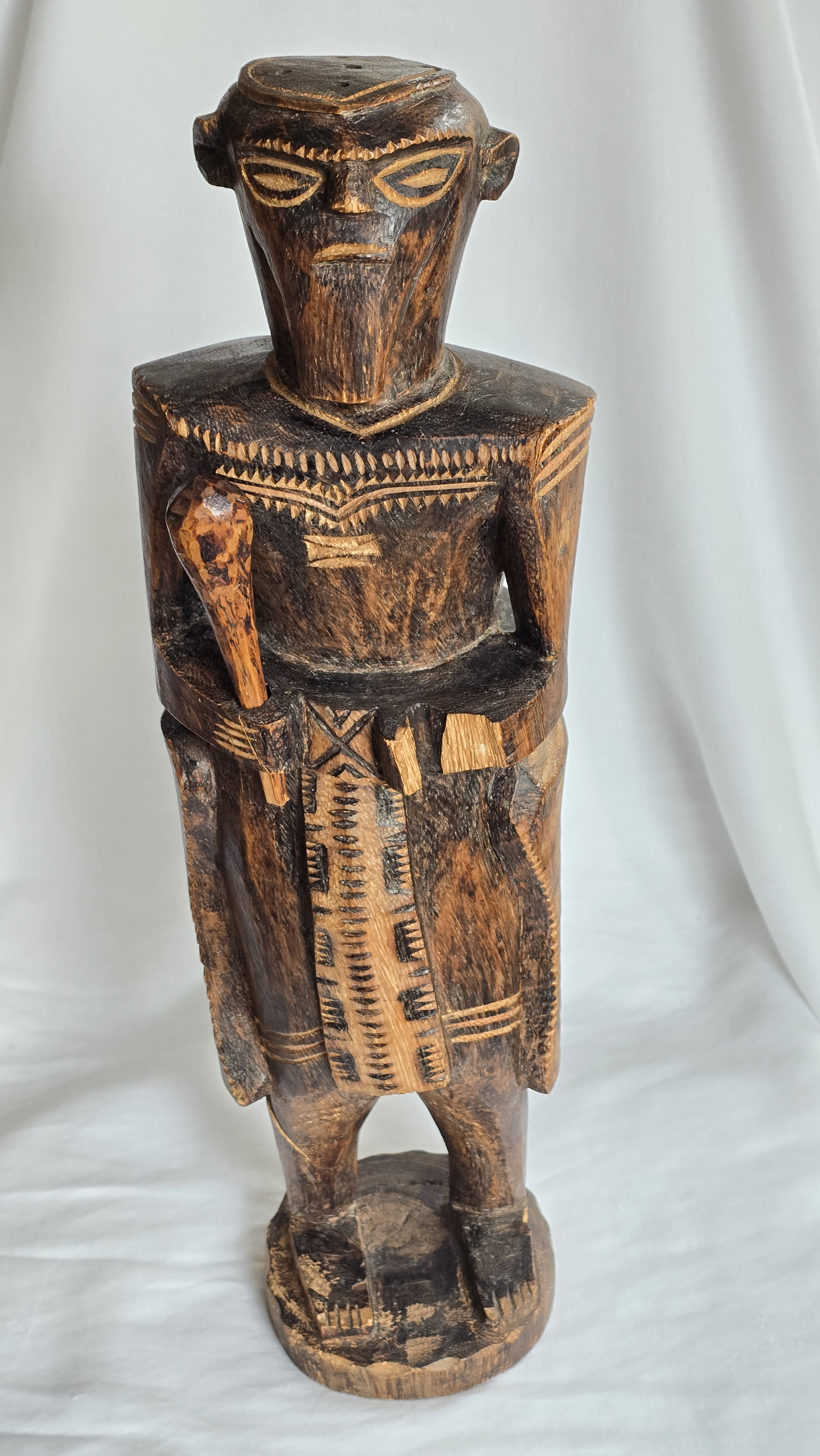
Front view

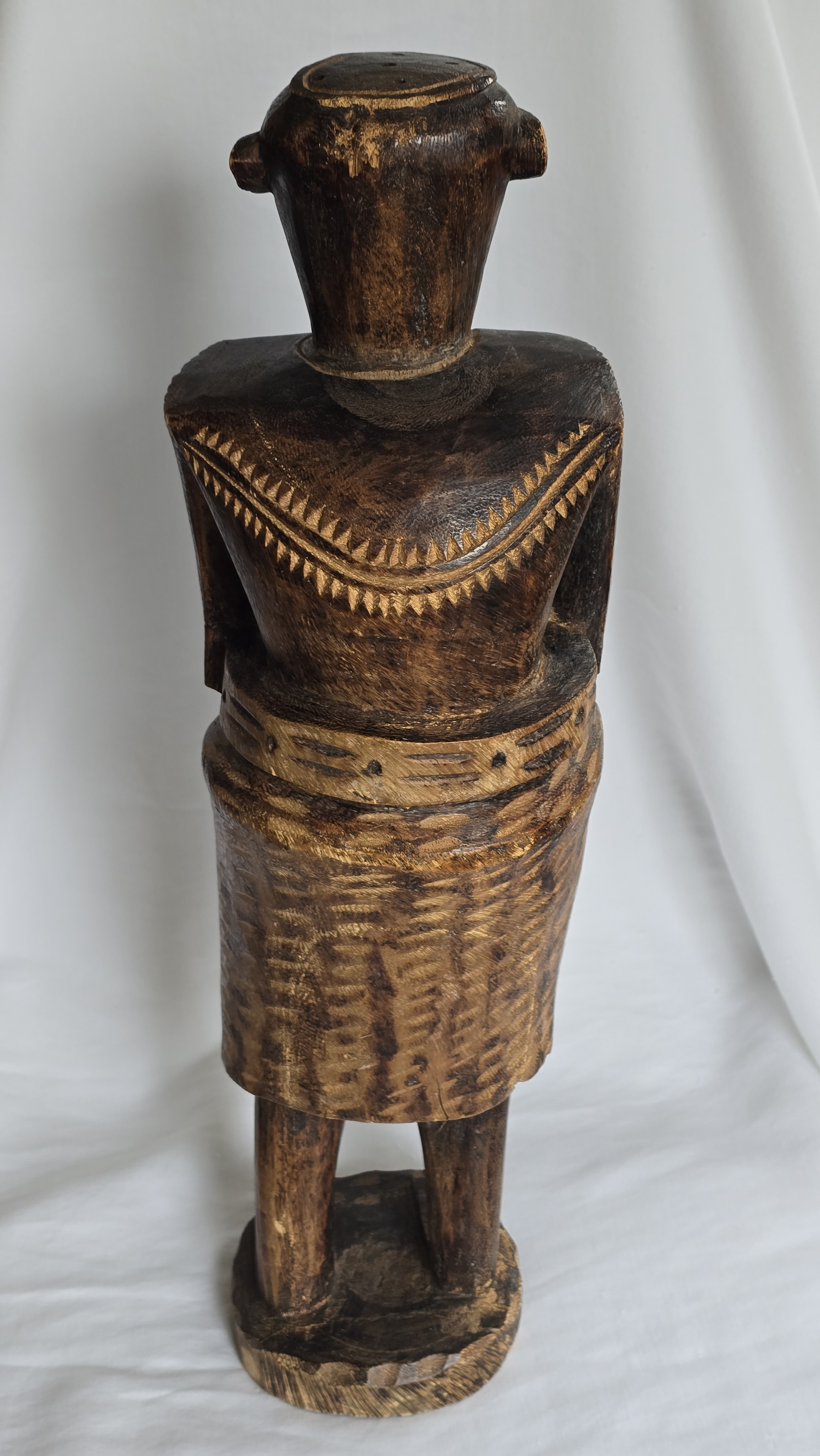
Rear view

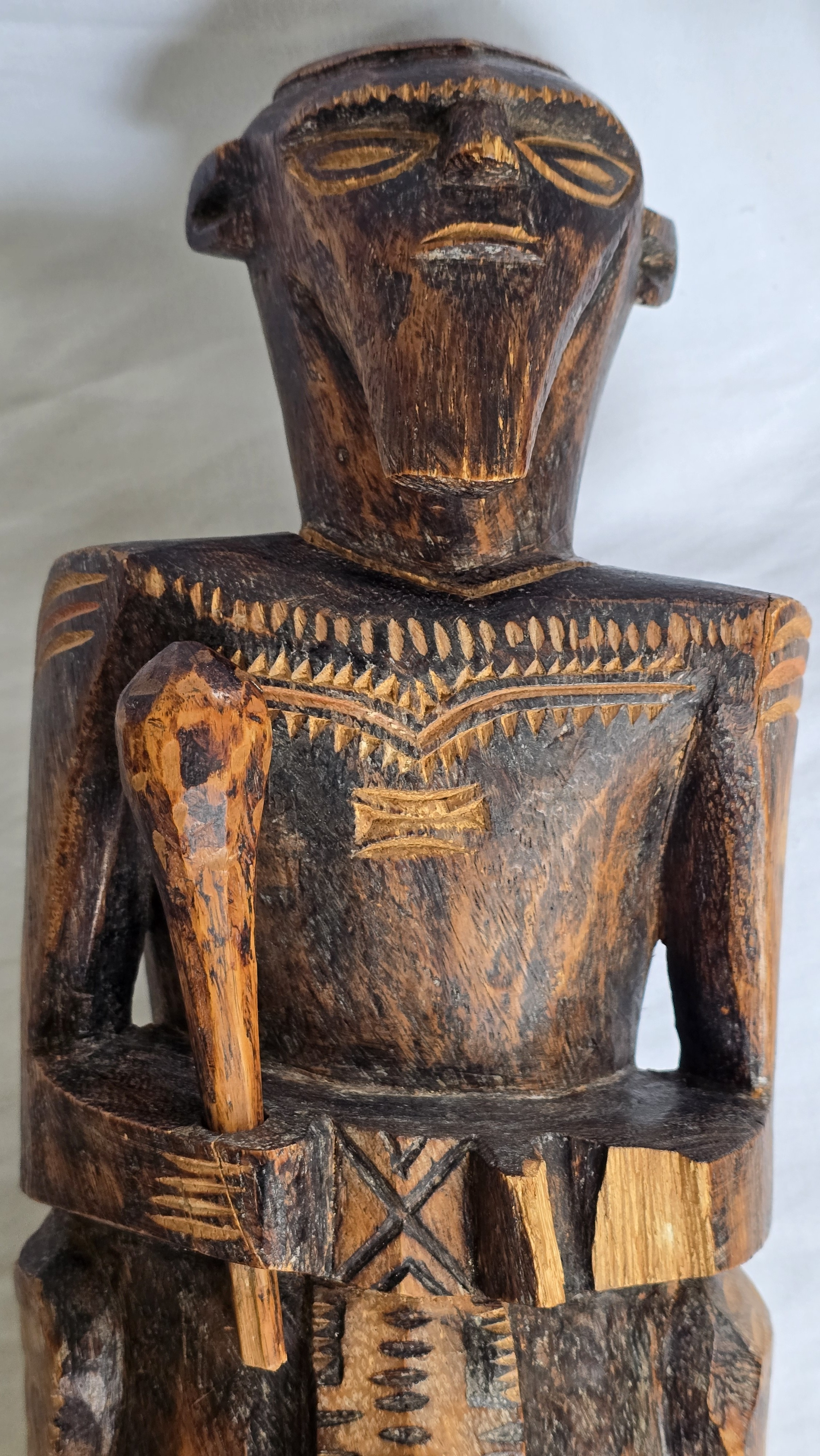
Face and upper torso detail

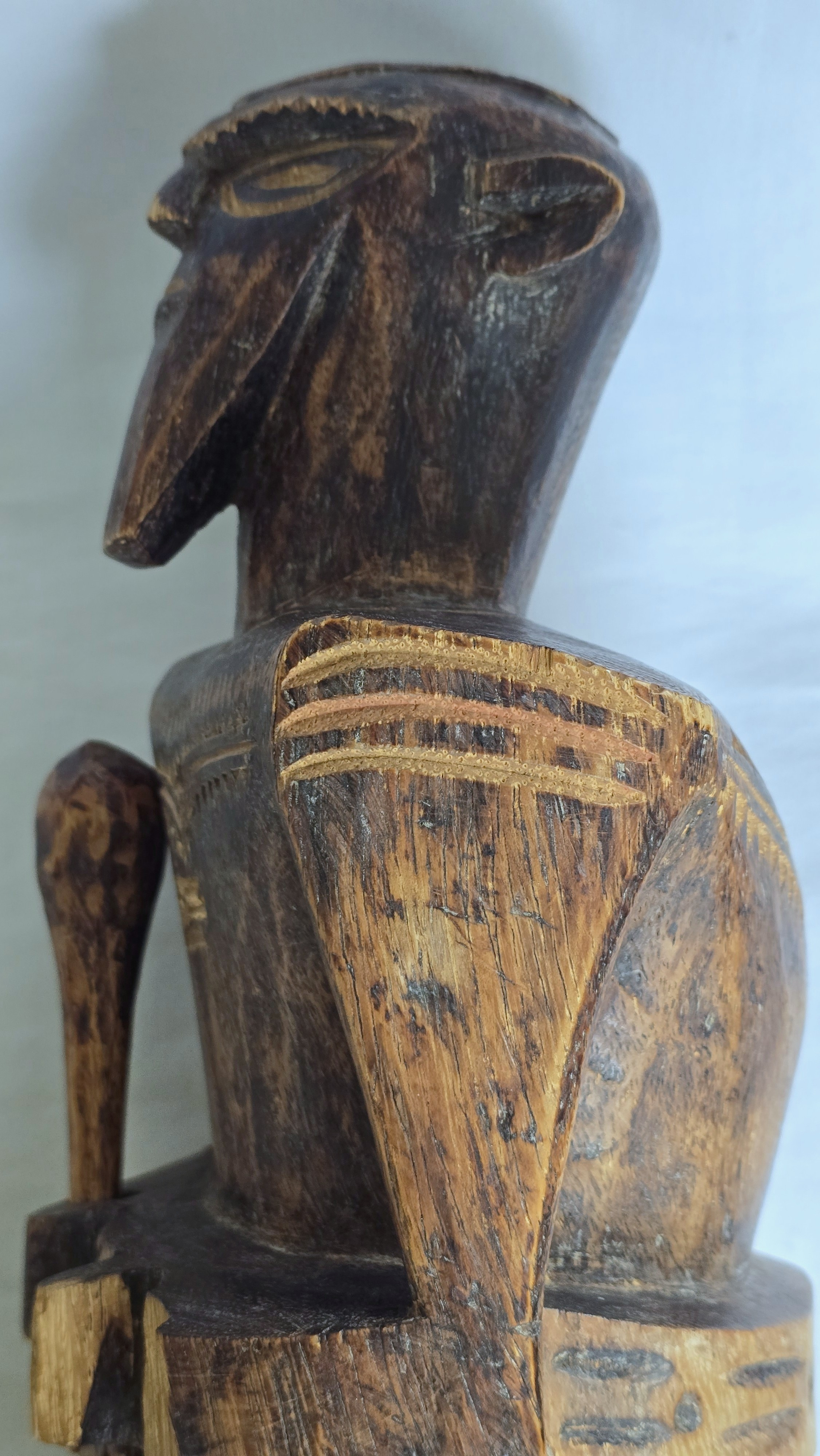
Right shoulder detail showing red ochre pigment

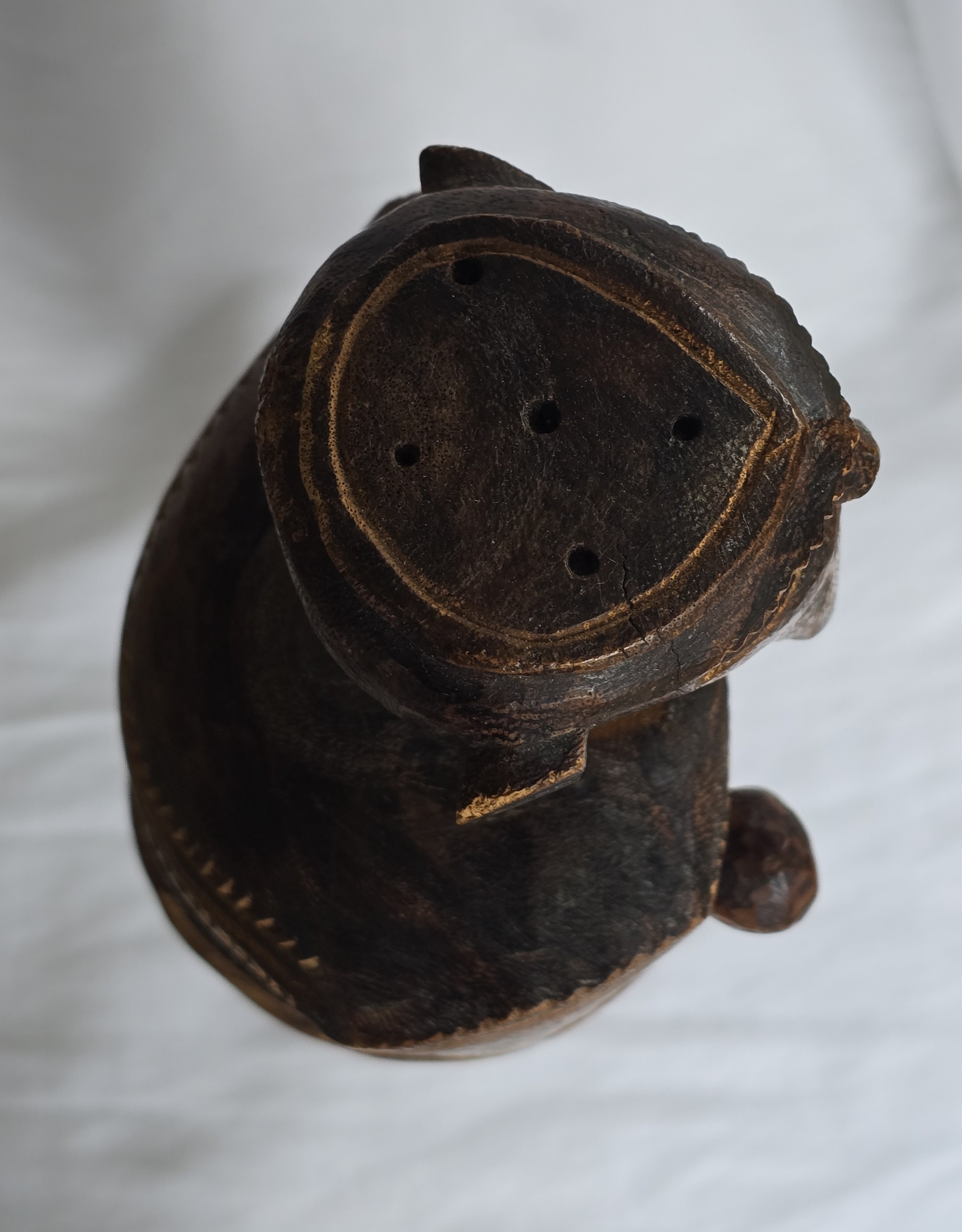
Top of head showing isicoco (head-ring)

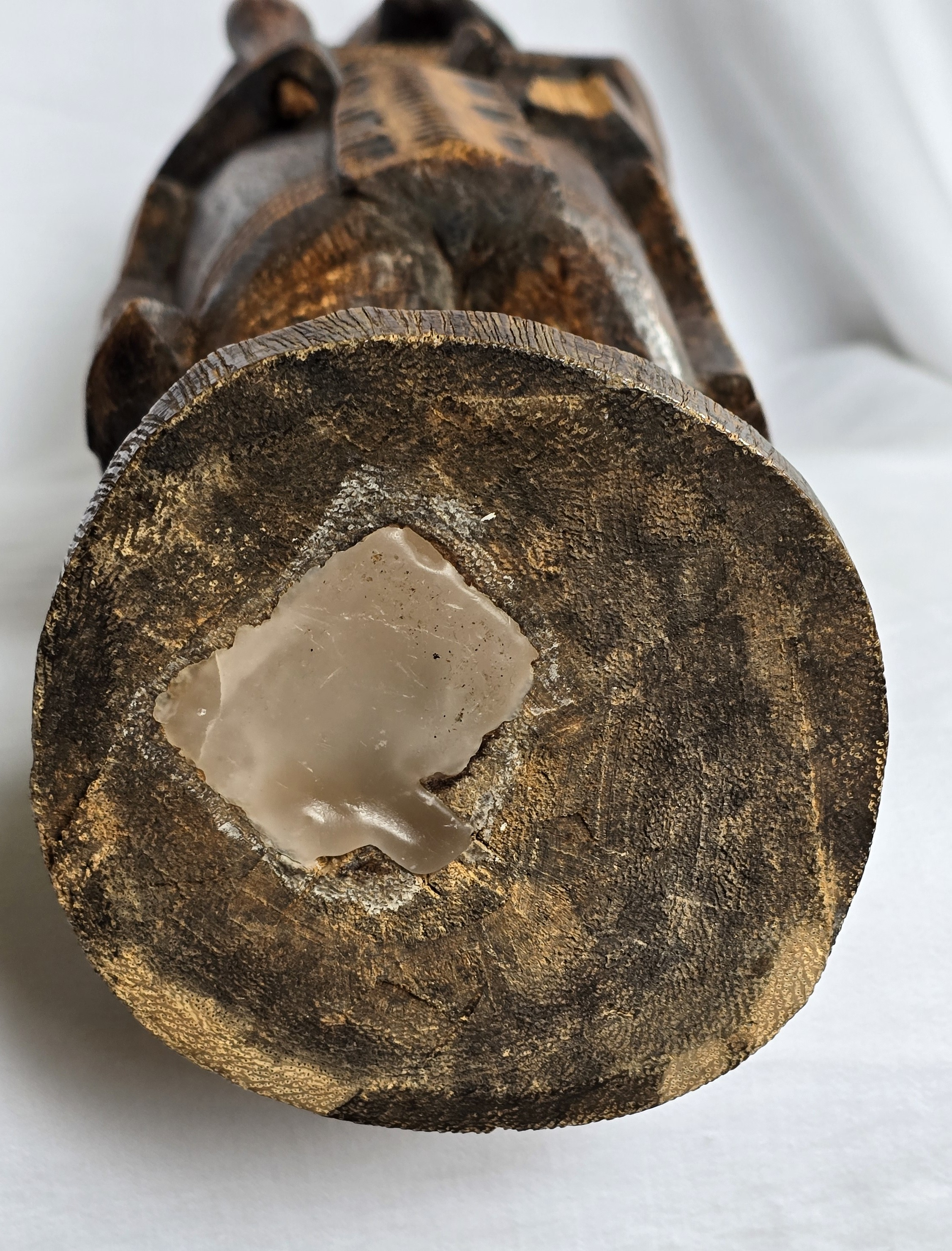
Base showing paraffin-filled cavity from 1976 radiocarbon sampling

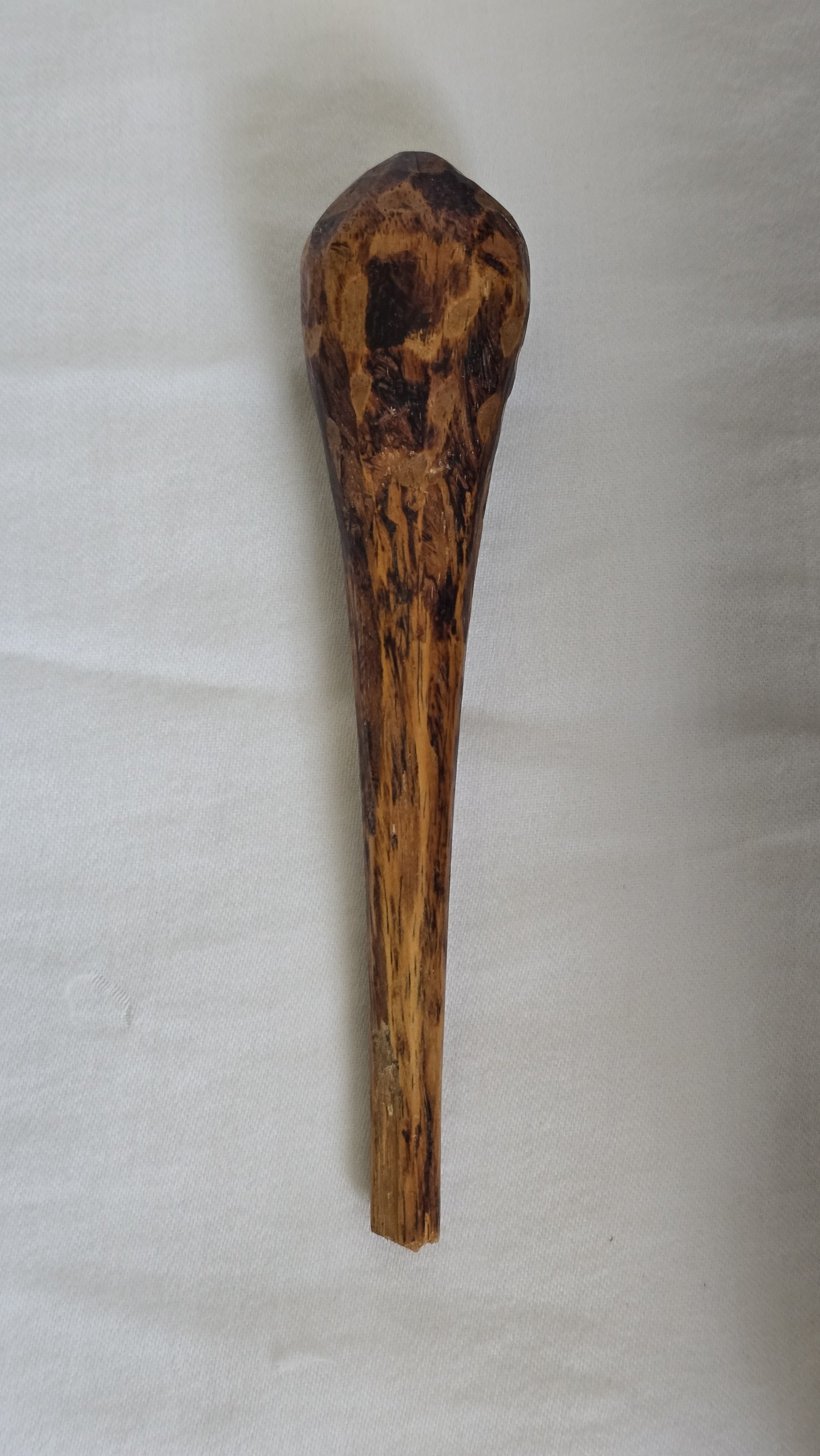
Detachable knobkerrie (club), shown separately
