= Shillelagh =

Wooden walking stick and club or cudgel

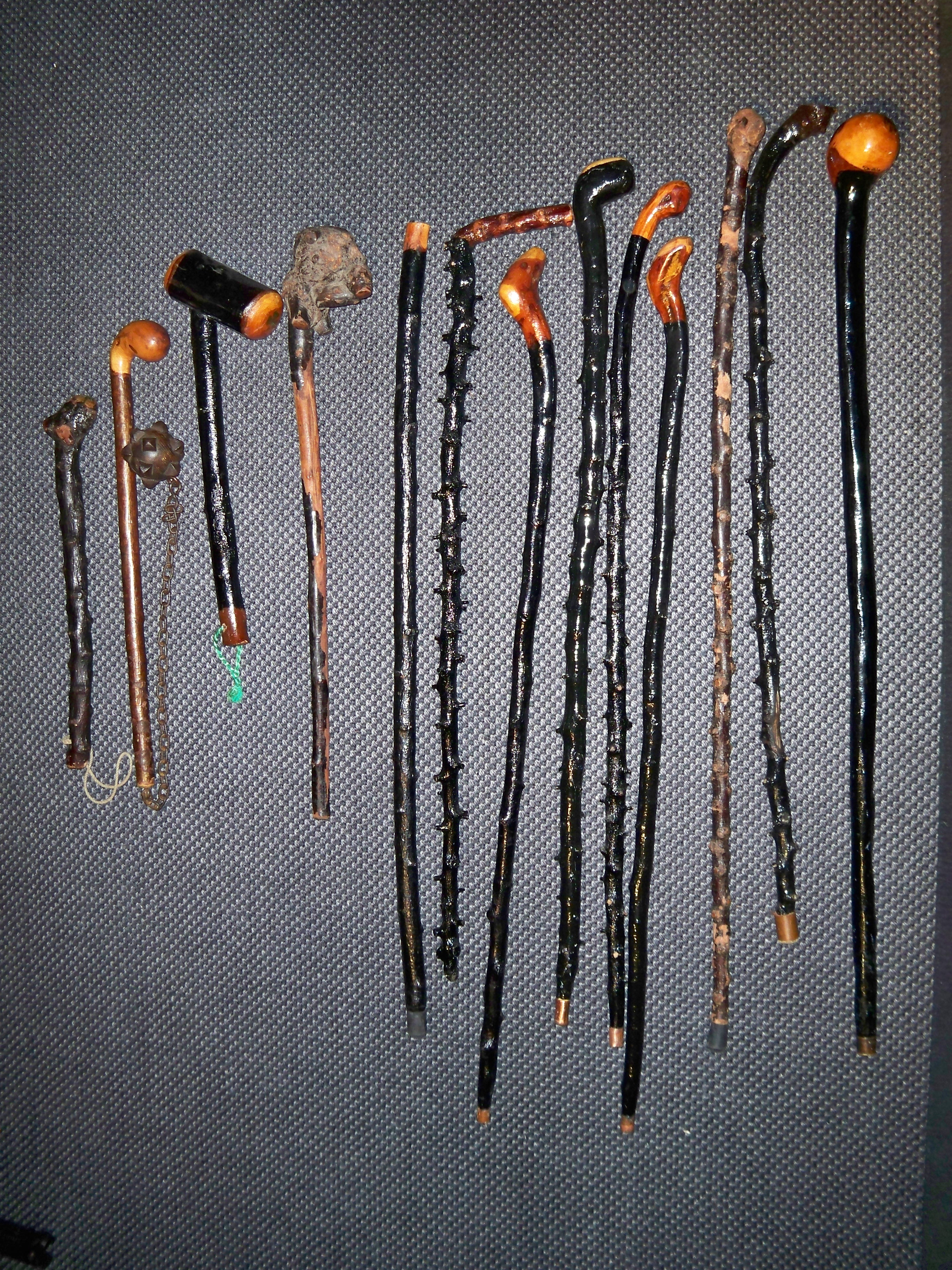
Assorted shillelaghs

A shillelagh (/ʃɪˈleɪli, -lə/ shil-AY-lee, -lə; Irish: sail éille or saill éalaigh [ˌsˠal̠ʲ ˈeːlʲə], 'thonged willow') is a wooden walking stick and club or cudgel, typically made from a stout knotty blackthorn stick with a large knob at the top. It is associated with Ireland and Irish folklore.

Other spelling variants include shillelah, shillalah, and shillaly.

== Etymology ==
The name shillelagh is the Hiberno-English corruption of the Irish (Gaelic) form sail éille, where sail means 'willow' or 'cudgel' and éille is genitive for iall meaning 'thong', 'strap', 'leash', and 'string', among others.

As an alternate etymology, Anna Maria Hall and Patrick Weston Joyce have written that the name may have been derived from the wood being sourced from forest land in the village or barony of Shillelagh, County Wicklow. The geographic name Shillelagh derives from Síol Éalaigh, or 'descendants of Éalach' in English.

== Construction ==
Shillelaghs are traditionally made from blackthorn (sloe) wood (Prunus spinosa) or oak. With the scarcity of oak in Ireland the term came increasingly to denote a blackthorn stick, and therefore blackthorn stick is sometimes glossed as an equivalent to shillelagh.

Wood from the root was prized since this would be used for the knob, and was less prone to crack or break during use.

=== Curing and polishing ===
Most commonly, the chosen wood would be placed up a chimney to cure for a duration of several months to several years; (Note: The stick may be smeared with butter before being hung in the chimney, as a preparatory step.) the accumulated layer of soot gave the shillelagh its typical black shiny appearance.

The less frequent methods were to bury the shank in a dung pile, or in slaked lime. The stick may require protection from its dung bath by being wrapped in well-greased oiled brown paper (steeped in hog's lard or oil).

Both of the previous methods would be finished with oils or sealants, etc. A further coat of special soot finish may be applied, or a mixture of black lead and grease rubbed on with woolen cloth to a polishing finish. Some examples may just be given a coat of black paint.

Rarer still was brining, where the shank was placed into a basin of saltwater. The saltwater, being a hypertonic solution, would pull moisture from the shank with little warping. One isolated case of this brining method being used, by Charlotte Brontë's uncle named Hugh, has been documented. Hugh Brontë is said to have rubbed train oil (whale oil) on the stick using chamois leather, and applied magpie blood to give it a darker appearance.

=== Dimensions ===
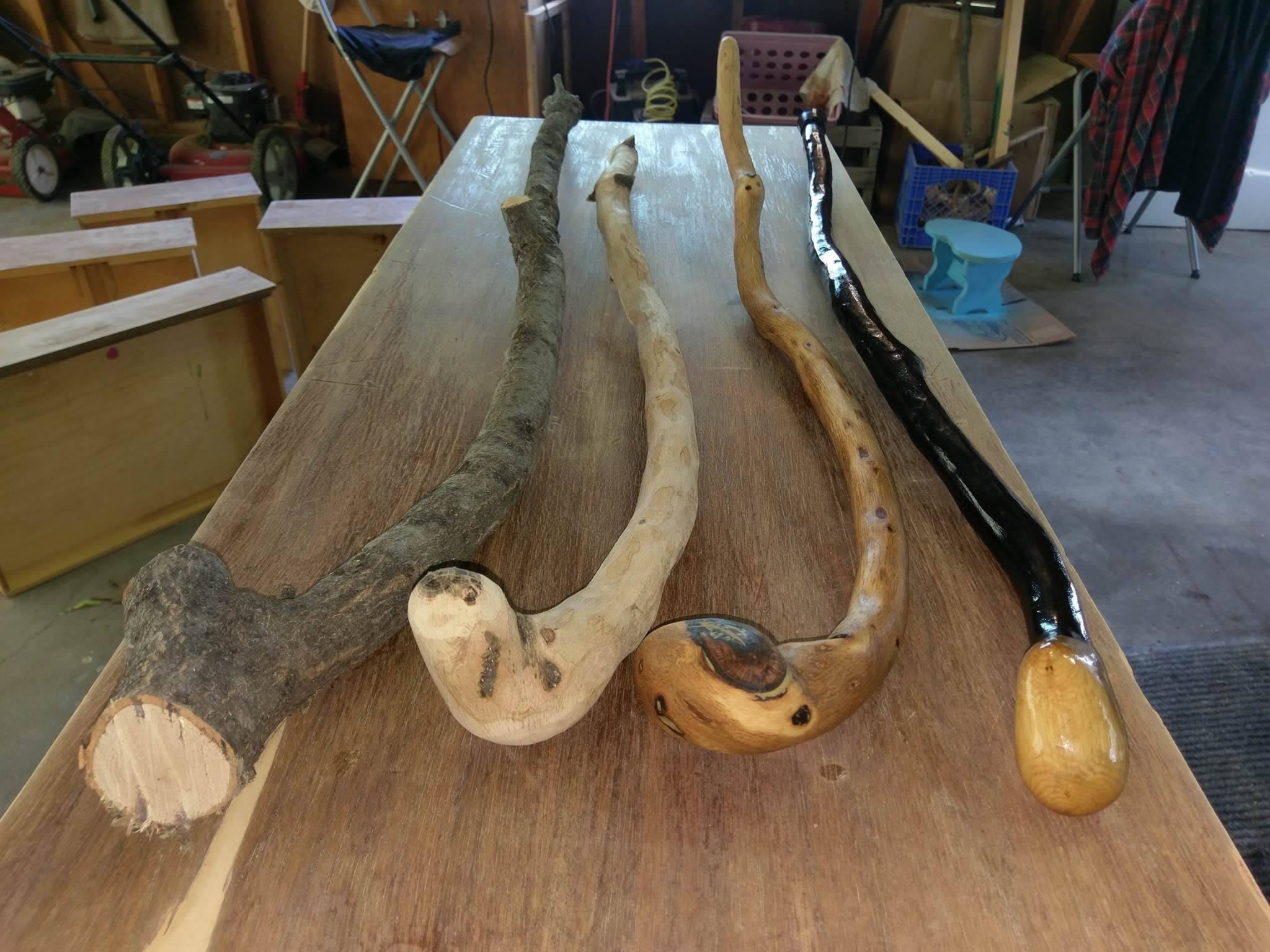
Oaken shillelaghs in various stages of completion

Shillelaghs are commonly the length of a walking-stick (distance from the floor to the wrist with elbow slightly bent), typically about 3 feet (0.91 m), or rather longer at about 4 or 5 feet (1.2 or 1.5 m). In the broad sense, the Shillelagh bata or sticks could include short mallets only 1 to 2 feet (0.30 to 0.61 m) long, to long poles 6 to 9 feet (1.8 to 2.7 m) long.

=== Fittings ===
Shillelaghs may be hollowed at the heavy "hitting" end and filled with molten lead to increase the weight beyond the typical two pounds; this sort of shillelagh is known as a 'loaded stick'. (Note: These loaded versions are called by such names as smachtín (smachtín ceann luaidhe or 'lead-headed cudgel'), and are the size of smaller ailpín.)

This loaded type needed to have its knob fitted with iron ferrules to maintain structural integrity, and the stick also has an iron ferrule fitted onto its narrow end. Shillelaghs may also have a heavy knob for a handle which can be used for striking. Shillelaghs may also have a strap attached, similar to commercially made walking sticks, to place around the holder's wrist.

== History ==
Shillelaghs were used in Ireland for duels, as were swords or pistols in other places, with a code of conduct. Modern practitioners of this form of stick-fighting study the use of the shillelagh for self-defence and as a martial art. Researcher J. W. Hurley writes:

Methods of shillelagh fighting have evolved over a period of thousands of years, from the spear, staff, axe and sword fighting of the Irish. There is some evidence which suggests that the use of Irish stick weapons may have evolved in a progression from a reliance on long spears and wattles, to shorter spears and wattles, to the shillelagh, alpeen, (Note: There is only a vague distinction between shillelagh and alpeen (Diarmaid Ó Muirithe), though the alpeen may be longer or heavier, and be knobbed in the minds of some (P. W. Joyce). An alpeen or ailpeen (Irish: ailpín) is glossed as 'thick alpenstock', 'ashplant', 'club', 'heavy stick'.) blackthorn (walking-stick) and short cudgel. By the 19th century Irish shillelagh-fighting had evolved into a practice which involved the use of three basic types of weapons, sticks which were long, medium or short in length.

Bataireacht, an Irish language term sometimes given as referring to 'cudgelling' or 'beating with a club', refers to a category of stick-fighting in Ireland, with the shillelagh sometimes used in such fights. Also referred to as boiscín, the fighting style is mostly characterised by the use of a cudgel, or knobbed stick, which is grabbed by the third of the handle end, the lower part protecting the elbow and allowing the user to maintain an offensive as well as defensive guard. This grip also allows launching fast punching-like strikes.

Some authors have argued that prior to the 19th century, the term bataireacht had been used to refer to a form of stick-fencing used to train Irish soldiers in broadsword and sabre techniques. This theory has been criticised, including for its lack of primary source material. Although fencing instruction and manuals existed at the time and were available in Ireland and abroad, with one of them illustrating bataireacht among wrestling, boxing and fencing the two systems are in practice substantially different, namely in the active use of the buta, a part of the stick with no equivalent in European swords.

By the 18th century, stick fighting became increasingly associated with Irish gangs called "factions". Irish faction fights involved large groups engaging in melees at county fairs, weddings, funerals and other gatherings. Historians, such as Carolyn Conley, believe that this possibly reflected a culture of recreational violence. It is also argued that faction fighting had class and political overtones, as depicted in the works of William Carleton and James S. Donnelly, Jr.'s Irish Peasants: Violence & Political Unrest, 1780. By the early 19th century, these gangs had organised into larger regional federations, which coalesced from the old Whiteboys, into the Caravat and Shanavest factions. Beginning in Munster, the Caravat and Shanavest "war" erupted sporadically throughout the 19th century and caused several disturbances.

== Folklore and balladry ==
Shillelaghs are sometimes referred to in a similar context in folk songs. In the ballad "Finnegan's Wake" occurs the phrase "Shillelagh law did all engage", signifying that a brawl has broken out; "shillelagh law" itself has been explained as meaning the accepted rule governing the usage of the weapon.

The novelty song "It's the Same Old Shillelagh" was written by Pat White and recorded by him in 1927. Its subject is a young Irish-American who inherits his father's shillelagh.

The anti-recruiting folk song "Arthur McBride", where the recruiters are struck with a shillelagh, and in the 19th-century song "Rocky Road to Dublin", in which references are made to fashioning a shillelagh ("I cut a stout blackthorn"), and using it ("shillalah") to hold a tied bag over one's shoulder, and using it as a striking weapon ("me shillelagh I let fly"), in response to the insults made by "the boys of Liverpool".

Charles Dibdin the younger wrote a song entitled "The Twig of Shelaly", later reprinted as "The Twig of Shillelah".

Bing Crosby recorded a song entitled "Two Shillelagh O'Sullivan" in the 1950s.

In T. H. White's The Once and Future King, he states that "Merry England in Pendragon's time was a little like Poor Ould Ireland in O'Connell's", with factions, including "Papist and Protestant, or Stuart and Orangeman, who would meet together with shillelaghs in their hands and murder in their hearts".

== Modern use ==
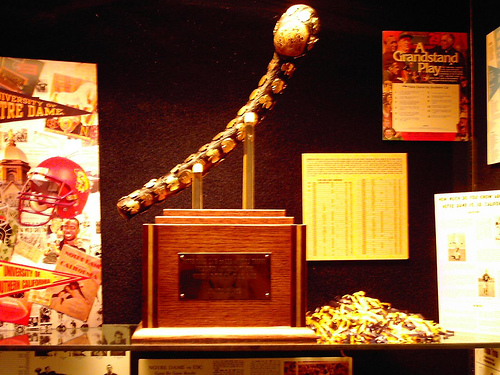
The Jeweled Shillelagh

The shillelagh came to be regarded as a stereotypical symbol of Irishness in popular culture, particularly in an Irish-American context.

Members of a number of Irish regiments in the British Armed Forces have traditionally carried blackthorn sticks, including officers of the Irish Guards, the Royal Irish Regiment and the Royal Dragoon Guards. Officers and senior non-commissioned officers of the 69th Infantry Regiment (The Fighting 69th) of the New York Army National Guard also carry shillelaghs whilst on parade.

In sports, the Boston Celtics logo depicts a leprechaun with a shillelagh, as does the logo of the Brisbane Brothers Rugby league team in Australia. In San Diego, Padres broadcaster Mark Grant popularised the shillelagh as a rallying call, by using terms like "Shillelagh Power" to describe late-game heroics by the Padres. The success of the phrase led the San Diego Padres store to carry inflatable shillelaghs. Similarly, in American college football, the Jeweled Shillelagh trophy was traditionally given to the winner of the annual rivalry game between the University of Southern California Trojans and the University of Notre Dame Fighting Irish.

The US MGM-51 anti-tank missile was named Shillelagh. An aircraft of the US 357th Fighter Group was named The Shillelagh!, with a club painted on the nose. In the tabletop game Dungeons & Dragons, 'shillelagh' is a low-level spell used by casters to make simple clubs into powerful bludgeoning weapons.

== See also ==
- Arnis, fighting sticks in the martial art of the Philippines
- Knobkerrie, a similar club associated with Southern Africa and World War I British troops
- Rungu (weapon), a similar club common in East Africa
