= Rungu (weapon) =

Traditional East African wooden club

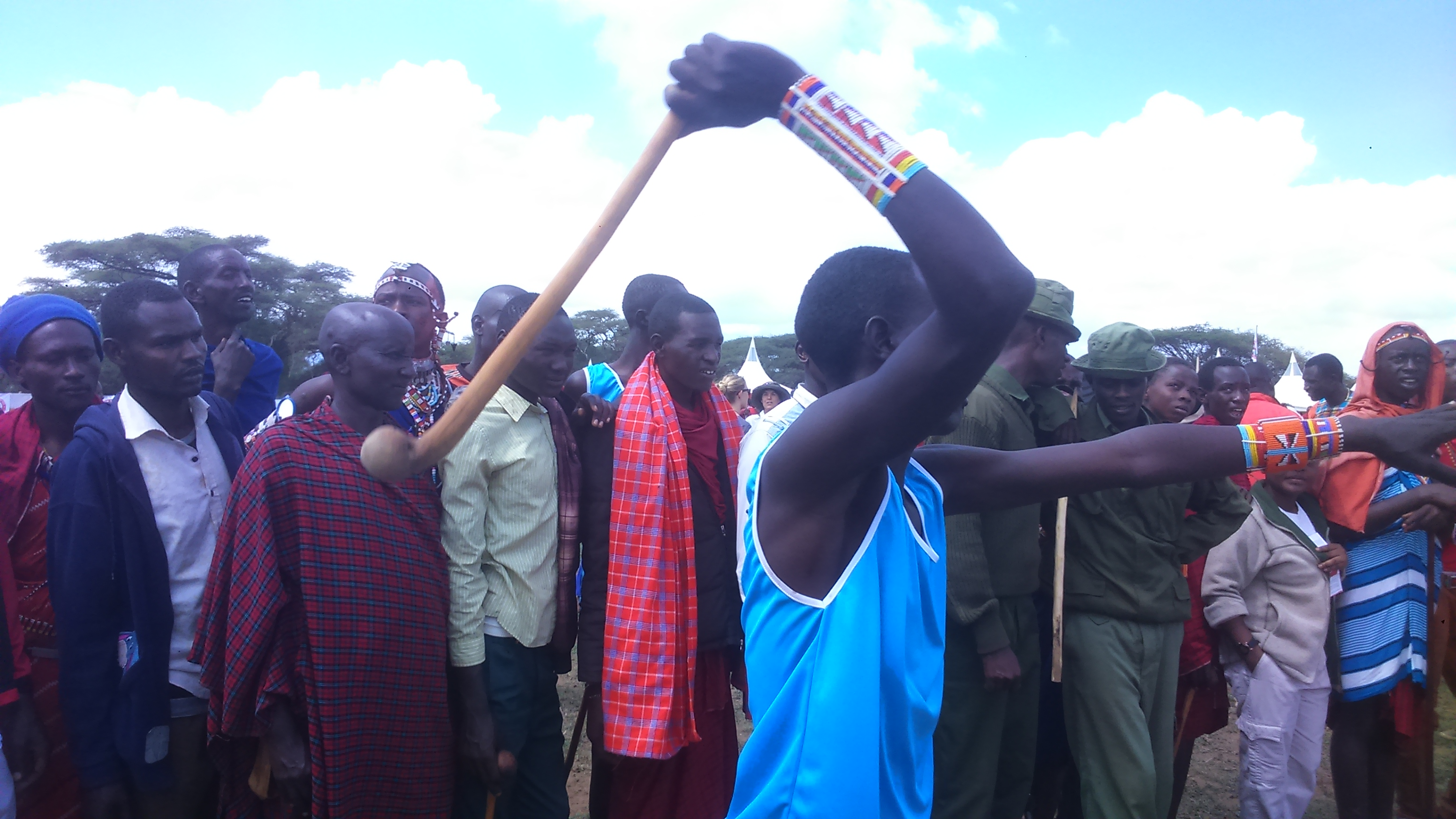
Rungu throwing

A rungu (Swahili, plural marungu) is a wooden throwing club or baton bearing special symbolism and significance in certain East African tribal cultures. It is especially associated with Maasai morans (male warriors) who have traditionally used it in warfare and for hunting. It is a commonly encountered tourist souvenir in that part of the world.

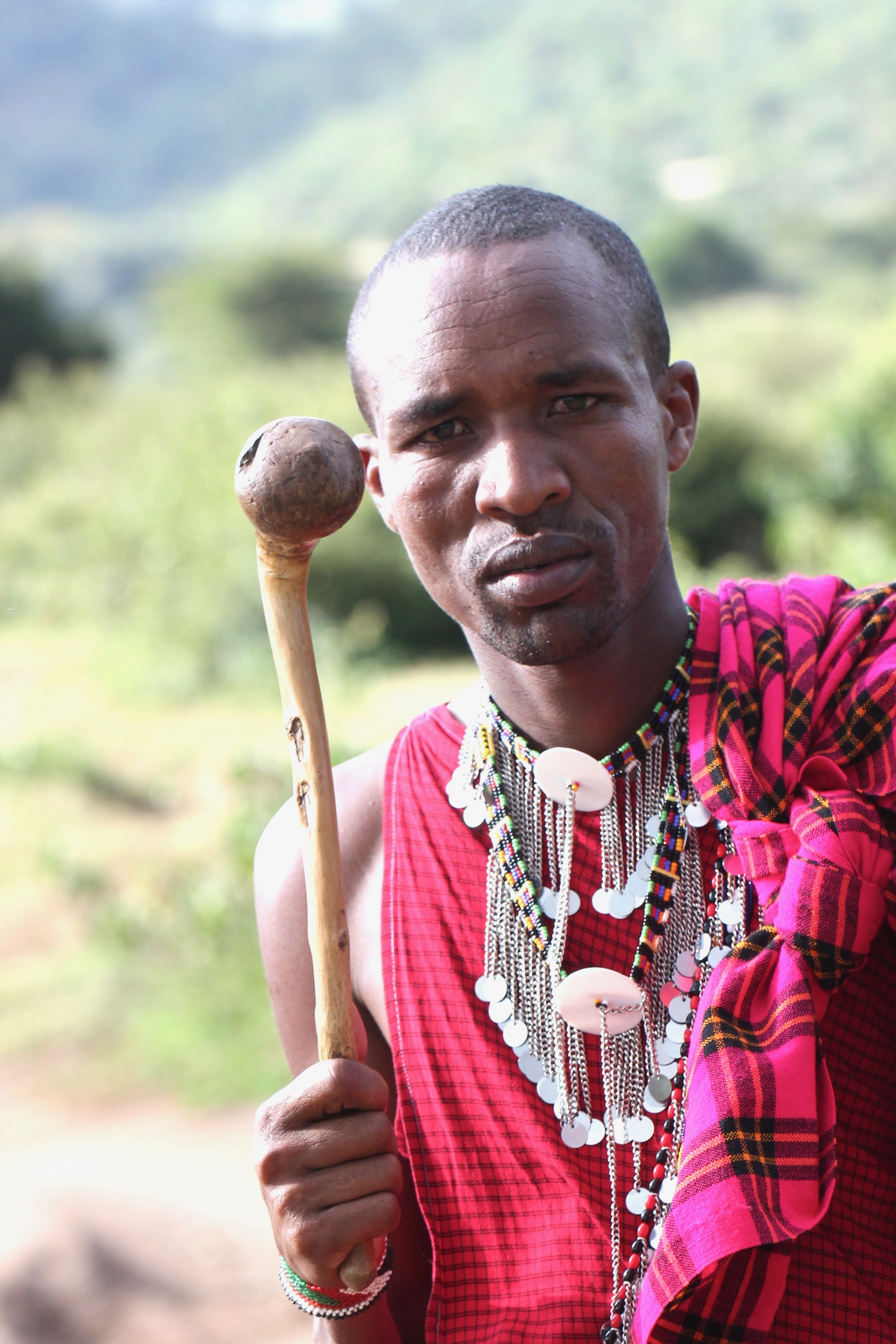
Maasai man holding a rungu

Rungus are typically about 45–50 cm (18–20 inches) in length with a long narrow shaft for a handle and heavy knob or ball at the end in the manner of other indigenous cudgels such as the Irish shillelagh or South African knobkierie.

In Maasai culture, the rungu (orinka in Maa) is an important emblem of warrior status for young men. A special one is held by the designated speaker at important tribal gatherings. Although utilitarian examples are made of simple hard wood, ceremonial rungus may be elaborately carved or made of other materials. Local women are widely employed in sewing decorative beads onto the handles of those made for the tourist trade.

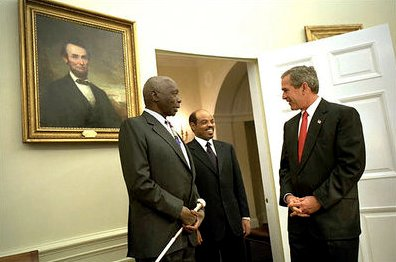
Former Kenyan President Daniel Moi standing left holding his Rungu

Former Kenyan President Daniel arap Moi was invariably seen at important public functions holding an elegant gold- or silver-tipped ivory rungu. He referred to it as his fimbo ya nyayo (Swahili, "Nyayo's staff- 'Nyayo' was a moniker that refers to President Moi") and would pound it on a table when angry, sometimes shattering the rungu.
