= Knobkerrie =

Form of wooden club, usually having a large knob at one end

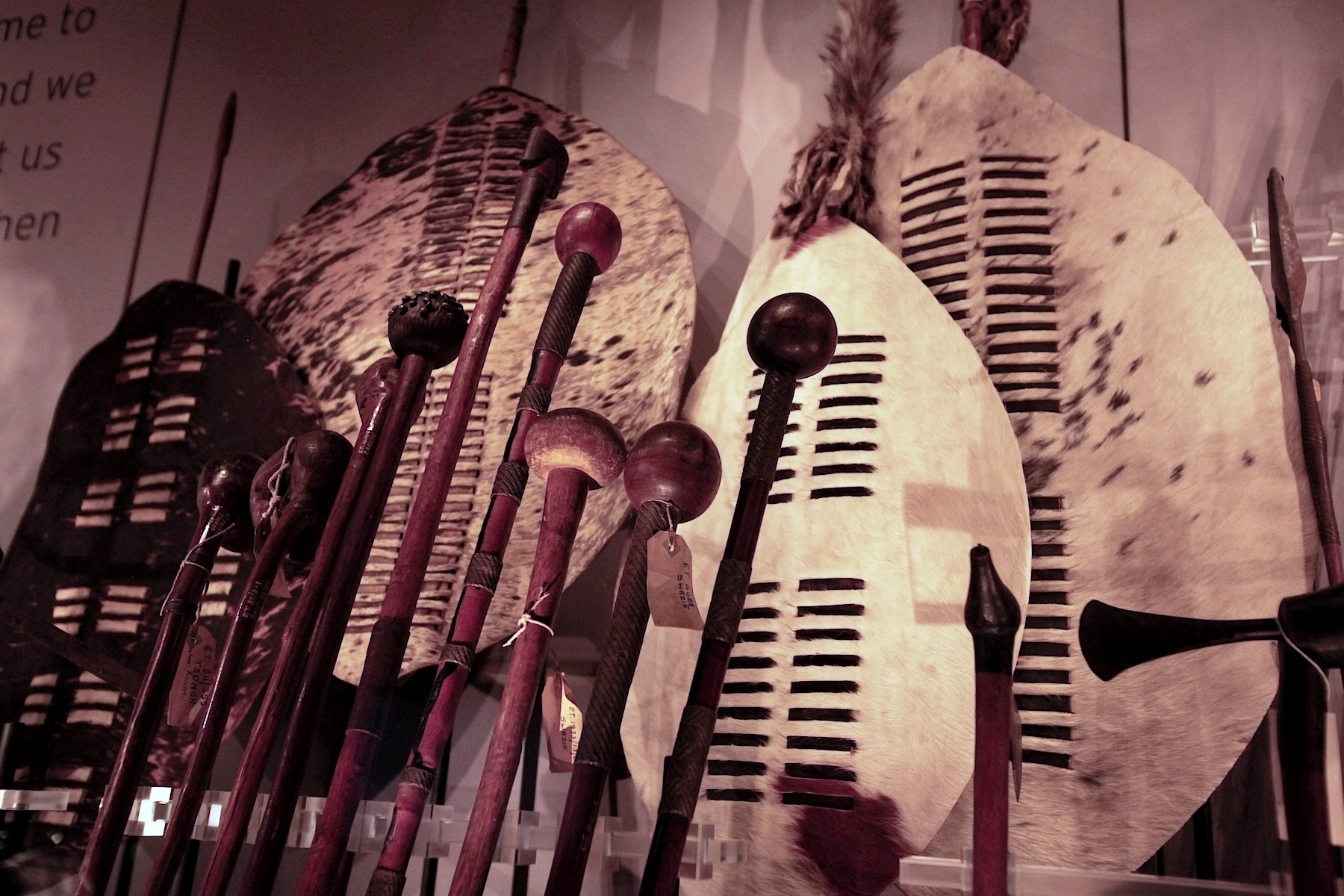
A display of Zulu knobkerries (foreground)

A knobkerrie, also spelled knobkerry, knobkierie, and knopkierie (Afrikaans), is a form of wooden club, used mainly in Southern Africa and Eastern Africa. Typically they have a large knob at one end and can be used for clubbing an enemy's head. For the various peoples who use them, they often have marked cultural significance. Being able to carry the knobkerrie has also had a political dimension, especially in South Africa.

== Name ==
The name derives from the Afrikaans word knop, meaning knob or ball and the Khoekhoe or San word kirri, meaning walking stick. The name has been extended to similar weapons used by the native peoples of Australia, the Pacific islands, and other places, and was also used in the British army.

== Uses in southern Africa and abroad ==
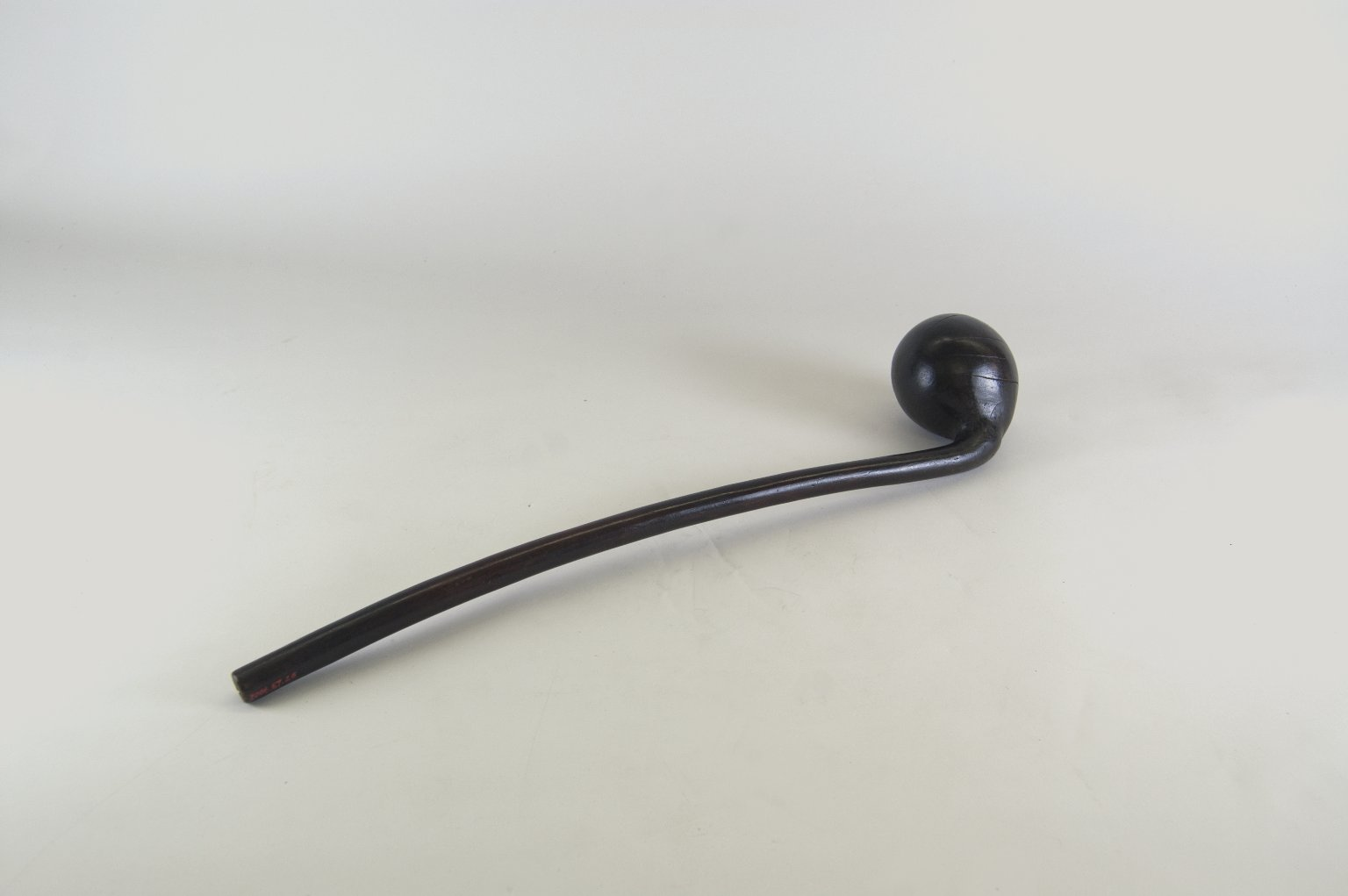
A Zulu iwisa with a spherical head.

Knobkerries were an indispensable weapon of war both in Africa and abroad. In Africa, the weapon found particular use among Nguni peoples. Among the Zulu people they are known as iwisa. The iwisa was not typically used in combat – though they were occasionally used as thrown weapons in place of the throwing spear or isijula. Instead, the Zulu used iwisa as swagger sticks, ceremonial objects, or even as snuff containers. In the 20th century, the Zulu nationalist movement Inkatha viewed iwisa as traditional weapons and lobbied for the right to carry such weapons in public. However, many sources emphasise the historical use of the iwisa in close-combat, where it was used to deliver blows, and also in executions.

A detachable knobkerrie is among the features of the Farmingdale Statue, a wooden figure attributed to the Zulu or another Nguni group, radiocarbon dated to approximately A.D. 1630 and discovered in South Farmingdale, New York in 1961.

The Ndebele variant was known as induku and is similar in design to the Zulu iwisa. It was used as a swagger stick or thrown weapon. The induku could also be fashioned into the handle of a fighting axe which, unlike the Zulu, the Ndebele used as weapons of war. Tsonga clubs were also similar to the Zulu and Ndebele type with spherical heads but variants with more elongated oval heads were also used in what is now Mozambique. The Sotho under Mosheshe did not adopt Zulu style weapons and tactics and so unlike the Zulus it was regarded as an important weapon of war.

Outside Africa, the British called their trench clubs knobkerries during World War I, though their form was often not traditional. The weapon was used in No Man's Land by the poet Siegfried Sassoon as relayed in the Sherston trilogy, his pseudonymous autobiography.

During the Apartheid era in South Africa, they were often carried and used by protesters and sometimes by the police opposing them. Knobkerries are still widely carried, especially in rural areas, while in times of peace it serves as a walking-stick, sometimes ornamental. Knobkerries are still commonly carried by protesters.

Knobkerries commonly feature on national and other symbols in Southern Africa. In South Africa they feature on the South African Coat of Arms, though lying down symbolising peace. They are also depicted on the Order of Mendi for Bravery. A knobkerrie appeared on the former flag of Lesotho between 1987 and 2006, on the Coat of Arms and royal standards of Lesotho since its independence in 1966, and on the Coat of Arms of the former (nominally independent) republic of Ciskei.

== Molamu ==
Used by the Sotho people and made from the Mohlware tree Olea africana, it is a walking stick and alternatively can be used as a weapon. It is traditionally carried by men and boys from puberty.

=== Practical use ===
A molamu symbolises authority and power, and represents a readiness to separate an enemy from a friend. The molamu is symbolically used to break, to protect, to judge and to rectify social injustices.

=== Initiation ===
The molamu is an indicator of one's adult male status along with the Basotho blanket seana marena, and are visual expressions of both practical and esoteric Sesotho ideals. Molamu is a sign of manhood, all male initiates carry it upon their return from lebollo la banna. The molamu is traditionally passed down from one generation to another as men go through initiation. It is used to declare to Badimo that the young man has returned from his initiation, and garners their support and blessings. The molamu is held up while the initiates sing "ditoko", with the singer's eyes intently focused upon it. The molamu is also used to teach initiates the methods of "ho ya ka lanwa", which is a historical Sesotho martial art.

=== Spiritual use ===
The molamu is also used to bind empowering medicines, or moriana, to the staff, which affects the "seriti" which is the character or spirit of the owner. It is also a visual indicator of one's transition to adulthood, and maintains spiritual significance in Sesotho society.

=== Modern uses ===
Following an initiate's public introduction as a functioning member of Basotho adult society the molamu is typically stored in the ceiling of one's home, and represents the physical presence of the unseen.

In contemporary southern Africa, one can also find decorative variations carried by new initiates after returning to their homes. These serve as accessories to the heavily ornamented outfits worn by the young men as a sign of celebration during the weeks following their return, and equally express the celebration of newly gained adulthood, drawing attention to the initiates.

== Popular culture ==
- Knobkerries were among many weapons used by the Zulus on Zulu and Zulu Dawn.
- A knobkerrie was the main weapon of M'Baku, the Marvel Cinematic Universe's version of the Man-Ape, who uses it on the 2018 version of the Black Panther as well as Avengers: Infinity War and Avengers: Endgame.
- On Deadliest Warrior, Shaka Zulu uses a knobkerrie versus William Wallace.
- In the book Lying Down With Dogs by Mark Zygadlo, a black knobkerry is carried by a "fearsome dwarf" in Chapter 4.
- The protagonist of George Bernard Shaw's short story The Adventures of the Black Girl in Her Search for God wields a knobkerrie.
- Sara Penn's boutique was named Knobkerry, referencing the protagonist's weapon in The Adventures of the Black Girl in Her Search for God.
- Neville, the Flying Swan's part-time barman in Robert Rankin's Brentford Trilogy, keeps a knobkerrie behind the bar to deal with unruly patrons.
- Wilbur Smith, the South African author, in his book When the Lion Feeds, also refers to these weapons as kerrie which are used to throw at birds and animals in the bush to kill them.

== See also ==
- Rungu (weapon) a similar club common in East Africa
- Shillelagh similar club associated with Ireland
- Sotho people
