= History of the Rhodesian Light Infantry (1977–1980) =

The 1st Battalion, The Rhodesian Light Infantry, commonly the Rhodesian Light Infantry (1RLI or RLI), served in the Rhodesian Bush War as part of the Rhodesian Security Forces between 1964 and 1979, under the unrecognised government of Rhodesia after its Unilateral Declaration of Independence from Britain on 11 November 1965. Latterly, during the second half of 1979, it fought for Zimbabwe Rhodesia, a reorganised version of Rhodesia under a black majority government which still went unrecognised. After an interim period under British control from December 1979 to April 1980, the RLI briefly remained active within the armed forces of the internationally recognised Republic of Zimbabwe, but did not see action under this government. It laid up its colours on 17 October 1980 and disbanded two weeks later.

Fireforce actions, begun in 1974, had become so prominent that the RLI became an airborne commando battalion in 1977, and soon began to parachute into action up to three times a day. Operation Grapple, in the centre of the country, began in the same year and in 1978 Operation Splinter was opened, covering Lake Kariba. SALOPS ("Salisbury Operations"), a separate operational area for the capital, was also made. The war intensified strongly during the late 1970s as further attempts for diplomatic resolution failed, leading to yet more regular Fireforce actions, operations outside Rhodesia's borders and heavier casualties for the RLI.

== Conversion to airborne commando battalion; evolution of Fireforce ==
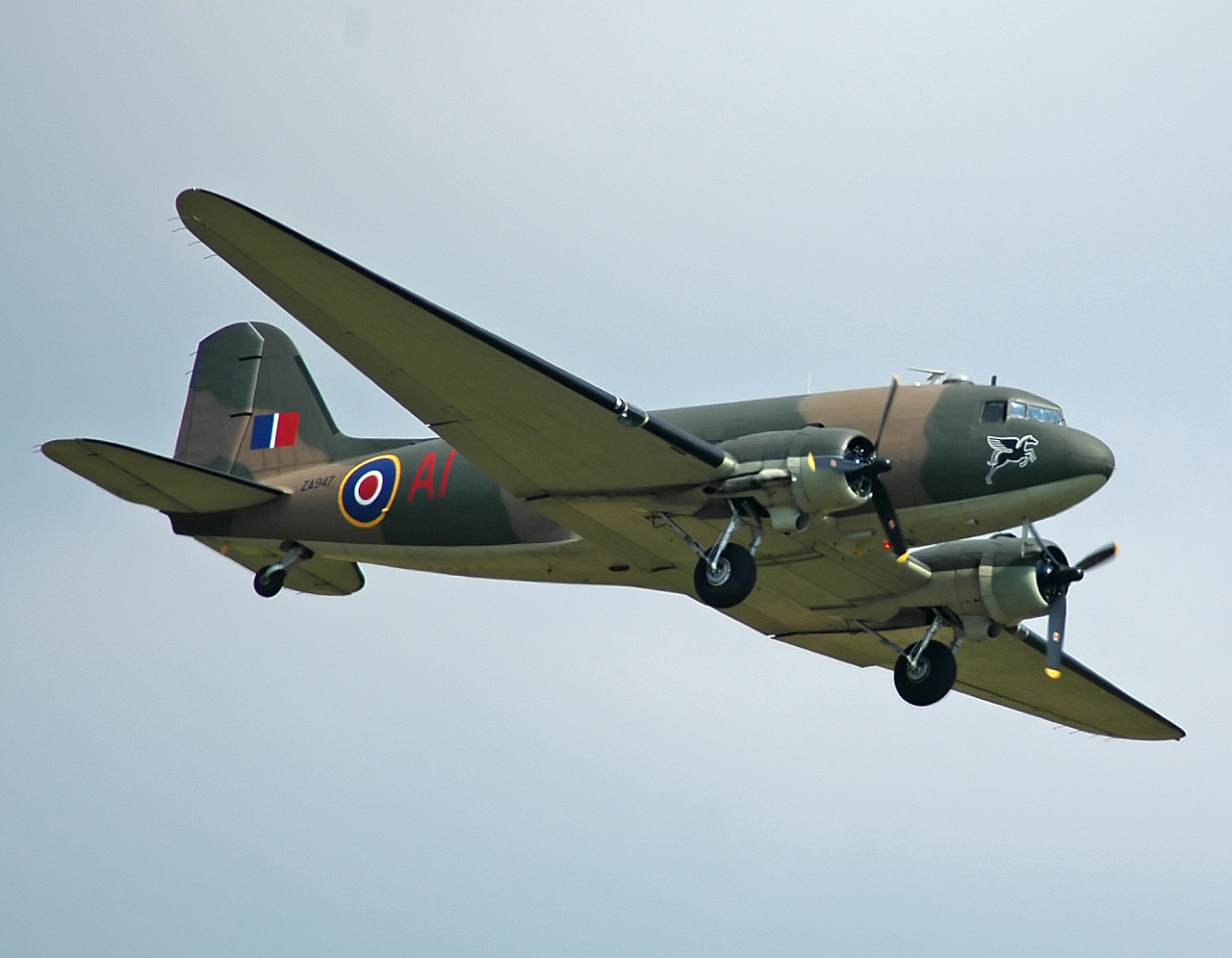
A Dakota troop transport plane of the Royal Air Force. From 1977, 20 RLI men, about two-thirds of a Fireforce "First Wave", would parachute into action from a Rhodesian Air Force "Paradak" while the rest would be dropped by Alouette III helicopters.

The RLI had been experimenting with parachutes sparingly since 1967, but the process of training the entire regiment in their use did not start until November 1976, when two troops from 1 Commando underwent instruction at New Sarum Air Base in Salisbury. This marked the beginning of the RLI's transformation into an airborne commando battalion. Parachute training for the rest of the Battalion's men began in January 1977, when two troops from 3 Commando went to New Sarum. Key factors in the decision to train the RLI as paratroopers were the consistent good performance of the first RLI men para-trained, the shortage of Rhodesian helicopters, and the improved ability of the guerrillas to fire upon and wound security force members aboard helicopters, which had previously been an unusual occurrence. Lynx light support aircraft were also sometimes hit, and for this reason machine-guns were now fitted alongside the Frantans (Note: A "Frantan" was a 1.8 metres (5 ft 11 in) long Rhodesian-made napalm bomb developed by the Royal Rhodesian Air Force during the 1960s. They were filled with about 73 litres (16 imp gal; 19 US gal) of napalm. During development they were given the name "frangible tanks" to obscure their real purpose. The common abbreviation "Frantan" stuck when they entered service.) that they were carrying.

From March 1977, each RLI Commando sent troops on a regular rotational timetable to New Sarum for para-training. (Note: Because the facilities at New Sarum were limited and of too small a scale, an agreement was reached in 1978 to use the South African Defence Force (SADF) Tempe Air Base at Bloemfontein as well.) "Not everyone was thrilled with the idea," says Chris Cocks, an RLI veteran. "... [Trooper W.] Smit, the MAG gunner, was terrified and said adamantly, 'I'm not going. If God had wanted us to fly he would have given us wings.'" Rhodesian, British, American and Australian instructors trained the RLI men quickly, but comprehensively. Some of the foreign soldiers were already para-trained, having served in parachute units abroad, but it was still necessary for them to attend. After completing their basic instruction, the RLI soldiers boarded a Dakota troop transport plane (or "Paradak") for their first jump. Loaded up with all of their combat gear, they jumped in sticks of two. After eight jumps, including one at night, each RLI soldier became a qualified paratrooper, received his "wings" and returned to action.

Because the RLI soldiers could now parachute into action, some changes were made to Fireforce procedure. For a start, the number of G-cars in a Fireforce was reduced; only three of the eight sticks—12 of the 32 men—would now be dropped by helicopter, with the remainder jumping from a Paradak. To prevent themselves from becoming easy targets for ground fire, the RLI paratroopers would jump from low altitudes so they would be in the air for as short a time as possible. The regulation height decreed by the Rhodesian Security Forces was 500 feet (150 m), but in practice it was much lower, sometimes as low as 300 feet (91 m). The lowest recorded operational jump by an RLI soldier was from a height of 217 feet (66 m). Jumps such as this would give the parachute barely enough time to open before the Rhodesian soldier landed, and landing could be dangerous as the terrain was often rough or rocky. However, the men of the RLI quickly became skilled paratroopers. On operations, they would jump from the Paradak door as quickly as possible, one after the other, so they would land close together and around the same time: a seasoned group of 20 RLI men would jump in less than 20 seconds. They would exit the aircraft in the order desired on the ground, with the commander in the middle of the stick.

The men of the Rhodesian Light Infantry made more parachute jumps than any other military unit in history. While an Allied paratrooper of the Second World War would be considered a "veteran" after one operational jump, an RLI paratrooper could make three operational jumps in a single day, each in a different location, and each preceding a successful contact with the enemy. Between 1976 and 1980, over 14,000 jumps were recorded by the Rhodesian Security Forces as a whole. The world record for operational jumps by an individual soldier is held by Corporal Des Archer of 1 Commando, RLI, who made 73 operational jumps between 1977 and the end of the war.

== The Bush War intensifies ==
After seven years in "hibernation", as Leroy Thompson puts it, the Zimbabwe People's Revolutionary Army (ZIPRA) attached to Joshua Nkomo's Zimbabwe African People's Union (ZAPU) returned to major activity in 1977. Though it had been the more aggressive nationalist army during the late 1960s, its long quiet period had resulted in the Zimbabwe African National Liberation Army (ZANLA) becoming a more potent threat to the Rhodesian government and security forces. ZANLA, the military wing of the Zimbabwe African National Union (ZANU), had been led by Robert Mugabe since his and Nkomo's release from prison in December 1974 as part of an abortive ceasefire deal. Seeing that political victory for the militant nationalists over the Rhodesian government was now a conceivable possibility, ZIPRA realised around this time that they had to appear more assertive to maintain political support in the face of ZANLA's growth in stature. ZIPRA therefore split itself into a lesser guerrilla force, operating within Rhodesia, and a larger conventional army, based in Zambia. ZIPRA planned to eventually use this army, which was trained by Cuban and Soviet officers, to overtly invade Rhodesia and engage the security forces in the field. In the face of this growing insurgency, with about 2,500 cadres operating inside the country, the security forces formed a Combined Operations Headquarters in March 1977; this became known as COMOPS. Command was given to Lieutenant-General Peter Walls, who had led the RLI between 1964 and 1967.

=== Operation Aztec ===
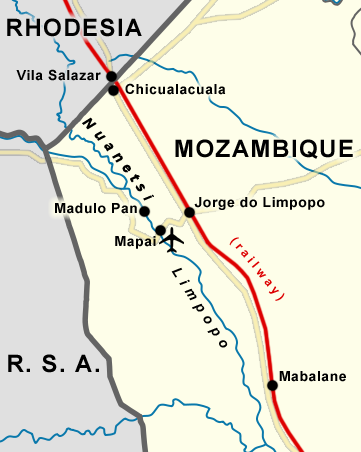
Operation Aztec, lasting from 28 May to 2 June 1977, centred around the Vila Salazar–Maputo railway

The RLI took part in Operation Aztec between late May and early June 1977, working alongside the Rhodesia Regiment (RR) and the Selous Scouts. A three-pronged Rhodesian attack on FRELIMO and ZANLA staging posts just over the border in Mozambique's Gaza Province was planned to restrict the guerrillas' infiltration into Rhodesia's south-east. The 2nd Battalion, RR was tasked to penetrate 10 kilometres (6.2 mi) south over the border from Vila Salazar, a small village near the corner of Mozambique, Rhodesia and South Africa, and attack a ZANLA staging camp to create a diversion. At the same time, a group of heliborne RLI men would attack ZANLA's Rio base close to the Nuanetsi River while two sticks of RLI paratroopers would be dropped into Madulo Pan, a major ZANLA position near the fork of the Nuanetsi and Limpopo. The Selous Scouts would move as a flying column along the Vila Salazar–Maputo railway line and eliminate all ZANLA camps between Vila Salazar and Jorge do Limpopo, a key strategic position on the railway.

The operation began on 28 May 1977, at dusk, when 72 Selous Scouts crossed the border near Vila Salazar on a bush track, dressed in FRELIMO uniforms, driving 14 FRELIMO-pattern vehicles and commanded by Major John Murphy, an American Vietnam veteran. Moving slowly because of the darkness, they reached the south-bound Chicualacuala road soon after first light, just in time to see the Rhodesian Air Force (RhAF) Canberra bombers flying over on their way to drop air strikes on Madulo Pan soon after 06:00. Two twelve-man sticks from 2 Commando, RLI sat aboard a Dakota, ready to parachute into Madulo Pan from 500 feet (150 m), led by the two stick leaders, Lance-Corporals Jimmy Swan and "Budgie" Nicholson. Just after the Canberra air strikes, the paratroopers dropped to engage any ZANLA guerrillas who remained from the 150 based there. Though parachute troops were usually the target of ground fire while in the air, this time there was none; the area was silent as 2 Commando landed. The soldiers formed up into an extended sweep line and advanced towards the camp, which had been almost completely destroyed by the Rhodesian bombing raid. Neither insurgents nor bodies were found, but the 2 Commando men did discover fresh tracks heading east, directly towards Jorge do Limpopo. The Rhodesians judged that the guerrillas must have hastily evacuated the camp, having been forewarned at short notice, and retreated towards the town.

The RLI men were then instructed to fall in near the road and await Murphy's flying column, which had nearly reached Jorge do Limpopo. The flying column was easily spotted by 2 Commando because of the manner of their advance; the extremely aggressive Scouts were firing into any position that could potentially be an ambush as they moved, sending huge plumes of dust into the air at regular intervals. The two Rhodesian forces rendezvoused, combined and drove on towards Jorge do Limpopo in the disguised vehicles. They met with scattered FRELIMO–ZANLA rocket and mortar fire when they reached the town's outskirts. The Scouts returned heavy fire, all 14 vehicles opening up their guns at the same time, while Murphy called for air support. With this in mind, he told the RLI paratroopers to advance quickly on foot and take out the anti-aircraft guns up ahead.

It was mayhem ... We ran straight at these guys who were taking cover from the Hunters that were strafing the streets with their 40 mm cannons. Jesus, what sheer power! ... It was a noise you could never forget.

— RLI Lance-Corporal Jimmy Swan recalls the assault on Jorge do Limpopo on 29 May 1977

The 24 men from 2 Commando charged the anti-aircraft positions as RhAF Hawker Hunters flew in overhead at 100 feet (30 m), strafing the FRELIMO–ZANLA lines. The guerrillas retreated into well-camouflaged foxholes as the Rhodesians moved forward. The RLI men were now joined by most of the Selous Scouts, who left their vehicles outside the town. Nearby buildings were swept for hidden guerrillas while 2 Commando bombed three bunkers, killing nine or ten FRELIMO fighters. With resistance at the town's border destroyed, the Scouts now advanced through it street by street, clearing it quickly, efficiently and ruthlessly. The Rhodesians rendezvoused at Jorge do Limpopo railway station, where the flying column's vehicles assembled. Murphy discovered that the main ZANLA base had been moved to Mapai, a village with an airstrip on the Nuanetsi River to the south-west, and diverted his force to attack it. He advised 2 Commando that three of its sticks—the two from Madulo Pan, and another—would remain to defend Jorge do Limpopo against any potential counter-attack, commanded by Lieutenant Mike Rich, while the rest of the Commando would support the Selous Scouts' advance on Mapai. When all was prepared late on 29 May, Murphy enthusiastically broadcast the column's departure, waving his arms and shouting, "Tally ho and away we go!"

The men who remained at Jorge do Limpopo resolved to set up an ambush position in a patch of tall trees to the north of the town, as nowhere else nearby provided any cover. As most of the air force had now returned to Rhodesia, with the remaining helicopters supporting the column, the RLI men felt abandoned, in the open and somewhat nervous. While the soldiers quietly moved around the trees, about 50 metres (160 ft) from a road, they heard shouting ahead, and dropped to the ground to avoid being seen, facing the road in an extended line. Between 50 and 60 heavily armed ZANLA guerrillas, armed with RPD light machine-guns, RPG-7 rocket launchers and similar weapons, marched past. They were on their way to attack the flying column, and did not notice the RLI men hiding near the road. Rich decided to proceed with the plan to set up the ambush in the trees and call for assistance regarding the cadres, reasoning that attacking now would only get his men killed. However, just after radioing in about the ZANLA unit, Rich's men were set upon by mortars and small arms fire; the guerrillas had spotted them. The Rhodesian commander requested reinforcements, but was told that troops were too thinly spread to immediately assist. Laying prone in a 360-degree formation, the 2 Commando men defended their position against ZANLA fighters attacking from all sides. Late on the first day, the Rhodesians killed three of the cadres, then dragged the corpses behind their lines to avoid giving away their exact location. As the nationalist commanders did not know exactly where the RLI men were, the ZANLA mortars were being fired with little concern for accuracy. The barrage continued all night, pinning the Rhodesians down while the nationalists retook Jorge do Limpopo. At dawn on 30 May, Rich decided to stay in their pocket in the trees and await reinforcements rather than attempt a rash break-out into open enemy territory, which would surely result in their own massacre.

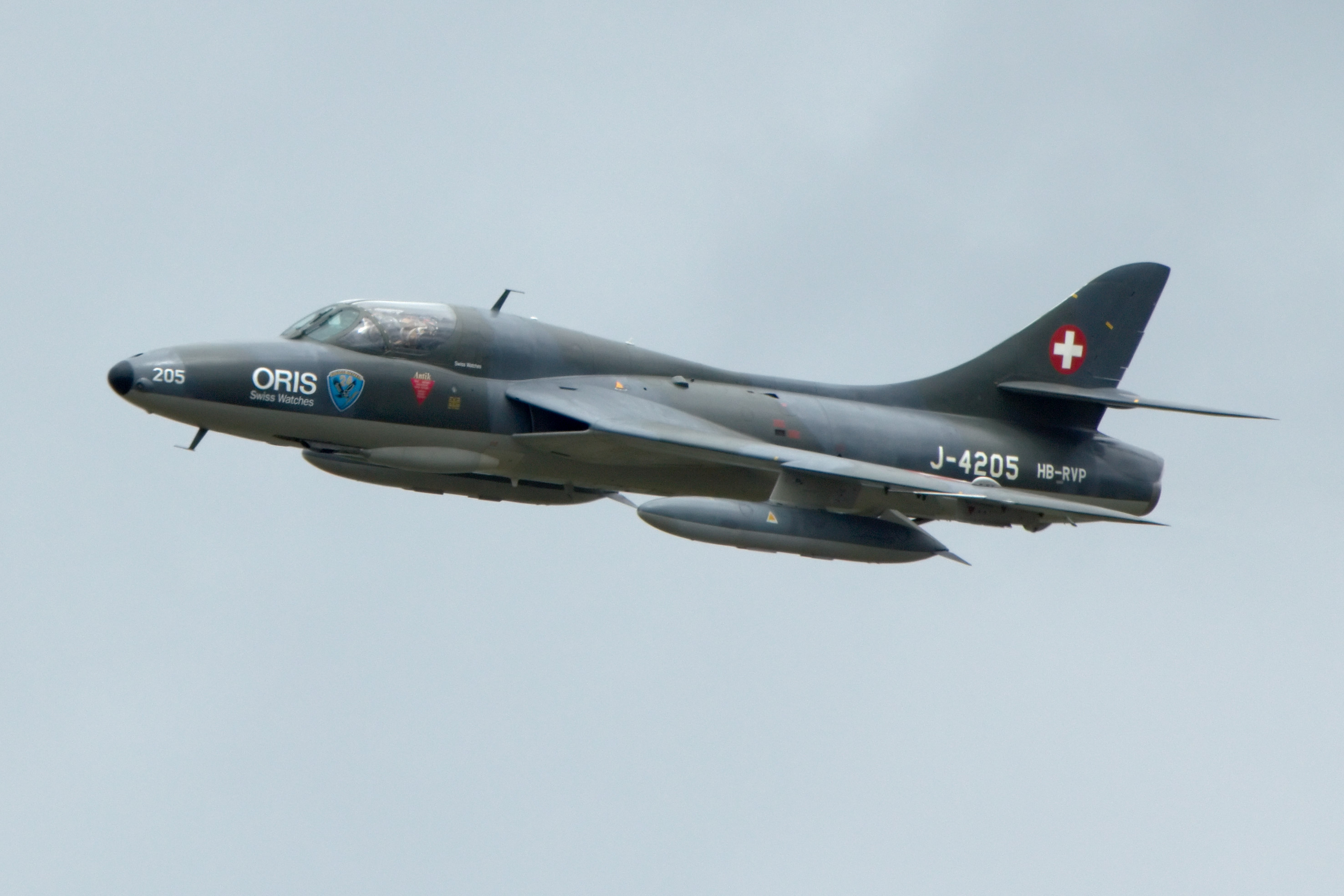
A Hawker Hunter of the Swiss Air Force. The intervention of RhAF Hunters twice proved decisive at Jorge do Limpopo during Operation Aztec.

The Rhodesians retreated further into the dark trees late on 30 May in a successful attempt to further confuse the guerrillas as to their precise position. Growing impatient, the cadres now began firing "anywhere and everywhere," in Swan's words. The RLI men kept silent to avoid giving their location away. Nationalists began coming into the trees after them, and again and again the Rhodesians held their fire until the last second before killing them and hiding their bodies. With each guerrilla attack, the 2 Commando men moved, turning the situation into one of cat and mouse. At Mapai, the column defeated a numerically superior and well-prepared FRELIMO–ZANLA force at the airstrip outside the town before resting for the night. Trooper C. J. Edmunds, who was killed during this action, was one of two Rhodesian fatalities during Operation Aztec. Rich's men were now able to call air support, which arrived minutes later in the form of Hawker Hunters, "our saviours", says Swan; the planes showered the guerrillas with SNEB rockets and 40 mm cannon fire, causing them to retreat back to Jorge do Limpopo. At Mapai, an RhAF Dakota was hit by an RPG-7 rocket while taking off at 20:00 on 30 May, killing its co-pilot, Flight Lieutenant Bruce Collocott.

The next morning, on 31 May, the Rhodesians at Mapai blew up the damaged Dakota to avoid its discovery by the United Nations, which had warned Rhodesia to keep its troops out of Mozambique. The RhAF bombed FRELIMO and ZANLA positions around Mapai at the same time just before the Scouts' flying column attacked the village and took it without significant resistance. Hidden caches of materiel were captured, as well as several Soviet-manufactured ZANLA vehicles, which were repaired and then used to carry recovered weapons and equipment. Murphy's Selous Scouts were now told to turn south and lay waste to as much of the railway as they could within a distance of 20 kilometres (12 mi) before returning. Murphy disregarded this restriction, however, wiping out railway bridges and stations as far south as Mabalane, about 75 kilometres (47 mi) away; at Mabalane, his unit destroyed the only railway steam crane in Mozambique. Meanwhile, the RLI men in the pocket near Jorge do Limpopo, though dangerously low on food, equipment and weapons, held out for two more days without loss, killing several more cadres who attempted to overrun their position. On 2 June 1977, they were relieved by the rest of 2 Commando, who were returning from Mapai with the Selous Scouts column. The RLI sped along the nearby road in armoured trucks, firing heavily upon any guerrillas they saw, and stopped near where the pocketed men were hiding. When the men in the vehicles gave the all-clear signal Rich's men, by now emaciated due to exhaustion and lack of nourishment, ran to them with the last of their strength and had to be pulled into the trucks by their comrades.

United for the first time during the operation, 2 Commando returned to Jorge do Limpopo (which the Scouts had retaken) and helped engineers plant explosives all over the town on anything the guerrillas might find useful as the Rhodesians prepared to withdraw. The Selous Scouts captured any vehicles, weapons and equipment they could find and added them to the column. Just after the troops left, the charges lain all over Jorge do Limpopo were detonated, levelling much of the town. By the time Aztec closed on 2 June 1977, at least 60 FRELIMO and ZANLA men had been killed, though Selous Scouts commanding officer Lieutenant-Colonel Ron Reid-Daly did not measure the operation's success in these terms; what he found to be important was the severe damage that had been done to ZANLA's morale and to FRELIMO's infrastructure in the region, which had been largely destroyed. The elimination of Mozambique's railway in Gaza Province, for example, harshly limited the transfer of ZANLA fighters, equipment and stores from the Mozambican ports to the Rhodesian border.

=== Operation Dingo ===
November 1977's Operation Dingo, a joint attack by the RLI and SAS on ZANLA camps in Mozambique at Chimoio and Tembue, is retrospectively described by P. J. H. Petter-Bowyer as an "astounding success". "Operation Dingo cost ZANLA in excess of 3,000 trained men and something in the order of 5,000 wounded, many too seriously to be of further use," he writes. "Others lost all interest in the fighting and deserted." From the Rhodesian side, six men were wounded and two were killed. (Note: SAS soldier Frans Nel was shot dead at Chimoio and Air Lieutenant Phil Haigh died while attempting a forced landing of his damaged Vampire fighter-bomber. While returning to base, Haigh's aircraft was damaged by ground fire, causing his engine to give out while still flying over Mozambique; rather than abandon the Vampire he glided across to attempt a forced landing on Rhodesian soil. While landing, the Vampire ran into a deep donga which wrecked the aircraft and killed Haigh.)

== Zimbabwe; dissolution ==
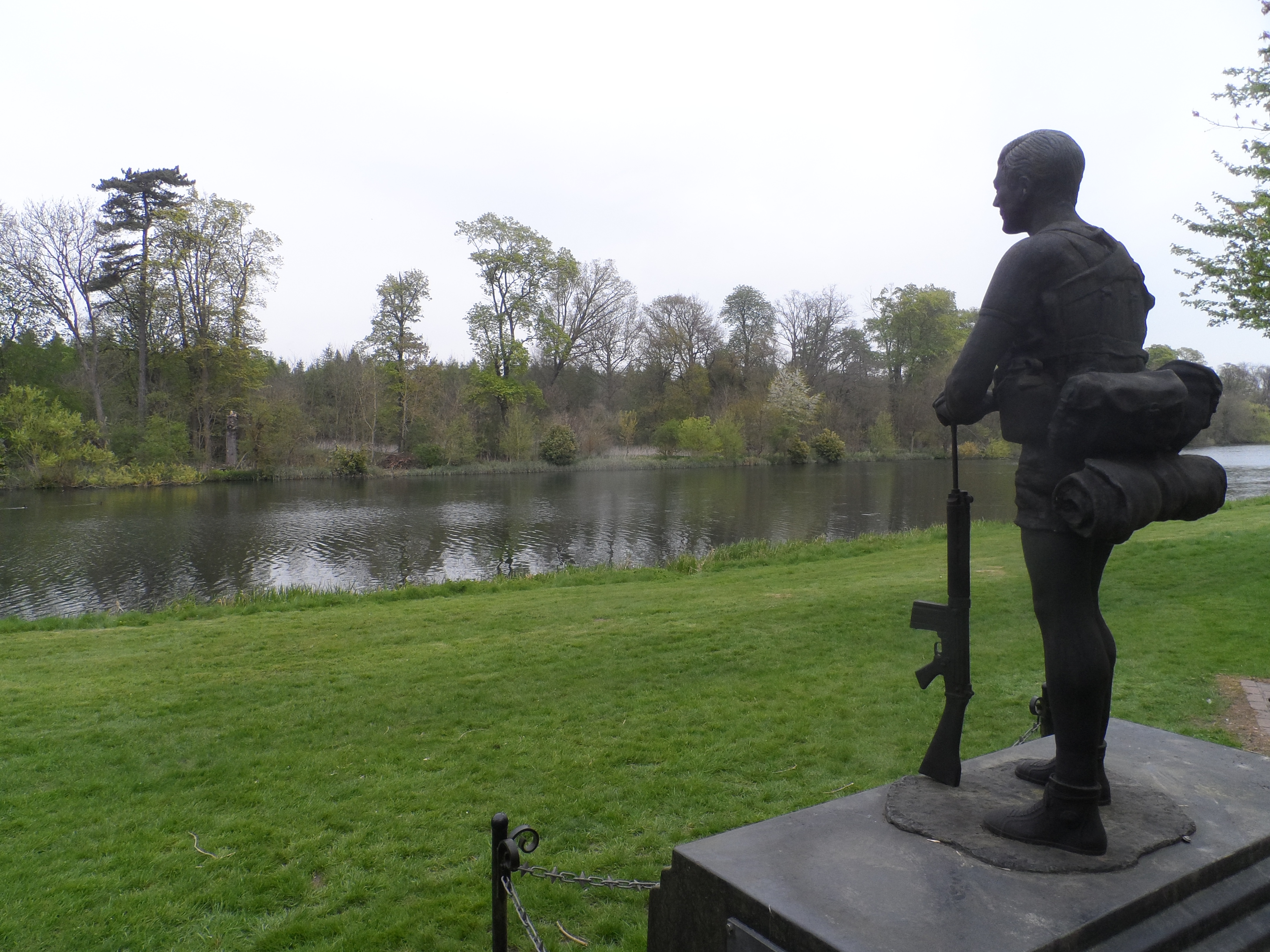
The Trooper, the RLI's regimental statue, on the grounds of Hatfield House in England in 2014

Following the country's reconstitution and recognised independence as the Republic of Zimbabwe in April 1980, the final parade of the RLI and the ceremonial laying-up of its colours took place at Cranborne Barracks on 17 October 1980. The commanding officer J. C. W. Aust, recalled being amazed by the large crowd of spectators surrounding the parade square, including the former government minister P. K. van der Byl, who attended unannounced. A Rhodesian Air Force Alouette III helicopter also arrived overhead during the ceremony and in Aust's words "circl[ed] in a moving salute and farewell". Two weeks later, the Rhodesian Light Infantry was disbanded on 31 October 1980.

A nucleus of former RLI personnel remained to train and form the First Zimbabwe Commando Battalion of the Zimbabwe National Army. The regimental statue, "The Trooper" (or "The Troopie") left Zimbabwe on 28 July 1980 on a South African Air Force C-130 Hercules, along with various Regiment records, trophies and other paraphernalia. The collection was placed in the South African National Museum of Military History in Johannesburg, and later moved to the British Empire and Commonwealth Museum in Bristol, England. The Trooper statue now stands on the grounds of Hatfield House, country seat of the Marquess of Salisbury, where it was re-dedicated on 28 September 2008.

== Notes and references ==
=== Online sources ===
- Wood, J. R. T. (24 May 1995). "Rhodesian Insurgency". Oudeschip: Allport Books.

=== Journal articles ===
- Lockley, Lt-Col R. E. H. (July 1990). "A brief operational history of the campaign in Rhodesia from 1964 to 1978". The Lion & Tusk. 2 (1). Southampton: Rhodesian Army Association. Archived from the original on 25 May 2022.
- Lohman, Major Charles M.; MacPherson, Major Robert I. (7 June 1983). "Rhodesia: Tactical Victory, Strategic Defeat" (PDF). War Since 1945 Seminar and Symposium. Quantico, Virginia: Marine Corps Command and Staff College.
- Melson, Charles D. (March 2005). "Top Secret War: Rhodesian Special Operations". Small Wars and Insurgencies. 16 (1). London: Routledge: 57–82. doi:10.1080/0959231042000322567. S2CID 145455177.
- Streak, Brian, ed. (31 October 1980). The Cheetah. Salisbury: The Rhodesian Light Infantry Regimental Association.
- Venter, A. J. (June 1979). "Rhodesia's Tragic Terrorist War: The End is Near". Soldier of Fortune. Bounder, Colorado: Omega Group: 38–43.

=== Bibliography ===
- Abbott, Peter; Botham, Philip (June 1986). Modern African Wars: Rhodesia, 1965–80. Oxford: Osprey Publishing. ISBN 978-0-85045-728-5.
- Binda, Alexandre (May 2008). The Saints: The Rhodesian Light Infantry. Johannesburg: 30° South Publishers. ISBN 978-1-920143-07-7.
- Cilliers, Jakkie (December 1984). Counter-Insurgency in Rhodesia. London, Sydney & Dover, New Hampshire: Croom Helm. ISBN 978-0-7099-3412-7.
- Cocks, Chris (June 2009) [1988]. Fireforce: One Man's War in the Rhodesian Light Infantry (Fourth ed.). Johannesburg: 30° South Publishers. ISBN 978-0-9584890-9-6.
- Croukamp, Dennis E. W. (December 2005). Only My Friends Call Me "Crouks": Rhodesian reconnaissance specialist. Cape Town: Pseudo Publishing. ISBN 978-0-620-29392-1.
- Gledhill, Dick (November 2001). One Commando: Rhodesian Light Infantry (Second ed.). Roodepoort: Covos Books. ISBN 978-1-919874-35-7.
- Grossman, Lt-Col Dave (November 1996). On Killing: The Psychological Cost of Learning to Kill in War and Society. New York: Back Bay Books. ISBN 0-316-33000-0.
- Martin, David; Johnson, Phyllis (July 1981). The Struggle for Zimbabwe (First ed.). London: Faber and Faber. ISBN 978-0-571-11066-7.
- Moorcraft, Paul L.; McLaughlin, Peter (April 2008) [1982]. The Rhodesian War: A Military History. Barnsley: Pen and Sword Books. ISBN 978-1-84415-694-8.
- Nkomo, Joshua; Harman, Nicholas (April 1984). Nkomo: The Story of My Life (First ed.). London: Methuen Publishing. ISBN 978-0-413-54500-8.
- Petter-Bowyer, P. J. H. (November 2005) [2003]. Winds of Destruction: the Autobiography of a Rhodesian Combat Pilot. Johannesburg: 30° South Publishers. ISBN 978-0-9584890-3-4.
- Preston, Matthew (September 2004). Ending civil war: Rhodesia and Lebanon in perspective. London: I.B. Tauris. ISBN 1-85043-579-0.
- Reid-Daly, Ron; Stiff, Peter (1982). Selous Scouts: Top Secret War. Alberton: Galago. ISBN 978-0-620-05771-4.
- Sibanda, Eliakim M. (January 2005). The Zimbabwe African People's Union 1961–87: A Political History of Insurgency in Southern Rhodesia. Trenton, New Jersey: Africa Research & Publications. ISBN 978-1-59221-276-7.
- Smith, Ian (June 1997). The Great Betrayal: The Memoirs of Ian Douglas Smith. London: John Blake Publishing. ISBN 1-85782-176-9.
- The South African Democracy Education Trust ("SADET") (November 2005). The Road to Democracy in South Africa, Volume 1, 1960–1970. Cape Town: Struik Publishers. ISBN 978-1-86872-906-7.
- Taylor, Stu (September 2007). Lost in Africa (First ed.). Johannesburg: 30° South Publishers. ISBN 978-1-920143-16-9.
- Thomas, Scott (December 1995). The Diplomacy of Liberation: the Foreign Relations of the ANC Since 1960 (First ed.). London: I.B. Tauris. ISBN 1-85043-993-1.
- Thompson, Leroy (October 1991). Dirty Wars: Elite Forces vs the Guerrillas (First ed.). Newton Abbot: David & Charles. ISBN 978-0-7153-9441-0.
- Wessels, Hannes (July 2010). P. K. van der Byl: African Statesman. Johannesburg: 30° South Publishers. ISBN 978-1-920143-49-7.
- Williams, Gwyneth; Hackland, Brian (July 1988). The Dictionary of Contemporary Politics of Southern Africa (First ed.). London: Routledge. ISBN 978-0-415-00245-5.
- Wood, J. R. T. (June 2005). So far and no further! Rhodesia's bid for independence during the retreat from empire 1959–1965. Victoria, British Columbia: Trafford Publishing. ISBN 978-1-4120-4952-8.
- Wood, J. R. T. (April 2008). A matter of weeks rather than months: The Impasse between Harold Wilson and Ian Smith: Sanctions, Aborted Settlements and War 1965–1969. Victoria, British Columbia: Trafford Publishing. ISBN 978-1-4251-4807-2.
- Wood, J. R. T. (July 2009). Counter-strike From the Sky: The Rhodesian All-arms Fireforce in the War in the Bush 1974–1980. Johannesburg: 30° South Publishers. ISBN 978-1-920143-33-6.

=== Further reading ===
- Bond, Geoffrey (1977). The Incredibles: The Story of the 1st Battalion, The Rhodesian Light Infantry. Salisbury: Sarum Imprint. ISBN 0-7974-0233-0.
- Coey, John Alan (March 1988). A Martyr Speaks (First ed.). Fletcher, North Carolina: New Puritan Library. ISBN 978-0-932050-41-0.
- Croukamp, Dennis E. W. (December 2005). Only My Friends Call Me "Crouks": Rhodesian reconnaissance specialist. Cape Town: Pseudo Publishing. ISBN 978-0-620-29392-1.
- Gledhill, Dick (November 2001). One Commando: Rhodesian Light Infantry (Second ed.). Roodepoort: Covos Books. ISBN 978-1-919874-35-7.
