= Railway stations in Zimbabwe =

Railway station in Beitbridge include:

== Maps ==
- UN map
- UNHCR map

== Town served ==
=== Existing ===
Bulawayo-Gaborone main line:

- Bulawayo
- Plumtree

Beira–Bulawayo railway (Machipanda railway)

- Bulawayo
- Somabhula
- Gweru
- Kadoma
- Harare
- Marondera
- Nyazura
- Mutare

Limpopo railway (Gweru-Maputo railway)

- Somabhula/Gweru
- Zvishavane
- Rutenga - junction to Beitbridge
- (Zimbabwe) Sango/Niangambe - border station
- Chicualacuala (formerly Malvernia) - border with Zimbabwe

Beitbridge Bulawayo Railway

- Esigodini
- Mbalabala
- Mazunga
- (Zimbabwe) Beitbridge - border
- (South Africa) Messina

Lowveld Railway

- Mbizi - junction
- Triangle
- Chiredzi
- Nandi - mill; terminus

=== Proposed ===
- Harare
  - (rehabilitate)
- Chinhoyi
  - (new construction 235 km)
- Chirundu - on Zambezi River
  (Zimbabwe) (Zambia)
  - (possible extension 85 km)
- (Zambia) Lusaka - capital

- (Zimbabwe) Hwange possible coal mines.
- (Mozambique) Technobanine Point near Maputo.

=== Upgrade ===
- East African Railway Master Plan

== See also ==
- Transport in Zimbabwe
- National Railways of Zimbabwe
