= Operation Aztec =

1977 Rhodesian Bush War operation

- Part of the Rhodesian Bush War (or Second Chimurenga)
- Operation Aztec (Mozambique)
Date	28 May – 2 June 1977
Location	Mapai, Mabalane, People's Republic of Mozambique 22°43′50″S 32°03′30″E
Result	Rhodesian victory

Belligerents
Rhodesia	ZANLA; Cuba

Commanders and leaders
(Rhodesia) Ian Smith; Lt. Gen Peter Walls (Rhodesia) Lt. Col Ron Reid-Daly (Rhodesia) Cap. John Murphy	(Cuba) 15 military advisors

Units involved
Rhodesian Army; (Rhodesia) Rhodesian Light Infantry; Rhodesia Regiment; (Rhodesia) Selous Scouts; RhAF; No.5 Squadron	Unknown

Strength
24 Paratroopers; 110 Selous Scouts; 4 Hawker Hunters; 4 Canberras; 3 DC-3C (Paradak); 1 Reims Cessna (Lynx)	Unknown

Casualties and losses
2 killed 1 DC-3C destroyed	60+ killed 6 vehicles destroyed (Cuba) 12 to 15 advisors killed

Operation Aztec was a military operation launched by the Republic of Rhodesia against the communist backed insurgent group ZANLA, in Mozambique from 28 May to 2 June 1977. The successful operation resulted in the destruction of Mozambique's railway in Gaza Province, limiting the movement of enemy soldiers, and equipment from Mozambique to the Rhodesian border.

== Background ==
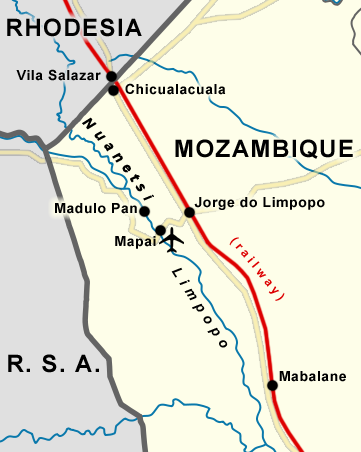
Operation Aztec, lasting from 28 May to 2 June 1977, centred around the Vila Salazar–Maputo railway.

A three-pronged Rhodesian attack on FRELIMO and ZANLA staging posts in Mozambique's Gaza Province was planned to restrict the guerrillas' infiltration into the south-east of Rhodesia, in order to deliver a decisive blow to the enemy's ability to launch incursions into Rhodesia. The 2nd Battalion, of the Rhodesia Regiment would penetrate the border of Mozambique 10 kilometres (6.2 mi) south from Vila Salazar, a small village near the corner of Mozambique, Rhodesia and South Africa, and attack a ZANLA staging camp to create a diversion. At the same time, a group of heliborne men from the Rhodesian Light Infantry would attack ZANLA's Rio base close to the Nuanetsi River while two sticks of RLI paratroopers would be dropped into Madulo Pan, a major ZANLA position near the fork of the Nuanetsi and Limpopo. The Selous Scouts would move as a flying column along the Vila Salazar–Maputo railway line and destroy all ZANLA camps between Vila Salazar and Jorge do Limpopo, a key strategic position on the railway.

== The Operation ==
The operation began on 28 May 1977, at dusk, when 72 Selous Scouts crossed the border near Vila Salazar on a bush track, dressed in FRELIMO uniforms, driving 14 FRELIMO-pattern vehicles and commanded by Major John Murphy, an American Vietnam veteran. Moving slowly because of the darkness, they reached the south-bound Chicualacuala road soon after first light, just in time to see the Rhodesian Air Force (RhAF) Canberra bombers flying over on their way to drop air strikes on Madulo Pan soon after 06:00. Two twelve-man sticks from 2 Commando, RLI sat aboard a Dakota, ready to parachute into Madulo Pan from 500 feet (150 m), led by the two stick leaders, Lance-Corporals Jimmy Swan and "Budgie" Nicholson. Just after the Canberra air strikes, the paratroopers dropped to engage any ZANLA guerrillas who remained from the 150 based there. Though parachute troops were usually the target of ground fire while in the air, this time there was none; the area was silent as 2 Commando landed. The soldiers formed up into an extended sweep line and advanced towards the camp, which had been almost completely destroyed by the Rhodesian bombing raid. Neither insurgents nor bodies were found, but the 2 Commando men did discover fresh tracks heading east, directly towards Jorge do Limpopo. The Rhodesians judged that the guerrillas must have hastily evacuated the camp, having been forewarned at short notice, and retreated towards the town.

The RLI men were then instructed to fall in near the road and await Murphy's flying column, which had nearly reached Jorge do Limpopo. The flying column was easily spotted by 2 Commando because of the manner of their advance; the extremely aggressive Scouts were firing into any position that could potentially be an ambush as they moved, sending huge plumes of dust into the air at regular intervals. The two Rhodesian forces rendezvoused, combined and drove on towards Jorge do Limpopo in the disguised vehicles. They met with scattered FRELIMO–ZANLA rocket and mortar fire when they reached the town's outskirts. The Scouts returned heavy fire, all 14 vehicles opening up their guns at the same time, while Murphy called for air support. With this in mind, he told the RLI paratroopers to advance quickly on foot and take out the anti-aircraft guns up ahead.

It was mayhem ... We ran straight at these guys who were taking cover from the Hunters that were strafing the streets with their 40 mm cannons. Jesus, what sheer power! ... It was a noise you could never forget.

— RLI Lance-Corporal Jimmy Swan recalls the assault on Jorge do Limpopo on 29 May 1977

The 24 men from 2 Commando charged the anti-aircraft positions as RhAF Hawker Hunters flew in overhead at 100 feet (30 m), strafing the FRELIMO–ZANLA lines. The guerrillas retreated into well-camouflaged foxholes as the Rhodesians moved forward. The RLI men were now joined by most of the Selous Scouts, who left their vehicles outside the town. Nearby buildings were swept for hidden guerrillas while 2 Commando bombed three bunkers, killing nine or ten FRELIMO fighters. With resistance at the town's border destroyed, the Scouts now advanced through it street by street, clearing it quickly, efficiently and ruthlessly. The Rhodesians rendezvoused at Jorge do Limpopo railway station, where the flying column's vehicles assembled. Murphy discovered that the main ZANLA base had been moved to Mapai, a village with an airstrip on the Nuanetsi River to the south-west, and diverted his force to attack it. He advised 2 Commando that three of its sticks—the two from Madulo Pan, and another—would remain to defend Jorge do Limpopo against any potential counter-attack, commanded by Lieutenant Mike Rich, while the rest of the Commando would support the Selous Scouts' advance on Mapai. When all was prepared late on the 29 thMay, Murphy enthusiastically broadcast the column's departure, waving his arms and shouting, "Tally ho and away we go!"

The men who remained at Jorge do Limpopo resolved to set up an ambush position in a patch of tall trees to the north of the town, as nowhere else nearby provided any cover. As most of the air force had now returned to Rhodesia, with the remaining helicopters supporting the column, the RLI men felt abandoned, in the open and somewhat nervous. While the soldiers quietly moved around the trees, about 50 metres (160 ft) from a road, they heard shouting ahead, and dropped to the ground to avoid being seen, facing the road in an extended line. Between 50 and 60 heavily armed ZANLA guerrillas, armed with RPD light machine-guns, RPG-7 rocket launchers and similar weapons, marched past. They were on their way to attack the flying column, and did not notice the RLI men hiding near the road. Rich decided to proceed with the plan to set up the ambush in the trees and call for assistance regarding the cadres, reasoning that attacking now would only get his men killed. However, just after radioing in about the ZANLA unit, Rich's men were set upon by mortars and small arms fire; the guerrillas had spotted them. The Rhodesian commander requested reinforcements, but was told that troops were too thinly spread to immediately assist. Laying prone in a 360-degree formation, the 2 Commando men defended their position against ZANLA fighters attacking from all sides. Late on the first day, the Rhodesians killed three of the cadres, then dragged the corpses behind their lines to avoid giving away their exact location. As the nationalist commanders did not know exactly where the RLI men were, the ZANLA mortars were being fired with little concern for accuracy. The barrage continued all night, pinning the Rhodesians down while the nationalists retook Jorge do Limpopo. At dawn on 30 May, Rich decided to stay in their pocket in the trees and await reinforcements rather than attempt a rash break-out into open enemy territory, which would surely result in their own massacre.

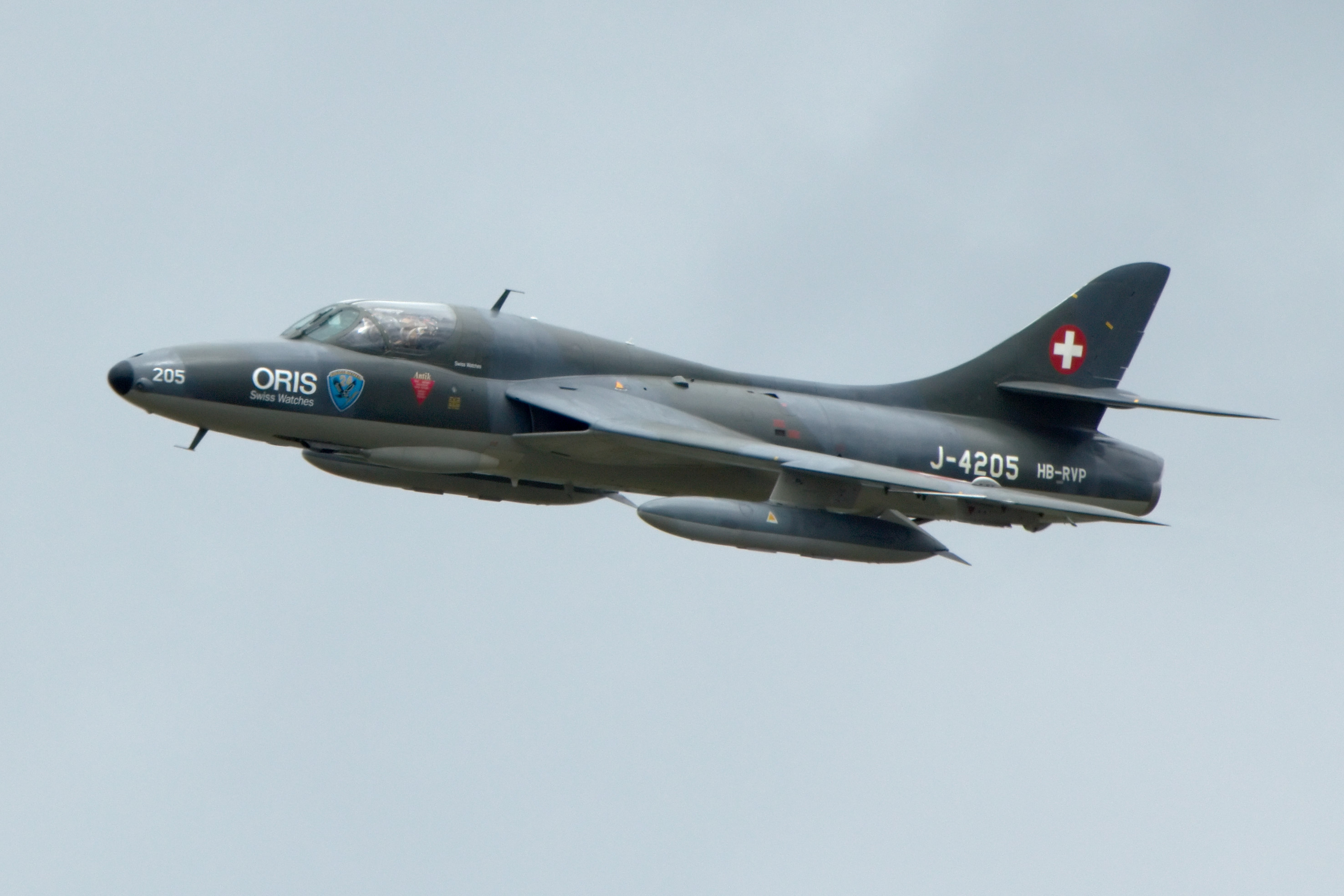
A Hawker Hunter of the Swiss Air Force. The intervention of RhAF Hunters twice proved decisive at Jorge do Limpopo during Operation Aztec.

The Rhodesians retreated further into the dark trees late on 30 May in a successful attempt to further confuse the guerrillas as to their precise position. Growing impatient, the cadres now began firing "anywhere and everywhere," in Swan's words. The RLI men kept silent to avoid giving their location away. Nationalists began coming into the trees after them, and again and again the Rhodesians held their fire until the last second before killing them and hiding their bodies. With each guerrilla attack, the 2 Commando men moved, turning the situation into one of cat and mouse. At Mapai, the column defeated a numerically superior and well-prepared FRELIMO–ZANLA force at the airstrip outside the town before resting for the night. Trooper C. J. Edmunds, who was killed during this action, was one of two Rhodesian fatalities during Operation Aztec. Rich's men were now able to call air support, which arrived minutes later in the form of Hawker Hunters, "our saviours", says Swan; the planes showered the guerrillas with SNEB rockets and 40 mm cannon fire, causing them to retreat back to Jorge do Limpopo. At Mapai, an RhAF Dakota was hit by an RPG-7 rocket while taking off at 20:00 on 30 May, killing its co-pilot, Flight Lieutenant Bruce Collocott.

The next morning, on 31 May, the Rhodesians at Mapai blew up the damaged Dakota to avoid its discovery by the United Nations, which had warned Rhodesia to keep its troops out of Mozambique. The RhAF bombed FRELIMO and ZANLA positions around Mapai at the same time just before the Scouts' flying column attacked the village and took it without significant resistance. Hidden caches of materiel were captured, as well as several Soviet-manufactured ZANLA vehicles, which were repaired and then used to carry recovered weapons and equipment. Murphy's Selous Scouts were now told to turn south and lay waste to as much of the railway as they could within a distance of 20 kilometres (12 mi) before returning. Murphy disregarded this restriction, however, wiping out railway bridges and stations as far south as Mabalane, about 75 kilometres (47 mi) away; at Mabalane, his unit destroyed the only railway steam crane in Mozambique. Meanwhile, the RLI men in the pocket near Jorge do Limpopo, though dangerously low on food, equipment and weapons, held out for two more days without loss, killing several more cadres who attempted to overrun their position. On 2 June 1977, they were relieved by the rest of 2 Commando, who were returning from Mapai with the Selous Scouts column. The RLI sped along the nearby road in armoured trucks, firing heavily upon any guerrillas they saw, and stopped near where the pocketed men were hiding. When the men in the vehicles gave the all-clear signal Rich's men, by now emaciated due to exhaustion and lack of nourishment, ran to them with the last of their strength and had to be pulled into the trucks by their comrades.

== Aftermath ==
By the time Aztec closed on 2 June 1977, at least 60 FRELIMO and ZANLA men had been killed, though Selous Scouts commanding officer Lieutenant-Colonel Ron Reid-Daly did not measure the operation's success in these terms. Instead what Lieutenant-Colonel Ronald Reid-Daly found to be the most important was the severe damage that had been inflicted upon ZANLA's morale and to FRELIMO's infrastructure in the region, which had been mostly destroyed. The destruction of Mozambique's railway in Gaza Province, limited the transfer of ZANLA fighters, and equipment from the Mozambican ports to the Rhodesian border.
