= Vila Salazar =

Vila Salazar may refer to:

- N'dalatando, Angola (the former official name of the city is ‘Vila Salazar’)
- Sango, Zimbabwe (the former official name of the village is ‘Vila Salazar’)
- Baucau, East Timor (the former official name of the city is ‘Vila Salazar’)
