= Alcora =

Alcora may refer to:

- L'Alcora, a municipality in the Valencian Community, Spain
- Alcora Exercise, cooperation between Portugal, South Africa and Rhodesia in the early 1970s
