= Rhodesian Bush War =

1964–1979 conflict in Southern Africa

- Part of the Cold War and decolonisation of Africa
- The geopolitical situation after the independence of Angola and Mozambique in 1975. Rhodesia South Africa and South West Africa States giving governmental support to the guerrillas (Frontline States)
Date	4 July 1964 – 12 December 1979 (Note: The start and end of the war are difficult to precisely date. Dates which can be considered the beginning include 4 July 1964, when ZANU insurgents killed Petrus Oberholzer; 11 November 1965, when Rhodesia issued its Unilateral Declaration of Independence; 28 April 1966, the date of a contact between ZANU cadres and the British South Africa Police near Sinoia; and 21 December 1972, when ZANLA attacked Altena Farm in north-eastern Rhodesia, marking the start of the war in earnest. Zimbabwe's modern ruling party, ZANU–PF, considers the third of these dates official and refers to the contact as the Battle of Sinoia. The end of the war is generally placed at 12 December 1979, when the country fell under interim UK control following the Lancaster House Agreement.) (15 years, 5 months, 1 week and 1 day)
Location	Rhodesia, Zimbabwe-Rhodesia (now Zimbabwe) (Note: The name of the country equivalent to modern Zimbabwe changed numerous times during the war. The Southern Rhodesian government announced in October 1964 that it would simply become Rhodesia when Northern Rhodesia changed its name to Zambia, but the UK refused to grant assent to this, ruling that it was beyond the powers of the colonial government to change the country's name. The colonial government continued using the shortened name anyway, declared independence as Rhodesia, and used that name until becoming Zimbabwe Rhodesia in June 1979.); Zambia; Mozambique; Botswana
Result	Lancaster House Agreement: Military stalemate; ZANU/ZAPU political victory; Commonwealth Monitoring Force deployed to Rhodesia to supervise elections.
Territorial changes	Rhodesia renamed; Zimbabwe gains internationally recognised independence

Belligerents
Southern Rhodesia (1964–1965); Rhodesia (1965–1979); Zimbabwe Rhodesia (1979); Portugal (1964–1974) (Note: Until the Carnation Revolution. Portuguese forces assisted the Rhodesians in cross-border operations into Portuguese Mozambique. See Operation Flotilla and Operation Birch.); South Africa (from 1967)	ZANU (ZANLA); ZAPU (ZIPRA); (People's Republic of Mozambique) Mozambique; ANC (MK); Zambia

Commanders and leaders
(Rhodesia) Ian Smith; (Rhodesia) P. K. van der Byl; (Rhodesia) Peter Walls; (Rhodesia) Mick McLaren; (Rhodesia) Frank Mussell; (Rhodesia) Norman Walsh; (Rhodesia) Ken Flower; (Rhodesia) Andrew Rawlins; (Rhodesia) Keith Coster; (Zimbabwe Rhodesia) Abel Muzorewa; (Zimbabwe Rhodesia) Ndabaningi Sithole (Note: From March 1978. Previously leader of ZANU.); (Zimbabwe Rhodesia) James Chikerema (Note: From March 1978. Previously leader of ZAPU.); (South Africa) B. J. Vorster; (South Africa) P. W. Botha; (Estado Novo (Portugal)) Kaúlza de Arriaga	Robert Mugabe; Herbert Chitepo X; Josiah Tongogara; Eddison Zvobgo; Ndabaningi Sithole (Note: Until 1975.); Edgar Tekere; Solomon Mujuru; Joshua Nkomo; James Chikerema (Note: Until October 1971.); Jason Moyo X; Lookout Masuku; Dumiso Dabengwa; (People's Republic of Mozambique) Samora Machel; Oliver Tambo; Joe Slovo

Strength
(Rhodesia) 1979: 10,800 regulars; 15,000 reservists; 9,000 police; 19,000 police reservists; 52,800 total force	1979: 25,500 guerrillas; 1979: 20,000 guerrillas; 45,500 total guerillas

Casualties and losses
2,616 killed	c. 10,000 killed
- c. 20,000 people killed overall

The Rhodesian Bush War, also known as the Rhodesian Civil War, the Second Chimurenga or the Zimbabwe War of Independence, was a civil conflict from July 1964 to December 1979 in the unrecognised state of Rhodesia (later the temporary British colony of Zimbabwe-Rhodesia, and now the independent Zimbabwe).

The conflict pitted three forces against one another: the Rhodesian white minority-led government of Ian Smith (later the Zimbabwe-Rhodesian government of Bishop Abel Muzorewa); militant African guerillas organisations such as the Zimbabwe African National Liberation Army (ZANLA), the military wing of Robert Mugabe's Zimbabwe African National Union (ZANU); and the Zimbabwe People's Revolutionary Army of Joshua Nkomo's Zimbabwe African People's Union (ZAPU).

The war and its subsequent Internal Settlement, signed in 1978 by Smith and Muzorewa, led to the implementation of universal suffrage in June 1979 and the end of white minority rule in Rhodesia, which was renamed Zimbabwe Rhodesia under a black majority government. However, this new order failed to win international recognition and the war continued. Neither side achieved a military victory and a compromise was later reached.

Negotiations between the government of Zimbabwe-Rhodesia, the government of the United Kingdom, and Mugabe and Nkomo's united "Patriotic Front" took place at Lancaster House, London in December 1979, and the Lancaster House Agreement was signed. The country returned temporarily to British control and new elections were held under British and Commonwealth supervision in March 1980. ZANU won the election and Mugabe became the first Prime Minister of Zimbabwe on 18 April 1980, when the country achieved internationally recognised independence.

== Background ==
The origin of the war in Rhodesia can be traced to the conquest of the region by the British South Africa Company in the late 19th century, and the dissent of native leaders who opposed foreign rule. Britons began settling in Southern Rhodesia in the 1890s, and while it was never accorded full dominion status, these settlers effectively governed the country after 1923.

In his famous "Wind of Change" speech, UK Prime Minister Harold Macmillan revealed Britain's new policy to only permit independence to its African colonies under majority rule. But many white Rhodesians were concerned that such immediate change would cause chaos as had resulted in the former Belgian Congo after its independence in 1960.

Britain's unwillingness to compromise led to Rhodesia's unilateral declaration of independence (UDI) on 11 November 1965. Although Rhodesia had the private support of neighbouring South Africa and Portugal, which still governed Mozambique, it never gained diplomatic recognition from any country.

Although the vote in Rhodesia was constitutionally open regardless of race, property requirements left many Black Africans unable to participate. The new 1969 constitution reserved eight seats in the 66 seat parliament for "Non-Europeans" only, with a further eight reserved for tribal chiefs.

Amidst this backdrop, African nationalists advocated armed struggle to bring about black rule, primarily denouncing the wealth disparity between the races. Two rival nationalist organisations emerged in August 1963: the Zimbabwe African People's Union (ZAPU) and the Zimbabwe African National Union (ZANU), after disagreements about tactics, as well as tribalism and personality clashes. ZANU and its military wing ZANLA were headed by Robert Mugabe and consisted primarily of Shona tribes. ZAPU and its military wing ZIPRA consisted mainly of Ndebele under Joshua Nkomo.

=== Cold War politics ===
Cold War politics played into the conflict. The Soviet Union supported ZIPRA and China supported ZANLA. Each group fought a separate war against the Rhodesian Security Forces, and the two groups sometimes fought against each other as well. In June 1979, the governments of Cuba and Mozambique offered direct military help to the Patriotic Front, but Mugabe and Nkomo declined. Other foreign contributions included military officials from North Korea, who taught Zimbabwean militants to use explosives and arms in a camp near Pyongyang. By April 1979, 12,000 ZANLA guerrillas were training in Tanzania, Ethiopia, and Libya while 9,500 of its 13,500 extant cadres operated in Rhodesia. South Africa clandestinely gave material and military support to the Rhodesian government.

The Rhodesian Front (RF)—the ruling party—took an uncompromising position against the communist ideology of the ZIPRA and ZANLA. Ian Smith further expounded this by portraying the conflict as primarily anti-communist in nature. The Rhodesian whites viewed the British demand for majority rule as a direct attack on their way of life. Having previously witnessed the Mau Mau Rebellion, Rhodesians refused to allow the majority-rule policy to come into effect. Much of the Rhodesian economy as well as the land was controlled by white Rhodesians, and, fearing total confiscation by either the ZIPRA or ZANLA, the RF elected to hold onto unofficial minority-rule. In ignoring other contributing factors to the conflict, Smith and the RF were able to strengthen ties with the West, but Britain remained neutral. The division between the communists and anti-communists caused the fighting to spill over the Rhodesian borders. Neighbouring African nations, supported primarily by North Korea, China, and the Soviet Union, used communist material support to begin launching guerrilla attacks on the RSF and on Rhodesian civilians and infrastructure.

The United States took the official position that it would not recognise Rhodesia as an independent state, but some American soldiers who had seen combat in Vietnam joined the Rhodesian Security Forces. The Rhodesian government created advertising campaigns in order to attract soldiers from Western countries, and the security forces amassed a force of nearly 1,400 soldiers who were highly trained in special forces and guerrilla warfare, bringing the total of the Rhodesian military force to over 10,000 men.

The Soviet Union became involved in the Rhodesian Bush War to combat the push from the anti-communist West and to challenge the Chinese presence in the region. Soviet military technology quickly appeared in the Zimbabwean countryside and by 1979 ZIPRA were utilizing SAM weaponry to target Rhodesian civilian assets and Viscount aircraft. Just as they had done in various other African countries and conflicts, the Soviets supported opposition forces with weapons and training. Moscow also launched a propaganda campaign exaggerating British involvement in the conflict in order to boost support for intervention. The Soviets were large suppliers of munitions and training, but refused to directly enter the conflict. The Chinese, on the other hand, were limited in their abilities to offer tangible aid to the ZANLA. Chinese influence throughout the conflict was primarily focused on small scale sabotage efforts and anti-western propaganda.

Because the Bush War occurred within the context of regional Cold War in Africa, it inevitably became embroiled in conflicts in several neighbouring countries. Such conflicts included the Angolan War of Independence (1961–1975) and Angolan Civil War (1975–2002), the Mozambican War of Independence (1964–1974) and Mozambican Civil War (1977–1992), the South African Border War (1966–1989), and the Shaba I (1977) and Shaba II (1978) conflicts.

=== Perceptions ===
The conflict was seen by the nationalist groups and the UK government of the time as a war of national and racial liberation. The Rhodesian government saw the conflict as a fight between one part of the country's population (the Whites) on behalf of the whole population (including the Black majority) against several externally financed parties made up of predominantly Black radicals and communists. The Nationalists considered their country occupied and dominated by a foreign power, namely Britain, since 1890.

The British government, in the person of the governor, had indirectly ruled the country from 1923, when it took over from the British South Africa Company and granted self-governing status to a locally elected government, made up predominantly of Whites. Ian Smith's Rhodesian Front party was elected to power in 1962 and unilaterally declared independence on 11 November 1965 to preserve what it saw as the self-government it had possessed since 1923.

The Rhodesian government contended that it was defending Western values, Christianity, the rule of law, and democracy by fighting Communists, but it was unwilling to compromise on most political, economic and social inequalities. White Rhodesians typically believed that black grievances were not organic and endogenous in origin but were externally fomented by foreign agitators. The Smith administration claimed that the legitimate voice of the black Shona and Ndebele population were the traditional chiefs, not the ZANU and ZAPU nationalists, whom it regarded as dangerous, violent usurpers.

In 1978–1979, the Smith administration tried to blunt the power of the nationalist cause by acceding to an "Internal Settlement" which ended minority rule, changed the name of the country to Zimbabwe-Rhodesia, and arranged multiracial elections, which were held in 1979 and won by Bishop Abel Muzorewa, who became the country's first Black head of government. Unsatisfied with this and spurred on by Britain's refusal to recognise the new order, the nationalist forces persisted.

The war ended when, at the behest of both South Africa (its major supporter) and the United States, the Zimbabwe-Rhodesian government ceded power to Britain in the Lancaster House Agreement in December 1979. The UK Government held another election in 1980 to form a new government. The election was won by ZANU. The new government, headed by Robert Mugabe, was recognised internationally, and the country was renamed Zimbabwe.

== Belligerents ==
=== Rhodesian Security Forces ===
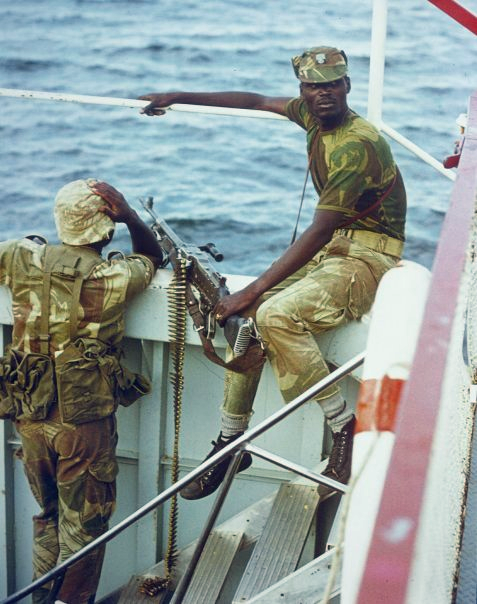
Two soldiers of the Rhodesian African Rifles aboard a patrol boat on Lake Kariba, December 1976. Black Rhodesians made up most of the government's Security Forces.

Despite the effect of economic and diplomatic sanctions, Rhodesia developed and maintained a powerful and professional military. In June 1977, Time magazine reported that "man for man, the Rhodesian army ranks among the world's finest fighting units."

The army was always relatively small, just 3,400 regular troops in 1970. By 1978–79 it had grown to some 10,800 regulars nominally supported by about 40,000 reservists – although by the last year of the war, perhaps as few as 15,000 were available for active service. While the regular army consisted of a professional core of white soldiers (and some units, such as the Rhodesian SAS and the Rhodesian Light Infantry, were all-white), by 1978–1979 the rest was majority black such as the Rhodesian African Rifles.

By contrast, army reserves were largely white, and toward the end of the war were increasingly called up to deal with the growing insurgency. The Rhodesia Regiment operated six territorial battalions and several independent companies. The regular army was supported by the paramilitary British South Africa Police of about 8,000 to 11,000 men (the majority of whom were black) and 19,000 to 35,000 police reservists (which, like their army counterparts, were largely white). The police reserves acted as a type of home guard.

The war saw the extensive operation of Rhodesian regulars as well as special forces units such as the Selous Scouts and the Rhodesian SAS. The Rhodesian Army fought bitterly against the black nationalist guerrillas. The Rhodesian Army also comprised mostly black regiments such as the Rhodesian African Rifles. As the war went on, the frequent call-up of reservists was increasingly used to supplement the professional soldiers and the many volunteers from overseas.

By 1978, all white men up to the age of 60 were subject to periodic call-up to the army; younger men up to 35 might expect to spend alternating blocks of six weeks in the army and at home. Many of the overseas volunteers came from Britain, Ireland, South Africa, Portugal, Hong Kong, Canada, Australia, New Zealand and the United States, with the latter three being held in high regard for their recent Vietnam War experience.

Considering the arms embargo, the Rhodesian Army was well-equipped. The standard infantry weapon was the Belgian FN FAL rifle as produced in South Africa under license as the R1 rifle and supplemented by the H&K G3 rifle that came from Portuguese forces. However, other weapons such as the British L1A1 ('SLR') variant of the FAL and the older British Lee–Enfield bolt-action rifle were used by reservists and the British South Africa Police. Other weapons included the Bren LMG in both .303" and 7.62mm NATO, Sten SMG, Uzi, Browning Hi-Power pistol, Colt M16 rifle (very late in the war), FN MAG (FN MAG58) general-purpose machine-gun, 81 mm mortar, and Claymore mines. After UDI, Rhodesia was heavily reliant on South African and domestically produced weapons and equipment, as well as international smuggling operations, commonly referred to as "sanction-busting". South Africa provided extensive support to Rhodesia in the form of a Lend / Lease program and both the official and unofficial support of many branches of the South African armed forces.

The Rhodesian Air Force (RhAF) operated a variety of equipment and carried out numerous roles, with air power providing the Rhodesians with a significant advantage over their guerrilla enemy. The fleet consisted mainly of British aircraft and largely obsolete aircraft, such as the World War II vintage Douglas Dakota transport aircraft and the British de Havilland Vampire. The arms embargo caused a lack of spare parts from external suppliers and RhAF had to find alternative means to keep its aircraft flying. The larger South African Air Force provided extensive training, aircraft and aircrews in support of RhAF operations from 1966. The Rhodesians also used more modern types of aircraft like the Hawker Hunter and Canberra bombers, the Cessna Skymaster as well as Aérospatiale Alouette III (SA316) helicopters until they were supplemented by the Agusta Bell 205. Very late in the war, the Rhodesian forces were able to smuggle and use a few Agusta Bell UH-1 Iroquois helicopters.

At the beginning of the war, much of Rhodesia's military hardware was of British and Commonwealth origin at first, but during the course of the conflict, new equipment such as Eland armoured cars were procured from South Africa. Several Polish-made T-55 tanks destined for Idi Amin's regime in Uganda were diverted to Rhodesia by the South Africans, in the last year of the war. The Rhodesians also produced a wide range of wheeled mine-proofed armoured vehicles, often using Mercedes Unimog, Land Rover and Bedford truck components, including unlicensed copies of the Mercedes-Benz UR-416.

It was also reported that the Rhodesian government used the Grey Wolves of the MHP from Turkey as mercenaries.

During the course of the war, most white citizens carried personal weapons, and it was not unusual to see white housewives carrying submachine guns. A siege mentality set in and all civilian transport had to be escorted in convoys for safety against ambushes. Farms and villages in rural areas were frequently attacked by guerrillas.

The Rhodesian government divided the country into eight geographical operational areas: North West Border (Operation Ranger), Eastern Border (Operation Thrasher), North East Border (Operation Hurricane), South East Border (Operation Repulse), Midlands (Operation Grapple), Kariba (Operation Splinter), Matabeleland (Operation Tangent), Salisbury and District ("SALOPS").

=== African guerrilla forces ===
The two major armed groups campaigning against Ian Smith's government were the Zimbabwe African National Liberation Army (ZANLA), the armed wing of the Zimbabwe African National Union (ZANU), and the Zimbabwe People's Revolutionary Army (ZIPRA), the armed wing of the Zimbabwe African People's Union (ZAPU). The fighting was largely rural, as the two rival movements tried to win peasant support and to recruit fighters while attacking the local government administration and white civilians. To ensure local domination, ZANLA and ZIPRA sometimes fought against each other as well as against the security forces.

==== ZANLA ====
ZANLA was the armed wing of ZANU. The organisation also had strong links with Mozambique's independence movement, FRELIMO. ZANLA, in the end, was present on a more or less permanent basis in over half the country, as evidenced by the location of the demobilisation bases at the end of the war, which were in every province except Matabeleland North. They were also fighting a civil war against ZIPRA, despite the formation of a joint front by their political parties after 1978. It was ZANLA's intention to occupy the ground, supplant the administration in rural areas, and then mount the final conventional campaign. ZANLA concentrated on the politicisation of the rural areas using force, persuasion, ties of kinship and collaboration with spirit mediums.

ZANLA tried to paralyse the Rhodesian effort and economy by planting Soviet anti-tank land mines on the roads. From 1972 to 1980 there were 2,504 vehicle detonations of land mines (mainly Soviet TM46s), killing 632 people and injuring 4,410. Mining of roads increased 133.7% from 1978 (894 mines were detonated or recovered equivalent to 2.44 mines per day) to 1979 (2,089 mines or 5.72 mines a day).

In response, the Rhodesians co-operated with the South Africans to develop a range of mine protected vehicles. They began by replacing air in tires with water which absorbed some of the blast and reduced the heat of the explosion. Initially, they protected the bodies with steel deflector plates, sandbags and mine conveyor belting. Later, purpose built vehicles with V-shaped blast hulls dispersed the blast and deaths in such vehicles became unusual events. (Note: These developments subsequently led to the South African Hippo, Casspir, Mamba and Nyala wheeled light troop carriers.)

==== ZIPRA ====
ZIPRA was the anti-government force based around the Ndebele ethnicity, led by Joshua Nkomo, and the ZAPU political organisation. In contrast to ZANLA's Mozambique links, Nkomo's ZIPRA was more oriented towards Zambia for local bases. However, this was not always with full Zambian government support: by 1979, the combined forces based in Zambia of ZIPRA, Umkhonto we Sizwe (the armed wing of the African National Congress of South Africa) and South-West African SWAPO fighters were a major threat to Zambia's internal security. Because ZAPU's political strategy relied more heavily on negotiations than armed force, ZIPRA grew slower and less elaborately than ZANLA, but by 1979 it had an estimated 20,000 combatants, almost all based in camps around Lusaka, Zambia.

ZIPRA was responsible for two attacks on civilian Air Rhodesia Viscount aeroplanes, on 3 September 1978 and 12 February 1979. Using SA-7 surface-to-air missiles, the guerrillas shot down each plane during its ascent from Kariba Airport. ZIPRA took advice from its Soviet instructors in formulating its vision and strategy of popular revolution. About 1,400 Soviet, 700 East German and 500 Cuban instructors were deployed to the area.

On the advice of the Soviets, ZIPRA built up its conventional forces, and motorised with Soviet armoured vehicles and small aeroplanes, in Zambia. ZIPRA's (i.e. ZAPU's) intention was to allow ZANLA to bring the Rhodesian forces to the point of defeat, and then take the victory from the much lighter forces of ZANLA and the essentially defeated Rhodesians. ZIPRA kept a light presence within Rhodesia, reconnoitring, keeping contact with the peasants and sometimes skirmishing with ZANLA.

ZIPRA's conventional threat partly distracted Rhodesian forces from fighting ZANLA. By the late 1970s, ZIPRA had developed a strategy known as Storming the Heavens to launch a conventional invasion from Zambia, supported by a few armoured vehicles and light aircraft. An operation by the Rhodesian armed forces to destroy a ZIPRA base near Livingstone in Zambia was never launched.

The ZAPU/ZIPRA strategy for taking over Zimbabwe proved unsuccessful. In any event, the transfer of power to black nationalists took place not by the military take-over expected by ZAPU/ZIPRA, but by a peaceful and internationally supervised election. Rhodesia reverted to British rule as the colony of Southern Rhodesia (the UK had never recognised Rhodesia's declaration of independence) and a general election took place in early 1980, supervised by British and other international forces.

Robert Mugabe (of ZANLA/ZANU) won this election, because he was the only major competitor of the majority ethnicity, Shona. Once in power, Mugabe was internationally recognised as Zimbabwe's leader and was installed as head of government, and had the backing of the overwhelming majority ethnic group. He was therefore able to quickly and irreversibly consolidate his power, forcing ZAPU, and therefore ZIPRA which was ZAPU's army, to give up hope of taking over the country in the place of ZANU/ZANLA.

=== Female Combatants in Zimbabwean Liberation Groups ===
ZANU and ZAPU both recruited women into their armed wings, ZANLA and ZIPRA. Female members held positions in logistics support, transportation, and sometimes combat. Inside both ZANLA and ZIPRA, women occupied new roles considered non-traditional in Zimbabwean life. Of these positions, they mostly occupied support roles, like carrying weapons into Rhodesia. According to ZANLA, 25–30% of its fighting force was female at the time of independence. Female members were promoted to high-ranking positions, with some even taking command over male troops. Within liberation forces, there were better established norms of equality, which gave women more rights and responsibilities than in pre-war Zimbabwean life. This being said, the mistreatment of female members, especially new-recruits, wasn't uncommon.

Historians primarily cite the need for manpower as the reason for the recruitment of female fighters. However, the greater equality granted to women in the two liberation groups was also partially caused by the influence of the USSR on ZIPRA, and of China on ZANLA. During the second phase of the war, when these organizations began to receive aid and training from the USSR and China, they adopted Maoist Communism (ZANLA) and Marxist-Leninist Communism (ZIPRA). These ideologies advocated for the liberation of oppressed people, a category that included women, leading to greater acceptance of female members within the liberation moment. The uniforms provided by the USSR and China were identical for women and men, and served to hide the differences between their bodies. Additionally, all individuals addressed one another as comrades, as opposed to with a gendered greeting. These gender neutralizing practices put concerns over social issues on the back burner, and in turn gave women opportunities to occupy new positions.

==== Post Independence Consequences ====
The involvement of female participants in pro-independence forces created new opportunities for women in Zimbabwean politics post-independence. Their inclusion brought some incremental improvements in the political and social status for Zimbabwean women. These initial changes paved the way for progress later on, like the Legal Age of Majority Act, which gave women the right to hold public and civil offices, and rendered men and women equally eligible for those positions. Additionally, the Zimbabwe Women's Bureau (1978) expanded its operations after 1980 to educate and empower women—particularly in rural areas—through research, publications, and community programs focused on economic, social, and political rights. The war brought about conditions that challenged the gender norms in Zimbabwe's culture, and gave women new options with which to gain power.

=== Foreign involvement ===
Both sides of the Cold War were involved in the Rhodesian Bush War.

The Soviet Union supported ZIPRA and China supported ZANLA. Each group fought a separate war against the RSF, and the two groups sometimes fought against each other as well.

The Soviet Union became involved in the Rhodesian Bush War to combat the push from the anti-communist West and to challenge the Chinese presence in the region. Soviet military technology quickly appeared in the Zimbabwean countryside and by 1979 ZIPRA were utilizing SAM weaponry to target Rhodesian civilian assets and Viscount aircraft. Just as they had done in various other African countries and conflicts, the Soviets supported opposition forces with weapons and training. Moscow also launched a propaganda campaign exaggerating British involvement in the conflict in order to boost support for intervention. The Soviets were large suppliers of munitions and training, but refused to directly enter the conflict.

Notebooks taken from political officers attached to insurgent groups, as well as uniforms and weaponry from the Eastern bloc confirmed Russian and Chinese sponsorship and ideology. This was further substantiated by the apprehension of a KGB general by Rhodesian troops during the pre-emptive strike to the ZANLA operated base at "New Farm" at Chimoio, Mozambique in November 1977.

ZAPU's strategy shifted to plans for conventional warfare in 1977–79, backed by Soviet logistical guidance and Cuban training of 6,000 ZIPRA in batches of 2,000 from 1977 onwards at Boma and Lupea (formerly Vila Luso) in eastern Angola.

Concurrently, the ZANU army, based principally in Mozambique, relied increasingly upon the People's Republic of China, and Maoist strategies of mobilization and revolutionary warfare. By 1976, Ethiopia, Yugoslavia and Romania were also offering more training facilities to ZANU.

During the war, Israel's government declared its support for Rhodesia and cultivated material ties. Israel gave Rhodesia the right to produce its own Uzis alongside material shipments. This resulted in the Uzi becoming standard in the Rhodesian army, police, and its white citizens. Helicopters provided by Israel to Rhodesia were also used in counter-insurgency operations. These counter-insurgency operations were based on Israeli tactics, as Israeli companies were used to construct a 500-mile belt of landmines along the border of Mozambique and Zambia.

In the United States, a political alliance of segregationists and the nascent Religious Right spread propaganda supporting Rhodesia, helped to recruit Americans to join and fight in Rhodesia's military through magazines such as Soldier of Fortune, and unsuccessfully lobbied the United States government to officially recognise Rhodesia's sovereignty.

== Pre-war events ==
=== Civil disobedience (1957–1964) ===
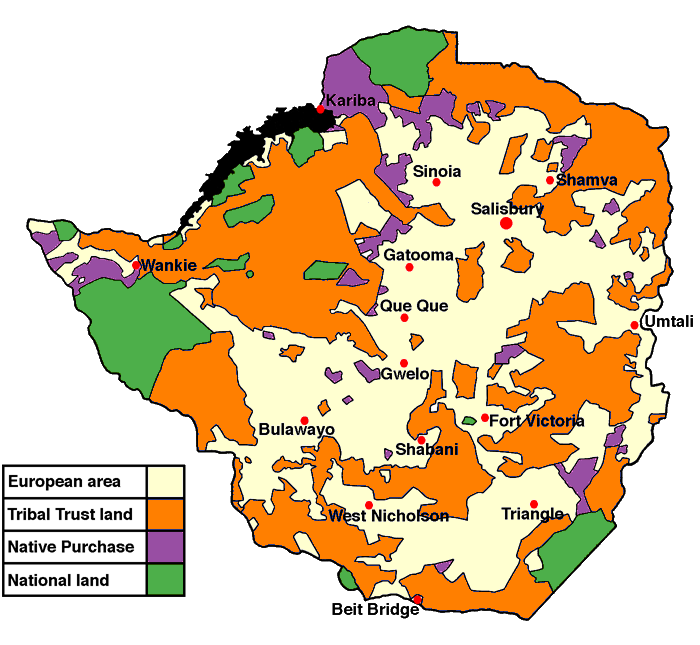
In 1962, Rhodesia was split about equally between black (orange and purple) and white (yellow) areas; however, the population was 95% black and 5% white. The ruling United Federal Party proposed the removal of some racially defined boundaries.

In September 1956, bus fares in Salisbury were raised so high that workers were spending 18% to 30% of their earnings on transportation. In response, the City Youth League boycotted the United Transport Company's buses and succeeded in preventing the price change. On 12 September 1957 members of the Youth League and the defunct ANC formed the Southern Rhodesia African National Congress, led by Joshua Nkomo. The Whitehead administration banned the SRANC in 1959 and arrested 307 leaders, excluding Nkomo who was out of the country, on 29 February in Operation Sunrise.

Nkomo, Mugabe, Herbert Chitepo, and Ndabaningi Sithole established the National Democratic Party in January 1960. Nkomo became its leader in October. An NDP delegation headed by Nkomo attended the constitutional conference in January 1961. Nkomo initially supported the constitution, but reversed his position after other NDP leaders disagreed. The government banned the NDP in December 1961 and arrested NDP leaders, excluding Nkomo who, again, was out of the country. Nkomo formed the Zimbabwe African People's Union which the Whitehead administration banned in September 1962.

The United Federal Party (UFP) had been in power since 1934, earning it the nickname of "the establishment", and roughly represented Southern Rhodesian commercial and major agricultural interests. The UFP contested the 1962 general election on a ticket of racial "partnership", whereby blacks and whites would work together. All ethnically discriminatory legislation would be immediately repealed, including the Land Apportionment Act, which defined certain areas of the land as eligible for purchase only by blacks, others as exclusively for whites, and others as open for all races.

About 45% of the country was split in this way; another 45% comprised reserved Tribal Trust Lands (TTL), which housed tribesmen, and gave local chiefs and headmen a degree of self-government in a similar manner to American Indian reservations. The remainder was national land. The country had originally been split up in this way during the early days of white immigration to prevent the new arrivals from using their superior finances to buy all of the land in the country.

The UFP proposed to repeal the black and white purchase areas, but keep the Tribal Trust and national lands. It also committed to general black advancement. These proposals proved largely repugnant to the mostly white electorate, which feared that premature black ascendancy would threaten Rhodesia's economic prosperity and security, as well as their own personal affairs.

Most turned away from the ruling UFP party, causing it to lose in the 1962 election to the newly formed Rhodesian Front (RF), a conservative party opposed to any immediate shift to black rule. Winston Field and Ian Smith became prime minister and Deputy Prime Minister, respectively. Nkomo, legally barred from forming a new party, moved ZAPU's headquarters to Dar es Salaam, Tanzania.

In July 1963, Nkomo suspended Ndabaningi Sithole, Robert Mugabe, Leopold Takawira, and Washington Malianga for their opposition to his continued leadership of ZAPU. On 8 August, they announced the establishment of the Zimbabwe African National Union. ZANU members formed a militant wing, the Zimbabwe African National Liberation Army, and sent ZANLA members to the People's Republic of China for training.

== Course of the war ==
=== First phase (1964–1972) ===
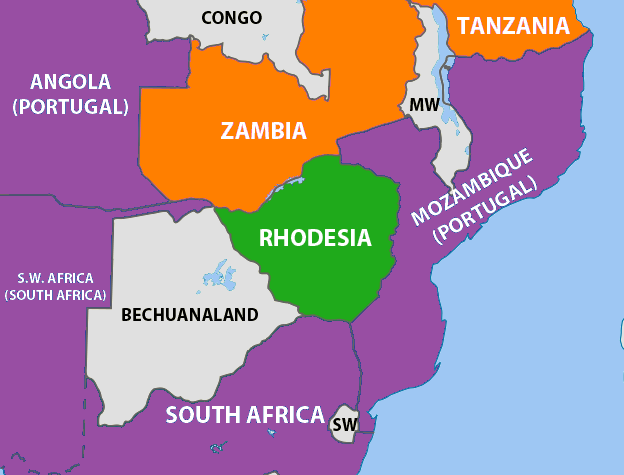
The geopolitical situation at the time of UDI on 11 November 1965. Rhodesia is coloured green, countries friendly to the nationalists are coloured orange and countries friendly to the government (South Africa and Portugal) are shown in purple.

On 4 July 1964, ZANU insurgents ambushed and murdered a white foreman from Silverstreams Wattle Company, Pieter Johan Andries (Andrew) Oberholzer. The killing had a lasting effect on the small, close-knit white community. The Smith administration detained ZANU and ZAPU leaders in August 1964. The major leaders imprisoned were Ndabaningi Sithole, Leopold Takawira, Edgar Tekere, Enos Nkala and Maurice Nyagumbo. The remaining military leaders of the ZANLA Dare ReChimurenga were Josiah Tongogara and the barrister Herbert Chitepo. Operating from bases in Zambia and later from Mozambique, militants began launching attacks against Rhodesia.

The conflict intensified after Rhodesia's Unilateral Declaration of Independence (UDI) from Britain on 11 November 1965. Sanctions (embargo) were imposed by Britain and endorsed by member states of the United Nations. The embargo meant that Rhodesia was hampered by a lack of modern equipment but it used other means to receive vital war supplies such as oil, munitions, and arms via the apartheid government of South Africa and Portugal. War material was also obtained through elaborate international smuggling schemes through Portuguese Mozambique, domestic production, and captured infiltrating enemy combatants.

Five months later, on 28 April 1966, the Rhodesian Security Forces engaged militants in Sinoia, during the first major engagement of the war. Seven ZANLA men were killed, and in retaliation the survivors killed two civilians at their farm near Hartley three weeks later.

During Portuguese rule of Mozambique, until 1974–1975, Rhodesia was able to defend its border with Zambia relatively easily and prevent many guerrilla incursions. It set up a strong defence along the Zambezi River running from Lake Kariba to the Mozambique border. Here 30-man camps were established at 8-kilometre intervals supported by mobile rapid reaction units. From 1966 to 1970, these defences accounted for 175 insurgents killed for the loss of 14 defenders. The conflict continued at a low level until 21 December 1972 when ZANLA conducted the attack on Altena Farm in north-east Rhodesia. In response, the Rhodesians moved to attack nationalists in their foreign camps and staging areas before they could infiltrate into Rhodesia.

Secret cross-border operations by the Special Air Service began in the mid-1960s, with Rhodesian Security Forces already engaging in hot pursuits into Mozambique. However, three weeks after the attack on Altena Farm, ZANLA killed two civilians and abducted a third into Mozambique and then Tanzania. In response, SAS troops were inserted into Mozambique with the approval of the Portuguese administration, in the first officially sanctioned external operation. The Rhodesian government began authorising more external operations.

In the first phase of the conflict (until the end of 1972), Rhodesia's political and military position was strong. Nationalist guerrillas did not make serious inroads. In the early 1970s, the two main nationalist groups faced serious internal divisions, aid from the Organisation of African Unity was temporarily suspended in 1971, and 129 nationalists were expelled from Zambia after they were alleged to have plotted against President Kenneth Kaunda.

Britain's efforts to isolate Rhodesia economically had not produced major compromises by the Smith Government. Indeed, late in 1971 the British and Rhodesian Governments had negotiated a compromise political settlement which would have bowed to the Smith Government's agenda of postponing majority rule into the indefinite future. When it was found that such a delayed approach to majority rule was unacceptable to most of Rhodesia's African population, the deal fell apart.

In 1971, Rhodesia joined Alcora Exercise, a secret defensive alliance for Southern Africa, formalised in 1970 by Portugal and South Africa. Alcora deepened the political and military co-operation between the three countries against the revolutionary insurgency in Rhodesia, Angola, Mozambique and South West Africa and against the hostile neighbouring countries.

However, the end of Portuguese rule in Mozambique created new military and political pressures on the Rhodesian Government to accept the principle of immediate majority rule.

=== Second phase (1972–1979) ===
The black nationalists continued to operate from secluded bases in neighbouring Zambia and from FRELIMO-controlled areas in the Portuguese colony of Mozambique, making periodic raids into Rhodesia. By 1973, guerrilla activity was increasing in the aftermath of the Altena Farm raid, particularly in the northeast part of the country where portions of the African population were evacuated from border areas, and compulsory military service for whites was extended to one year. As the war intensified, conscription was raised to men between the ages of 38 and 50, though this was modified in 1977. No white male 17-year-olds were allowed to leave the country.

In April 1974, the left-wing Carnation Revolution in Portugal heralded the coming end of colonial rule in Mozambique. A transitional government was formed within months and Mozambique became independent under FRELIMO rule on 25 June 1975. Such events proved beneficial to ZANLA and disastrous for the Rhodesians, adding 1,300 kilometres (800 mi) of hostile border. Indeed, with the demise of the Portuguese Empire, Ian Smith realised Rhodesia was surrounded on three sides by hostile nations and declared a formal state of emergency. Soon Mozambique closed its border, however Rhodesian forces continued to cross the border in "hot pursuit" raids, attacking the nationalists and their training camps, and engaged in skirmishes with Mozambican security forces.

By 1975–1976, it was clear that an indefinite postponement of majority rule, which had been the cornerstone of the Smith Government's strategy since UDI, was no longer viable. Even overt South African support for Rhodesia was waning. South Africa began scaling back economic assistance to Rhodesia, placed limits on the amount of fuel and munitions being supplied to the Rhodesian military, and withdrew the personnel and equipment they had previously provided to aid the war effort, including a border police unit that had been helping guard the Rhodesia-Zambia border.

In 1976, the length of active military service was extended to 18 months; this took effect immediately, with soldiers about to end their one-year service finding their active service extended. Even after discharge from regular service, white men entered the reserve forces, and were often called up for duty and subjected to long military service. Rhodesia recruited more black men to volunteer for military service. Although some raised questions about their loyalty, the Rhodesian government stated that it had no doubts about their loyalty, and planned to train black officers. Legislation to conscript blacks was introduced and came in effect in 1979, but the response to call-ups was poor. Rhodesia also recruited foreign volunteers for service, with groups of foreigners who served in Rhodesia including the Crippled Eagles and 7 Independent Company.

Late in 1976, Ian Smith accepted the basic elements of the compromise proposals made by US Secretary of State Henry Kissinger to introduce majority rule within two years. The Smith Government then sought to negotiate an acceptable settlement with moderate black leaders, while retaining strong white influence in key areas. The Rhodesian military, in turn, aimed to erode the rising military strength of the ZANLA and ZIPRA to the greatest extent possible in order to "buy time" for an acceptable political settlement to be reached.

==== Use of biological and chemical weapons ====
As the war continued to intensify, the Rhodesian Security Forces initiated a Chemical and Biological Weapons (CBW) programme to kill guerrillas both inside Rhodesia and in external camps in Zambia and Mozambique. The effort had three fronts. First, it aimed to eliminate guerrillas operating inside Rhodesia through contaminated supplies either provided by contact men, recovered from hidden caches, or stolen from rural stores.

Secondly, it aimed to contaminate water supplies along guerrilla infiltration routes into Rhodesia, forcing the guerrillas to either travel through arid regions to carry more water and less ammunition or travel through areas patrolled by the security forces. Finally, the Rhodesians sought to hit the guerrillas in their camps in Mozambique by poisoning food, beverages, and medicines.

The chemicals most used in the Rhodesian programme were parathion (an organophosphate insecticide) and thallium (a heavy metal commonly found in rodenticide). Biological agents the Rhodesians selected for use also included Vibrio cholerae (causative agent of cholera) and Bacillus anthracis (causative agent of anthrax). They also looked at using Rickettsia prowazekii (causative agent of epidemic typhus), and Salmonella typhi (causative agent of typhoid fever), and toxins—such as ricin and botulinum toxin.

==== Laying of minefields ====
Between 1976 and 1979, the Rhodesian Army laid extensive minefields along the country's eastern and northern borders to prevent infiltration and resupply of fighters based in Zambia and Mozambique. The mines were laid in dense patterns, one of which was known as the "Cordon Sanitaire" in six main districts and were estimated at independence to cover 511 sq km, later revised down to 310 sq km. The Zimbabwe Government estimated that the minefields contained 2.6 million anti-personnel landmines.

==== Nyadzonya raid ====
The Rhodesian Security Forces called up part-time soldiers on 2 May 1976 in preparation for a major counter-offensive. On 9 August 1976, Rhodesian Selous Scouts aided by former ZANLA commander Morrison Nyathi attacked a ZANLA camp at Nyadzonya in Mozambique containing over 5,000 guerrillas and several hundred refugees. The Selous Scouts, who numbered 72, dressed in FRELIMO uniforms and disguised their vehicles, attaching FRELIMO licence plates and painting them in FRELIMO colours. White soldiers wore black ski masks. They crossed the unmanned border into Mozambique at 0005 hours on 9 August and drove through the early morning to the camp, passing several FRELIMO sentries who saluted them as they went by.

When they reached the ZANLA camp at 0825 hours the six ZANLA soldiers on duty allowed them to enter, and the Rhodesian vehicles moved in and took up prearranged positions around the edge of the parade ground, on which stood about 4,000 guerrillas. When all was ready a Rhodesian soldier took his vehicle loudspeaker and announced in Shona: "Zimbabwe tatora", meaning "we have taken Zimbabwe", and Nyathi blew a whistle signalling the cadres to muster. The cadres began cheering and ran towards the vehicles, packing around them as more ran onto the parade ground from other areas of the camp.

The Rhodesians then opened fire and continued shooting until there was no movement on the parade ground, then they returned to Rhodesia. More than 300 ZANLA insurgents were reported killed by the Rhodesians, with four Selous Scouts lightly wounded. This figure is corroborated by ZANLA's official report, (Note: The official ZANLA report, dated 19 August 1976, specifies that before the raid, on 9 August 1976, there had been 5,250 people in the camp, of whom 604 were refugees. It goes on to say that afterwards 1,028 had been killed, 309 had been wounded and around 1,000 had gone missing.) though publicly both ZANLA and ZIPRA claimed that Nyadzonya had been a refugee camp.

Later, on 7 October 1976, militants bombed a railroad bridge over Matetsi River when a train carrying ore passed over. Black nationalist guerrillas attacked a tea plantation and killed 27 black workers near the Mozambican border on 21 December 1976.

==== Escalation of the war (1977) ====
White civilians; a woman and two young children killed at Elim Mission in eastern Rhodesia by ZANLA guerrillas in the 1978 Vumba massacre.

By 1977, the war had spread throughout Rhodesia. ZANLA continued to operate from Mozambique and remained dominant among the Mashona peoples in eastern and central Rhodesia. Meanwhile, ZIPRA remained active in the north and west, using bases in Zambia and Botswana, and were mainly supported by the Ndebele tribes. With this escalation came sophistication, organisation and modern weapons for the guerrillas, and although many were still untrained, an increasing number were trained in Communist bloc and other sympathetic countries.

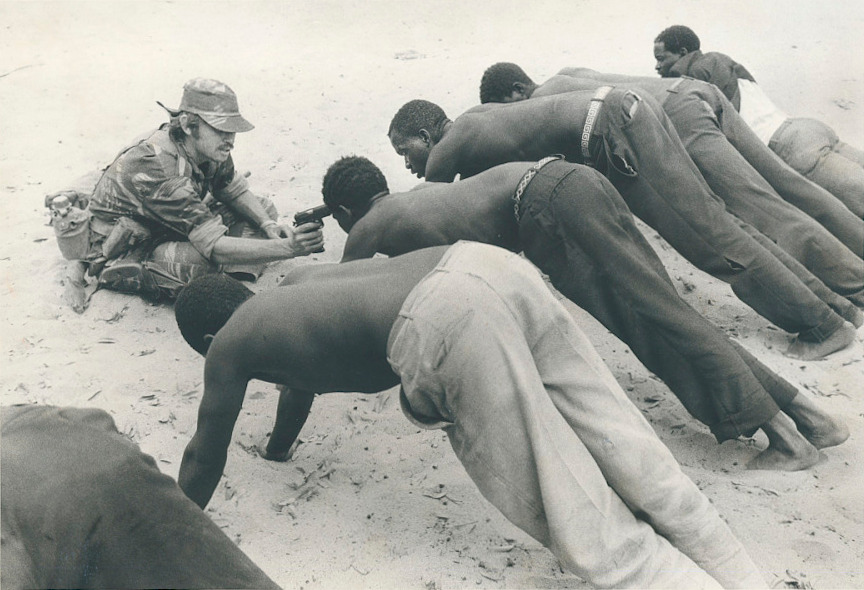
A Rhodesian soldier questioning villagers near the border with Botswana in 1977

Weapons fielded included TT pistols, PPSh-41 submachine guns, AK-47 and AKM assault rifles, SKS semi-automatic carbines, RPD and RPK light machine guns, as well as RPG-2 and RPG-7 rocket propelled grenade launchers and various Soviet grenades. The Rhodesians only discovered how well equipped the nationalists had become when raids on guerrilla base areas towards the end of the war revealed mortars, 12.7 mm and 14.5 mm heavy machine guns and even heavier calibre weapons such as 122 mm multiple rocket launchers.

On 3 April 1977, General Peter Walls announced that the government would launch a campaign to win the "hearts and minds" of Rhodesia's black citizens. In May, Walls received reports of ZANLA forces massing in the city of Mapai in Gaza Province, Mozambique. Prime Minister Smith gave Walls permission to destroy the base. Walls told the media the Rhodesian forces were changing tactics from contain and hold to search and destroy, "adopting hot pursuit when necessary".

On 30 May 1977, during Operation Aztec, 500 troops crossed the Mozambican border and travelled 100 km (60 mi) to Mapai, engaging the ZANLA forces with air cover from the Rhodesian Air Force and paratroopers in C-47 Dakotas. The Rhodesian government said the military killed 32 ZANLA fighters and lost one Rhodesian pilot. The Mozambican government disputed the number of casualties, saying it shot down three Rhodesian planes and a helicopter and took several thousand troops prisoner, all of which was denied by Minister of Combined Operations, Roger Hawkins.

Kurt Waldheim, the Secretary-General of the United Nations, condemned the incident on 1 June, and Walls announced a day later that the Rhodesian military would occupy Mapai until they had eliminated ZANLA's presence. But the American, British, and Soviet governments also condemned the raid and Rhodesian forces later withdrew from the area. The United Nations Security Council denounced the incursion of the "illegal racist minority regime in Southern Rhodesia" in Resolution 411, on 30 June 1977.

Militants bombed a Woolworths department store in Salisbury on 6 August 1977, killing 11 and injuring 70. Militants from Mozambique killed 16 black civilians in eastern Rhodesia on 21 August, burning the farmworkers' homes on a white-owned farm. In November 1977, in response to the buildup of ZANLA guerrillas in Mozambique, Rhodesian forces launched Operation Dingo, a pre-emptive combined arms surprise attack on guerrilla camps at Chimoio and Tembue in Mozambique. The attack was carried out over three days, from 23 to 25 November 1977. These operations reportedly inflicted thousands of casualties on Robert Mugabe's ZANLA cadres, probably blunting guerrilla incursions in the months that followed, but a steady intensification of the insurgency continued through 1978.

To disrupt FRELIMO's hold on Mozambique, the Rhodesian Central Intelligence Organisation helped to create and support an insurgency movement within Mozambique. This guerrilla group, known as RENAMO, battled with FRELIMO even as Rhodesian forces fought the ZANLA within Mozambique.

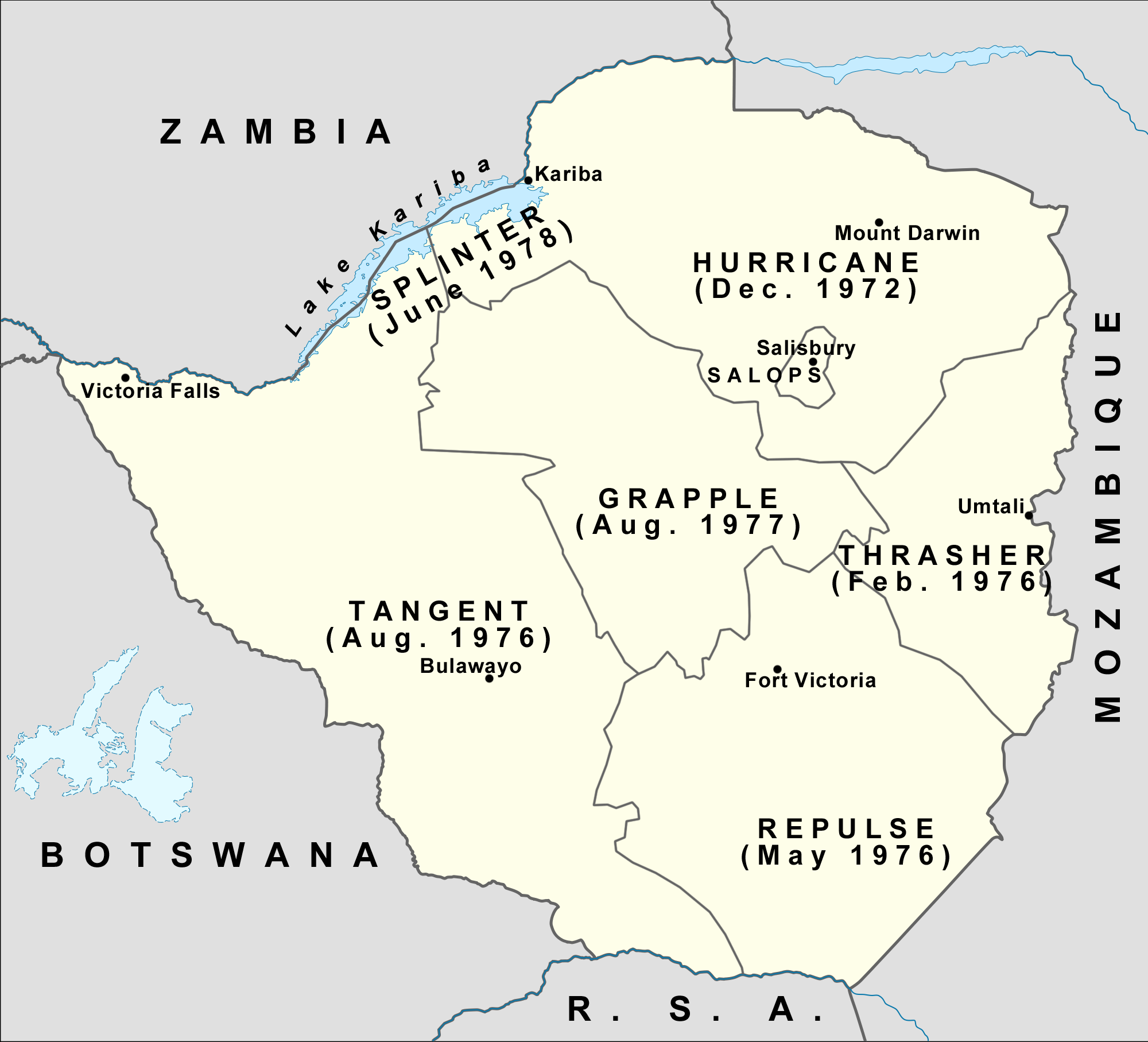
Map showing the operational areas of the Rhodesian Security Forces during the conflict.

In May 1978, 50 civilians were killed in crossfire between Marxist militants and the Rhodesian military, the most civilians killed in an engagement until then. In July, Patriotic Front members killed 39 black civilians and the Rhodesian government killed 106 militants. By mid-1978, black nationalist guerrillas had killed nearly 40 Christian missionaries. Seven white Catholic missionaries were killed by guerrillas at St. Paul's Mission, Musami on 6 February 1977. In the single worst attack on missionaries, 12 British missionaries and their children were killed in the Vumba massacre on 23 June 1978.

On 4 November 1978, Walls said 2,000 Patriotic Front militants had been persuaded to defect and fight for the Rhodesian Security Forces. In December 1978, a ZANLA unit penetrated the outskirts of Salisbury and fired a volley of rockets and incendiary device rounds into the main oil storage depot. The storage tanks burned for five days, giving off a column of smoke that could be seen 130 km (80 mi) away. Half a million barrels of petroleum product—a quarter of Rhodesia's fuel—was destroyed.

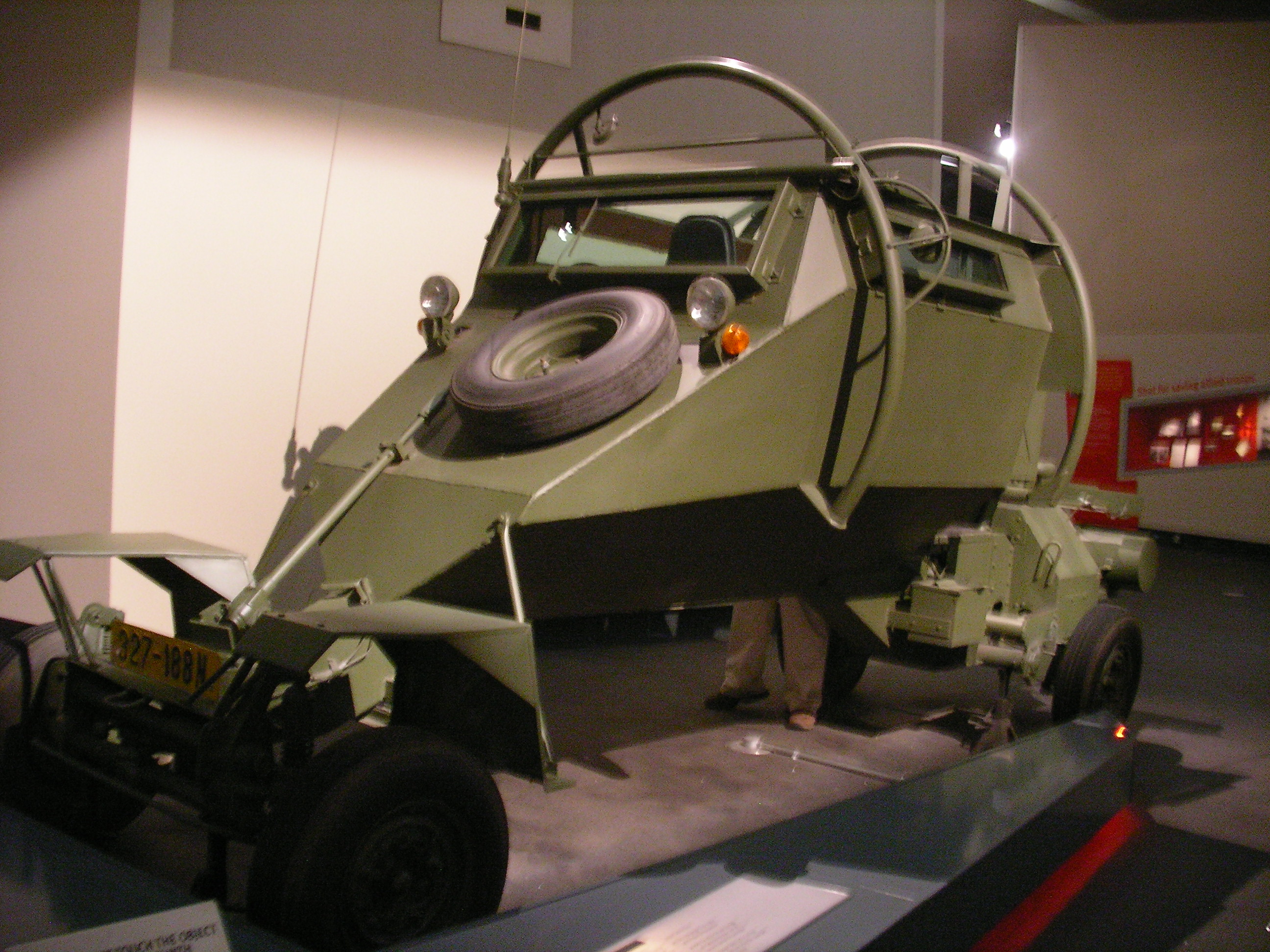
A Leopard APC, mine-protected vehicle, designed and built in Rhodesia during the late 1970s and based on a Volkswagen engine. This example is displayed in the Imperial War Museum North, Manchester, UK

In 1978, 450 ZANLA militants entered from Mozambique and attacked the town of Umtali. At the time, ZANU said the militants were women, an unusual characteristic, but in 1996 Joyce Mujuru said the vast majority involved were men and ZANU concocted the story to make Western organisations believe women were involved in the fighting. In retaliation for these acts, the Rhodesian Air Force bombed guerrilla camps 200 kilometres (125 mi) inside Mozambique, using Canberra B2 aircraft and Hawker Hunters—actively, but clandestinely, supported by several of the more capable Canberra B(I)12 aircraft of the South African Air Force. Joint-force bomber raids on guerrilla encampments and assembly areas in Mozambique and Zambia were mounted in 1978, and extensive air reconnaissance and surveillance of guerrilla encampments and logistical build-up was carried out by the South African Air Force on behalf of the RhAF.

==== Airliners shot down ====
Rhodesian external operations extended into Zambia after Nkomo's ZIPRA nationalists shot down two unarmed Vickers Viscount civilian airliners with Soviet-supplied SA-7 heat-seeking missiles. Encamped beneath the path of ascent towards Salisbury from Kariba Airport, the ZIPRA cadres downed Air Rhodesia Flight 825 on 3 September 1978 and Air Rhodesia Flight 827 on 12 February 1979. In the first incident, eighteen civilians on board survived, and five of these went away to find water. Half an hour later nine ZIPRA fighters arrived, promising help; three of the thirteen survivors hid when they saw them. In the words of Time magazine, the ZIPRA cadres "herded together the ten people at the wreckage, robbed them of their valuables, and finally cut them down with automatic weapons fire". Nkomo claimed responsibility for the attack and spoke of it to the BBC in a way Rhodesians considered gloating. In the second attack all 59 people on board were killed in the crash.

Audio from the cockpit of Green Leader during Operation Gatling at Westlands Farm.

In retaliation for the shooting down of Flight 825 in September 1978, Rhodesian Air Force Canberra bombers, Hunter fighter-bombers and helicopter gunships attacked the ZIPRA guerrilla base at Westlands farm near Lusaka in October 1978, warning Zambian forces by radio not to interfere.

The increased effectiveness of the bombing and follow-up 'air mobile' strikes using Dakota-dropped parachutists and helicopter 'air cav' techniques had a significant effect on the development of the conflict. As late as September 1979, despite the increased sophistication of guerrilla forces in Mozambique, a raid by Selous Scouts, with artillery and air support, on "New Chimoio" still reportedly resulted in heavy ZANLA casualties. (Note: The increased guerrilla capabilities were evident during that raid in that the insurgents, now armed with Soviet surface-to-air missiles, were able to shoot down a Rhodesian helicopter, killing all 12 on board.) However, a successful raid on the Rhodesian strategic fuel reserves in Salisbury also underscored the importance of concluding a negotiated settlement and achieving international recognition before the war expanded further.

==== Military pressure ====
The larger problem was that by 1979, combined ZIPRA and ZANLA strength inside Rhodesia totalled at least 12,500 guerrillas and it was evident that insurgents were entering the country at a faster rate than the Rhodesian forces could kill or capture; 22,000 ZIPRA and 16,000 ZANLA fighters remained uncommitted outside the country. Joshua Nkomo's ZIPRA forces were preparing their forces in Zambia with the intent of confronting the Rhodesians through a conventional invasion. Whether such an invasion could have been successful in the short term against the well trained Rhodesian army and air force is questionable. However, what was clear was that the insurgency was growing in strength daily and the ability of the security forces to continue to control the entire country was coming under serious challenge.

By putting the civilian population at risk, ZIPRA and the ZANLA had been particularly effective in creating conditions that accelerated white emigration. This not only seriously undermined the morale of the white population, it was also gradually reducing the availability of trained reserves for the army and the police. The economy was also suffering badly from the war; the Rhodesian GDP consistently declined in the late 1970s.

Politically, the Rhodesians were therefore pinning all their hopes on the "internal" political settlement that had been negotiated with moderate black nationalist leaders in 1978 and its ability to achieve external recognition and support. This internal settlement led to the creation of Zimbabwe-Rhodesia under a new constitution in 1979.

=== Resolution ===
Under the agreement of March 1978, the country was renamed Zimbabwe-Rhodesia, and in the general election of 24 April 1979, Bishop Abel Muzorewa became the country's first black prime minister. On 1 June 1979, Josiah Zion Gumede became president. The internal settlement left control of the military, police, civil service, and judiciary in white hands, and assured whites about one-third of the seats in parliament. It was essentially a power-sharing arrangement between whites and blacks. The factions led by Nkomo and Mugabe denounced the new government as a puppet of white Rhodesians and fighting continued. The hopes for recognition of the internal settlement, and of Zimbabwe-Rhodesia, by the newly elected Conservative government of Margaret Thatcher did not materialise after the latter's election in May 1979. Likewise, although the US Senate voted to lift sanctions against Zimbabwe-Rhodesia, the Carter administration also refused to recognise the internal settlement.

Thatcher sympathised with the internal settlement and thought of the ZANLA and ZIPRA leaders as terrorists, but was prepared to support a push for further compromise if it could end the fighting. Britain was also reluctant to recognise the internal settlement for fear of fracturing the unity of the Commonwealth. Thus later in 1979, the Thatcher government called a peace conference in London to which all nationalist leaders were invited.

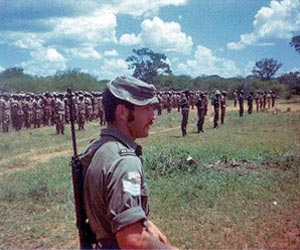
A New Zealand member of the Commonwealth Monitoring Force supervising a ZIPRA assembly point

The outcome of this conference would become known as the Lancaster House Agreement. During the conference, the Zimbabwe-Rhodesian Government accepted a watering down of the 1978 internal settlement while Mugabe and Nkomo agreed to end the war in exchange for new elections in which they could participate. The economic sanctions imposed on Rhodesia were lifted in late 1979, and the country reverted to temporary British rule until elections could be held. Under the Constitution of Zimbabwe-Rhodesia (Amendment) (No. 4) Act 1979 of 11 December 1979, the country formally reverted to its colonial status as Southern Rhodesia. The Zimbabwe-Rhodesian parliament voted itself out of power, and Lord Soames was appointed by the British government to rule the country as Governor-Designate, arriving in Salisbury on 12 December to take over from President Gumede. On 21 December 1979, a cease-fire was announced. An election was scheduled for early 1980. The British Commonwealth deployed an observer force, the Commonwealth Monitoring Force, to the country for the transitional period. Britain contributed 800 soldiers and 300 airmen, along with small contingents of sailors and marines. Australia, Fiji, Kenya, and New Zealand also contributed smaller numbers of troops. A nine-man British advance party arrived on 8 December to begin establishing a logistics base, and this was followed by the arrival of the main force shortly after.

The war would end in a military stalemate. However, the political compromise which was reached after combat ceased would work to the advantage of the black nationalists, especially those aligned with ZANU leader Robert Mugabe. Mugabe himself stated in an interview published in the 28 April 1980 edition of the New York Times "We did not win a military victory ... We reached a political settlement ... A compromise."

During the election of 1980, there were accusations of voter intimidation by Mugabe's guerrilla cadres, sections of which were accused of not having assembled in the designated guerrilla assembly points as required under the Lancaster House Agreement, and the international observers as well as Lord Soames were accused of looking the other way. The Rhodesian military may have seriously considered a coup d'état in March 1980. This alleged coup was to consist of two stages: Operation Quartz, coordinated attacks on guerrilla assembly points within the country, and Operation Hectic, the assassination of Mugabe and his key aides.

However, even in the context of alleged voter intimidation by ZANLA elements, widespread support for Mugabe from large sections of the black population (in particular from the Shona language group which made up the overwhelming majority of the country's population) could not be seriously disputed. Moreover, the clear absence of any external support for such a coup, and the inevitable conflagration that would have engulfed the country thereafter, scuttled the plan.

The election of early 1980 was won by Mugabe, who became prime minister after ZANU-PF received 63% of the vote. By 16 March 1980, all Commonwealth forces had departed, save for 40 infantry instructors who temporarily stayed behind to train the new nation's army. On 18 April 1980, interim British rule ended and the country was internationally recognised as independent. The colony of Southern Rhodesia was formally renamed Zimbabwe, and on 18 April 1982, the government changed the name of the country's capital from Salisbury to Harare.

== Aftermath ==
According to Rhodesian government statistics, more than 20,000 people were killed during the second war. From December 1972 to December 1979, 1,120 members of the Rhodesian security forces were killed, along with 10,050 guerrillas who were killed in Rhodesia, and an unknown number in Mozambique and Zambia, 7,790 black civilians, and 468 white civilians. After he assumed power, Robert Mugabe acted incrementally to consolidate his power, forming a coalition government with his ZAPU rivals and the white minority. The Rhodesian Army was merged with guerrilla forces to form the Zimbabwe Defence Forces, and the Rhodesian security forces were merged with ZANLA and ZIPRA forces. Joshua Nkomo was given a series of cabinet positions. The South African government recruited white Rhodesian Security Forces personnel in what was designated Operation Winter and around 5,000 took this up.

However, Mugabe was torn between keeping his coalition stable and pressures to meet the expectations of his followers for social change. Clashes between ZANLA and ZIPRA forces took place in 1980 and 1981. In February 1982, Mugabe fired Nkomo and two other ZAPU ministers from his cabinet, triggering bitter fighting between ZAPU supporters in Ndebele-speaking region of the country and the ruling ZANU. Between 1982 and 1985, the military crushed armed resistance from Ndebele groups in Matabeleland and the Midlands in a military crackdown known as Gukurahundi, a Shona term which translates roughly to mean "the early rain which washes away the chaff before the spring rains". The Gukurahundi campaigns were also known as the Matabeleland Massacres. The Zimbabwean military's North Korean-trained Fifth Brigade was deployed to Matabeleland to crush resistance. German journalist Shari Eppel estimates approximately 20,000 Matabele were murdered in these first years after the war; most of those killed were victims of public executions.

Violence between ZANLA and ZIPRA continued until 1987. In December 1987, the two groups reached an accord which saw them merge into one party known as ZANU PF, headed by Mugabe. Mugabe then became President and gained additional powers, as the office of prime minister was abolished. Beyond Zimbabwe's borders, as a result of Rhodesian aid and support for RENAMO, the Rhodesian Bush War also helped influence the outbreak of the Mozambican Civil War, which lasted from 1977 until 1992 and claimed a million lives.

== Historiography ==
=== Overview ===
Unlike many post-colonial African conflicts, the Rhodesian Bush War spawned an extensive written military historiography. Though the territory at the center of the conflict was known by four different names throughout the time of the war, historiographic works tend to call the country "Rhodesia" or "Zimbabwe". Histories that use the former term often focus on the actions of white soldiers without much account of the conflict's political context, while many works that use the latter term frame the event as a victorious guerrilla liberation war.

=== Rhodesian narratives ===
Many Rhodesian veterans wrote memoirs about their service after the second Bush War, most of them emanating from soldiers who served in the RLI or Selous Scouts. These works were either self-published, published with vanity presses, or with specialized publishing houses. The memoirs tended to focus more on unit culture and non-military activities such as poaching, or "taming" captured African insurgents into domestic servants. Most of these books were released in Africa; few became commercial successes in the United Kingdom or the United States. Grouped together with fictional novels about the war, the memoirs are sometimes placed in a genre of "neo-Rhodesian" literature. Claims involving use of biological and chemical weapons by Rhodesian forces appeared only in post-war literature.

The first major Rhodesian memoir to be released was Reid-Daly's account of the Selous Scouts, Selous Scouts Top Secret War, published by Galago—a publishing house run by Peter Stiff—in 1982. Galago continued to be a major publisher of these works. Publishing of these memoirs accelerated during Zimbabwe's economic decline in the 1990s. These works increasingly incorporated material from other memoirs and some secondary works, though they generally displayed little knowledge of ZANLA's or ZIPRA's version of events. Many also featured direct and indirect criticism of other soldiers and memoirists. Some of these disputes led to lawsuits. Seizures of white-owned farms in the 2000s led to a massive growth in the literature. Revised editions of previous memoirs were also common. Chris Cocks' Fireforce was re-released by Galago and edited by Stiff. Stiff removed all references to drug use in the new edition, since he wanted to portray the RLI as heroes.

=== Zimbabwean nationalist discourse ===
Early literature on nationalist guerrillas in Rhodesia tended to focus on ZANLA and ignore ZIPRA. Several autobiographies and memoirs were published by Zimbabwean nationalists in the late 1970s and early 1980s. Masipule Sithole, the younger brother of Ndabaningi, wrote Zimbabwe: Struggles within the Struggle, which described conflicts between ZANU and ZAPU with an emphasis on ethnic disagreements. David Martin and Phyllis Johnson published The Struggle for Zimbabwe in 1981, which chronicled the formation and development of nationalist movements. It was printed with a favourable foreword by Mugabe and was wielded by the post-independent Zimbabwean government as evidence of the courage and sacrifices of ZANU and ZANLA, including incorporation into secondary school curriculum. The first major academic work covering the nationalist guerrilla perspective of the war was Terence Ranger's Peasant Consciousness and Guerrilla War in Zimbabwe, published in 1985. It focused on eastern Rhodesia and constituted a largely uncritical account of ZANLA activities in that area. The book did not address violence inflicted by ZANLA on African TTL residents and concluded that rural blacks were "united" in supporting the guerrilla movement. Ranger later reflected that his work duplicated ZANU's nationalist rhetoric. Romanticised interpretations of the Zimbwabwean nationalist endeavor fell out of scholarly favour in the mid-1990s. Since then, more critical works of the nationalist movement have predominated, highlighting complexities in the war. More works focusing on ZIPRA have also been published, though the nature of differences between ZANLA and ZIPRA as well as the geographical spread of the two guerrilla forces remains debated.

=== Critical analysis ===
In her 1992 book, Zimbabwe's Guerrilla War, political scientist Norma J. Kriger rejected "the existing portrait of ZANU's successful politicisation of the Zimbabwean countryside during the liberation war" and concluded that relations between nationalist guerrillas and TTL villagers in Mutoko District were predominantly characterized by violence and coercion. She also wrote that insofar as peasants voluntarily collaborated with ZANLA, it was often in the hopes of using them to settle petty personal scores and protect their local interests. Historian Luise White wrote that the white Rhodesian war accounts did not present a unified and agreed telling of the conflict, and instead "struggled over what being a white Rhodesian meant, and what pasts and futures soldiers brought to the war". Reflecting on their truthfulness, White stated, "Many of the stories and events in these memoirs are not true, or at least not wholly accurate." Reid-Daly later testified during a lawsuit involving an authorship dispute that he had "exaggerated or embellished the true story" several times in Selous Scouts Top Secret War. Many of these works maintained that the Rhodesian Army "won every battle but lost at the negotiating table" at Lancaster House. White criticised this view, writing, "First, there weren't really any battles, and second, while Rhodesian soldiers were not routed anywhere, they did not win any decisive victories either, especially during the mid-1970s when guerrilla forces were in disarray. In terms of strategy in the middle and late 1970s, it is not altogether clear that the Rhodesian state wanted victory more than it wanted a strong position from which to negotiate some kind of transition to majority rule." Academic M. T. Howard wrote that the portrayal of the Rhodesian Army as a nearly-invincible institution served both white Rhodesian and black Zimbabwean nationalist discourses; the former benefitted from showing a capable force which was never defeated in the field, and the latter argued that their ultimate success was made more impressive.

== See also ==
- Rhodesian Bush War memorials
- "Rhodesians Never Die"
- Alcora Exercise
- History of the Rhodesian Light Infantry (1961–1972)
- History of the Rhodesian Light Infantry (1972–1977)
- History of the Rhodesian Light Infantry (1977–1980)
- Military history of Africa
- Portuguese Colonial War
- Rhodesia and weapons of mass destruction
- Rhodesian Armoured Corps
- First Chimurenga
- Security Force Auxiliaries
- South African Border War

== Notes and references ==
=== Sources ===
- Abbott, Peter; Botham, Philip (1986). Modern African Wars: Rhodesia, 1965–80. Oxford: Osprey Publishing. ISBN 978-0-85045-728-5.
- Beckett, Ian F. W. (2007). "The Rhodesian Army: Counter-Insurgency, 1972–1979 Part II". selousscouts.tripod.com.
- Bennett, David C. (March 1990). "The Army of Zimbabwe: a role model for Namibia" (PDF). Carlisle Barracks, Pennsylvania: United States Army War College. Archived (PDF) from the original on 24 February 2017.
- Bhebe, Ngwabi; Ranger, Terrence, eds. (1995). Soldiers in Zimbabwe's Liberation War. Vol. 1. James Currey (London) / Heinemann (Portsmouth, NH) / University of Zimbabwe Publications (Harare).
- Binda, Alexandre (2008). The Saints: The Rhodesian Light Infantry. Johannesburg: 30° South Publishers. ISBN 978-1-920143-07-7.
- Brent, W. A (1987). Rhodesian Air Force: A Brief History 1947–1980. Kwambonambi: Freeworld Publications. ISBN 978-0-620-11805-7.
- Britannica Book of the Year 1971: Events of 1970 (1st ed.). Chicago: Encyclopædia Britannica, Inc. 1971. ISBN 978-0852291580.
- Britannica (1972). Britannica Book of the Year 1972: Events of 1971. Chicago: Encyclopædia Britannica, Inc.
- Britannica (1974). Britannica Book of the Year 1974: Events of 1973. Chicago: Encyclopædia Britannica, Inc.
- Britannica (1976). Britannica Book of the Year 1976: Events of 1975. Chicago: Encyclopædia Britannica, Inc.
- Cary, Robert; Mitchell, Diana (1977). African Nationalist Leaders in Rhodesia who's who. Salisbury: Books of Rhodesia. ISBN 978-0-86920-152-7.
- Cilliers, Jackie (1984). Counter-Insurgency in Rhodesia. London, Sydney & Dover, New Hampshire: Croom Helm. ISBN 978-0-7099-3412-7.
- Doron, Roy; Thomas, Charles G. (2019). "Introducing the New Lens of African Military History". Journal of African Military History. 3 (2): 79–92. doi:10.1163/24680966-00302004. S2CID 213431661.
- Eppel, Shari (26 March 2008). "Matabeleland: Its Struggle for National Legitimacy, and the Relevance of this in the 2008 Election" (PDF). Berlin: Heinrich Böll Foundation. Archived from the original (PDF) on 11 May 2013.
- Friedman, Sgt-Major Herbert A. (28 November 2006). "Rhodesia Psyop 1965–1980". psywarrior.com.
- Harris, P. B. (September 1969). "The Rhodesian Referendum: June 20th, 1969". Parliamentary Affairs. 23 (1969sep): 72–80. doi:10.1093/parlij/23.1969sep.72.
- Helliker, Kirk; Bhatasara, Sandra; Chiweshe, Manase Kudzai (2021). Fast Track Land Occupations in Zimbabwe In the Context of the Zvimurenga. Springer. ISBN 978-3-030-66347-6.
- Howard, M.T. (2021). "The Rhodesian army, between facts and fiction". Journal of Southern African Studies. 47 (4): 721–726. Bibcode:2021JSAfS..47..723H. doi:10.1080/03057070.2021.1917921. S2CID 236290715.
- Kalley, Jacqueline Audrey (1999). Southern African Political History: A chronological of key political events from independence to mid-1997. Westport, CN: Greenwood Publishing Group. ISBN 978-0-313-30247-3.
- Kriger, Norma J. (1988). "The Zimbabwean War of Liberation: Struggles within the Struggle". Journal of Southern African Studies. 14 (2): 304. Bibcode:1988JSAfS..14..304K. doi:10.1080/03057078808708176. S2CID 144222740.
- Kriger, Norma J. (2003). Guerrilla Veterans in Post-war Zimbabwe: Symbolic and Violent Politics, 1980–1987. Cambridge University Press. ISBN 978-0-521-81823-0.
- Lake, Anthony (1976). The 'Tar Baby' Option: American Policy Toward Southern Rhodesia. New York: Columbia University Press. ISBN 978-0-231-04066-2.
- Lohman, Charles M.; MacPherson, Robert I. (7 June 1983). "Rhodesia: Tactical Victory, Strategic Defeat" (PDF). War Since 1945 Seminar and Symposium.
- Lyons, Tanya (2004). Guns and Guerrilla Girls: Women in the Zimbabwean National Liberation Struggle (doctorate thesis). Asmara, Erythrea / Trenton, NJ: Africa Research & Publications. ISBN 978-1-59221-167-8. (presentation)
- Martin, David; Johnson, Phyllis (1981). The Struggle for Zimbabwe (1st ed.). London: Faber and Faber. ISBN 978-0-571-11066-7.
- Moorcraft, Paul L.; McLaughlin, Peter (2008) [1982]. The Rhodesian War: A Military History. Barnsley: Pen and Sword Books. ISBN 978-1-84415-694-8.
- Muzondidya, James (2005). Walking on a Tightrope: Towards a Social History of the Coloured Community of Zimbabwe. Trenton, NJ: Africa Research & Publications. ISBN 978-1-59221-246-0.
- Norman, Andrew (December 2003). Robert Mugabe and the Betrayal of Zimbabwe. Jefferson, NC: McFarland & Company. ISBN 978-0-7864-1686-8.
- Nyarota, Geoffrey (2006). Against the Grain. Cape Town: Struik Publishers. ISBN 978-1-77007-112-4.
- Palley, Claire (1966). The constitutional history and law of Southern Rhodesia 1888–1965, with special reference to Imperial control (First ed.). Oxford: Clarendon Press. ASIN B0000CMYXJ.
- Preston, Matthew (2004). Ending civil war: Rhodesia and Lebanon in perspective. London: I.B. Tauris. ISBN 978-1-85043-579-2.
- Reid-Daly, Ron; Stiff, Peter (1983). Selous Scouts: Top Secret War. Johannesburg: Galago Publishing. ISBN 978-0-620-06674-7.
- Rogers, Anthony (1998). Someone Else's War: Mercenaries from 1960 to the Present. Hammersmith: HarperCollins. ISBN 978-0-00-472077-7.
- Ryan, Johnny (2004). "Principled Failure: British Policy Toward Rhodesia, 1971–72". The History Review. School of History and Archives, University College Dublin.
- Sellström, Tor (1999). Sweden and National Liberation in Southern Africa. Volume I: Formation of a Popular Opinion 1950–1970. Uppsala: Nordic Africa Institute. ISBN 978-91-7106-430-1.
- Sibanda, Eliakim M. (2005). The Zimbabwe African People's Union 1961–87: A Political History of Insurgency in Southern Rhodesia. Trenton, New Jersey: Africa Research & Publications. ISBN 978-1-59221-276-7.
- Smith, Ian (1997). The Great Betrayal: The Memoirs of Ian Douglas Smith. London: John Blake Publishing. ISBN 978-1-85782-176-5.
- St. John, Lauren (2007). Rainbow's End: A Memoir of Childhood, War, and an African Farm (First ed.). New York: Scribner. ISBN 978-0-7432-8679-4.
- Stearns, Peter N., ed. (2002). The Encyclopedia of World History: Ancient, Medieval and Modern – Chronologically Arranged (6th ed.). Cambridge: James Clarke & Co. ISBN 978-0-227-67968-5.
- Thomas, Scott (1995). The Diplomacy of Liberation: the Foreign Relations of the ANC Since 1960 (1st ed.). London: I.B. Tauris. ISBN 978-1-85043-993-6.
- Wessels, Hannes (2010). P. K. van der Byl: African Statesman. Johannesburg: 30° South Publishers. ISBN 978-1-920143-49-7.
- Williams, Gwyneth; Hackland, Brian (1988). The Dictionary of Contemporary Politics of Southern Africa (1st ed.). London: Routledge. ISBN 978-0-415-00245-5.
- Windrich, Elaine (1975). The Rhodesian problem: a documentary record, 1923–1973 (1st ed.). London: Routledge & Kegan Paul. ISBN 978-0-7100-8080-6.
- Wood, J.R.T. (2008). A matter of weeks rather than months: The Impasse between Harold Wilson and Ian Smith: Sanctions, Aborted Settlements and War 1965–1969. Victoria, British Columbia: Trafford Publishing. ISBN 978-1-4251-4807-2.
- White, Luise (2021). Fighting and Writing: The Rhodesian Army at War and Postwar (online ed.). Durham: Duke University Press. ISBN 978-1-4780-2128-5.
