= Alcora Exercise =

Aliança Contra as Rebeliões em Africa English: Alliance against the rebellions in Africa
- 1970–1974
- Headquarters: Pretoria, South Africa
- Other languages: Afrikaans; English; Portuguese
- Type: Military alliance
- Membership: Portugal; Rhodesia; South Africa

Leaders
  - Director-General, PAPO: Major-General Clifton
  - Main organ: Alcora Top Level Commossion

Establishment
  - Established: 14 October 1970
  - Dissolved: 25 April 1974

The Alcora Exercise (Afrikaans: Alcora Oefening, Portuguese: Exercício Alcora/Projeto Alcora) or simply Alcora, the acronym codename for Aliança Contra as Rebeliões em Africa (lit. 'Alliance against the rebellions in Africa'), was a secret military alliance of Portugal, Rhodesia and South Africa, formally in force between 1970 and 1974.

== Goal ==
The official goal of Alcora Exercise was to investigate the processes and means by which a coordinated tripartite effort between the three countries could face the mutual threat to their territories in Southern Africa. The immediate goal was to face the African revolutionary movements that fought guerrilla wars against the Portuguese authorities in Angola and Mozambique, to limit the spread of the action of these movements in Rhodesia and South West Africa and to prepare the defense of the Portuguese, Rhodesian and South African territories against an expected conventional military aggression from the hostile governments of the African neighbor countries.

Alcora was the formalization of informal agreements on military cooperation between the local Portuguese, Rhodesian and South African military commands that had been in place since the mid-1960s. Alcora was kept secret and referred to as an 'exercise' (not an alliance or treaty), mainly due to the pressure of the Portuguese government, that feared the external and internal political issues that would be raised if it appeared to be associated with the minority rule in Rhodesia and the apartheid government of South Africa, in contradiction to the official Portuguese doctrine of the existence of racial equality in Angola and Mozambique.

Under Alcora, Portugal, Rhodesia and South Africa cooperated in the Angolan War of Independence, the Mozambican War of Independence, the Rhodesian Bush War and the South African Border War.

== Collapse ==
The Alcora alliance collapsed due to the Portuguese Carnation Revolution of 25 April 1974 and the subsequent independence of Angola and Mozambique that followed.
