= Somabhula =

Human settlement in Midlands, Zimbabwe

Coordinates: 19°42′S 29°40′E

Somabhula is a village and ward (commune) in Midlands province in Zimbabwe. It is also the rail junction for Zimbabwe's southern links to neighboring Mozambique and South Africa.

It is an important area for cattle ranching and mixed farming. Somabhula was the largest of the land reform projects undertaken by Robert Mugabe and his ZANU-PF government. Prior to the expropriation and allocation of land for land reform, the farmland of Somabhula was an area of concentrated land ownership and speculation by white farmers.

It is believed to have been named after an influential chief Matebele.

== Infrastructure ==
The village has one of the most important railway stations in Zimbabwe, serving as an interconnection between the Limpopo railway and the Beira–Bulawayo railway.
