= School of History (University College Dublin) =

The UCD School of History (Scoil na Staire UCD) is the department of University College Dublin which is responsible for the study of history. As of 2020, it was reputedly one of "the top 100 history schools in the world". It was established at the foundation of the University in 1854.

One of department's most important figures was Eoin MacNeill, who held the Professorship of Early Irish (including medieval) history from 1909 to 1916 and from 1918 to 1942. MacNeill was also involved in shaping the new Irish state and served as Minister for Education between 1922 and 1925.

== University College Dublin Archives ==
The University College Dublin Archives department was originally set up in 1971 by Robert Dudley Edwards, Professor of Modern Irish History from 1944 to 1979, and formalised as the University Archives Service in 1997. Its core function is the curatorship of the archives of University College Dublin (UCD) and its predecessors, along with collections of private papers and institutional archives which document the foundation and development of modern Ireland.

Collections are acquired from institutions and bodies within UCD and from external sources. Its collections policy is centered on a core of political private papers, including those of figures such as Éamon de Valera, John A. Costello, Cearbhall Ó Dálaigh, Conor Cruise O'Brien and Terence MacSwiney, political parties such as Fianna Fáil and Fine Gael, administrators such as T. K. Whitaker, as well as figures from the arts world including poet Denis Devlin and actor Dan O'Herlihy.

In addition to curation of collections, the school provides the only recognised course in Ireland for the training of professional archivists: the MA in Archives and Records Management is accredited by the Society of Archivists (UK and Ireland).

== Operation ==
The school comprises approximately 1,200 students. 1,000 of these are taught at undergraduate level, the remainder are postgraduate students. The school is responsible for history programmes at the BA, MA, MLitt and Ph.D level.

Former notable UCD history graduates have included journalist Kevin Myers, broadcaster Philip Boucher-Hayes, entrepreneur Denis O'Brien, TV personality Ryan Tubridy and bestselling writer Maeve Binchy.

== The History Review ==
The History Review is an academic journal produced in the School of History and Archives at UCD. While it was initially a means to an end for history postgraduates to publish their work in a local academic context, the journal is now a platform for research and opinion on international relations, history, politics and current affairs. not current not very important.
