= Mapai, Mozambique =

Mapai
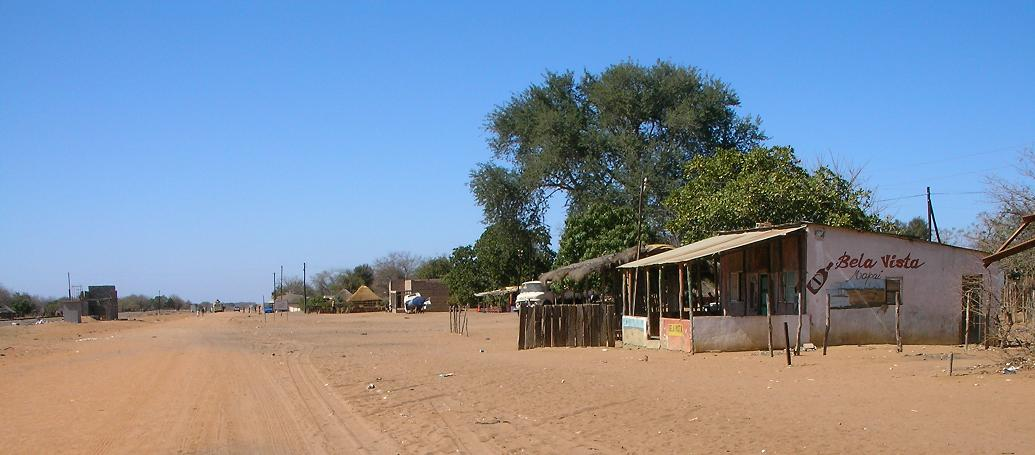

- Location within Mozambique
- Coordinates: 22°43′50″S 32°03′30″E
- Country: Mozambique
- Provinces: Gaza Province
- Elevation: 237 m (778 ft)

Mapai is a small town in southern Mozambique. It is a semi-arid region, with a dry climate and vegetation dominated by mopane (Colophospermum mopane) and galleries of ironwood (Androstachys johnsonii).

== Transport ==
Mapai is served by a station of the southern railway line which runs between Maputo and the Zimbabwe border at Chicualacuala. It is also an important road crossing, with the Chicualacuala-Maputo road meeting the road from Pafuri and the road to Banhine National Park.

== Tourism ==
Given its location between Limpopo National Park, Gonarezhou National Park and Banhine National Park, Mapai is set to form an important hub for the Great Limpopo Transfrontier Park.

== History ==
In colonial times, Mapai was a popular hunting destination with visits from well-known South African personalities including Jan Smuts, Ben Schoeman, Victor Verster and Judge Louis Weyers, as well as Paul Dutton. Mapai was also the seat of the powerful Western Native Labour Association, which supplied South African mines with labour, and N’Gala Limited which was Orlando Pais Mamede's transport company, as well as, the Pecuaria de Mapulanguene trading mainly in Brahman and Hereford cattle, also belonged to Pais Mamede.

In June 1976, the Selous Scouts, a Rhodesian special operations unit, launched a raid on the ZANLA transit camp in Mapai and Chicualacuala. The area again came under attack on 31 October 1976. It was again the site of fierce fighting during Operation Uric in September 1979 during the final months of the Rhodesian Bush War.

Mapai was founded by Orlando Pais Mamede as a ranch headquarters. This area had its own school, sports centre, generators and a basic telephone system. After independence the family was forced to leave and today there is nothing but ruins and the corroding shells of the family vehicles.

== See also ==
- Transport in Mozambique
