= Limpopo railway =

Railway line in southern Africa

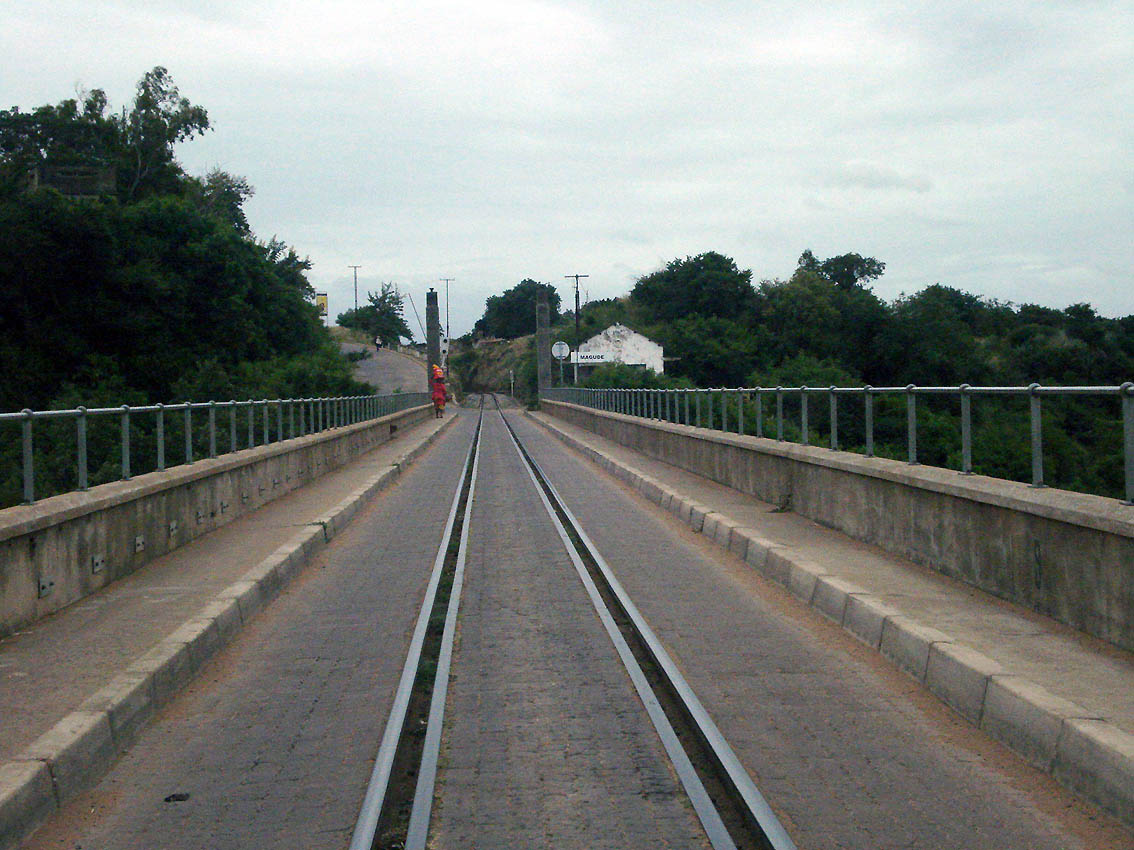

Overview
- Status: Operational
- Termini: Port of Maputo, Maputo, Mozambique; Somabhula, Zimbabwe

Service
- Type: Cape gauge
- Operator(s): CFM and NRZ

History
- Opened: 1914

Technical
- Line length: 900 km (560 mi)
- Track gauge: 1,067 mm (3 ft 6 in)

Limpopo Railway, also called Gweru-Maputo railway, is a railway that connects the city of Maputo, Mozambique, to the city from Somabhula, in Zimbabwe. It is 900 km long, in a 1067 mm gauge.

On the Mozambican stretch, between Maputo and Chicualacuala, the managing company is Mozambique Ports and Railways (CFM); on the Zimbabwean stretch, between the cities of Nyangambe (Sango-Nyala) and Somabhula, the administration is done by the company National Railways of Zimbabwe (NRZ).

Its main maritime logistics facility is the port of Maputo.

== History ==
The construction of a railway line that was to run parallel to the valleys of the Incomati and Limpopo rivers began in the 1910s, initially connecting the city of Moamba, Magude and Ungubana, reaching the village of Xinavane. This stretch was completed and entered into operations in 1914.

In May 1953, works on the line were resumed, connecting Ungubana (the Ungubana-Xinavane link became a railway branch) to Chócue and Canicado, then heading north, reaching Chicualacuala (formerly Malvernia) in 1955.

The second stage of the line was inaugurated at a ceremony held on 1 August 1955, where Mozambican-Portuguese and Nyasaland-British colonial authorities were present. The Mozambican stretch initially connected Moamba and Chicualacuala, using the stretch of the Ressano Garcia railway between Moamba and Maputo to access the port of Maputo.

In the 1960s the government of Rhodesia completed the extension of the railway from Chicualacuala/Nyangambe, passing through Rutenga, until reaching the Somabhula junction station.

The Mozambican Civil War interrupted railroad traffic, causing, due to attacks and sabotages, the almost total degradation of the Mozambican section of the line.

The Limpopo Railway was restored in the 1990s, but had to be practically rebuilt in 2004 after the damage caused by the floods in 2000 in the Limpopo and Incomati river valleys.

After the reopening, it changed its route definitively, starting from Maputo and not from Moamba, going directly to Manhiça and Chócue; however, they have been operating well below cargo capacity, due to weak demand from Zimbabwe and other neighboring countries.

== Railway branches ==
The Limpopo railway has two important branches:

- Nandi-Mkwasine branch: connects the village of Mbizi to the village of Mkwasine.
- Noelvale branch: in the city of Zvishavane.

== Railway connections ==
In Rutenga, the Limpopo line connects with the Rutenga-Beitbridge railway.

In Somabhula, the Limpopo line connects with the Beira-Bulawayo railway.

In Maputo, the Limpopo line connects with the Pretoria-Maputo railway and the Goba railway.

== Main railway stations ==
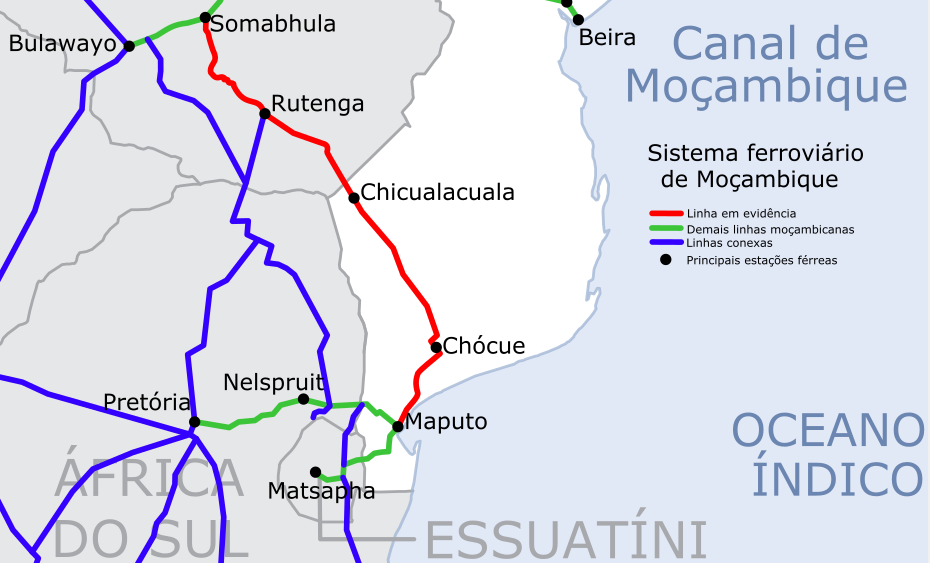
Limpopo railway map (red line); railways with junction (in green); other railway routes (in blue).

The main railway stations of the Limpopo railway are:

- Maputo (junction railway station)
- Manhiça
- Chokwe
- Chicualacuala
- Sango-Nyangambe
- Mbizi
- Rutenga (junction railway station)
- Zvishavane
- Somabhula (junction railway station)
