= Mbizi =

Human settlement in Masvingo, Zimbabwe

Coordinates: 21°23′S 31°01′E

Mbizi is a village in Masvingo Province, Zimbabwe. It is the junction of the Gweru-Maputo and lowveld railway lines, operated by National Railways of Zimbabwe, and a loading point for sugar cane being taken for refinement at Triangle.
