= Sango, Zimbabwe =

Sango Vila Salazar
- Village
- Sango located in Zimbabwe Map
- Coordinates: 22°04′11″S 31°40′49″E
- Country: Zimbabwe
- Province: Masvingo Province
- Time zone: UTC+2 (CAT)

Sango, also known as Nyala and Nyangambe, is a village and ward (commune) in Masvingo Province, Zimbabwe on the Mozambique border. The village supports the border post lying at the southern end of the Gonarezhou National Park.

The town on the Mozambique side of the border is Chicualacuala.

The old official name of the town was Vila Salazar.

== Transports ==
The village has a railway station on the Limpopo railway that connects it to the Mozambican city of Chicualacuala and the Zimbabwean city of Rutenga.

== See also ==
- Railway stations in Zimbabwe
