= Chicualacuala =

- Location within Mozambique
- Coordinates: 22°05′S 31°41′E
- Country: Mozambique
- Provinces: Gaza Province
- District: Chicualacuala District
- Elevation: 448 m (1,470 ft)

Chicualacuala is a town located in the province of Gaza in Mozambique. The town is better known by this unofficial name (and the name of the district to which the town belongs) than by its official toponym Vila Eduardo Mondlane.

== History ==
The colonial name of the town was Malvérnia in honor of Godfrey Huggins, 1st Viscount Malvern.

Chicualacuala had a turbulent history with attacks from Rhodesia on numerous occasions because it is the site of a key tropo-spheric communication. The town is located at an important crossing point near the border.

== Geography ==
Nearby towns and villages include Nyala (8.5 km), Samo (14.2 km), Cherilele (6.3 km), Benibueni (6.7 km) and Sambula (21.4 km).

== Transport ==
The railway systems of Zimbabwe and Mozambique meet at this town and the railway station is part of the Limpopo railway. The station is paired with the Zimbabwe station of Sango.

== See also ==
- Railway stations in Mozambique
- Railway stations in Zimbabwe
