= Conscription in Rhodesia =

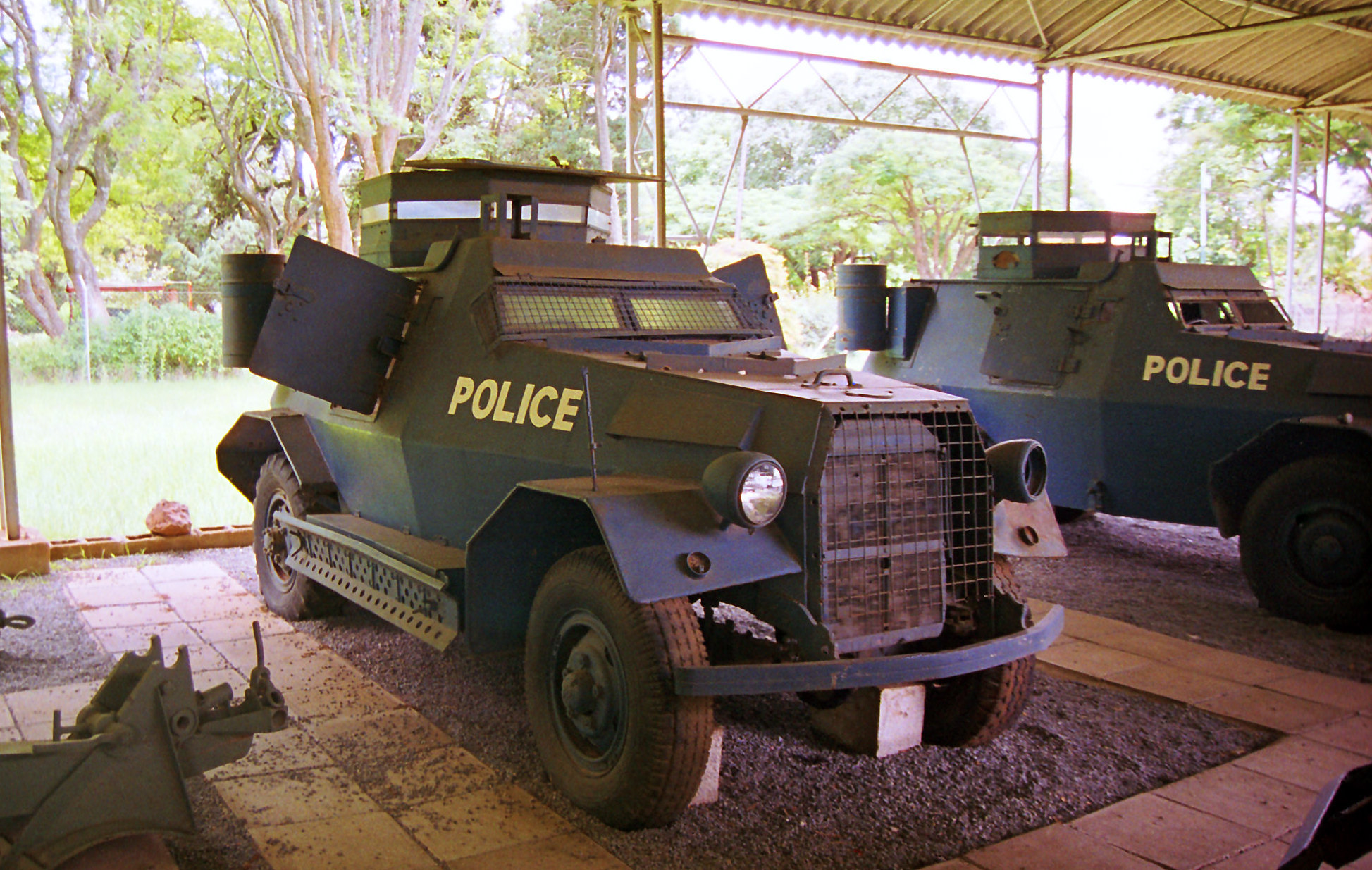
Marmon-Herrington armoured cars that were operated by the BSAP Reserve, which was manned by conscripts

Conscription played a significant role in the history of Rhodesia, including during the Rhodesian Bush War that took place between 1966 and 1979. Men from the small white minority that dominated Rhodesia were required to participate in a national service scheme from 1957. The relatively large Rhodesian Security Forces, most of whose personnel were conscripts, contributed to the government's confidence to declare independence in November 1965 rather than agree to a transition to majority rule. Throughout the Bush War, the Security Forces relied on white conscripts. The great majority of the population, who were black, were exempt from conscription until shortly before the end of the war. Coloured and Indian men were subject to conscription and experienced racial discrimination in the Security Forces.

Young men who were eligible for conscription were required to undertake a period of full-time national service in the Security Forces. At the conclusion of this period, they remained liable for call up as members of the part-time reserves. This made conscription a major element in the lives of white Rhodesian men, though some evaded their obligations. Coloured and Indian conscripts received lower pay than whites for most of the war and undertook duties white personnel did not want to do. The government was reluctant to extend conscription to black men due to its racial views, the availability of sufficient black volunteers and concerns that such conscripts would be unreliable. Most of the blacks who were called up during 1979 did not report.

As the Bush War escalated and Rhodesia's military situation deteriorated, requirements on conscripts were increased. This included longer periods of mandatory national service as well as more frequent and lengthy call ups of reservists. Men from older age groups also became liable for service, with 50 to 60 year olds being required to serve in the Security Forces from early 1979. This placed a considerable burden on the white minority and contributed to high rates of emigration. It also harmed the Rhodesian economy. The declining white population undermined Rhodesia's war effort and contributed to the transition to majority rule as Zimbabwe in 1980.

== Background ==
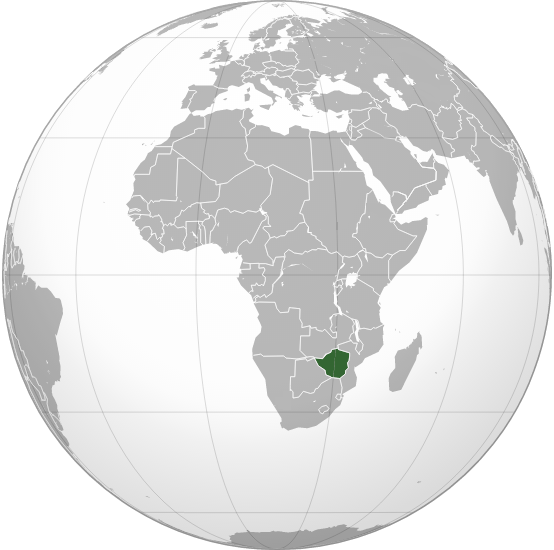
A map showing Rhodesia's location in Africa

Southern Rhodesia was a British colony in southern Africa which was founded by the British South Africa Company in 1890 and achieved self-government in 1923. Its economy and government was controlled by the small white minority of its population. Black Rhodesians, who comprised the great majority of the population, faced extensive racially-motivated discrimination including restrictions on land ownership and employment. They were also largely excluded from political power. The Coloured (mixed-race) and Indian ethnic groups were also treated as inferior, but had more rights than blacks. (Note: In Southern Rhodesia, Coloured people (also referred to as goffals) were defined as those who were neither of exclusively African or white heritage. They included people with both a black and a white parent. The Indian community was also diverse, and included the descendants of Indian-ethnic communities who had lived in Africa for a very lengthy period as well as people from families that had migrated to southern Africa in the 19th century. The Defence Act of 1955 defined these groups as being "Coloured, Asian and Eurasian" (CAE).)

From 1962, the Southern Rhodesian government was led by the Rhodesian Front, a political party. Ian Smith served as Prime Minister from 1964 until 1979. The Rhodesian Front was deeply committed to maintaining the white community's privileged status, while the British government required majority rule before granting independence. This led to the government issuing Rhodesia's Unilateral Declaration of Independence (UDI) from the United Kingdom in November 1965, with the state becoming known as Rhodesia. UDI was illegal and caused Rhodesia to be internationally isolated and subjected to economic sanctions by other countries. (Note: The British government maintained that it was Rhodesia's legal sovereign and UDI was an act of rebellion given it had not been authorised. All other national governments agreed with this position and the United Nations Security Council passed a motion in November 1965 requesting that member states not recognise the "illegal regime". The High Court of Rhodesia ruled in 1968 that independence was legal.)

The number of whites in Southern Rhodesia increased from 82,000 in 1946 to 250,000 in 1965. Almost all of this growth was due to immigration from mainly English-speaking countries. The white population peaked at 277,000 in 1975–1976. Whites always comprised less than 5 per cent of Rhodesia's population. There were also around 30,000 Coloured and Indian people in the country. Few white migrants intended to settle permanently, and there were high rates of immigration into and emigration from Rhodesia during most years of its existence. This meant many whites did not have strong feelings of loyalty towards Rhodesia as they had migrated there intending to take up specific opportunities before moving on. The black population grew at a much faster rate than the white community between 1965 and 1980, due mainly to a higher birth rate.

UDI and Rhodesia's racial inequalities led to the Rhodesian Bush War. Guerrilla activities began in 1966, and initially involved small groups of communist-armed and trained African nationalists operating in northern areas of Rhodesia. (Note: The nationalists were political movements made up of black Rhodesians seeking majority rule. These bodies were stablished in the 1950s and by the early 1960s mainly comprised two groups; the Zimbabwe African National Union (ZANU) and Zimbabwe African People's Union (ZAPU). The Southern Rhodesian government attempted to suppress them, including by arresting their leaders. Following the Unilateral Declaration of Independence both the main nationalist groups established guerrilla forces. The ZANU formed the Zimbabwe African National Liberation Army (ZANLA) and the ZAPU the Zimbabwe People's Revolutionary Army (ZIPRA). These forces initially sought to undermine the government's control over the country in order to encourage foreign intervention to end white rule. This approach failed, and from the early 1970s the nationalists attempted to overthrow the government by defeating the Rhodesian Security Forces.) Until the early 1970s, the Rhodesian Security Forces had little difficulty defeating the guerrillas.

Rhodesia's security situation deteriorated during the mid-1970s when the nationalists were able to establish bases in neighbouring Mozambique as Portuguese rule there faltered and ended in 1975. This caused rapid growth in the insurgency which the Security Forces could not contain. In March 1978, the Rhodesian Front government entered into the Internal Settlement with pro-western nationalists. Rhodesia transitioned to a form of majority rule in June 1979 as Zimbabwe Rhodesia. The transition lacked legitimacy, as the main nationalist groups had not participated in the Internal Settlement and the Rhodesian Front retained a strong influence on the government's priorities. As a result, the war continued. By this time the conflict was costing 2,000 lives each month. International pressure and a desire by the government and nationalist groups to end the fighting led to the Lancaster House Agreement, which was signed in December 1979. Zimbabwe Rhodesia transitioned to majority rule and became independent as Zimbabwe in early 1980.

== Conscription of whites and other minority groups ==
=== Early years ===
Conscription was first implemented in Southern Rhodesia in 1928 and was initially limited to whites. In November 1940, during the Second World War, conscription was extended to young black men, with those who were called up being required to serve in the Rhodesian African Rifles (RAR). A labour conscription scheme was also introduced during 1940, with each district of the colony having to provide a specified number of black men to build airfields for the British Commonwealth Air Training Plan. From mid-1942, the Southern Rhodesian government required thousands of black men to work on white-owned farms. This scheme mainly aimed to address food shortages but also gave undercapitalised farmers access to cheap labour. District food production committees administered the farm labour conscription scheme, and it contributed to an increase in commercial agricultural production. This came at a cost of a reduction in food production by blacks for their own account. Between 50,000 and 100,000 men were conscripted for airfield or farm work over the course of the war. Due to the government's racial policies, Coloured and Indian men were not conscripted at this time. Farm labour conscription continued until 1946, when it was replaced by a scheme in which black men were forced to work on soil erosion control measures.

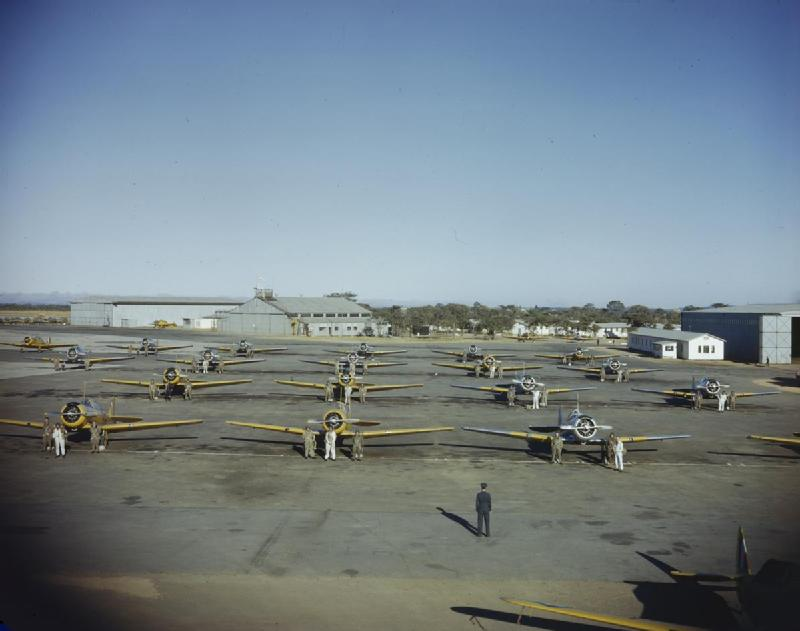
A British Commonwealth Air Training Plan airfield near the Southern Rhodesian capital of Salisbury (modern Harare). Black southern Rhodesians were conscripted to build airfields during the Second World War.

Conscription of white Southern Rhodesians continued after the Second World War. At this time, most members of the small regular army were blacks serving in the RAR; all members of this unit other than its officers were black. Part of the motivation for conscription was to ensure that all white men had military training and were available as military reservists in case the RAR became a threat to the white community. The 1957 Defence Act established a national service scheme which was applied to white, Coloured and Indian men. Following this reform, young men initially needed to undertake a six-week period of national service with the Rhodesia Regiment, during which they went through basic training. This usually occurred as soon as they left secondary education. Conscripts were then liable for part-time service for four years as reservists in the Territorial Force. At the conclusion of this period, they were assigned to the Territorial Force's Reserve with a reduced training liability but could be called up in an emergency. These different types of service remained in place until the mid-1970s.

Territorials were frequently called up between 1953 and 1963, when Southern Rhodesia formed part of the Central African Federation, usually for domestic security tasks. (Note: The Central African Federation, formally known as the Federation of Rhodesia and Nyasaland, comprised Southern Rhodesia, Northern Rhodesia (now Zambia) and Nyasaland (now Malawi). The governments of the three colonies remained existent, though the federal government had responsibility for foreign relations and defence. The armies of the three colonies were amalgamated. Southern Rhodesia dominated the federation throughout its existence. The Central African Federation ended on 31 December 1963 ahead of Northern Rhodesia and Nyasaland becoming independent with black-majority governments.) In 1960, Southern Rhodesian conscripts were deployed to what is now northern Zambia in response to the Congo Crisis. This crisis also led to the expansion of the Territorial Force, including by forming artillery batteries. During a crisis over the constitution of Northern Rhodesia in February 1961, the Southern Rhodesian government called up 5,000 Territorials for intensive training.

During the late 1950s and early 1960s the white elements of the Central African Federation's security forces were expanded in response to an official assessment that white rule would increasingly be challenged by African nationalism. As part of these changes, three additional Territorial Force battalions were raised and, from 1961, all white men aged between 18 and 50 became liable for Territorial service during emergencies. An all-white regular infantry battalion, the Rhodesian Light Infantry (RLI), was also formed that year as the Territorial units were considered too weak to defeat the RAR if it mutinied. The period of compulsory training was increased to four and a half months from the early 1960s. Conscripts were required to then serve in the Territorial Force or the British South Africa Police's (BSAP) Police Reserve. Reserve service usually involved training conducted over weekends. During 1963, the Central African Federation's Chiefs of Staff Committee proposed disbanding the RAR and replacing it with an enlarged Territorial Force due to their concerns over the loyalty of black soldiers. This was impractical due to insufficient white manpower. At this time, there were 15,000 Territorials in Southern Rhodesia. Following the break up of the Central African Federation, the Territorial Force was transferred to Southern Rhodesia, with the colony's government retaining conscription.

=== Changes during the mid-1970s ===
At the time of UDI, the period of full time national service remained at four and a half months. In 1966, the Rhodesian government decided that liability for conscription would primarily be based on residence rather than citizenship. This meant British subjects and South Africans living in Rhodesia were required to register along with Rhodesian citizens. Full-time national service was also extended to 35 weeks from April 1966. By 1967, there were eight 150-strong intakes of national servicemen annually. Twelve members of each intake were selected for further training; three as officers, three as non-commissioned officers and the others for the Army's specialist branches. At the conclusion of initial training, each intake was converted to an infantry company and deployed to an operational area for 14 weeks. The men were then posted to Territorial Force units.

By 1972, all white men aged between 18 and 25 needed to undertake nine months training with either the Army or BSAP. From the mid-1970s, the Rhodesian Government believed that shortages of white manpower were an important constraint on its war effort. The high proportion of white men who evaded conscription contributed to this; for instance, in 1973 half the eligible men who were called up managed to avoid serving in the Security Forces. Many white men failed to register for conscription and others did not report when they were called up. This led to multiple changes to reduce exemptions from conscription and opportunities to defer military service. The Security Forces also lowered their medical standards over time. Some steps were taken to address draft dodging; from 1973 military police were granted the power to require white men demonstrate they were registered for national service. At this time, around 2,000 national servicemen were called up each year.

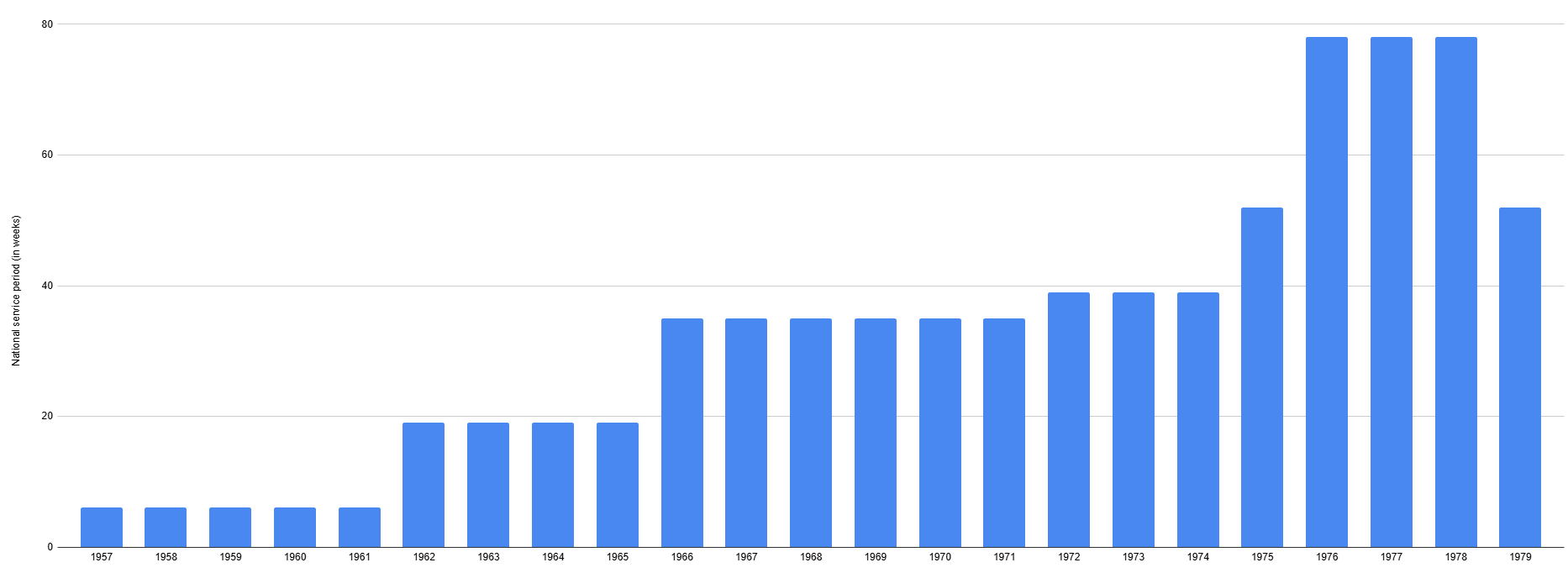
A graph illustrating the mandatory service period for national servicemen between 1957 and 1979

The manpower shortages also led to multiple changes to the periods conscripts were required to serve and the eligible age ranges. The historian Luise White has noted she and other authors have found it difficult to summarise how the conscription scheme operated from 1972 onwards as arrangements became "cumbersome". In February 1974, the Rhodesian government announced changes that aimed to expand the Army so it could respond to an increasing number of attacks by nationalist forces. These changes included doubling the number of men who were called up for national service and requiring youths to undertake national service shortly after they completed schooling. Reservists aged over 25 became liable for call up periods for up to a month. The government argued expanding the number of national servicemen would reduce the burden on reservists, as they would be called up less frequently. New white migrants to Rhodesia were granted a five-year exemption from being required to undertake national service; this was intended to bring Rhodesia's migration policy into line with comparable countries. From 1974, all non-African men aged between 18 and 25 who had not completed national service were barred from leaving Rhodesia.

In mid-1975, the national service period was extended to a full year and white reservists aged 25–30 became liable to serve for up to 59 days when called up. These changes were introduced after extensive public debate. The call up period was soon increased to 84 days. White men aged 30–38 were obliged to serve for shorter periods. Also in 1975, the 'grace period' during which new immigrants to Rhodesia were exempt from conscription was reduced to two years. The continued existence of an exemption for recent migrants was criticised by some Rhodesians. The Territorial Force's Reserve was merged into the main body of the force over 1975; by this time there was little difference between the requirements placed on Territorials and members of its Reserve.

=== 1976 reforms ===
Following the 1975 withdrawal of a large South African Police contingent that had undertaken counterinsurgency tasks in northern Rhodesia, the conscription system was intensified in 1976 to make up for this loss of manpower. (Note: The white-minority apartheid South African government provided important economic and military support for Rhodesia throughout the country's existence. South African Police were deployed to Rhodesia in 1967 to assist with counter-insurgency tasks. This force comprised over 2,000 men in the late 1960s and was expanded in the early 1970s. It may have included some South African Defence Force personnel. The contingent was withdrawn in 1975 as part of efforts by the South African government to arrange a ceasefire in Rhodesia.) On 1 May, the government announced reservists would be subject to "continuous call up" for the Territorial Force for three years following their completion of national service. This meant the Army no longer had to specify the duration of active service periods for these men when they were called up; this change damaged morale in the Security Forces. Further changes were announced in May, including additional obligations for reservists aged 25 to 38 and the extension of the national service period to 18 months. Young men who were going onto university had to serve for 24 months as they were exempt from reserve duties during their studies. This change applied to men undertaking national service at the time, with their period of active service being extended by six months. On 14 May, it was announced all exemptions which had been granted from conscription would be cancelled and stricter criteria for assessing such requests would be applied.

The National Service Act was amended during July and August 1976 to formalise these reforms. This saw further changes, including a requirement that boys aged 16 and over register for conscription (though the call up age remained at 18) and reforms to the administration of the conscription scheme. In late July a Rhodesian Front backbencher proposed white men who registered for conscription be required to wear a dog tag at all times to deter draft dodging; this was not enacted. The National Service Act was also amended in 1976 to ban boys aged 16 years and over from leaving Rhodesia until they had completed national service. The government announced continuous call up would be abolished in November 1976, but in its place men who had completed national service would be called up for three months. The changes to the conscription system in 1976 effectively put the country on a war footing and represented a significant burden on the white population.

=== Final years of the Bush War ===
There were further significant changes during 1977. From April, reservists aged under 38 were obliged to serve for up to 190 days annually. Men aged between 38 and 50 became liable for call up, and were required to serve for 70 days a year. Those aged over 50 were encouraged to volunteer for the Police Reserve, which had an obligation of at least 42 days of service annually. Exceptions from national service and reserve duties were reduced. While 38 to 50 year olds were meant to be assigned to the BSAP and other security units, those assessed as being in the highest fitness category were posted to the Army. Following considerable debate, self-employed men also became liable for short periods of service in the Police Reserve. In September all student deferments were cancelled, with white students being forced to end their studies and serve in the Security Forces. Also from 1977, employers were required to report on whether their white, Coloured and Indian employees were serving in the Security Forces. During the same year, a bonus payment was introduced for national servicemen who volunteered for a further year of full-time service. White game keepers at national parks near Rhodesia's borders were exempted from call ups from the late 1970s as the patrols they conducted to monitor wildlife also generated useful intelligence on guerrilla activities.

Reservists aged between 25 and 38 were the cohort most frequently called up during the late 1970s, and typically rotated between six week periods in the Security Forces followed by six weeks in their civilian occupations. During nationalist offensives, they were often required to rotate between their military and civilian roles every four weeks. From 1978, men aged 38 to 49 were subject to up to 10 weeks service annually in blocks of up to two weeks; in practice though, only those with the most military experience were required to perform active duty. In January that year, the 'grace period' for new migrants was reduced to six months. The national service period was decreased from 18 to 12 months from October. The Rhodesian Government considered greatly expanding the professional Army and ending the call up in 1978, but this was found to be impractical and too expensive.

In January 1979, the call up was further expanded when men aged 50 to 60 were required to serve as guards in cities for 42 days a year. Only 20 percent reported for duty. In January 1979, the government considered asking men in vital occupations, who were exempt from conscription, to volunteer for active service on weekends and after hours on weekdays. In late 1979, the Zimbabwe Rhodesia government sought to reduce call ups of older men to placate the white minority. However, the worsening war situation required the continuation of large scale call ups.

=== Coloured and Indian conscripts ===
For most of the Bush War, Coloured and Indian reservists were paid less than their white peers and experienced other forms of discrimination. For instance, they were not permitted to become officers until 1977. Coloured and Indian national servicemen were trained separately from whites, and received shorter periods of training than them. This led to them having low morale and being less effective than whites. After completing training, Coloured and Indian national servicemen were usually assigned non-combat supply and transport positions and posted to racially segregated units led by white officers. Coloured and Indian men who volunteered to remain in the regular Army at the end of their national service period were only offered one year contracts and continued to be paid less than whites.

Coloured and Indian conscripts generally did not wish to be mustered into the Security Forces. During their service many sought equal conditions to whites. In 1974, some took strike action in an attempt to force the Army to end racial segregation. Three years later, 500 signed a petition that protested against the racially discriminatory elements of the conscription system and called for an end to conscription for Coloured and Indian men. The government rejected the petition, arguing that as these population groups had the same right to vote as whites they needed to have identical obligations. The most senior Coloured soldier in the army, a Warrant Officer 1, resigned in protest.

From 1973, Coloured and Indian reservists, along with some white reservists, were assigned to the Reserve Holding Unit (RHU). This was a battalion-sized formation used to protect infrastructure across Rhodesia. The next year several protection companies were formed from Coloured and Indian personnel. These units also protected infrastructure as well as government buildings and white-owned farms. Whites regarded these defensive duties as boring and suitable for a population group they did not fully trust. After 1978, Coloured and Indian reservists were generally posted to the Rhodesian Defence Regiment (RDR), which had been formed by amalgamating the RHU and protection companies. They made up most of its personnel, the remainder generally being national servicemen who had been assessed as relatively ineffective and elderly white reservists. As this unit needed to be rapidly raised and fielded, its members received little training.

The pay and conditions of Coloured and Indian personnel were not equalised with those of white reservists until the final period of the war. Coloured men faced stronger incentives to report for national service and call ups than whites. This was because Coloured households were typically less well off than whites and men could not afford to risk being imprisoned for draft evasion.

=== Post-war ===
The 1980 Southern Rhodesian general election ended in victory for the nationalist ZANU–PF party led by Robert Mugabe. Many conscripts returned home after the election result was announced in early March. The liability on conscripts who were called up was reduced from 25 March 1980. Several other changes were made: 50 to 60 year olds ceased to be liable for conscription, 38 to 49 year olds only needed to provide 15 days of active service and 30 to 38 year olds had their requirement reduced to 30 days. The Guard Force and RDR were disbanded, along with several Army units. Many whites emigrated to South Africa.

Mugabe considered the retention of conscription necessary "until the outstanding dissident element had been rounded up", by which he meant members of the Zimbabwe People's Revolutionary Army (one of the two main nationalist groups during the Bush War) who opposed his rule. Soon after the transition to Zimbabwe, between 250 and 300 Territorial administration and pay staff were called up for a week to register nationalist fighters on the Army's pay roll. White conscripts formed a small part of the force that defeated former Zimbabwe People's Revolutionary Army personnel in the 1981 Entumbane uprising. Conscription was subsequently abolished, and as of 1983 the Zimbabwe National Army was made up entirely of volunteers. The Rhodesian-era National Service Act remained in force as of 1997, with the Zimbabwean government informing the United Nations it would provide the legal basis for implementing conscription if a decision to do so was ever made.

== Conscription of black Rhodesians ==
=== Exemption from conscription ===
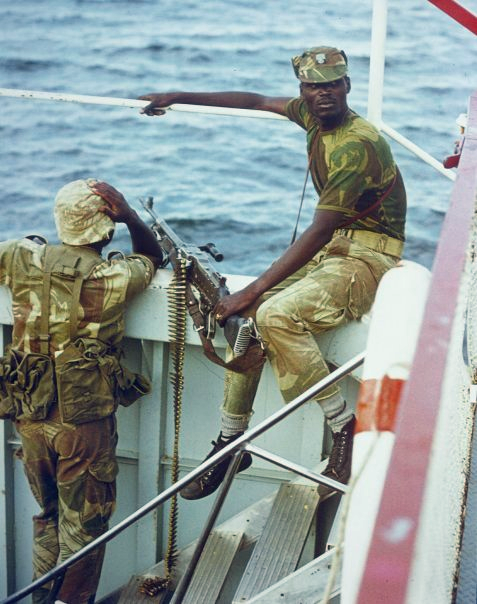
Two members of the Rhodesian African Rifles in 1976. At this time, all black members of this unit were volunteers.

Many black Rhodesians served with the Rhodesian Security Forces, but until the last months of the war this was almost entirely voluntary. When national service was implemented in the 1950s, the government did not consider conscripting blacks. There were concerns at this time over the loyalty of black soldiers to the white-dominated regime. The RAR was one of the Army's two regular infantry battalions at the time of UDI, the other being the all-white RLI. The government's concerns over the loyalty of its black troops proved unfounded and the RAR was highly effective against the nationalist guerrillas. As of 1978, approximately two-thirds of the 10,000 regulars in the Rhodesian Army were black, and more had applied to serve but been turned away. Relatively high rates of pay; the provision of health care, education and housing; and loyalty to the government sufficed to attract enough black volunteers. This meant the government did not see any need to conscript blacks until a transition towards majority rule began to gain pace in the late 1970s.

The amendments to the National Security Act in 1976 gave the government the power to conscript black men who were undertaking an apprenticeship or university studies, but this was not done immediately. The Rhodesian Government considered conscripting black Rhodesians at various times, and serious proposals were put forward from around 1977. There were concerns within the civil service and Army over extending conscription in this way. This was due to a belief that many blacks would refuse to serve and some of those who were conscripted would be loyal to the nationalists. Overall though, the Army favoured conscripting blacks as they could be paid less than white reservists and were likely to be just as effective in battle.

The first time black Rhodesians were conscripted was in October 1977, when approximately 50 doctors were called up for national service. Some reportedly resigned rather than serve in the Security Forces. Other doctors told the media they would also resign if called up. These objections led to the near-abandonment of efforts to conscript black doctors. In early 1978, the Rhodesian government indicated black apprentices would become liable for national service in the future.

=== Introduction of conscription ===
In late 1978, the Rhodesian government decided that black men aged between 18 and 25 would be required to undertake national service. This change arose from the Internal Settlement, with whites considering conscription unfair if it was not extended to blacks given the country was now, at least in theory, racially integrated. The government hoped this change would help convince foreign observers the Internal Settlement represented a genuine transition from racial discrimination. As almost all able bodied white men were in the Security Forces, conscripting blacks was also considered necessary to continue the war. Rhodesian Front members of parliament had previously opposed conscripting black men due to fears they could revolt, but now supported this in the belief they would want to fight for the new government. Abel Muzorewa, who headed the Zimbabwe Rhodesia government from its establishment, agreed with extending conscription after being pressured by Rhodesian Prime Minister Ian Smith. Ken Flower, the head of the Rhodesian Central Intelligence Organisation (CIO), wrote in his memoirs that the CIO had strongly advised against conscripting blacks as doing so would undermine support for the transitional government.

In October 1978, the Rhodesian government published its regulations for conscripting black men. All members of this cohort aged between 18 and 25 were required to register for national service prior to 1 December that year. Those who had at least three years of secondary education or were undertaking an apprenticeship would become liable for a one-year national service period from early 1979. Approximately 25,000 men met these criteria. The Rhodesian Army lacked the ability to train the very large numbers of black conscripts that would have resulted from a broader national service requirement. Some senior Army officers wanted to create a very large army made up largely of black soldiers led by whites had the war continued; this was considered impractical by Combined Operations, the headquarters responsible for coordinating the war effort.

Young black people in Bulawayo and other locations protested the imposition of conscription, arguing they were being forced to fight for the white minority against the country's legitimate representatives. Police rapidly suppressed these protests. In the town of Gwelo, seven 17-year-old boys were sentenced to be caned for organising a protest against conscription at their secondary school. Thousands of black men did not register for conscription, even though this could lead to a large fine or imprisonment for up to five years. The government instructed firms to not pay black employees who did not register.

Most black men boycotted conscription after it began in January 1979. Of the 1,544 who were called up, only 300 reported. Hundreds of those who did not report were prosecuted for draft evasion. Historian Matthew Preston has written that the failure of this call up did not affect the war effort as there was "no shortage of volunteers" and it "was essentially a political exercise aimed at placating a white public that objected to whites-only conscription continuing now that 'majority rule' had been agreed". The government claimed that a much higher proportion of later intakes of black conscripts reported. All educated black men aged between 16 and 60 became liable for conscription in August 1979, but this was not fully implemented.

Black conscripts were paid less than whites and were posted to the RAR rather than being integrated into units with white soldiers. The Army established a fourth battalion of the RAR following the imposition of conscription on blacks.

Some black Rhodesians were forced to serve in the Security Force Auxiliaries from 1978, with recruitment for these forces being partially undertaken by press gangs. The Security Force Auxiliaries were private armies raised by the Zimbabwe African National Union and United African National Council, both of which formed part of the Zimbabwe Rhodesia government.

The historian Peter McLaughlin has described the arrangements to conscript black men as "cautious and limited", as the white authorities did not want to relinquish power and anticipated there would be resistance to this measure among the black majority. Defence commentators Greg Mills and Grahame Wilson have written that "the failure to recruit larger numbers of black troops into the army earlier must be viewed as a key mistake by the Smith regime". These authors have also criticised the Rhodesian government's decisions to address manpower shortages by increasing conscription requirements on other population groups instead of recruiting blacks. The historian M.T. Howard has attributed the government's reluctance to recruit more black soldiers until late in the war to the racism of Rhodesian Front ministers and senior Army officers.

== Administration of the conscription system ==
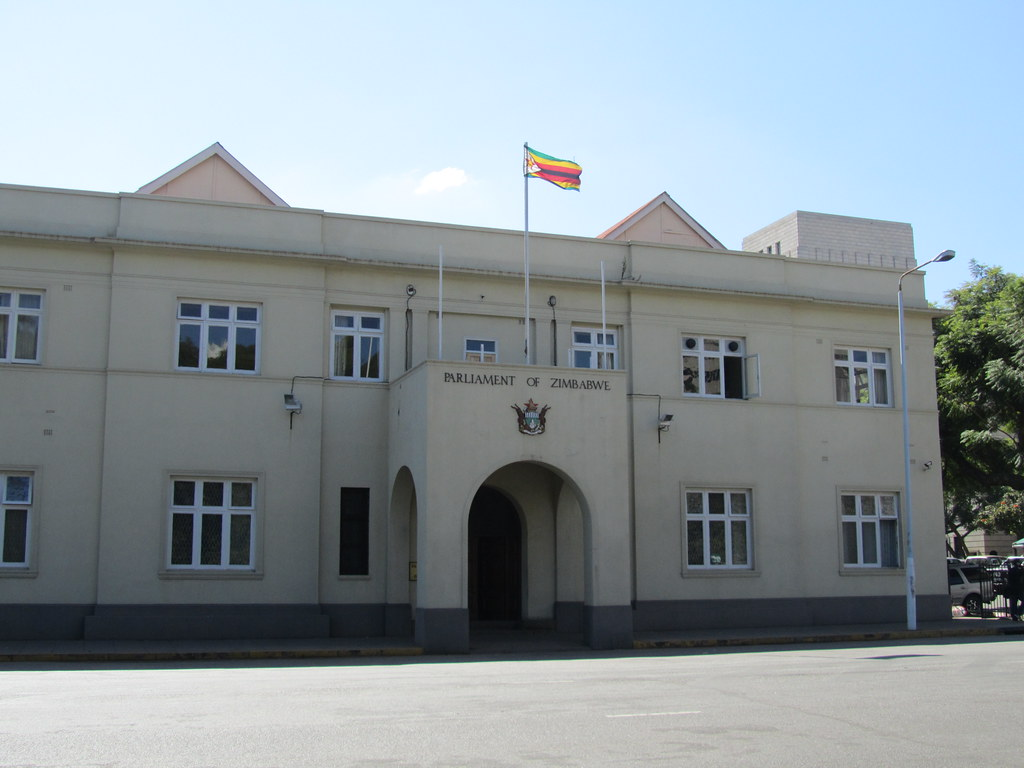
The building that served as the Rhodesian Parliament House

By early 1976, there were growing concerns among the white Rhodesian community over how the conscription system was being administered. This included concerns over draft evasion and inequitable periods of service. In April, the government formed a subcommittee led by Minister of Co-ordination Reginald Cowper to consider improvements. It recommended establishing a government agency to administer conscription and computerising the call up system. The Cabinet accepted these recommendations, and on 17 May 1976 the Directorate of Manpower was formed. From this time, the minister regularly determined the number of conscripts to call up based on advice from the Security Forces and the directorate then selected the men who were required to serve. Commanders in the Security Forces had discretion to select which members of their units where were called up, and most frequently selected the most effective personnel. The government also accepted an offer from a computer company to develop a database, and 200 people volunteered to input paper records into it. Computerisation was not successful, as the records were often out of date.

Despite these changes, concerns over the conscription system continued to increase. The government was able to refute allegations of sportsmen and homosexuals being able to evade conscription, but there was a perception the sons of prominent citizens were not called up. Some members of parliament criticised the administration of the system, citing examples of conscripts' skills being wasted and men who were called up being sent to locations where conscripts were readily available. The business community also regarded the administration of the scheme as poor. Apprentices were particularly affected by the intensification of conscription requirements, as many were unable to complete their qualifications as they were called up during exam periods.

The increased conscription requirements announced during 1976 and early 1977 and maladministration of the conscription system led to a backlash from the business and farming communities. The business community protested against 38 to 50 year olds being called up, citing examples of firms being crippled when almost all their male white staff were required to serve in the Security Forces simultaneously. The criticism led to Cowper's resignation and further changes to the conscription system's administration. A National Manpower Board was established as an independent body with the power to grant exemptions from conscription, including on economic grounds. It was also responsible for advising the government on the best use of manpower. Local exemption boards continued to operate, but could only grant deferments of up to 90 days. Responsibility for administering the National Service Act was transferred to the Ministry of Labour, which was redesignated the Ministry of Manpower, Industrial Relations, and Social Affairs. Rowan Cronjé was appointed as minister for this portfolio, and took a more collaborative approach with businesses than Cowper had.

Problems with the conscription scheme continued, with the extension of call up requirements to self-employed farmers in 1977 being poorly implemented. In response, eleven Rhodesian Front backbenchers criticised the scheme in Parliament during October 1977. Cronjé argued the problems were due to human error rather than systematic factors, and noted five different government agencies were involved. He acknowledged this had led to many reservists not being called up while peers were required to spend a large amount of time in active service. He implemented reforms over late 1977 which sought to provide greater predictability of call up requirements and spread the burden more fairly. In practice though, the scheme remained unfair and confusing as Security Forces unit commanders were still able to frequently select their most effective personnel. The Security Forces also found the conscription arrangements administratively burdensome, and by 1977 many officers reported they spent more time handling call-ups than they did on operations.

The Rhodesian government lacked a formal mechanism to track down men who did not report for military service. While desertion could be punished by death, this was not enforced. Most officers were unconcerned about men in their unit evading call ups or deserting. As late as 1977 the Army did not keep records of deserters.

There was tension between the Security Forces and government over the administration of the conscription scheme in the war's last years. The Security Forces believed too many exemptions were granted and enforcement of call up notices was lax. In late 1978, Combined Operations proposed that the civilian boards which assessed requests for exemptions be disbanded and the Security Forces take on this function. Combined Operations also wanted to make ignoring call up notices illegal, with this being enforced by military police and the BSAP, and advocated for reforms which would have required more men to serve. The Minister for Manpower strongly rejected these proposals on the grounds that the Security Forces were not using their manpower effectively and were more generous in granting exemptions than the civilian boards. However, he agreed that exemptions boards should include a retired military officer.

Pay rates for conscripts remained constant in real terms between 1955 and 1973. By the end of this period, national servicemen and Territorials were typically being paid much less than regulars. A rationalisation exercise during 1973 led to all white conscripts being moved onto the same pay scale. Married men and men with children received additional allowances. There were separate pay scales for white, Coloured and Indian and black personnel. Coloured and Indians received less than whites and blacks were on the lowest salaries. As of 1973, the most senior black soldier in the Army, a regimental sergeant major, was paid less than what white privates received. The differences in pay rates were reduced in the late 1970s, but whites continued to be paid much more than blacks; in 1977 white national servicemen who had completed initial training received twice the pay of black privates. Pay rates for all conscripts were equalised in June 1979.

Women were not subject to conscription, despite proposals to institute this. The Rhodesian government argued it could not afford the costs of establishing a female military unit. White women could serve in the Security Forces on a voluntary basis (in the BSAP and the Rhodesian Women's Service from 1975) and the roles available to them expanded from the mid-1970s.

== Impact of conscription on the Rhodesian Security Forces ==
=== Rhodesian Army and Air Force ===
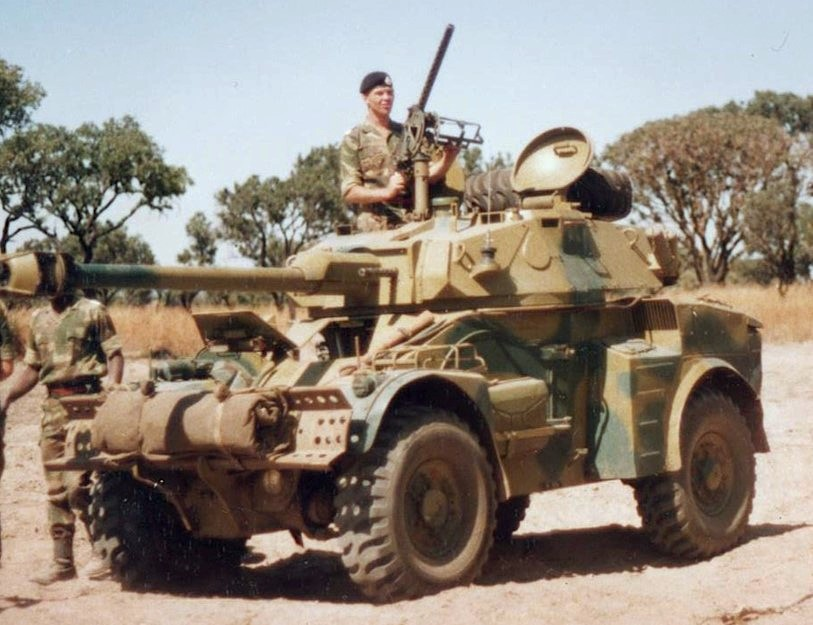
One of the Eland armoured cars that were operated by the Rhodesian Armoured Car Regiment, a unit mainly manned by reservists

Throughout the Rhodesian Front's period in power, it was aware that Rhodesia's white population was insufficient to support a large enough standing army to meet the country's needs. As the government did not want to recruit large numbers of black troops, it increasingly relied on white conscripts to man the Security Forces. The relatively large size of the Rhodesian Security Forces, most of whom were reservists, contributed to the government's judgement in 1965 that a Unilateral Declaration of Independence was viable. This also deterred a British military intervention to quash Rhodesian independence. At the time of UDI, the Rhodesian Security Forces included around 20,000 white personnel. The British government believed that intervention would lead to armed conflict. There was considerable opposition to UDI and Smith's government in the regular elements of the Security Forces and it was unclear whether black personnel would fight. Support for independence was much stronger among reservists, and due to their numbers this provided a key source of support for the government. The British military was unable to rapidly deploy a force capable of disarming the Rhodesian Security Forces and then administering the colony. This led it to recommend against intervention. The British government accepted this advice.

The expansion of conscription enabled the Rhodesian Army to grow in size. From 1973, national servicemen were posted to the Army's regular units as well as independent companies and the support services. The Rhodesia Regiment lost its training role and its battalions became fully manned by reservists. The number of battalions in the regiment eventually grew to eight, with a total nominal strength of 15,000 men. The elite Special Air Service, Selous Scouts and Grey's Scouts, also included elements manned by reservists from 1973 onwards. Most members of the Rhodesian Intelligence Corps were reservists, including its commanding officer. The Rhodesian Armoured Car Regiment was mainly manned by reservists. Historian Glenn Cross has written that national servicemen and reservists staffed the Rhodesian chemical and biological weapons program that was active between 1976 and 1979. Relations between the different categories of personnel were not always harmonious, with the regulars who made up the majority of the RLI treating conscripts who were posted to the unit with disdain.

The Rhodesian Air Force was opposed to the call up scheme and only used reservists to protect its aircraft. The Air Force believed conscripts could not be trained to perform technical tasks. Most of the Rhodesian Air Force's airfield security guards were national servicemen or reservist conscripts. The Air Force also had a Volunteer Reserve made up of men who volunteered for at least three years' service as reservists; national servicemen administered this scheme.

=== Paramilitary units ===
From the early 1970s, all white men aged between 38 and 60 were required to serve with the Police Reserve. Some younger conscripts who were judged unsuitable for the Army were also posted to this force. Farmers served in the Police Reserve rather than the Army. Men who undertook their national service with the BSAP underwent similar basic training as those selected for the Army and were then transferred.

The Police Reserve had two components, 'A' Reserve and the Field Reserve. The 'A' Reserve undertook crime prevention tasks. The Field Reserve was mainly used to guard farms and key infrastructure and protect convoys travelling by road. Field Reserve units were usually poorly trained, led and equipped. Several of the Police Anti-Terrorist Units mainly comprised reservists; these forces undertook counterinsurgency tasks including two-week long deployments to rural areas where they were involved in combat alongside the Army. At its peak, the BSAP comprised approximately 11,000 regulars (most of whom were black) and between 30,000 and 35,000 reservists.

National servicemen were allocated to the Ministry of Internal Affairs from the start of 1975. These men were trained to administer and protect the protected villages which the Rhodesian Government had forced many black people to move into. The national serviceman (called a 'vedette') was often the sole white official in the village and led 15-20 black district security assistants. The young and inexperienced vedettes often struggled, with this contributing to the poor results of the protected village program. From late 1975, reservists aged between 25 and 38 were assigned to this role, leading to better results. The Internal Affairs teams suffered a relatively high casualty rate.

From 1975, some conscripts were posted to the newly created Guard Force. These were mainly young white national servicemen who had been assessed as low quality, as well as elderly reservists. The Guard Force took over responsibility for many of the protected villages from the Ministry of Internal Affairs, with half of the ministry's allocation of national servicemen being reassigned to the force. Its personnel received little training and often committed crimes against the residents of the protected villages. The Guard Force was expanded from 1977 and took on a more active role that included conducting patrols and ambushes. From 1978, it began to protect white-owned farms and key infrastructure. The force had a strength of 7,000 men in late 1979.

The RHU and protection companies were not effective. The RHU was unable to stop nationalist attacks on farms and tourist sites, though this may have been due to it being too small. This unit and the protection companies also failed to prevent attacks on the security forces' bases, roads and railways as they were outnumbered by the nationalist units they encountered.

The RDR, which most Coloured and Indian conscripts were posted to from 1978, was poorly trained and equipped and had a reputation for indiscipline. As the security situation deteriorated for Rhodesia, Coloured and Indian personnel assigned to protection units faced increasing dangers. They were also typically deployed to areas of the country with uncomfortably hot climates so white troops did not need to serve there. Members of the RDR believed they were treated as cannon fodder, which deepened their opposition to the Rhodesian Front government. Few Coloured or Indian troops wanted to fight and many were sympathetic to the nationalists. This led some to collaborate with them. The RDR achieved some successes in fighting the nationalists and protecting infrastructure, but was overall not effective.

Many Security Force Auxiliary units eventually came under the control of the Security Forces, but they were generally ill disciplined and ineffective. They nevertheless made an important contribution to security for the 1979 Rhodesian general election and fought well in some districts. Some of the conscripted members of these units adopted a live and let live approach with the nationalist forces when they were posted to operational areas. Those conscripted from urban areas also performed poorly when assigned to protect rural communities, with some committing serious crimes such as murder, rape and torture.

=== Impact of conscription on the Bush War ===
The fundamental limitation of the conscription system throughout the Bush War was that Rhodesia's white population was insufficient to meet the government's needs for personnel to counter the nationalists. This problem was worsened by high rates of emigration. The nationalists could draw on a larger population and support base than the Rhodesian Security Forces, and this caused the security situation for Rhodesia to worsen over the 1970s. During the late 1960s and early 1970s, the nationalists press-ganged black Rhodesians, many of whom handed themselves in to the government. From 1973 the nationalists were able to sustain their forces solely through volunteers.

While many contemporary European countries had longer periods of national service, often lasting for two years, this was impractical for Rhodesia due to the due to the small size of the white population and their importance in the economy. By the late 1970s, the Rhodesian Security Forces had access to relatively large numbers of personnel, but due to economic constraints could only mobilise a minority of them at any given time. In general, around 25,000 men were on active service. The size of the Security forces peaked in early 1979 when around 60,000 men (including Security Force Auxiliaries) were mobilised to provide security for the election held that April. At the end of the conflict, the nationalist forces comprised 37,000 fighters and were preparing to transition from guerrilla tactics to conventional warfare.

The Rhodesian Security Forces were better trained and more effective than the nationalists. White school leavers were typically well educated and had undertaken military training as part of their schooling. Following enlistment, they received further training that was generally effective. The Army struggled to find enough instructors to train reservists in the Rhodesia Regiment, though standards in its units gradually improved. As a result, the Territorial Force was considerably less effective than the Army's regular units.

At the start of the Bush War, the insurgency was small enough to be mainly handled by the BSAP. The regular army and specialist Territorial units were only occasionally involved. The role of the military increased over time, and by 1967 large numbers of Territorials were regularly needed. There were differences in how Territorial Force and regular Army units were deployed. The Territorials were generally used to patrol Rhodesia's borders. When they encountered nationalist forces, more capable regular units were usually brought in to fight them. Regular units such as the Special Air Service and Selous Scouts conducted raids into neighbouring countries. Howard has written that "it is therefore apt to speak of two Rhodesian armies" given the considerable difference between the capabilities and activities of the Territorial Force and regular units. While BSAP and Army units were usually able to defeat nationalist forces, they lacked the manpower needed to assert control over much of the country.

Conscription gave the Security Forces access to reservists with a wide range of skills, including those they had gained through vocational education and as part of their civilian occupations. Despite this, reservists were often assigned tasks that did not make good use of their capabilities. By 1977, the Security Forces were struggling to administer the national service scheme and equip the large number of conscripts. The Police Reserve could provide weapons, radios and transport vehicles to less than half the number of conscripts it was able to call up. The Guard Force lacked the staff needed to administer regular call-ups. Many soldiers believed the Army and the broader war effort were highly inefficient.

Military discipline among national servicemen was often relaxed and some refused to wear standard uniforms. Following the Internal Settlement, many white conscripts were unwilling to risk their lives for a multi-racial government. This led to some evading active service by getting sympathetic doctors to provide them with grounds for a medical exemption. There is also evidence that by 1979 many conscripts were exhausted from active service and saw the war as futile. Despite these tensions, white conscripts did not mutiny or 'frag' their officers.

== Social and economic effects ==
=== Social impact ===
The national service scheme was supported by most white Rhodesians. Parents typically expected their sons to undertake national service and draft dodging was seen as dishonourable. These views were common across families regardless of political opinions, as national service was often seen as being in the interests of Rhodesia rather than the Rhodesian Front government or the cause of sustaining white minority rule. As a result, conscription was a major element in the lives of white Rhodesian men. The white community was less supportive of obligations placed on conscripts after they had completed their national service period.

Most young men undertook national service because they were legally required to. Some were enthusiastic about serving in the Security Forces while others were uncommitted. For those who had grown up in Rhodesia, the school system had prepared them for national service by requiring a high level of discipline. There was little sympathy for conscientious objectors from conscription, and none of the 34 applicants for this status in 1972 were approved. Men who refused to undertake national service due to their beliefs were gaoled or fined. In October 1973, a magistrate sentenced a juvenile to be caned for conscientious objection. After he had been punished, the penalty was criticised by five judges of the High Court and formally rescinded. From June 1977 men who lodged a legal challenge against the conscription system were required to serve in the Army until they won their case. By 1978, it was an offence to advocate for conscientious objection. The final iteration of the National Service Act that was in force from 1979 enabled men to apply for an exemption from conscription if "his bona fide religious beliefs inhibit his rendering National Service".

The increasing requirements of the Security Forces in the final years of the war were considered unreasonable by white Rhodesian families. They placed strain on conscripts' families and contributed to a high divorce rate. Many conscripts developed post-traumatic stress disorder. These issues led to more widespread evasion of call up requirements. Older men were particularly likely to evade their obligations by not registering for conscription. Those who reported were often frustrated to be assigned unimportant roles. The number of conscripts who committed suicide also increased over time. Extending the call up to older men in the last months of the war caused many Rhodesians to conclude the war was lost.

=== Economic impact ===
Calling up men for military service adversely affected the Rhodesian economy. Peter McLaughlin, an academic at the University of Rhodesia who later became a historian, noted in 1978 that "an extremely small minority is burdened with providing the manpower to maintain the economy on which White privilege is based, while simultaneously drawing on the same body of manpower to defend the system of privilege". Firms and industry associations expressed strong concerns over the absence of young white men, who were often employed as managers in factories. Many business operated by sole traders failed due to their call up obligations. This damaged the Rhodesian economy, which was also faltering due to global economic trends and the impact of sanctions. National servicemen were commonly concerned about the impact call up periods would have on their careers once they became reservists.

The extension of the call up to men aged between 38 and 50 was particularly harmful, as they often held important positions in businesses. Some companies paid their employees who had been called up the difference between their usual wage and what they received from the Security Forces, and this became more burdensome when senior staff members became liable for active service. As black workers were not subject to call ups, many firms developed a preference for hiring them over whites. Women also frequently filled vacancies caused by men being absent which allowed them to take on more significant roles in the economy. Many companies required their available employees to work for 10 to 12 hours a day to make up for shortages of workers.

== Conscription and emigration ==
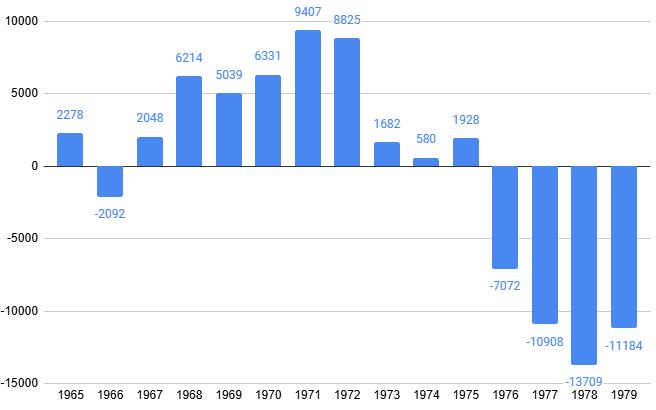
Net migration of white people in Rhodesia between 1965 and 1979

=== Migration policies ===
The increasing burden of conscription on white Rhodesian men forced them to make a decision to remain in Rhodesia or emigrate. Staying would require more frequent call-ups to fight in a war that appeared lost. Many white men and their families became unwilling to accept the burdens call ups imposed. This choice was typically not available to Coloured Rhodesians, as they did not hold foreign citizenship and families could not afford to send their sons outside the country.

The Rhodesian government was aware conscription was causing white men to emigrate from the country and attempted to balance this against the Security Forces' needs. All changes to national service requirements were debated within the government due to the impact they would have on emigration. During the late 1970s, emigration was usually discussed during meetings of the Rhodesian government's Manpower Committee. As one way of limiting the impact of conscription on emigration, in 1977 the Manpower Committee decided the terms of military service should be obscured. This was only partly successful, as the increasing requirements continued to motivate white men to depart the country.

To expand the pool of white manpower, the Rhodesian government encouraged immigration. Efforts were made to attract South Africans and other white minority groups in Africa as well as people from the UK and further afield. This was successful in the late 1960s and early 1970s but the worsening security situation partially deterred migration after this time. From 1973 the government began to actively recruit foreign volunteers for the Security Forces. Men with previous military experience, and especially war veterans, were preferred. It was expected that most of the volunteers would not settle in Rhodesia. As historians have found it difficult to access Rhodesian records, it is not known exactly how many foreigners volunteered, but it is estimated they numbered around 1,500 to 2,000 in the late 1970s. The Rhodesian Army accepted foreign volunteers largely out of necessity. By augmenting the size of the Security Forces, the volunteers allowed the Rhodesian government to extend the duration of the war.

The Rhodesian government also attempted to reduce the numbers of white men of military age leaving the country. In 1974, it became an offence for men to depart Rhodesia after being called up. At around this time, opportunities to travel or study outside of Rhodesia were reduced and the government asked South Africa to extradite draft dodgers. Later that year, non-black Rhodesian men aged between 18 and 25 who had not completed national service were banned from emigrating. The Herald newspaper compared the new restrictions to the Berlin Wall and stated that the government was "lowering the portcullis to keep civilian soldiers in against their will". From 1976, the South African government began deporting white Rhodesians for technical violations of immigration rules, though it publicly denied having a deal with Rhodesia to deny residence to white men of military age. From 1977, the sons of adults who were preparing to emigrate needed to complete national service if they were called up before their parents completed the necessary paperwork. These restrictions led many white Rhodesians to feel like prisoners, and encouraged them to emigrate when they could. Immigration into Rhodesia was also affected.

In October 1976, the British government made a commitment to sympathetically consider requests for visas from British subjects who were seeking to evade conscription requirements in Rhodesia. However, as of 1977 the British Home Office did not automatically grant asylum to men seeking to enter the UK to avoid fighting for the Rhodesian government, with applications being assessed on their individual merits. A Rhodesian conscript told The Guardian that year his request for asylum had been rejected as he was considered a supporter of the Rhodesian government. The rationale for this assessment was that he was serving in the armed forces.

=== Impact on the white population ===
During the late 1970s, Rhodesia experienced what historian Josiah Brownell has described as "a self-sustaining cycle of increased service demands, increased white emigration, and a worsening military situation". The declining white population contributed to the increased military obligations on those who remained, which in turn led to further emigration. The Manpower Committee noted reservists who were required to undertake long periods of service were particularly likely to emigrate. Following considerable internal debate, in 1978 the Rhodesian government concluded the white population was insufficient to meet the Security Forces' needs and further increasing their national service requirements would be counter-productive.

The declining white population hindered Rhodesia's war effort during the last years of the Bush War. By 1977, most of the Rhodesia Regiment's infantry companies were well below their authorised strengths. The expected size of the 1978 intake of national servicemen also had to be reduced by 27 percent. The imposition of conscription on black men failed to raise enough personnel to meet the government's needs. Manpower shortages led to the abandonment of some intended military measures and forced others to be delayed or reduced in scope. The Security Forces were unable to undertake large-scale operations, and mainly used special forces style tactics. Insufficient manpower also undermined the protected village program, and meant plans to garrison the Tribal Trust Lands could not be enacted. Brownell has noted the "deteriorating security situation, largely as a result of white manpower constraints, finally forced the regime to negotiate its own demise".
