= Special forces of Rhodesia =

The special forces of Rhodesia were elite units that formed part of the Rhodesian Army during the Rhodesian Bush War. From 1977 they reported directly to the Commander, Combined Operations Lieutenant General Peter Walls.

The Rhodesian military considered two units to be special forces: the Special Air Service and the Selous Scouts. Combined Operations also regarded the Grey's Scouts mounted infantry unit as an elite unit, but it was not as well trained or effective as the SAS or Selous Scouts. The historian Charles D. Melson has written that the Army's specialist tracking units were related to the special forces.

== History ==
=== Special Air Service ===
The Special Air Service (SAS) was the first Rhodesian special forces unit. It was formed in 1961 as part of the establishment of an all-white component of the Southern Rhodesian military that also included raising the Rhodesian Light Infantry. The formation of these white units aimed to guard against the Rhodesian African Rifles (RAR) and other black units becoming a threat to white minority rule. The SAS was affiliated with the British 22 Special Air Service Regiment until Rhodesia's Unilateral Declaration of Independence (UDI) in November 1965.

UDI led to the outbreak of the Rhodesian Bush War, in which African nationalist groups sought to end white rule. From 1966 the SAS collaborated with the Central Intelligence Organisation (CIO) to attack industrial facilities, bridges and nationalist bases in Zambia. The CIO also recruited ex-SAS personnel.

In 1969 a Tracking Wing was established under the oversight of the SAS to provide instructors in tracking for other Rhodesian Units. A Tracker Combat Unit made up of reservist Territorial Force personnel was also formed. From 1973 the SAS began attacking targets in Mozambique.

=== Pseudo-operations ===
The British South Africa Police's Special Branch began pseudo-operations to collect evidence using personnel posing as nationalists in 1966. Due to the worsening security situation for Rhodesia, including the loss of control of some parts of the state to nationalists, Special Branch and the military began establishing teams of pseudo operators in early 1973. The military teams included members of the SAS and RAR.

These efforts were considered successful, and led to the establishment of the Selous Scouts in November 1973 to conduct pseudo-operations on a larger scale. This was an Army unit that operated under the direction of Special Branch within Rhodesia. The Selous Scouts included black and white soldiers, though all of the officers were whites until shortly before the end of the war. The Tracking Wing and Tracker Combat Unit were merged into the Selous Scouts in 1974 with the unit providing training in tracking for the remainder of the war as part of its activities. This change provided cover for the Selous Scouts' actual role but harmed the Army's tracking capabilities. From 1976 the Selous Scouts began to be used in raids on nearby countries, in part as the unit was much larger than the SAS.

The Selous Scouts sometimes attacked black Rhodesian civilians during their operations and gained a reputation for brutality. The unit was also accused of poaching. In early 1980 the Selous Scouts attacked churches as part of efforts to discredit black nationalist parties standing in the 1980 Southern Rhodesian general election. The Selous Scouts' illegal activities provided substantial short-term benefits for the Rhodesian government. However, over the longer term they became well known among civilians and undermined the rule of law and the government's legitimacy.

=== Combined Operations ===
Combined Operations was established in March 1977 as an attempt to better coordinate the Rhodesian war effort. The SAS and Selous Scouts reported directly to the head of Combined Operations, Lieutenant General Peter Walls. Headquarters, Special Forces was established on 1 July 1978 to control the special operations conducted under Combined Operations. The SAS was expanded to a full regiment in 1978 and the Selous Scouts achieved the same status the following year after also being increased in size. During 1978 and 1979 the CIO and SAS collaborated to establish the RENAMO guerrilla force in Mozambique.

The overlap in roles between the Selous Scouts and the SAS led to friction between the two units. They also competed for personnel, with the demands of the Selous Scouts leading to a decline in the effectiveness of the SAS as well as the Rhodesian Light Infantry and Rhodesian African Rifles. The Rhodesian leadership considered the SAS to be more professional and security conscious than the Selous Scouts.

During the final period of the Bush War, some elements of the Security Force Auxiliaries were assigned to the control of Headquarters, Special Forces. These were private armies raised by pro-government black political parties made up mainly of ill-trained recruits. They proved of little military value and may have been counter-productive as they were undisciplined and at times attacked civilians.

The SAS and Selous Scouts were disbanded in 1980 following the end of the Rhodesian Bush War and Rhodesia's transition to Zimbabwe.

== See also ==
- Special Forces of Zimbabwe
- South African Special Forces
