= Leopard security vehicle =

Leopard Security Vehicle
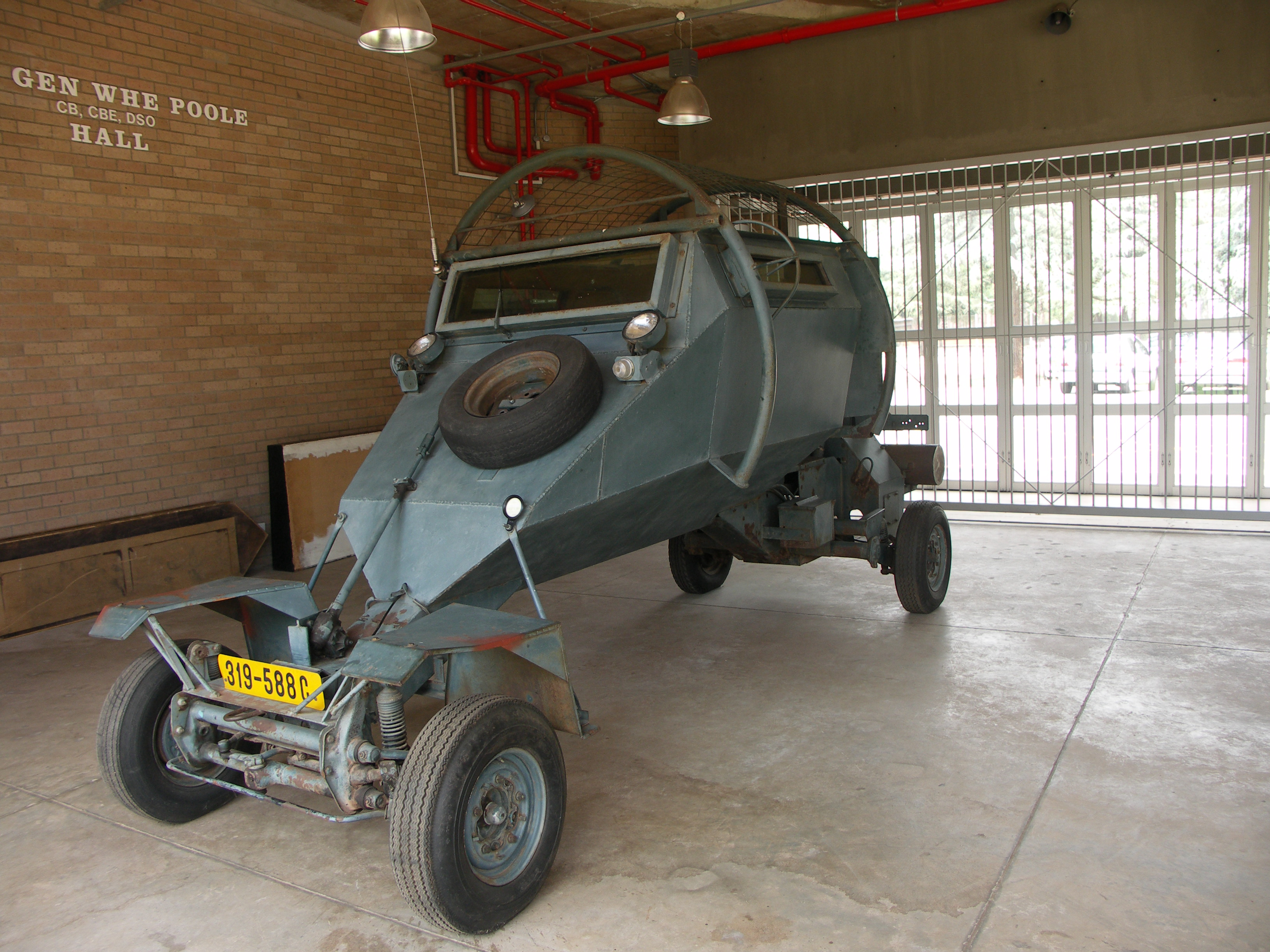
- Leopard Security Vehicle Mk6, No 594 of 700.
- Type: MPAV ("Mine Protected Armoured Vehicle")
- Place of origin: Rhodesia

Specifications
- Mass: Recorded as 2.2 tons (1980 kg), actual weight of dry vehicle without crew 1760 kg
- Crew: 1+5 (later 1+4 regardless of version)
- Armor: Early marks: mild steel plate with conveyor belting sandwiched in-between, later marks; (lower hull): 12 mm "Bennox" steel plate, (upper hull): mild-steel plate. (The armour was primarily intended as protection against land-mine blasts, and offered limited resistance to small arms fire).
- Main armament: Optional 7.62 mm LMG such as the FN MAG, various anti-ambush devices.
- Secondary armament: Crew weapons
- Engine: Air-cooled 4-cylinder petrol engine, VW Type 1, dual port. 1600cc
- Suspension: 2*4-wheel, rear-wheel drive, VW 'Type 2' (T2b) Kombi Transporter / Bus front and rear sub assemblies
- Operational range: Never recorded, but estimated at under 300 km, always considered inadequate due to limited size of fuel tank.
- Maximum speed: Max 80 km/h on tar road.

The Leopard Security Vehicle is a land-mine protected APC used by the Rhodesian government and civilian population during the 1964–1979 Rhodesian Bush War. It offered basic but necessary protection against mine attack through the use of a V-hull.

== Design ==
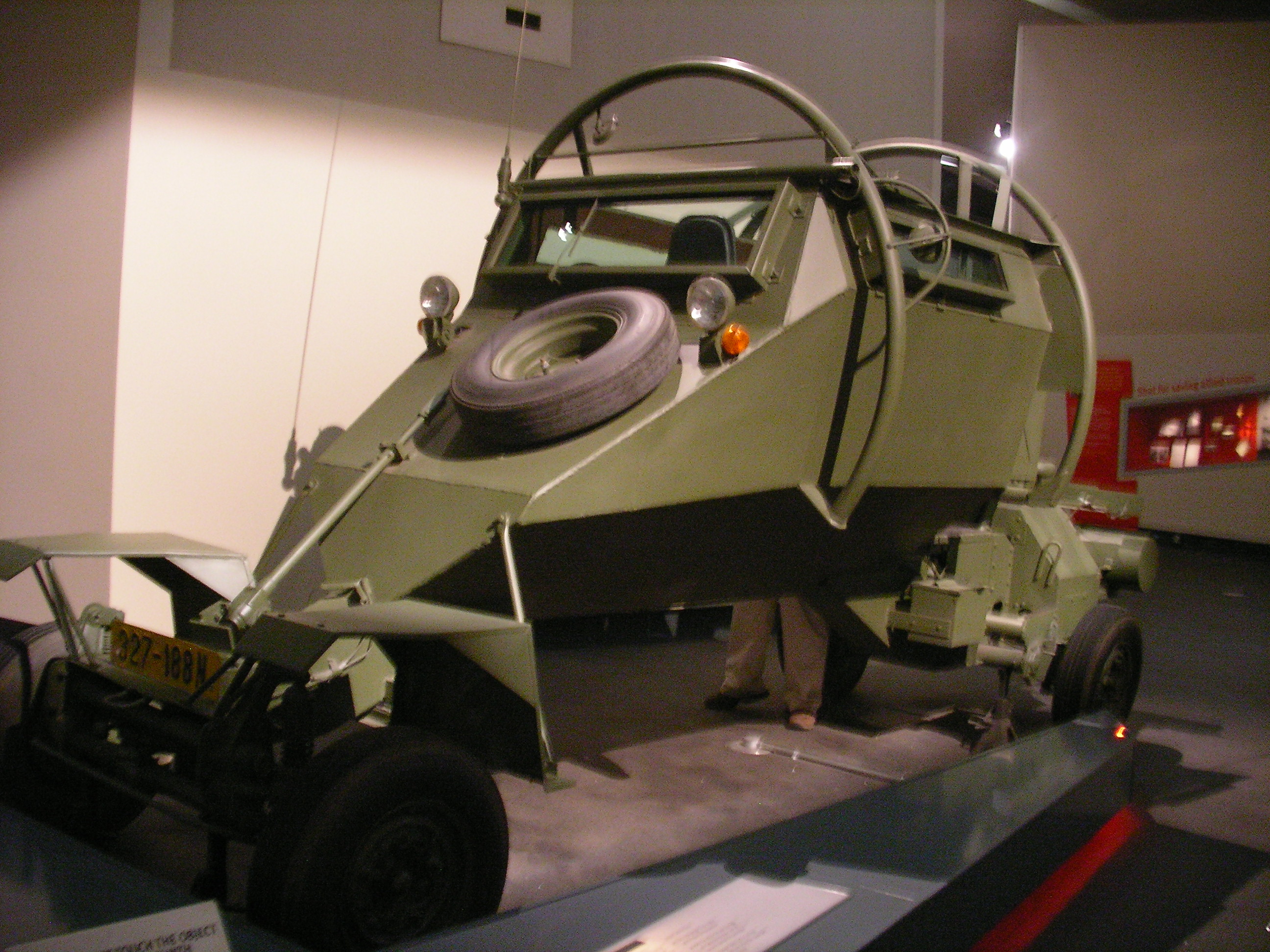
Leopard displayed in the Imperial War Museum North, Manchester, UK

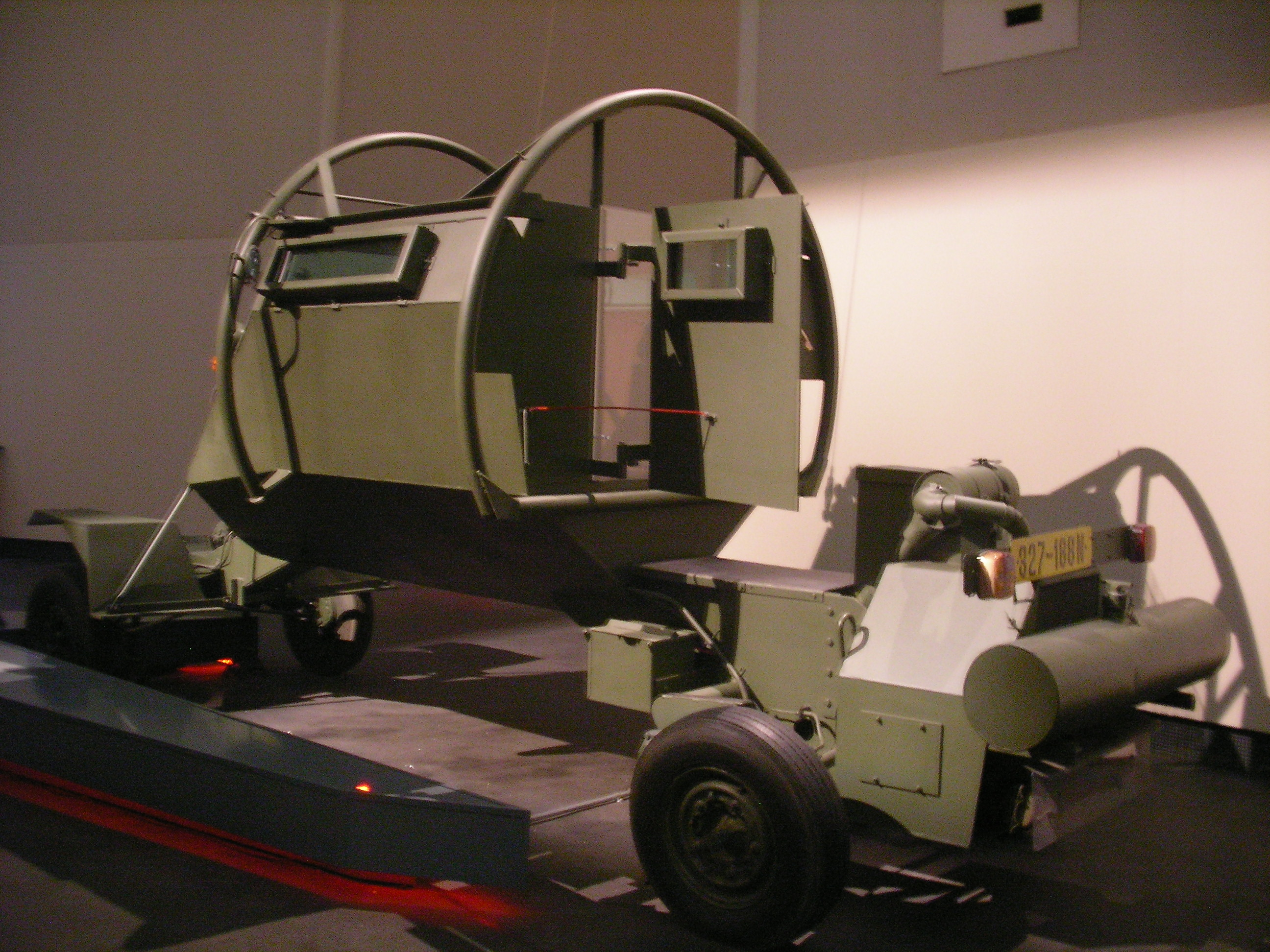
View from rear, showing passenger entrance door, steps up, engine compartment and fuel tank at extreme rear.

The Leopard was designed in 1974 by Ernest Konschel. It pre-dates and is similar in concept to the South African Buffel, but is smaller, and carried a driver on the front right, 2 passengers behind on the right, and three on the left. All passengers were on bench seats fixed to the hull facing in. It is powered by a Volkswagen Type 1 engine located in an un-armoured enclosure at the rear, behind the rear axle.

The vehicle is notable for its highly unusual shape, all facets of which are intended to counter the effect of land mine blasts.

- V-hull cab,
- circular external roll over bars,
- soft-top roof, preventing undue pressure build-up in the hull in the event of a land-mine blast.
- detachable front and rear suspension and engine sub-assemblies,
- all passenger seats are fitted with semi-adjustable over-shoulder and lap straps,
- road wheels deliberately positioned well away from the passenger compartment or hull, so that if a mine was triggered by a road wheel the hull was not directly over the blast field.

This vehicle is considered the first monocoque mine proof vehicle produced. The example shown, from the Imperial War Museum North in Manchester, UK, was built in 1978-9 according to the attached label, making this the Mk6 variant.

== Production history ==
The Leopard was produced in Rhodesia from 1975 to 1979 by Willowvale Motor Industries Ltd., and possibly in South-West Africa (Namibia), from a design by and under the supervision of Ernest Konschel. He was a Rhodesian engineer and farmer who also designed the Pookie mine detecting vehicle. Some 700–750 Leopards are recorded as being produced with only 3 complete examples surviving.

The Leopard was primarily intended for use as a vehicle to provide cost-effective protection to the civilian population, which was particularly susceptible to the devastating effects of land-mine warfare. Mine-proof vehicles were not readily available due to the severe economic sanctions imposed on Rhodesia at the time.

Modified versions, particularly those with a double door on the rear, were produced for the Rhodesian Security Forces, though this vehicle never found particular favour with these armed formations. The surviving vehicles on display are fundamentally designed and were sold for civilian use.

This vehicle predates the South African 'Buffel' by several years. Many Rhodesian-designed vehicles were shipped to South Africa for trial and 'reverse engineering', giving rise to the first generation of South African monocoque mine proof vehicles.

The Leopard suffered from a number of practical problems, which included overheating of the VW 1600cc, Dual port, Type 2, Air-cooled engine; a lack of power to traverse difficult terrain and escape ambush situations; and the unintended parting of the front or rear sub-assemblies from the hull while traversing difficult terrain. The Rhodesian Police, BSAP, particularly did not favour the vehicle and preferred various other mine resisting vehicles such as the Cougar (also designed by Konschel) and locally produced armored Land Rovers.

The pictures of the IWM Leopard show a lack of two essential pieces of protection equipment: a sturdy wire mesh curved to fit to the top of the roll bars which acted as an anti-grenade screen preventing these entering the hull and the canvas roof which stretched over the screen to further help as an anti-grenade measure and keep out rain. This vehicle has been repainted at some time in an incorrect colour.

== Operators ==
Primarily civilian, but utilized by many civilian and paramilitary branches of the Rhodesian government. The vehicle did not find favour with the Rhodesian Army.

Surviving examples were later passed on to the Zimbabwean security forces at independence.

== Combat history ==
- Rhodesia

== See also ==
- Infantry fighting vehicle
- List of armored fighting vehicles
- Mamba
- Buffel
