= Rhodesian Women's Service =

- Active: 1975–1980
- Country: Rhodesia
- Part of: Rhodesian Security Forces
- Engagements: Rhodesian Bush War

The Rhodesian Women's Service was an element of the Rhodesian Security Forces staffed predominantly by women from the state's small governing white minority. It was formed in 1975 and undertook support roles during the Rhodesian Bush War. The service was disbanded in 1980.

== History ==
The Rhodesian media and African nationalist propaganda presented women from the small white minority as being non-combatants in need of protection from men. In reality, white women were involved in the Rhodesian Bush War with some being involved in combat.

The Rhodesian Women's Service (RWS) was formed in 1975. It aimed to free up white men for frontline service in the Bush War. Women also served in the British South Africa Police. Men were subject to conscription but women served on a voluntary basis.

It was announced on 28 June 1975 that white women would be recruited to serve with the Rhodesian Army and Rhodesian Air Force. The first intake of 30 white women began training on 4 August that year. This was a pilot scheme, and after it proved successful an increase to 300 women was authorised by the government. As part of the RWS, women served in administrative, communications, military intelligence, bomb disposal, medical and veterinary roles. They were posted to all branches of the Rhodesian Security Forces. The women were not permitted to serve in combat roles. They were deployed to areas in which fighting was taking place, including to recover combat casualties, and were at times armed.

As of 1976 there were about 40 women serving with the Rhodesian Air Force, nick-named 'Blue Birds'. They undertook communications, photography intelligence and air control tasks and were able to volunteer for permanent roles in the force. Until 1 July 1977 the RWS was considered a temporary element of the Air Force. After that date women were became full regular air women and were awarded ranks. From August 1977 the Rhodesian Air Force began running its own initial training courses for women. The first coloured woman was also recruited into the Air Force at this time. Women eventually served in most roles in the Air Force.

Members of the RWS were paid much less than their male equivalents. In late 1976 or early 1977 pay rates were increased to 80 percent of male levels and the government agreed to establish a commandant of the RWS. A group of women began training to become officers in October 1977. They graduated on 30 November that year, and Lieutenant Barbara Trow was appointed the RWS Commandant. As part of efforts to racially integrate the Rhodesian Security Forces in 1979 the RWS directorate was disbanded.

Following Rhodesia's transition to majority rule as Zimbabwe the RWS was abolished in 1980. By this time, more than 700 women had served in it. In contrast, thousands of black women served with the African nationalist forces. Many black women fought as soldiers for the nationalist cause.

The Zimbabwe African People's Union nationalist group that was fighting for majority rule released propaganda mocking the involvement of white women in the security forces, claiming that the government had been forced to form a "mummies army".
