= Rhodesian Intelligence Corps =

- Active: 1975–1980
- Disbanded: 1980
- Country: Rhodesia
- Branch: Rhodesian Army
- Nickname: RIC

The Rhodesian Intelligence Corps was a military intelligence regiment within the Rhodesian Army concerned with training personnel, units, and organizations for specialist intelligence functions.

== History ==
On the 1st of July 1975, the Rhodesian Intelligence Corps was formed with the role of training personnel, units, and organizations for specialist intelligence functions. The Corps was almost completely staffed by reservist soldiers. Their field role was to collect intelligence and provided up-to-date maps for the Rhodesian Security Forces.

The official abbreviation of the Rhodesian Intelligence Corps was RIC.

== Uniform ==
The stable belt of the Rhodesian Intelligence Corps went vertically blue-yellow-blue-yellow-blue with a coat of arms of the buckle.

== See also ==
- Rhodesian Bush War
