= Pookie (vehicle) =

South African mine-resistant vehicle

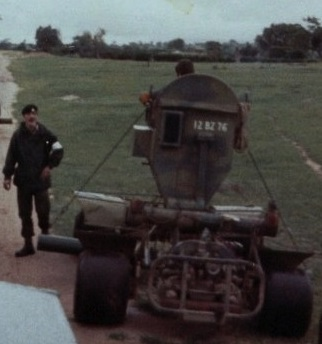
A Pookie deployed in 1979

The Pookie MRAP vehicle was created to deal with the constant mining of roadways during the Rhodesian Bush War.

== Description ==
The Pookie was a small one-person vehicle named after the bush baby, and fitted with large Formula One tires bought second hand after the South African Grand Prix. The wide tyres prevented the detonation of buried mines by exerting less ground pressure than a human footprint and spanning the mines' circumference. The vehicle was made with readily available parts from the Volkswagen Kombi and resembled a small go-cart with an elevated cab to protect the driver. The bottom of the cab had a V-shaped reinforced hull to deflect the blast away from the operator. Sensor 'pans', resembling rectangular wings, were lowered and used parallel to the ground below the cab. When the vehicle was transported, the pans were raised at a 45-degree angle.

According to Trevor Davies Engineering, manufacturer of the Pookie, "...of the 76 vehicles built between 1976 and 1980 none ever detonated a mine, though 12 were lost and two drivers were killed." Remotely detonated mines were responsible for the loss of the 12 vehicles and one of the fatalities, though it is not clear of the remaining fatality, caused by an RPG, also resulted in the loss of vehicle and if that loss was included in the previous count.

In 1999, an unknown number of new Pookies were manufactured by MineTech, a British company specialising in mine countermeasures. The MineTech Pookie was virtually identical to the Rhodesian Pookie, only fitted with a different engine and detailed improvements such as hydraulic steering. It was deployed to Afghanistan and Somalia by private de-mining contractors.

== Operators ==
- Rhodesia: Rhodesian Security Forces
- South Africa: South African Police
