= Grey's Scouts =

Rhodesian mounted infantry unit

- Insignia used by the Grey's Scouts.
- Active: July 1975 – 1986
- Country: Rhodesia (1975–79); Zimbabwe Rhodesia (1979); Zimbabwe (1980–1986)
- Branch: Rhodesian Army (1975–1980); Zimbabwe National Army (1980–1986)
- Type: Mounted Infantry
- Role: Tracking, Patrolling, Reconnaissance
- Size: 800 at peak
- Garrison/HQ: Salisbury, Rhodesia
- Nickname: The Grey's
- Engagements: Rhodesian Bush War

Grey's Scouts were a Rhodesian mounted infantry unit raised in July 1975 and named after George Grey, a British soldier and governor. Based in Salisbury (now Harare) it patrolled Rhodesia's borders during the Rhodesian Bush War, and then became a regiment of the Special Forces of Zimbabwe in June 1980. It was totally disbanded in July 1986 because of a lack of resources.

== Role and history ==
The creation of the unit was probably inspired by the Dragoons of Angola, a Portuguese Army mounted unit, raised in 1966, during the Portuguese Colonial War, to combat the guerrillas in Eastern Angola. A similar unit was being raised by the Portuguese in Rhodesia's neighboring Mozambique when the war ended in 1974.

The Grey's Scouts were established by the Rhodesian Army as the Mounted Infantry Unit in July 1975. The unit was re designated the Grey's Scouts the next year. Most members of the unit were white Rhodesians, as experience with horses was mainly limited to the privileged white minority of the population. However, it also included some black Rhodesians who had previously worked with horses and members of the Shangaan ethnic group who were expert trackers. Most of the black soldiers posted to the unit were assigned to care for its horses, with only a small number holding combat roles.

The unit's main role was to patrol Rhodesia's borders with Zambia and Mozambique to detect insurgents who were entering the country. Attempts to monitor the border using electronic means had failed, and the terrain in these areas was unsuitable for motor vehicles. In this role, the Grey's Scouts undertook tracking, reconnaissance and pursuit. It was often used to patrol the minefields along Rhodesia's borders. Horses were used for transport purposes only, with the members of the unit fighting on foot. The Grey's Scouts occasionally took part in attacks made by the Rhodesian Security Forces in neighbouring countries.

The Grey's Scouts operated at times with the Selous Scouts and Rhodesian Armoured Corps. The Selous Scouts attacked insurgents located by the Grey's Scouts, and the unit supported armoured cars. The Rhodesian Combined Operations Headquarters considered the Grey's Scouts to be one of the country's elite units, but it was not as well trained or effective as the Selous Scouts or Special Air Service.

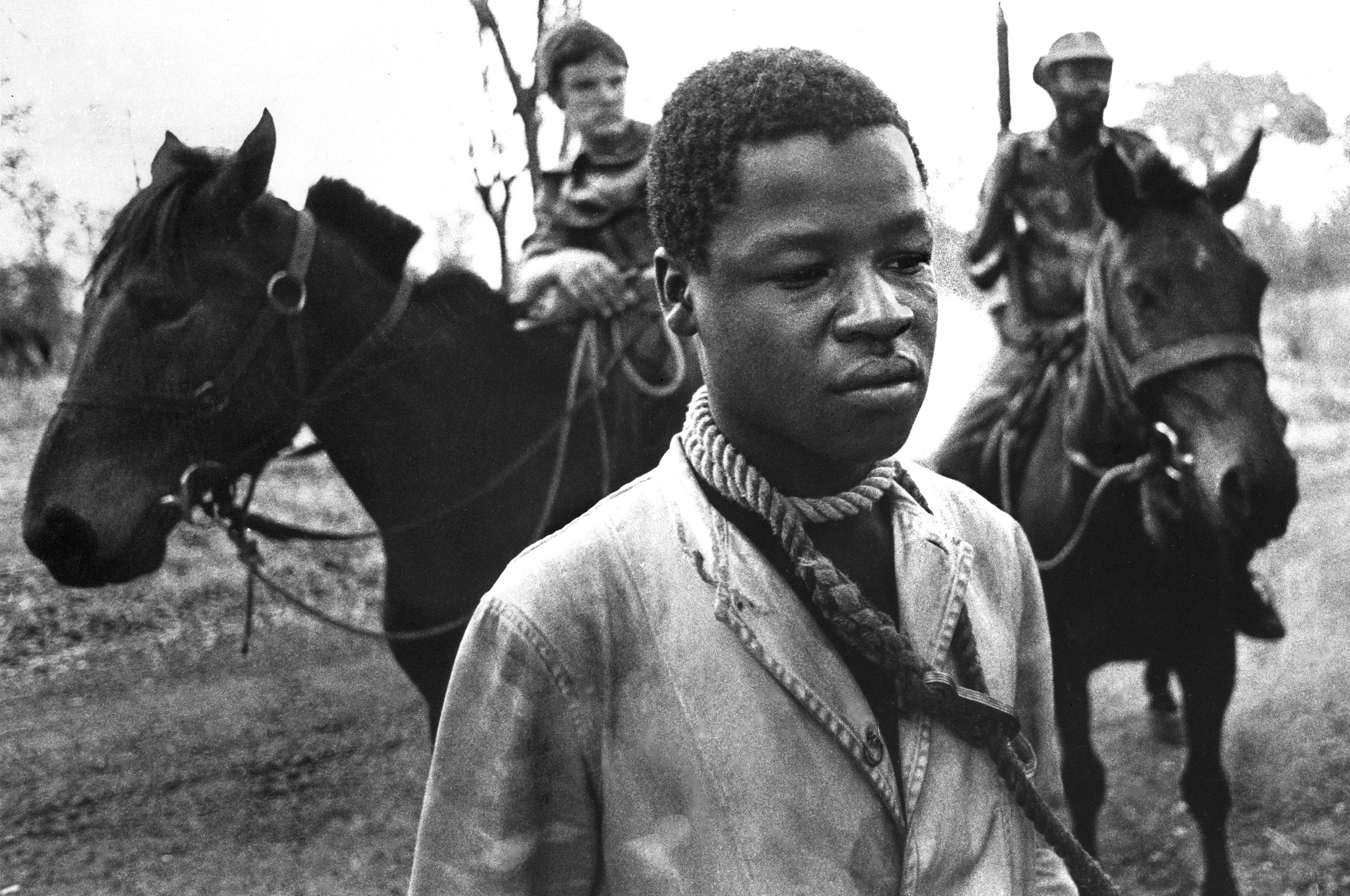
A photo taken by J. Ross Baughman depicting a member of the Grey's Scouts about to use a noose to drag a prisoner behind his horse

The historian Charles D. Melson has written that the Grey's Scouts "suffered a degree of notoriety during the war". A photo depicting a member of the Grey's Scouts about to use a noose to drag a prisoner behind his horse was among those that won J. Ross Baughman the 1978 Pulitzer Prize in Feature Photography. Baughman reported that during the period he spent with the unit its members also beat a civilian to death, tortured women, mistreated prisoners, looted civilian property and destroyed civilian huts. The Rhodesian Government claimed that most of these incidents had not occurred and Major Mike Williams, the second in command of the Grey's Scouts at the time, has alleged that Baughman encouraged violence and staged some of the photos. A regimental history of the unit rejected Williams' account, but suggested that some of the photos were staged or doctored. The former Grey's Scout Bruce Moore-King, who was part of the patrol Baughman joined, has stated that he often tortured children while serving in the unit to compel village leaders to provide intelligence on insurgents. Moore-King also claimed that members of the unit occasionally assaulted civilians.

Few members of the Grey's Scouts were killed during the Rhodesian Bush War.

Following the end of Rhodesian Bush War the Grey's Scout's were retained in the new Zimbabwean Army. Many of its white officers reportedly resigned to serve in the South African Defence Force. It was mainly used to patrol Zimbabwe's borders and prevent poaching. In 1984 the Grey's Scouts formed part of a force that was used to enforce a curfew in Matabeleland South. This curfew greatly worsened food shortages in the drought-affected area. As part of this operation the Grey's Scouts were involved in fighting with rebels.

== Structure ==
The unit eventually reached a strength of 800 men. These included regular soldiers, territorials and conscripts. It drew on soldiers from other infantry regiments of the Rhodesian Army, who were then instructed in equestrianism as well as men with no horse experience. Specialist craftsmen such as farriers, smiths and manufacturers also formed part of the unit, and allowed it to be largely self-sufficient.

The Grey's Scouts initially comprised a single squadron. By 1978 it was organised into three sabre squadrons, designated A, B, and C Squadrons, and a support squadron. Each of the sabre squadrons comprised three troops. The troops were made up of four eight-man sections with each section forming two four-man sticks. The support squadron included a reconnaissance troop, a tracking troop and a mortar section. The sabre squadrons had a total authorised strength of approximately 450 men and 400 horses. The unit came under the direct control of Combined Operations headquarters.

The horses used by the unit were mainly small cross breeds sourced from South Africa. Pack horses carried loads of up to 140 kilograms (310 lb). The Grey's Scouts also had motor transport, including both non-armoured and mine-protected vehicles. These vehicles were used to rapidly redeploy elements of the unit, including horses.
