= Rhodesian Defence Regiment =

- Active: 1978–1980
- Country: Rhodesia
- Branch: Regular Army
- Type: Infantry
- Role: Static guard unit
- Size: 2 Battalions
- Engagements: Rhodesian Bush War

The Rhodesian Defence Regiment (RDR) was a unit of the Rhodesian Army during the last years of the Rhodesian Bush War from 1978 to 1980. It was a guard unit composed of mainly coloured and Asian conscripts.

== History ==
It was formed on 1 January 1978 from existing units known as Reserve Holding Units and Protection Units. The Reserve Holding Units (for support roles) and Protection Units (for escorting supplies in combat zones) contained Rhodesia's coloured (i.e. mixed race) and Asian personnel, including both conscripts and volunteers.

The regiment consisted of seven companies, organized into the 1 Mashonaland Battalion at Cranborne Barracks in Salisbury and 2 Matebeleland Battalion at Brady Barracks in Bulawayo. The regimental training depot was located at Inkomo, near Salisbury.

One RDR battalion was attached to each brigade headquarters to guard military installations and lines of communication. It was also tasked with railway patrolling, convoy protection, and regular infantry duties. From its formation, the regiment was also used to mobilise white reservists over the age of 38, although it was mostly coloured and Asian. The drafts of white reservists and conscripts were usually low quality and were barely trained, and suffered from poor morale due to being attached to notoriously inefficient units. Due to its poor discipline, the RDR was disparagingly nicknamed the "Rhodesian Dagga Regiment", after the slang term for marijuana. Paul Moorcraft and Pete McLaughlin have written that the RDF units "would have had little chance" if they were ever attacked by a determined enemy force.

The RDR was disbanded shortly after the 1980 Southern Rhodesian general election.

== Engagements ==
An example of the Regiment's role in defence of Rhodesia's strategic installations during the Bush War was witnessed in the events of 15 November 1978, at Otto Beit Bridge (on the Zambezi River) where the RDR was the most forward army unit during a major bomb, mortar, rocket and machine-gun attack on Rhodesian army positions at the Chirundu border. In this engagement the RDR contributed, as first line of defence, to the 'neutralisation' of the enemy positions.
