= Rhodesian Security Forces =

Military forces of the state of Rhodesia (1964–80)

- Founded: 1964
- Disbanded: 1980
- Service branches: Rhodesian Army; Rhodesian Air Force; British South Africa Police; Ministry of Internal Affairs Guard Force
- Headquarters: Salisbury

Leadership
- Commander-in-Chief: See list
- Minister of Defence: See list
- Head of the Rhodesian Armed Forces: See list

Related articles
- History: Rhodesian Bush War
- Ranks: Military ranks

The Rhodesian Security Forces were the military of Rhodesia. The Rhodesian Security Forces consisted of the Rhodesian Army (see below), the Rhodesian Air Force, the British South Africa Police, and various personnel affiliated to the Rhodesian Ministry of Internal Affairs. Despite the impact of economic and diplomatic sanctions, Rhodesia was able to develop and maintain a potent and professional military capability.

The Rhodesian Security Forces of 1964–80 traced their history back to the British South Africa Company armed forces, originally created during company rule in the 1890s. These became the armed forces of the British self-governing colony of Southern Rhodesia on its formation in 1923, then part of the Federation of Rhodesia and Nyasaland military in 1953. After the break-up of the Federation at the end of 1963, the security forces assumed the form they would keep until 1980.

As the armed forces of Rhodesia (as Southern Rhodesia called itself from 1964), the Rhodesian Security Forces remained loyal to the Salisbury government after it unilaterally declared independence from Britain on 11 November 1965. Britain and the United Nations refused to recognise this declaration, and regarded the breakaway state as a rebellious British colony throughout its existence.

The security forces fought on behalf of the government against the Zimbabwe African National Liberation Army and the Zimbabwe People's Revolutionary Army—the military wings of the Marxist–Leninist black nationalist Zimbabwe African National Union and Zimbabwe African People's Union respectively—during the Rhodesian Bush War of the 1960s and 1970s.

The Lancaster House Agreement and the return of Rhodesia to de facto British control on 12 December 1979 changed the Security Forces' role altogether; during the five-month interim period, they helped the British governor and Commonwealth Monitoring Force to keep order in Rhodesia while the 1980 general election was organised and held. After the internationally recognised independence of Zimbabwe in April 1980, the Rhodesian Security Forces, the Zimbabwe African National Liberation Army and the Zimbabwe People's Revolutionary Army were integrated to form the new Zimbabwe Defence Forces. Around 5,000 Rhodesian military and intelligence personnel were recruited by South Africa in 1980 as part of Operation Winter.

== Rhodesian Army ==
Rhodesian Army
- Flag of the Rhodesian Army, used during the late 1970s.
- Active: 1927–1980
- Disbanded: 18 April 1980
- Country: Rhodesia
- Allegiance: United Kingdom (1927–1965); Rhodesia (1965–70); Rhodesia (1970–79); Zimbabwe Rhodesia (1979); United Kingdom (1979–80)
- Branch: Ground forces
- Garrison/HQ: Salisbury
- Colours: Rifle green
- Engagements: World War I World War II; Rhodesian Bush War

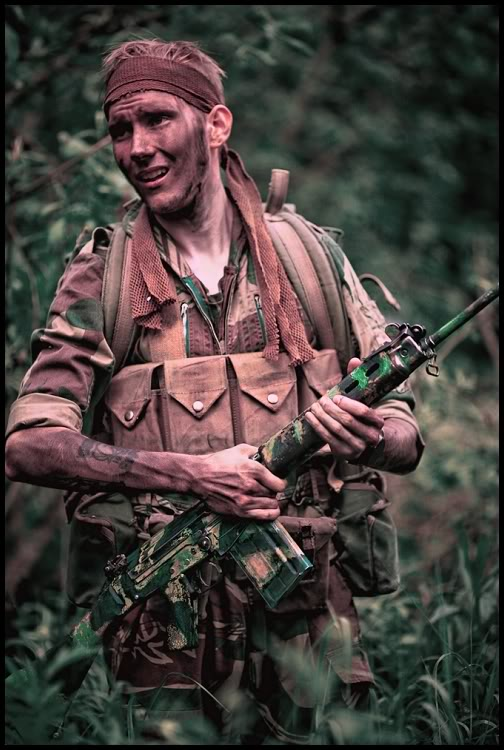
A Finnish reenactor portraying a Rhodesian trooper. The primary infantry weapon of the Rhodesian Army was the FN FAL battle rifle.

The majority of the Southern Rhodesia Volunteers were disbanded in 1920 for reasons of cost, the last companies being disbanded in 1926. The Defence Act of 1927 created a Permanent Force (the Rhodesian Staff Corps) and a Territorial Force as well as national compulsory military training. With the Southern Rhodesia Volunteers disbanded in 1927, the Rhodesia Regiment was reformed in the same year as part of the nation's Territorial Force. The 1st Battalion was formed in Salisbury with a detached "B" company in Umtali and the 2nd Battalion in Bulawayo with a detached "B" Company in Gwelo. Between the World Wars, the Permanent Staff Corps of the Rhodesian Army consisted of only 47 men. The British South Africa Police were trained as both policemen and soldiers until 1954.

About 10,000 white Southern Rhodesians (15% of the white population) mustered into the British forces during the Second World War, serving in units such as the Long Range Desert Group, the Rhodesian Armoured Corps, No. 237 Squadron RAF and the Special Air Service (SAS). Pro rata to population, this was the largest contribution of manpower by any territory in the British Empire, even outstripping that of Britain itself. Southern Rhodesia was in fact the first Commonwealth country to officially declare war on the Axis powers.

Southern Rhodesia's own units, most prominently the Rhodesian African Rifles (made up of black rank-and-filers and warrant officers, led by white officers; abbreviated RAR), fought in the war's East African Campaign and in Burma. During the war, Southern Rhodesian pilots proportionally earned the highest number of decorations and ace appellations in the Empire. This resulted in the Royal Family paying an unusual state visit to the colony at the end of the war in thanks to the efforts of the Rhodesian people.

The Southern Rhodesia Air Force (SRAF) was re-established in 1947 and, two years later, Prime Minister Sir Godfrey Huggins appointed a 32-year-old South African-born Rhodesian Spitfire pilot, Ted Jacklin, as air officer commanding tasked to build an air force in the expectation that British African territories would begin moving towards independence, and air power would be vital for land-locked Southern Rhodesia. The threadbare SRAF bought, borrowed or salvaged a collection of vintage aircraft, including six Tiger Moths, six North American Harvard trainers, an Avro Anson freighter and a handful of De Havilland Rapide transport aircraft, before purchasing a squadron of 22 Mk. 22 war surplus Supermarine Spitfire from the Royal Air Force (RAF) which were then flown to Southern Rhodesia.

In April 1951, the defence forces of Southern Rhodesia were completely reorganised. The Permanent Force included the British South Africa Police as well as the Southern Rhodesia Staff Corps, charged with training and administering the Territorial Force. The SRAF consisted of a communication squadron and trained members of the Territorial Force as pilots, particularly for artillery observation. During the Malayan Emergency of the 1950s, Southern Rhodesia contributed two units to the Commonwealth's counter-insurgency campaign: the newly formed Rhodesian SAS served a two-year tour of duty in Malaya starting in March 1951, then the Rhodesian African Rifles operated for two years from April 1956.

The colony also maintained women's auxiliary services (later to provide the inspiration for the Rhodesian Women's Service), and maintained a battalion of the RAR, officered by members of the Staff Corps. The Territorial Force remained entirely white and largely reproduced the Second World War pattern. It consisted of two battalions of the Royal Rhodesia Regiment, an Armoured Car Regiment, Artillery, Engineers, Signal Corps, Medical Corps, Auxiliary Air Force and Transport Corps. In wartime the country could also draw on the Territorial Force Reserve and General Reserve. Southern Rhodesia, in other words, reverted more or less to the organisation of the Second World War.

Matters evolved greatly over twenty years. The regular army was always a relatively small force, but by 1978–79 it consisted of 10,800 regulars nominally supported by about 40,000 reservists. While the regular army consisted of a professional core drawn from the white population (and some units, such as the Rhodesian SAS and the Rhodesian Light Infantry, were all-white), by 1978–79 the majority of its complement was actually composed of black soldiers. The army reserves, in contrast, were largely white.

The Rhodesian Army HQ was in Salisbury and commanded over four infantry brigades and later an HQ Special Forces, with various training schools and supporting units. Numbers 1,2, and 3 Brigade were established in 1964 and 4 Brigade in 1978.

- 1 Bde – Bulawayo with area of responsibility in Matabeleland
- 2 Bde – Salisbury with area of responsibility in Mashonaland
- 3 Bde – Umtali with area of responsibility in Manicaland
- 4 Bde – Fort Victoria with area of responsibility in Victoria province

During the Bush War, the army included:

- Army Headquarters
- The Rhodesian Light Infantry
- C Squadron (Rhodesian) SAS (in 1978 became 1 (Rhodesian) Special Air Service Regiment)
- Selous Scouts
- The Rhodesian Armoured Car Regiment (The Black Devils)
- Grey's Scouts
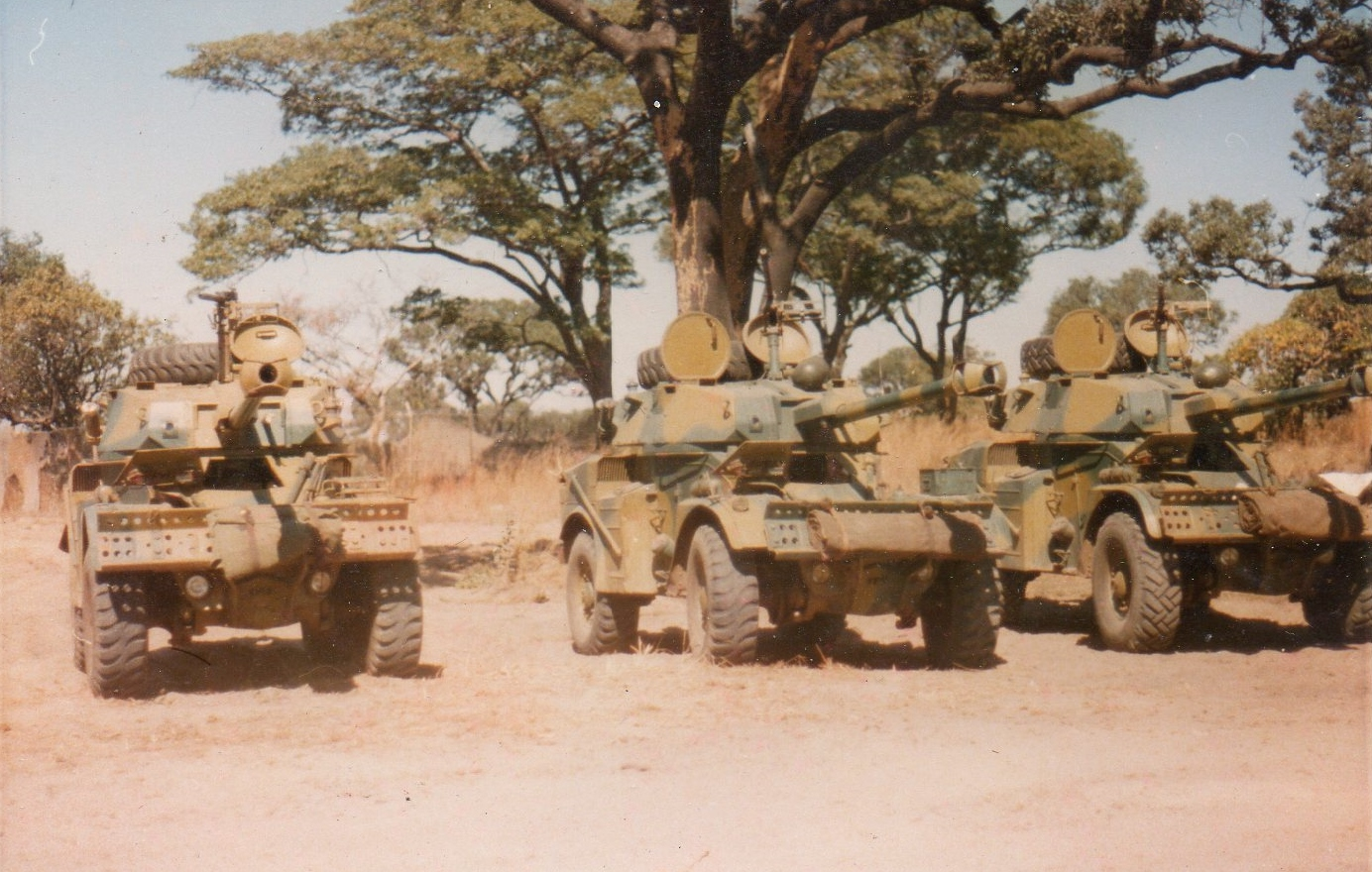
  Eland-90 armoured cars of the Rhodesian Armoured Corps.
- The Rhodesian African Rifles
- The Rhodesia Regiment (eight battalions, numbered 1, 2, 4, 5, 6, 8, 9, 10); also National Service independent companies numbered 1–6 and, briefly, 7), though at times one or more of these independent companies were attached to the RAR during the Bush War.
- 1 Psychological Operations Unit (Psyac)
- The Rhodesian Defence Regiment (two battalions)
- The Rhodesian Intelligence Corps
- The Rhodesian Artillery (one depot, one field regiment)
- Six Engineer Squadrons (numbered 2, 3, 4, 6, 7) 1 Engr Sqn
- 5 Engineer Support Squadron
- 1 Brigade
  - Headquarters Abbreviation: HQ 1 Bde
  - Signals Squadron Abbreviation: 1(Bde) Sig Sqn
- 2 Brigade
  - Headquarters Abbreviation: HQ 2 Bde
  - Signals Squadron Abbreviation: 2(Bde) Sig Sqn
    - 12 Signals Squadron Abbreviation: 2(Bde) 12 Sig Sqn
      - Located: Llewellyn Barracks
- 3 Brigade
  - Headquarters Abbreviation: HQ 3 Bde
  - Signals Squadron Abbreviation: 3(Bde) Sig Sqn
- 4 Brigade
  - Headquarters Abbreviation: HQ 4 Bde
  - 41 Troop, Signals Squadron Abbreviation: 41 Tp 4(Bde) SigSqn
- Two Services Area HQs (Matabeleland and Mashonaland)
- Two Ordnance and Supplies Depots (Bulawayo, Salisbury)
- Two Base Workshops (Bulawayo, Salisbury)
- 1 Air Supply Platoon
- Three Maintenance Companies (numbered 1 to 3)
- Three Medical Companies (1, 2, 5) and the Army Health Unit
- Tsanga Lodge
- Five Provost Platoons (numbered 1 to 5) and the Army Detention Barracks
- Six Pay Companies (numbered 1 to 5, 7)
- Rhodesian Army Education Corps
- Rhodesian Corps of Chaplains
- Army Records, and Army Data Processing Unit
- Rail Transport Organisation Platoon
- 1 Military Postal Platoon
- Training establishments: School of Infantry, 19 Corps Training Depot, School of Military Engineering, School of Signals, Services Training School, Services Trade Training Centre, Medical Training School, School of Military Police, Pay Corps Training School, School of Military Administration.
- Rhodesian Women's Service

=== Ranks ===
Rank group	General / flag officers			Senior officers			Junior officers
Rhodesian Army
Rhodesian Army	Lieutenant general	Major general	Brigadier	Colonel	Lieutenant colonel	Major	Captain	Lieutenant	Second lieutenant

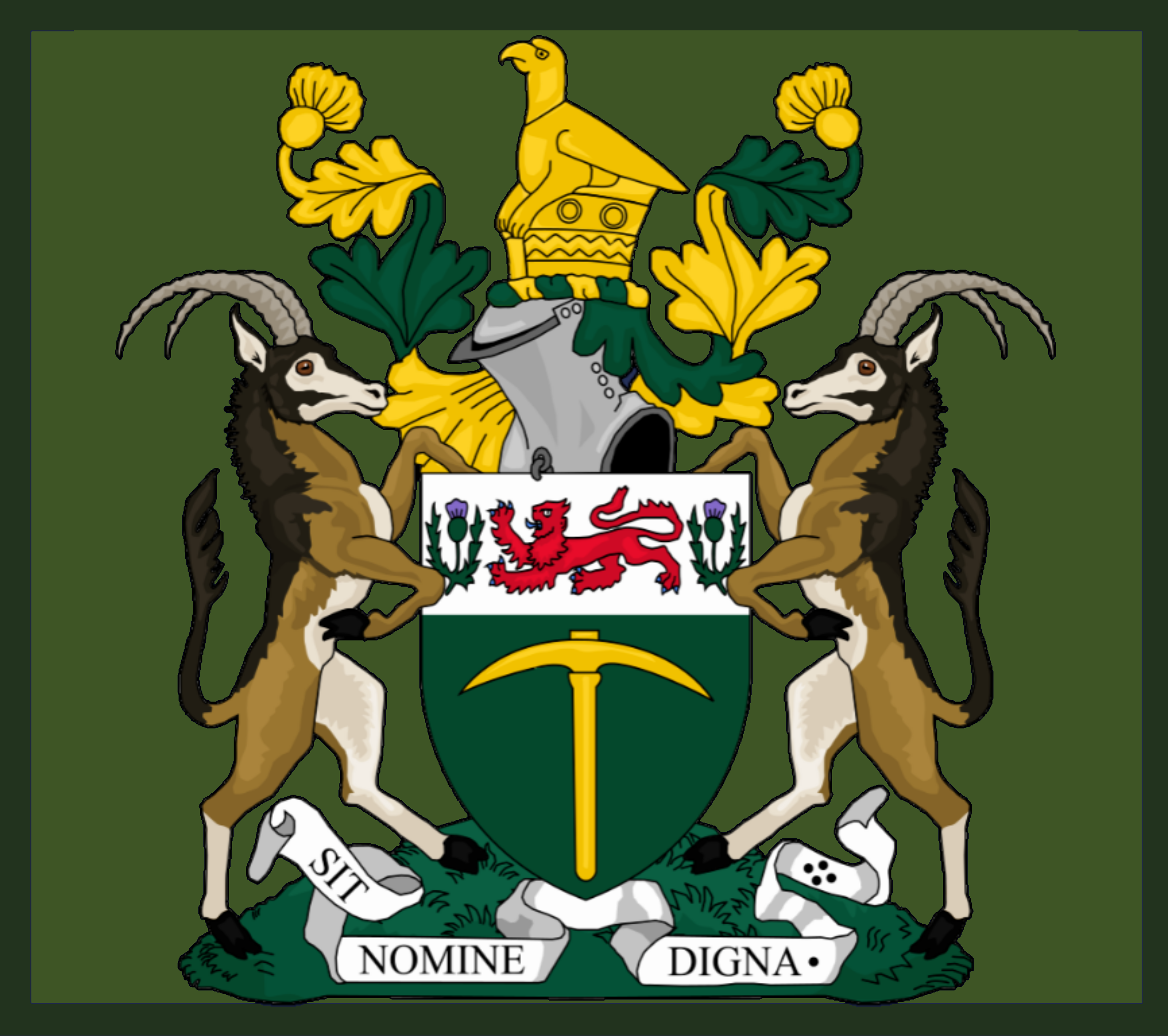
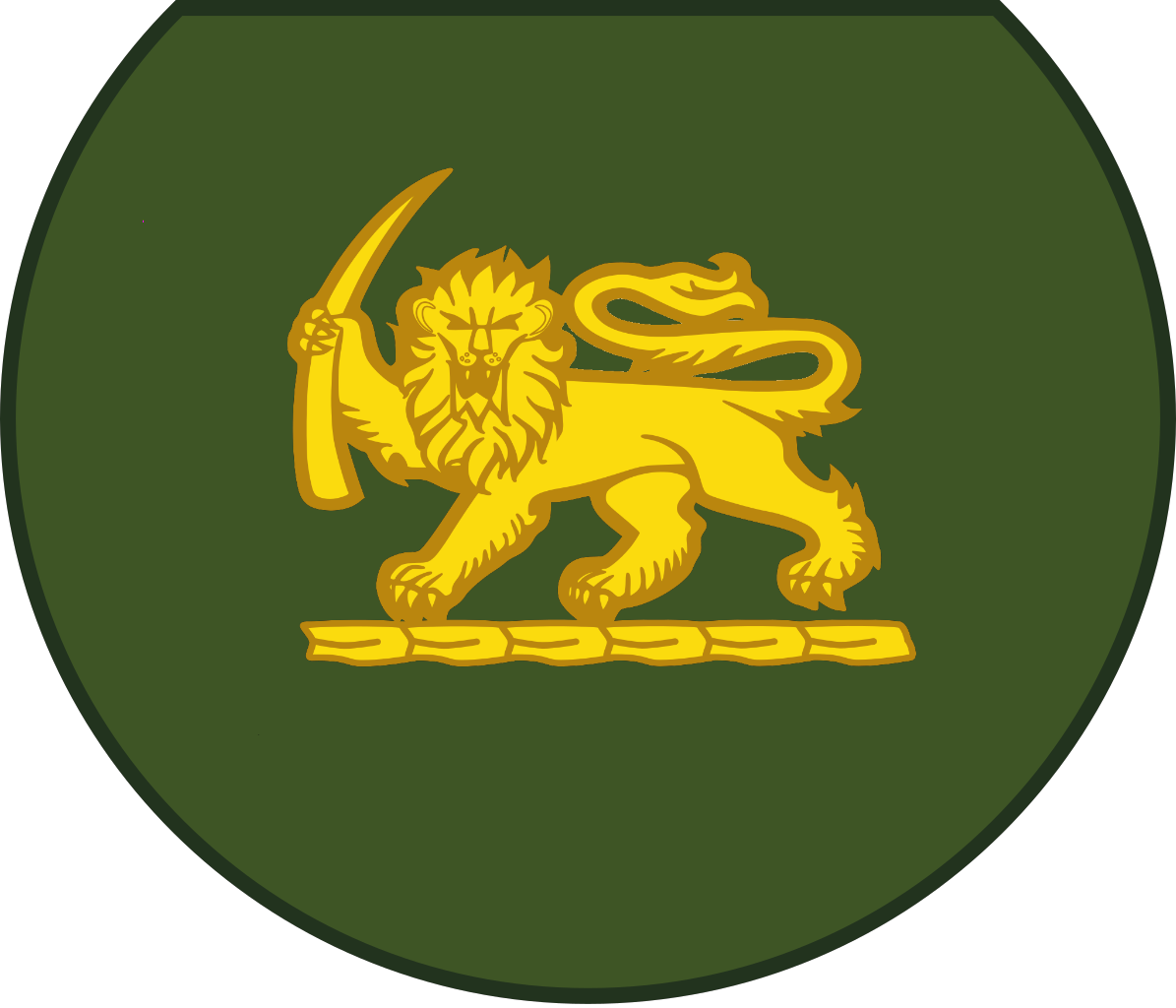
Rank group	Senior NCOs				Junior NCOs		Enlisted
Rhodesian Army							No insignia
Rhodesian Army	Warrant officer class 1	Warrant officer class 2	Staff sergeant	Sergeant	Corporal	Lance corporal	Private (or equivalent)

== Rhodesian Air Force ==
The Royal Rhodesian Air Force (RRAF), as it was named in 1954, was never a large service. In 1965, it consisted of only 1,200 regular personnel. It was renamed as the Rhodesian Air Force (RhAF) in 1970. At the peak of its strength during the Bush War, it had a maximum of 2,300 personnel of all races, but of these, only 150 were pilots actively involved in combat operations. These pilots, however, were rotated through the various squadrons partly to maintain their skills on all aircraft and partly to relieve fellow pilots flying more dangerous sorties.

=== Ranks ===
Rank group	General/Flag/Air officers			Senior officers			Junior officers
Rhodesian Air Force
Rhodesian Air Force	Air marshal	Air vice-marshal	Air commodore	Group captain	Wing commander	Squadron leader	Flight lieutenant	Air lieutenant	Air sub-lieutenant

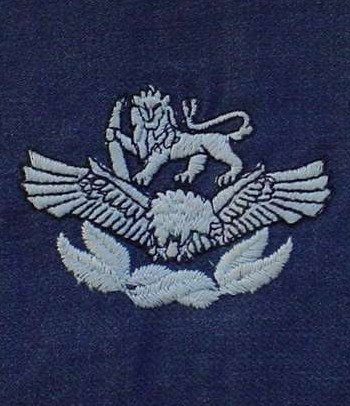
Rank group	Senior NCOs					Junior NCOs	Enlisted
Rhodesian Air Force			Warrant officer class 2 / Master Technician / Master Sergeant						No insignia
Rhodesian Air Force	Station warrant officer	Warrant officer class 1	Warrant officer class 2 / Master Technician / Master Sergeant	Flight sergeant	Sergeant	Corporal	Senior aircraftman	Leading aircraftman	Aircraftman

== British South Africa Police ==
The police force of Rhodesia was the British South Africa Police. They were the main first line of defense in both Southern Rhodesia and, later, Rhodesia, with the specific responsibility of maintaining law and order in the country.

BSAP units:

- British South Africa Police ('The Regiment')
  - Patrol
  - Criminal Investigation Division (CID)
  - Police Anti-Terrorist Unit (PATU)
  - Support Unit (the 'Black Boots')
  - Special Branch
    - SB-Scouts
  - Police Mounted Unit
  - Urban Emergency Unit (Riot & SWAT)
  - Police Reserve

== Rhodesian Ministry of Internal Affairs ==
While not a part of the Security Forces, Rhodesian Ministry of Internal Affairs officers were heavily involved in implementing such civic measures as the protected villages programme during the Bush War. The INTAF consisted by District Assistants and District Security Assistants, and led by District Commissioners.

- Administrative Reinforcement Unit (ARU)

== Prison services ==
The Rhodesia Prison Service was the branch of the Rhodesian Security Forces responsible for the administration of Rhodesian prisons.

== Guard Force ==
This was the fourth arm of the Rhodesian Security Forces. It consisted of both black and white troops whose initial role was to provide protection for villagers in the Protected Village system. During the latter stages of the Bush War they provided a role in the protection of white-owned farmland, tribal purchase lands and other strategic locations. They also raised three infantry Battalions and provided troops in every facet of the war in each of the Operational Areas. It was a large component of the Security Forces, with a strength of over 7,200 personnel. Its headquarters were in North Avenue, Salisbury. Its training establishment was based at Chikurubi in Salisbury.

The guard force cap badge was a castle on top of a dagger, below the castle was a scroll reading 'Guard Force'

== Combined operations ==
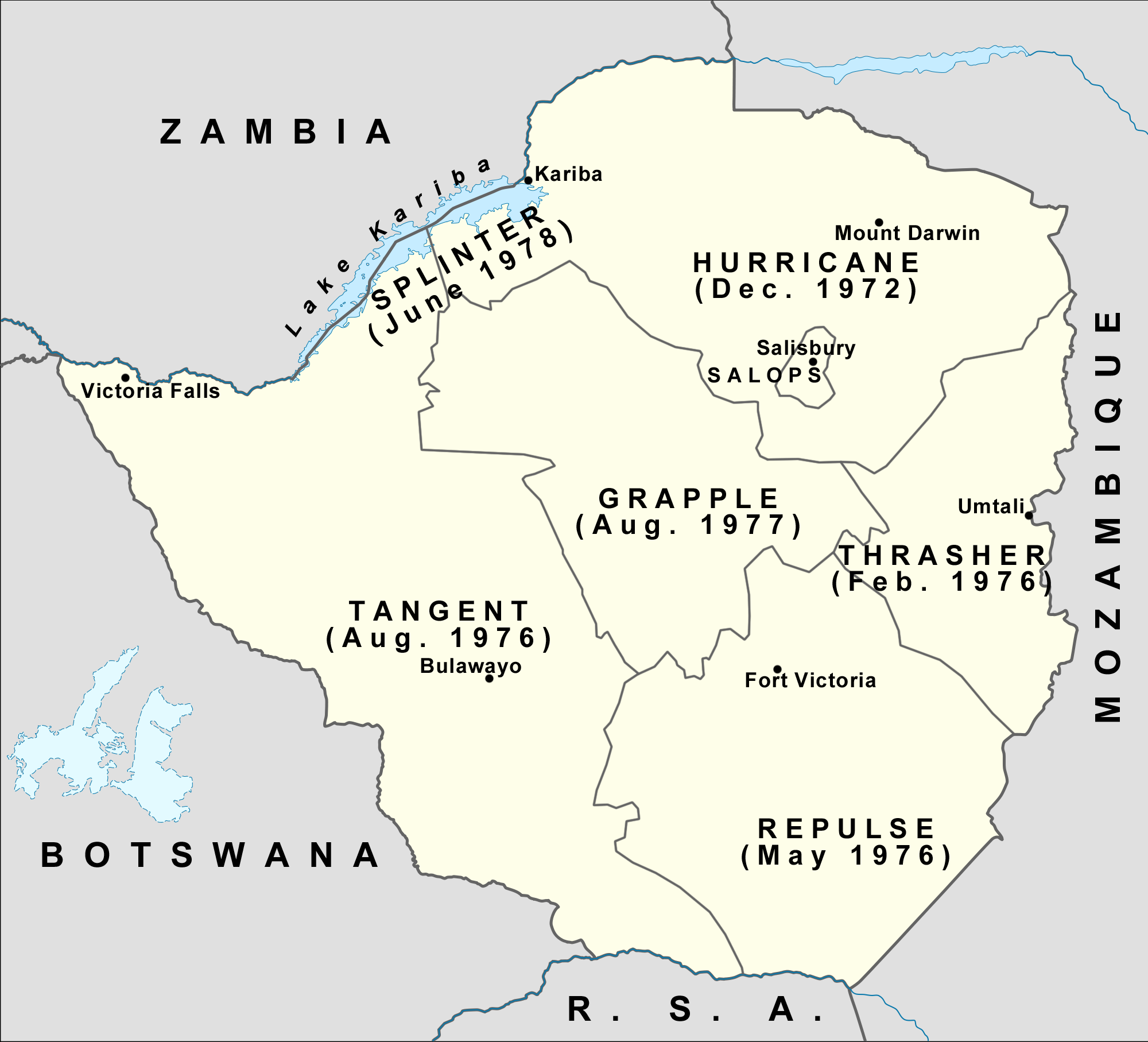
Map showing operational areas of the Rhodesian Security Forces during the Bush War.

The Rhodesian Bush War required that each of the security forces work in a combined effort to combat the enemy. Therefore, it became essential to establish an organisation known as Combined Operations (COMOPS) in Salisbury to co-ordinate the efforts of each service. The Rhodesian army took the senior role in Combined Operations and was responsible for the conduct of all operations both inside and outside Rhodesia. COMOPS had direct command over the Joint Operational Centres (JOCs) deployed throughout the country in each of the Operational Areas. There was a JOC per Operational Area.

The operational areas were known as:

- Operation Hurricane – North-east border, started in December 1972
- Operation Thrasher – Eastern border, started in February 1976
- Operation Repulse – South-east border, started in May 1976
- Operation Tangent – Matabeleland, started in August 1976
- Operation Grapple – Midlands, started in August 1977
- Operation Splinter – Kariba, started in June 1977
- Salops – Operations in and around Salisbury, started in 1978

== Senior military officials in Rhodesia ==
Source: original regiments.org (T.F. Mills) via webarchive.

- Commandant, Southern Rhodesia Defence Force:
  - 19uu Col. George Parson, CBE, DSO
  - 1936.10.09 Brig. John Sidney Morris, CBE, KStJ, KPM, CPM
- Commander Military Forces
  - Col D. S. H. Somerville (1939–40)
  - Brig J. W. Watson (1940–43)
  - Brig E. R. Day (1943-)
  - 1947 Maj-Gen Storr "Dooley" Garlake, CBE
- Chief of the General Staff:
  - 1953 Maj-Gen Storr "Dooley" Garlake, CBE
  - 1959.04.12 Maj-Gen Robert Edward Beaumont Long, CBE
  - 1963.06 Maj-Gen John Anderson, CBE
  - 1964.10.24 Maj-Gen Rodney Roy Jensen Putterill, CBE
- GOC Rhodesian Army:
  - 1968.10 Lt-Gen Keith Robert Coster, OBE, ICD, SASS
- Commander of the Rhodesian Army:
  - 1972.08 Lt-Gen George Peter Walls GLM DCD MBE
  - 1977.05.16 Lt-Gen John Selwyn Varcoe Hickman, OLM, MC
  - 1979.03.08 Lt-Gen A.L.C. 'Sandy' Maclean, OLM, DCD

== Military equipment of Rhodesia ==
=== Small arms ===
Name	Type	Country of origin	Notes
Browning Hi-Power	Semi-Automatic Pistol	Belgium	
Enfield revolver	Revolver	United Kingdom	Enfield No. 2 Mk I Revolver.
Mamba	Semi-Automatic Pistol	Rhodesia	
Star	Semi-Automatic Pistol	Spain	Model 1920, 1921, 1922, Star Model BM.
Walther PP	Semi-Automatic Pistol	West Germany	Captured.
American 180	Submachine gun	United States	Issued to SAS
Austen	Submachine gun	Australia	Austen "Machine Carbine" Mk I.
Sanna 77	Submachine gun	Rhodesia	Issued primarily to Rhodesian Ministry of Internal Affairs.
Northwood R-76	Submachine gun	Rhodesia	
Owen Gun	Submachine gun	Australia	
Sa 25 (vz. 48b)	Submachine gun	Czechoslovakia	Some of local manufacture.
Sten	Submachine gun	United Kingdom	Mk II.
Sterling	Submachine gun	United Kingdom	
Uzi	Submachine gun	Israel	Some of local manufacture.
AK-47	Automatic Rifle	Soviet Union	Captured.
AKM	Automatic Rifle	Soviet Union	Captured and used by Rhodesian Armoured Corps.
FN FAL	Battle Rifle	Belgium	Belgian FNs, South African R1s, Israeli FALOs.
Heckler & Koch G3	Battle Rifle	West Germany	G3A3, received from Portugal.
L1A1	Battle Rifle	United Kingdom	Issued primarily to reservists.
Lee–Enfield	Bolt-action rifle	United Kingdom	Some converted into sniper rifles.
M16A1	Automatic rifle	United States	Used very late in the war.
Mini-14	Semi-Automatic rifle	United States	Smuggled from U.S.
SKS	Semi-automatic rifle	Soviet Union	Captured.
Bren	Light machine gun	United Kingdom	Mk 3.
Browning M2	Heavy machine gun	United States	
Browning M1919	Medium machine gun	United States	Helicopter-mounted weapon.
Degtyaryov 1938/46	Light machine gun	Soviet Union	Captured.
FN MAG	General purpose machine gun	Belgium	MAG-58.
KPV	Heavy machine gun	Soviet Union	Captured.
PKM	General purpose machine gun	Soviet Union	Captured.
RPD	Light machine gun	Soviet Union	Captured.
RPK	Light machine gun	Soviet Union	Captured.
Browning Auto-5	Shotgun	United States	
Ithaca 37	Shotgun	United States	
Dragunov	Sniper rifle	Soviet Union	Captured.
Armscor M963	Fragmentation grenade	South Africa	Sourced via South Africa, Derived from INDEP's licence-made M26 grenade
STRIM 32Z	Anti-tank rifle grenade	France	Sourced via South Africa?
STRIM 28R	Rifle grenade	France	Sourced via South Africa?
PRB 424	Rifle grenade	Belgium	
Armscor 42 Zulu	Rifle grenade	South Africa	Sourced via South Africa, Derived from PRB 424
Mecar ENERGA	Anti-tank Rifle grenade	Belgium	Latterly sourced via South Africa
M18 Claymore	Anti-personnel mine	United States	
Mine G.S. Mk V	Anti-tank mine	United Kingdom	
Bazooka	Anti-tank weapon	United States	M20 Super Bazooka.
M72 LAW	Anti-tank weapon	United States	
RPG-2	Anti-tank weapon	Soviet Union	Captured.
RPG-7	Anti-tank weapon	Soviet Union	Captured.

=== Missiles and Recoilless Rifles ===
Name	Type	Country of Origin	Notes
M40	Anti-tank weapon	United States	Limited numbers loaned by South Africa late in the war. Mounted on Rodef 25 GS and mineproofed vehicles and operated by Rhodesian Light Infantry
B-11	Anti-tank weapon	Soviet Union	Captured late in the war.

=== Vehicles ===
Name	Type	Country of Origin	In Service	Notes
Scout & reconnaissance cars
BRDM-2	Scout Car	Soviet Union		Captured.
Eland	Reconnaissance car	South Africa	60	Mk 6
Ferret	Scout Car	United Kingdom	28	Mk 2/2.
Marmon-Herrington	Reconnaissance car	South Africa		
T17E1 Staghound	Reconnaissance car	United States	20	Combat ineffective for the Bush War
Utility trucks
Mercedes-Benz L1517	Utility Truck	West Germany		
Mercedes-Benz LA911B	Utility Truck	West Germany		
Mercedes-Benz LA1113/42	Utility Truck	West Germany		
Bedford MK	Utility truck	United Kingdom		
Bedford RL	Utility truck	United Kingdom		
Unimog 416	Utility Truck	West Germany		
Armoured personnel carriers
Buffel	Wheeled Personnel Carrier	South Africa		
Bullet	Infantry Fighting Vehicle	Rhodesia	1	
Crocodile	Wheeled Personnel Carrier	Rhodesia	130	
MAP75	Wheeled Personnel Carrier	Rhodesia	200–300	
MAP45	Wheeled Personnel Carrier	Rhodesia	100–200	
Leopard	MPAV	Rhodesia		
Mine Protected Combat Vehicle	Infantry Fighting Vehicle	Zimbabwe Rhodesia	60	
Pookie	Mine Detection and Removal (by Contact) vehicle	Rhodesia		Built on Volkswagen Kombi chassis.
Hippo	Wheeled Personnel Carrier	South Africa		
Shorland	Armoured Car	United Kingdom	2	Custom hulls and Ferret turrets.
Thyssen Henschel UR-416	Armoured Personnel Carrier	West Germany	10	
Universal Carrier	Armoured Personnel Carrier	United Kingdom	30	Improved Universal Bren carrier.
Tanks
T-34	Medium Tank	Soviet Union	15	Captured from Mozambique.
T-55	Main Battle Tank	Poland/Soviet Union	8	Polish T-55LD tanks provided by South Africa.
4×4 light vehicles
Mazda B1600	Light truck	Japan	300	Fitted with machine gun turret.
Land Rover	4×4 Vehicle	United Kingdom		Mine-resistant variant designated Armadillo.
Willys MB	Jeep	United States		M38.

=== Artillery ===
Name	Type	Country of Origin	In Service	Notes
BL 5.5	140mm Howitzer	United Kingdom	4	
BM-21 Grad	122mm Multiple Rocket Launcher	Soviet Union		Captured.
L16	81mm Mortar	United Kingdom	30	
M101	105mm Howitzer	United States	6	
Ordnance QF 25 pounder	87mm Howitzer	United Kingdom	18	
OTO Melara Mod 56	105mm Howitzer	Italy	18	

=== Air Defence ===
Name	Type	Country of Origin	In Service	Notes
37mm Gun M1	Anti-aircraft gun	United States		
Oerlikon 20 mm cannon	Anti-aircraft gun	Switzerland	1	Captured.
Zastava M55 20mm autocannon	Anti-aircraft gun	Yugoslavia		Captured.
Strela 2	Surface-To-Air Missile System	Soviet Union	15	Captured.
ZPU	Anti-aircraft gun	Soviet Union	10	Captured.
ZU-23-2	Anti-aircraft gun	Soviet Union		Captured.

=== Air force equipment ===
Name	Type	Country of Origin	In Service	Notes
Aermacchi AL-60	Utility Aircraft	Italy	9	AL-60F-5 "Trojan".
Aermacchi SF.260	Trainer Aircraft/Light Attack Aircraft	Italy	31	SF.260C and SF.260W "Genet".
SNIAS Alouette-II	Light Transport Helicopter	France	8	
Aérospatiale Alouette III	Helicopter	France	48	Several supplied by the SAAF.
Beechcraft Baron	Transport Aircraft	United States	1	Baron 95 C-55.
Bell UH-1 Iroquois	Helicopter	United States	11	Agusta-Bell 205A. Used very late in the war.
Britten-Norman Islander	Transport Aircraft	United Kingdom	6	
Canadair North Star	Transport Aircraft	Canada	4	C-4 Argonaut.
Cessna 185	Utility Aircraft	United States	17	
Cessna 421	Transport Aircraft	United States	1	
Cessna Skymaster	Light Attack Aircraft	United States	21	Reims-Cessna FTB 337G 'Lynx'.
de Havilland Vampire	Fighter	United Kingdom	32	
Douglas C-47 Dakota	Transport Aircraft	United States	12	
Douglas DC-7	Transport Aircraft	United States	2	
English Electric Canberra	Bomber	United Kingdom	18	
Hawker Hunter	Fighter	United Kingdom	13	Hunter FGA 9.
North American T-6 Texan	Trainer Aircraft	United States	21	AT-6 Harvard, sold to South Africa.
Percival Pembroke	Transport Aircraft	United Kingdom	2	Percival Pembroke C.1
Percival Provost	Trainer Aircraft	United Kingdom	16	Provost Mk 52.
Supermarine Spitfire	Fighter	United Kingdom	22	Mk 22.
Golf	General-purpose bomb	Rhodesia		
Alpha	Cluster bombs	Rhodesia		The Canberra carried 300 Alpha bombs in groups of 50 inside six hoppers fitted to the bomb bay
SNEB 68mm	Aircraft rockets	France		

== See also ==
- British South Africa Police
- Rhodesian Light Infantry
- Selous Scouts
- Grey's Scouts
- List of weapons of the Rhodesian Bush War
- Rhodesian African Rifles
- Rhodesian Armoured Corps
- Rhodesian Air Force
- Fireforce
- Security Force Auxiliaries

== Notes and references ==
Journal articles

- Lohman, Major Charles M.; MacPherson, Major Robert I. (7 June 1983). "Rhodesia: Tactical Victory, Strategic Defeat" (PDF). War Since 1945 Seminar and Symposium. Quantico, Virginia: Marine Corps Command and Staff College. Archived from the original (PDF) on 7 April 2023.

Bibliography

- Abbott, Peter; Botham, Philip (June 1986). Modern African Wars: Rhodesia, 1965–80. Oxford: Osprey Publishing. ISBN 978-0-85045-728-5.
- Binda, Alexandre (November 2007). Heppenstall, David (ed.). Masodja: The History of the Rhodesian African Rifles and its forerunner the Rhodesian Native Regiment. Johannesburg: 30° South Publishers. ISBN 978-1920143039.
- Cilliers, Jakkie (December 1984). Counter-Insurgency in Rhodesia. London, Sydney & Dover, New Hampshire: Croom Helm. ISBN 978-0-7099-3412-7.
- Gale, William Daniel (1973). The years between 1923–1973: half a century of responsible government in Rhodesia. Salisbury: H. C. P. Andersen.
- Locke, Peter G; Cooke, Peter D F (1995). Fighting Vehicles and Weapons of Rhodesia 1965–80. Wellington: P & P Publishing. ISBN 978-0-47302-413-0. OCLC 40535718.
- Rogers, Anthony (1998). Someone Else's War: Mercenaries from 1960 to the Present. Hammersmith: HarperCollins. ISBN 978-0-00-472077-7.
- Shortt, James; McBride, Angus (1981). The Special Air Service. Oxford: Osprey Publishing. ISBN 0-85045-396-8.
- Young, Kenneth (1969). Rhodesia and Independence: a study in British colonial policy. London: J. M. Dent & Sons.
