= Combined Operations (Rhodesia) =

Rhodesian Security Forces coordinating body

- Active: 1977–1980
- Country: Rhodesia
- Type: Headquarters
- Engagements: Rhodesian Bush War

Commanders
- Notable commanders: Peter Walls

Combined Operations (commonly abbreviated as COMOPS) was a high level body established in 1977 to lead the efforts of the Rhodesian Security Forces during the Rhodesian Bush War. It was commanded by Lieutenant General Peter Walls. Prime Minister Ian Smith did not delegate formal authority to set overall policies or direct the actions of the security forces to Walls. The Combined Operations Headquarters also lacked the planning and intelligence staff needed to effectively carry out its functions. As a result, COMOPS mainly operated as an coordination body. Walls personally directed many attacks against Rhodesia's neighbours and other aspects of the war, at times independently of political control. Combined Operations was replaced by the Joint High Command following Rhodesia's transition to Zimbabwe in 1980.

== History ==
=== Establishment ===
As the security situation for Rhodesia deteriorated from 1972 some senior Rhodesian Army officers and leaders of the police Special Branch began to call for the establishment of a single body to direct operations against the guerrilla forces. This was modelled on the success of an equivalent body headed by Sir Gerald Templer during the Malayan Emergency. The Rhodesian Prime Minister Ian Smith resisted these proposals, as he believed that he was the appropriate person to lead the overall military and security campaign with the Operations Coordination Committee handling most matters and escalating key decisions to him. Smith was also unwilling to delegate authority over the war as he was concerned that this could undermine his leadership.

Following years of pressure from the security forces and his Rhodesian Front party, Smith appointed Roger Hawkins to the new position of Minister of Combined Operations on 23 March 1977. As part of this change, it was also decided to establish a Combined Operations Headquarters led by the Commander, Combined Operations to "exercise command over all elements of the security forces, as well as civil agencies directly in the prosecution of operations against the terrorists". The commander was also given direct control over the Rhodesian special forces, including the Selous Scouts and Special Air Service. Lieutenant General Peter Walls, the head of the Army, was appointed as the Commander, Combined Operations. He also led the National Joint Operations Centre (NATJOC) that was established to replace the Operations Coordination Committee. The headquarters of Combined Operations was located in a building next door to that which housed the Prime Minister's office in central Salisbury.

=== Operations ===
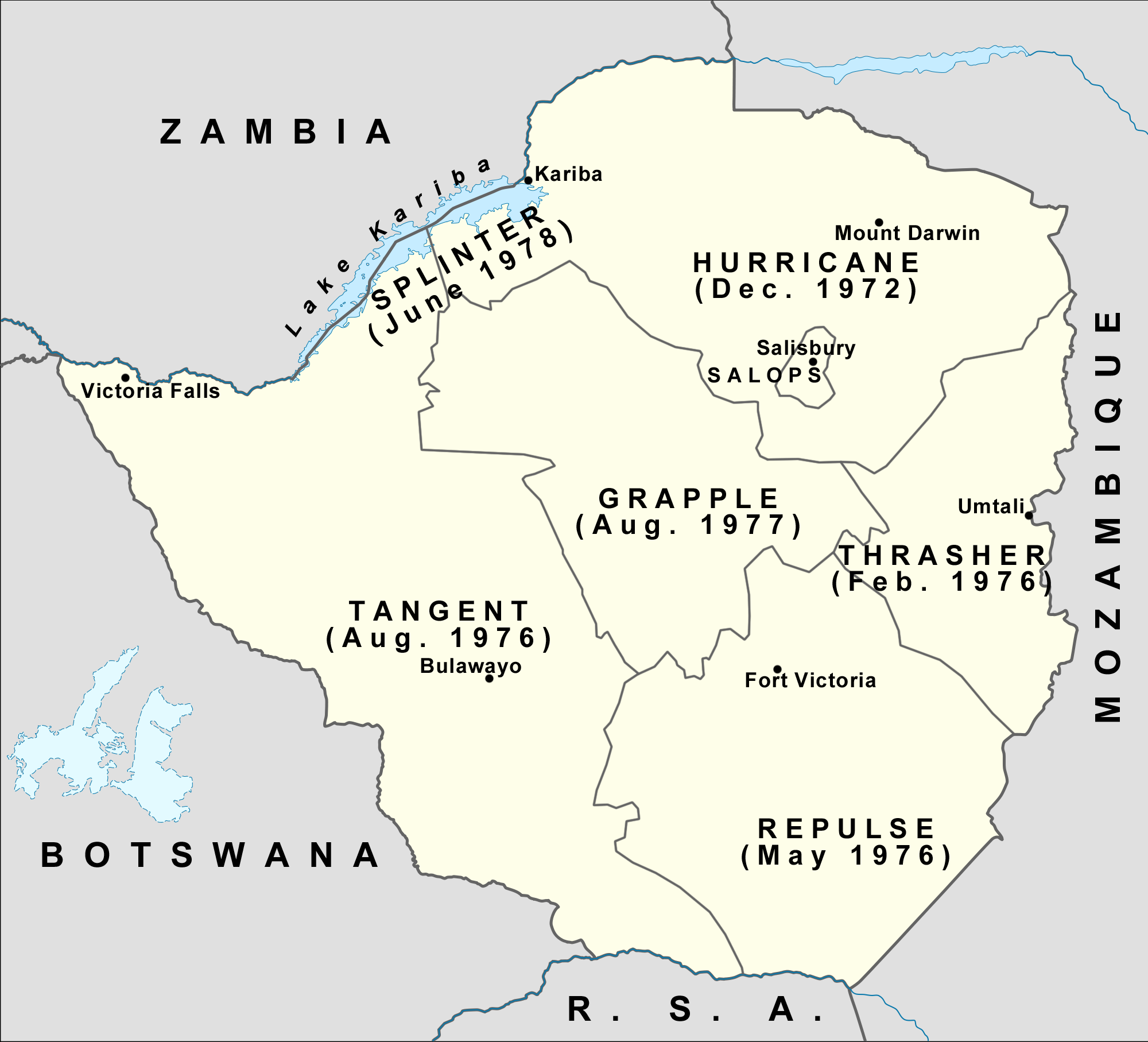
A map showing the theatres controlled by each Joint Operations Centre during the Rhodesian Bush War. COMOPS was meant to coordinate these efforts, but lacked the formal authority and capabilities to do so effectively.

While Walls was meant to be able to lead the efforts of the Joint Operations Centres that had been established over previous years in each theatre of the war and the security forces, he was never granted the authority to do so. As he was not promoted to full general, he also held the same rank as the heads of the Army, Rhodesian Air Force, police service and Central Intelligence Organisation. As a result, Walls could only issue directives in the name of the NATJOC, which was a coordination body and lacked authority over the Ministry of Internal Affairs and Ministry of Law and Order. NATJOC was also hindered by rivalries between its members. Taken together, this meant that COMOPS and the NATJOC had less ability to direct the war than the Operations Coordination Committee. Walls repeatedly asked Smith to clarify what his authority was, without success. Smith preferred to personally direct the war effort, formally and informally, until it ended and a transition to a black majority government occurred during June 1979.

COMOPS Headquarters included a secretariat and planning staff and an operations staff. The operations staff developed plans for operations that fell under COMOPS' authority, such as those involving the special forces. The planning staff was intended to develop long-term plans, but never did so. As the services' planning staffs remained separate from COMOPS, the headquarters lacked the ability to develop high quality plans. COMOPS headquarters also did not include logistics staff, though it collaborated well with the services' logisticians. More seriously, it also lacked a central body for coordinating intelligence which meant that its plans were often not well informed. A Headquarters, Special Forces was established on 1 July 1978 to oversee special operations conducted by forces assigned to COMOPS.

In his role as commander of the special forces, Walls often personally led attacks made by Rhodesian forces against guerrilla bases in neighbouring countries, including from his command aircraft. He also often sought to direct minor details of operations led by the Joint Operations Centres, to the frustration of their commanders. COMOPS did not develop a national strategy for the war until it was nearing its conclusion.

Bishop Abel Muzorewa assumed the positions of Minister for Defence and Minister for Combined Operations following his election as prime minister in May 1979. In practice, the security forces remained loyal to Smith and the white minority, and COMOPS increasingly ran the war independently of political control.

=== Replacement ===
Following Rhodesia's transition to majority rule in 1980, Prime Minister Robert Mugabe asked Walls to lead the establishment of the Zimbabwe National Army that integrated former Rhodesian and guerrilla forces. COMOPS was disbanded and a new Joint High Command was formed, which was also initially chaired by Walls. Walls resigned on 17 July 1980.

In 1997 the government of Zimbabwe revived the Combined Operations concept by establishing the Joint Operations Command. This body comprised the heads of the Zimbabwean army, air force, police, prison and intelligence services.

== Assessments ==
The RAND Corporation and the historian Jakkie Cilliers have judged that COMOPS was not a success. A RAND report noted that "in the final result COMOPS did not meet the expectations of the security forces or the government". It noted that Walls was not granted the absolute power that Templer had been given in Malaya, and that this was not feasible in the Rhodesian system given Smith's role. Paul L. Moorcraft and Peter McLaughlin have written that COMOPS formed part of a "command structure of Kafkaesque proportions" and "the creation of COMOPS tended to increase rather than diminish inter-service and inter-departmental rivalry".

Moorcraft and McLaughlin argued in 1982 that as the Selous Scouts came under the direct command of the Commander, Combined Operations, the most senior officers in the Rhodesian security forces were complicit in at least some of the atrocities the unit committed.
