= Security Force Auxiliaries =

Rhodesian paramilitary

Flag of the Security Force Auxiliaries

The Security Force Auxiliaries (Pfumo Re Vanhu) was a Rhodesian black private paramilitary organization formed during the Rhodesian Bush War in 1978 under the Zimbabwe-Rhodesia government. Ndabaningi Sithole, founder of the Zimbabwe African National Union, and Abel Muzorewa, the first and only Prime Minister of Zimbabwe Rhodesia, led the auxiliaries by 1979. Like the Rhodesian Security Forces and their guerrilla opponents, SFAs used torture to extract information.

== History ==
In 1978, the Rhodesian Special Branch created the first SFA in the Msana Tribal Trust Lands (TTL). While the Rhodesian government intended for them only to serve as pro-government, anti-Communist militias, author Matthew Preston argues they became Prime Minister Muzorewa and Ndabaningi Sithole's "private armies."

Not only did the auxiliaries protect voters, but in some cities, such as Karoi, Chinamore and Seki, they fought and defeated the Patriotic Front.

== Manpower ==
By 1979, there were 2,000 auxiliaries.

By April 1980, there were 10,000 auxiliaries.
