= Crocodile armoured personnel carrier =

- Type: Armoured personnel carrier
- Place of origin: Rhodesia

Service history
- In service: 1977–present
- Used by: Rhodesia; Zimbabwe; United States
- Wars: Rhodesian Bush War; 1980 Entumbane clashes 1981 Entumbane uprising Mozambican Civil War; Second Congo War

Specifications
- Mass: 6.55 tonnes (empty); 11.55 tonnes (combat)
- Length: 7.65 m
- Width: 2.25 m
- Height: 3.1 m
- Crew: 2+16
- Armor: 10 to 40 mm
- Main armament: one 7.62 mm, 12.7 mm or 14.5 mm machine guns
- Secondary armament: personal weapons through gunports
- Engine: Standard Nissan 6.54 litre diesel 160 hp
- Power/weight: hp/ton hp/tonne
- Suspension: wheels, 4 × 4
- Operational range: 600 to 700 km
- Maximum speed: 90 km/h

The Crocodile armoured personnel carrier or "Croc" is a Rhodesian armoured personnel carrier first introduced in 1977 and based on Japanese commercial heavy-duty trucks' chassis. It remains in use with the Zimbabwe National Army (ZNA).

== General description ==
Built on a Nissan Diesel UG780, Toyota DA110/DA115 or Isuzu TX series 5-tonne truck chassis, the Crocodile consisted of an open-topped hull or 'capsule' faceted at the sides, which were designed to deflect small-arms' rounds, and a flat bottom or 'deck' reinforced by a v-shaped 'crush box' meant to deflect landmine blasts. Three inverted U-shaped high 'Roll bars' were fitted to protect the fighting compartment from being crushed in case the vehicle turned and roll over after a mine detonation.

=== Protection ===
The Crocodile was appreciated for its protection against landmines and ambush, since its hull was made of welded ballistic 10mm mild steel plate, whilst the front windscreen and side windows had 40mm bullet-proof laminated glass. However, the heavy "Croc"'s hull added about 3 tonnes of armour to a commercial truck chassis nominally road rated at 7.5 tonnes, placing a strain especially on its clutch and brakes.

=== Armament ===
Rhodesian "Crocs" were usually armed with a FN MAG-58 7.62mm Light Machine Gun (LMG), sometimes installed on a locally produced one-man machine gunner armoured turret to protect the gunner. Vehicles assigned to convoy escorting duties ('E-type') had a Browning M1919A4 7.62mm medium machine gun mounted on an open-topped, cylinder-shaped turret (dubbed 'the dustbin'), whilst those employed on 'externals' received a tall, square-shaped and fully enclosed MAG turret mounted on the roof over the commander's seat. The Zimbabwean vehicles after 1980 sported pintle-mounted Soviet-made 12.7mm and 14.5mm Heavy Machine Guns (HMG) instead.

== Variants ==
- Troop-Carrying Vehicle (TCV) – is the standard IFV/APC fully protected version, armed with either a single LMG (Rhodesian SF 1978–79) or HMG (ZNA 1980–present) and capable of accommodating 16 infantrymen.
- Convoy escorting version – designated 'E-type', this is a basic IFV/APC version fitted with a turret, either the 'dustbin' with Browning MG or the 'box' variant with MAG-58 LMG.
- Light TCV version – standard IFV/APC version with scaled-down armour.
- Jackal – unarmed civilian version employed by the Rhodesian Posts & Telecommunications Corporation (PTC).

== Combat history ==
The Crocodile APC was employed by the Rhodesian Light Infantry (RLI) late in the war on Fireforce operations and on their cross-border covert raids ('externals') against ZIPRA and ZANLA guerrilla bases in the neighboring Countries, such as the September 1979 raid on the ZANLA's New Chimoio base in Mozambique (Operation Miracle).

After independence, the Crocodile APC entered service with the Zimbabwe National Army (ZNA) in early 1980. In November that year, ZNA's "Crocs" were thrown into action against ZIPRA troops at the 1st Battle of Entumbane and later at the February 1981 2nd Battle of Entumbane (near Bulawayo, Matabeleland), and later again after February 1982 by helping to put down the Super-ZAPU insurgency also in Matabeleland.

During the Mozambican Civil War, they were employed by the ZNA forces in Mozambique guarding the Mutare–Beira oil pipeline in 1982–1993, and served with Zimbabwe troops in the ill-fated United Nations' peacekeeping mission in Somalia (UNOSOM I) from 1992 to 1994. During that assignment, a few "Crocs" were loaned to the U.S. Marines contingent for convoy escort and security duties in the Mogadishu area. The "Crocs" served with the ZNA contingent sent to the Democratic Republic of Congo during the Second Congo War from 1998 to 2002.

== Operators ==
- Zimbabwe – About 40 vehicles still in service with the ZNA.

=== Former operators ===
- Rhodesia – 130 vehicles in service with the Rhodesian Security Forces in 1977–1980 passed on to successor state.
- United States – Unknown number in service with the U.S. Marines in Somalia 1992–1994.

== See also ==
- Bullet TCV
- Hippo APC
- List of weapons of the Rhodesian Bush War
- MAP45 armoured personnel carrier
- MAP75 armoured personnel carrier
- Mine Protected Combat Vehicle
- Rhodesian Armoured Corps
- Thyssen Henschel UR-416
