= MAP45 armoured personnel carrier =

- Type: Armoured personnel carrier
- Place of origin: Rhodesia

Service history
- In service: 1978–present
- Used by: Rhodesia; Zimbabwe
- Wars: Rhodesian Bush War; 1980 Entumbane clashes 1981 Entumbane uprising Mozambican Civil War; Second Congo War

Specifications
- Mass: 9 tonnes (combat); 7.59 tonnes (empty)
- Length: 6.6 m
- Width: 2.28 m
- Height: 2.9 m
- Crew: 2+12
- Armor: 10 mm mild steel
- Main armament: one 7.62 mm, 12.7 mm or 14.5 mm machine guns
- Secondary armament: personal weapons through gunports
- Engine: 6-cylinder 5.67L Benz diesel OM352; 110 hp
- Power/weight: hp/ton hp/tonne
- Drive: 4 × 4
- Operational range: 600 to 700 km
- Maximum speed: 80 km/h/60 km/h km/h

The MAP45 armoured personnel carrier (a.k.a. MAP 'four five') is a Rhodesian/Zimbabwean 4x4d heavy troop-carrying vehicle (TCV) first introduced in 1978 based on a Mercedes-Benz truck chassis. It remains in use with the Zimbabwe National Army.

== History ==
The MAP45 Armoured Personnel Carrier ('MAP' stands for mine and ambush protected in Rhodesian military jargon) was developed in 1977-78 by the Rhodesian Army Workshops as a light version of the MAP75 TCV. Production started early in 1978 at Army Workshops but in order to meet the increasing demand, manufacture was contracted out to the Rhodesian private firm Zambesi Coachworks Ltd of Salisbury (now Harare).

== General description ==
The MAP45 consists of an all-welded body with a cut-down troop compartment built on a modified Mercedes-Benz LA911B 4.5 ton Series truck chassis ('Rodef 45'). Adapted from the MAP75 TCV, the open-topped hull or 'capsule' is faceted at the sides, which were designed to deflect small-arms' rounds, and a flat deck reinforced by a v-shaped 'crush box' meant to deflect mine blasts. Three inverted U-shaped low 'Roll bars' were fitted to protect the fighting compartment from being crushed in case the vehicle turned and roll over after a landmine detonation. Due to the shortened top hull, their reduced height presented less of a problem since it did not hamper movements inside the troop compartment as in the MAP75.

=== Protection ===
The hull was made of ballistic 10mm mild steel plate; front windscreen and side windows had 40mm bullet-proof laminated glass.

=== Armament ===
Rhodesian MAP45s were usually armed with a FN MAG-58 7.62mm Light Machine Gun (LMG), sometimes installed on a locally produced one-man MG armoured turret to protect the gunner. Vehicles assigned to convoy escorting duties ('E-type') had a Browning M1919A4 7.62mm medium machine gun mounted on an open-topped, cylinder-shaped turret (dubbed 'the dustbin'). For 'externals' twin Browning MG pintle mounts were sometimes fitted, placed behind the driver's compartment. The Zimbabwean vehicles after 1980 sported single pintle-mounted Soviet-made 12.7mm and 14.5mm Heavy Machine Guns (HMG) instead.

== Variants ==
- Troop-Carrying Vehicle (TCV) – is the standard IFV/APC version, armed with either a single LMG (Rhodesian SF 1978-79) or HMG (ZNA 1980-present) and capable of carrying 12 infantrymen.
- Convoy escorting version – designated 'E-type', this is a basic IFV/APC version fitted with the Browning MG 'dustbin' turret.
- Command vehicle – command version equipped with radios and map boards.

== Combat history ==
The MAP45 TCV soon became a popular vehicle among the elite units of the Rhodesian Security Forces – including the Rhodesian African Rifles (RAR), the Rhodesian Light Infantry (RLI), the Selous Scouts and the Rhodesian SAS – who employed it late in the war on Fireforce operations and on their cross-border covert raids ('externals') against ZIPRA and ZANLA guerrilla bases in the neighboring Countries, such as the September 1979 raid on the ZANLA's New Chimoio base in Mozambique (Operation Miracle).

After independence, the MAP45 entered service with the Zimbabwe National Army (ZNA) in early 1980 and participated in the large military exercises conducted at Somabula Plain, Matabeleland that same year. ZNA's 'Four Fives' were thrown into action in November 1980 against ZIPRA troops at the 1st Battle of Entumbane and later at the February 1981 2nd Battle of Entumbane (near Bulawayo, Matabeleland), and later again after February 1982 by helping to put down the Super-ZAPU insurgency in Matabeleland. The converted MAP45 TCVs were also employed by the ZNA forces in Mozambique during the Mozambican Civil War, guarding the Mutare–Beira oil pipeline from 1982 to 1993. The MAP45 later served with the ZNA contingent sent to the Democratic Republic of Congo during the Second Congo War from 1998 to 2002.

== Operators ==
- Rhodesia – some 200 or 300 vehicles in service with the Rhodesian Security Forces in 1978-1980 passed on to successor state.
- Zimbabwe – Still in service with the ZNA.

== See also ==
- Bullet TCV
- Crocodile armoured personnel carrier
- Hippo APC
- List of weapons of the Rhodesian Bush War
- MAP75 armoured personnel carrier
- Mine Protected Combat Vehicle
- Rhodesian Armoured Corps
- Thyssen Henschel UR-416
