= MAP75 armoured personnel carrier =

- Type: Armoured personnel carrier
- Place of origin: Rhodesia

Service history
- In service: 1978–present
- Used by: Rhodesia; Zimbabwe
- Wars: Rhodesian Bush War; 1980 Entumbane clashes 1981 Entumbane uprising Mozambican Civil War; Second Congo War

Specifications
- Mass: 11 tonnes (combat); 9.29 tonnes (empty)
- Length: 7.2 m x 2.28 m
- Width: 4.2 m Wb
- Height: 2.84 m
- Crew: 2+16
- Armor: 10 mm mild steel
- Main armament: one 7.62 mm, 12.7 mm or 14.5 mm machine guns
- Secondary armament: personal weapons through gunports
- Engine: 6-cylinder 5.67L Benz diesel OM352; 130 hp
- Power/weight: hp/ton hp/tonne
- Drive: 4 × 4
- Operational range: 600 to 700 km
- Maximum speed: 80 km/h/60 km/h km/h

The MAP75 armoured personnel carrier (a.k.a. MAP 'seven five') is a Rhodesian 4x4 heavy troop-carrying vehicle (TCV) first introduced in 1978 based on a Mercedes-Benz truck chassis. It remains in use with the Zimbabwe National Army.

== General description ==
The MAP75 consists of an all-welded body with a fully enclosed troop compartment built on a modified Mercedes-Benz 7.5 ton Series LA1113/42 truck chassis ('Rodef 75'). Adapted from the Crocodile Armoured Personnel Carrier, the open-topped hull or 'capsule' is faceted at the sides, which were designed to deflect small-arms' rounds, and a flat deck reinforced by a v-shaped 'crush box' meant to deflect landmine blasts. Three inverted U-shaped 'roll bars' shorter than those on the Crocodile were fitted to protect the fighting compartment from being crushed in case the vehicle turned and roll over after a mine detonation. However, the reduced height of the 'roll bars' often hampered the crew's movements inside the vehicle, though the problem was rectified only in the post-war Zimbabwean versions by fitting higher bars. Access to the vehicle's interior is made by means of two medium-sized doors at the vertical hull rear whilst two square hatches placed low at the hull sides allowed for rapid debussing, an innovation that reflected the vehicle's combat offensive role.

=== Protection ===
The hull was made of ballistic 10mm mild steel plate; front windscreen and side windows had 40mm bullet-proof laminated glass.

=== Armament ===
Rhodesian MAP75s were usually armed with a FN MAG-58 7.62mm Light Machine Gun (LMG), sometimes installed on a locally produced one-man MG armoured turret to protect the gunner. Vehicles assigned to convoy escorting duties ('E-type') had a Browning M1919A4 7.62mm medium machine gun mounted on an open-topped, cylinder-shaped turret (dubbed 'the dustbin'). Twin Browning MG pintle mounts placed behind the driver’s compartment were often added on 'Seven fives' employed for 'externals'. The Zimbabwean vehicles after 1980 sported pintle-mounted Soviet-made 12.7mm and 14.5mm Heavy Machine Guns (HMG) instead.

== Variants ==
- Troop-Carrying Vehicle (TCV) or "Puma" – is the standard IFV/APC version, armed with either a single LMG (Rhodesian SF 1978-79) or HMG (ZNA 1980–present) and capable of carrying 16 infantrymen.
- Convoy escorting version – basic IFV/APC version ('E-type') fitted with 'dustbin' Browning MG turret (Rhodesian SF 1978-79).
- Command vehicle – command version equipped with radios and map boards.
- Ambulance – modified version of the command vehicle intended for medical support and casualty evacuation.
- Cargo vehicle – transport version with shortened, open-top cargo hull.
- Articulated tractor – heavy transport truck with a four-wheel cargo trailer.
- Horse-carrying vehicle (HCV) – modified transport version with wooden box for horses ('horse box').
- Armoured horse-carrying vehicle – one specially-modified articulated tractor in service with the Grey's Scouts, later converted to a mobile operations and command room (Rhodesian SF 1978-79).
- Wrecker – recovery version with shortened cab mounting a 6-tonne Model 600 Holmes jib, with A-frame and tooling.

== Combat history ==
The MAP75 TCV was employed late in the war by the elite units of the Rhodesian Security Forces – the Rhodesian African Rifles (RAR), the Rhodesian Light Infantry (RLI), the Selous Scouts and the Rhodesian SAS – on Fireforce operations and on their cross-border covert raids ('externals') against ZIPRA and ZANLA guerrilla bases in the neighboring Countries, such as the September 1979 raid on the ZANLA's New Chimoio base in Mozambique (Operation Miracle).

After independence, the MAP75 entered service with the Zimbabwe National Army (ZNA) in early 1980 and equipped both the 1st and 2nd Battalions, RAR, which participated in the large military exercises conducted at Somabula Plain, Matabeleland that same year. ZNA's 'Seven Fives' were thrown into action in November 1980 against ZIPRA troops at the 1st Battle of Entumbane and later at the February 1981 2nd Battle of Entumbane (near Bulawayo, Matabeleland), and later again after February 1982 by helping to put down the Super-ZAPU insurgency in Matabeleland. During the Mozambican Civil War, 'Seven Fives' were also employed by the ZNA forces in Mozambique guarding the Mutare–Beira oil pipeline in 1982-1993 from RENAMO guerrilla attacks. The MAP75 served with the ZNA contingent sent to the Democratic Republic of Congo during the Second Congo War from 1998 to 2002.

== Operators ==
- Rhodesia – In service with the Rhodesian Security Forces in 1978-1980 passed on to successor state.
- Zimbabwe – Still in service with the ZNA.

== See also ==
- Crocodile Armoured Personnel Carrier
- Hippo APC
- List of weapons of the Rhodesian Bush War
- MAP45 Armoured Personnel Carrier
- Mine Protected Combat Vehicle
- Rhodesian Armoured Corps
- Thyssen Henschel UR-416
