= Bullet TCV =

Bullet Armoured Personnel Carrier
- Type: Armoured car
- Place of origin: Rhodesia

Service history
- In service: 1978–1980
- Used by: Rhodesia
- Wars: Rhodesian Bush War

Specifications
- Mass: 7.2 tonnes
- Length: 4.95 m
- Width: 2.4 m
- Height: 2.8 m
- Crew: 2+10
- Armor: 4.5 to 10 mm
- Main armament: one 7.62 mm, 12.7 mm or 14.5 mm machine guns
- Secondary armament: personal weapons through gunports
- Engine: Daimler-Benz OM352 turbo diesel 120 hp
- Power/weight: hp/ton hp/tonne
- Suspension: wheels, 4 × 4
- Operational range: 700 km
- Maximum speed: 80 km/h/60 km/h km/h

The Bullet Troop-Carrying Vehicle (TCV) is a light 4x4 armoured car demonstrator developed by Rhodesia in the late 1970s based on the body of the Mercedes-Benz Unimog light truck.

== History ==
At the late 1970s when the Rhodesian Bush War was entering its final phase, the Rhodesian Security Forces (RhSF) were faced with an escalation towards conventional warfare when they learned that a mechanised built-up was being undertaken by the Zimbabwe People's Revolutionary Army (ZIPRA) guerrilla organisation based in neighbouring Zambia with material assistance from the Soviet Union. Eventually, by mid-1979 ZIPRA had brought to strength a fairly sizeable armoured corps trained by Cuban advisers, which aligned five BRDM-2 reconnaissance armoured cars, six to ten T-34/85 tanks and fifteen BTR-152 wheeled APCs.

To deal with the potential threat of a possible conventional ground invasion from across the border, the Rhodesian Armoured Car Regiment (RhACR) was reorganized in 1978, being expanded to corps strength to include additional tank and mechanized infantry squadrons. It soon became clear however, that the latter had to be provided with fast, more mobile troop-carrying vehicles (TCV) designed for conventional armoured warfare. The heavier locally tailored TCVs – conceived primarily for the counterinsurgency role – already in service with the Rhodesian SF were found to be not entirely suitable for the task so a lighter (and cheaper) alternative was sought.

=== Development ===
The Bullet was originally developed by the Rhodesian private firm Zambesi Coachworks Ltd of Salisbury (now Harare) to meet a requirement put by the Rhodesian Army for a low-cost mine-protected IFV mounted on a Unimog chassis capable of carrying 10 men. The first prototype was completed in late 1978 (open-topped in the original design).

== General description ==
The second prototype presented in 1978 was a low vehicle which consisted of an all-welded body with a fully enclosed troop compartment built on a modified Mercedes-Benz U1100 Unimog 416 2.5 ton light truck chassis. The hull or 'capsule' was faceted at the sides and rear, and a sloping glacis at the front, designed to deflect small-arms' rounds, along with a v-shaped bottom meant to deflect landmine blasts. The Diamond-shaped glacis had a pair of built-in round headlights at the sides of the radiator grid, a large dual-split front windscreen and two smaller side windows. Access to the vehicle's interior was made by means of two medium-sized doors at the hull rear whilst two roof hatches placed at the top of the troop compartment allowed for rapid debussing plus eight firing ports, six in the hull sides and two at the rear doors.

=== Protection ===
The hull was made of ballistic 10mm mild steel plate; front windscreen and side windows had 40mm bullet-proof laminated glass.

=== Armament ===
A pintle-mounted FN MAG-58 7.62×51mm NATO light machine-gun could be fitted on the top roof.

== Service history ==
After being rejected, it ended the war as a training vehicle for the RhACR and it was shown to the editor of Soldier of Fortune Magazine, Robert K. Brown in early 1979.

== See also ==
- Crocodile armoured personnel carrier
- Gazelle FRV
- Hippo APC
- List of weapons of the Rhodesian Bush War
- MAP45 armoured personnel carrier
- MAP75 armoured personnel carrier
- Mine Protected Combat Vehicle
- Rhodesian Armoured Corps
- Thyssen Henschel UR-416
