= MPCV =

MPCV may refer to:

- Orion Multi-Purpose Crew Vehicle, a NASA spacecraft
- Mine Protected Combat Vehicle, an infantry fighting vehicle
