= Mine Protected Combat Vehicle =

Mine Protected Combat Vehicle – MPCV
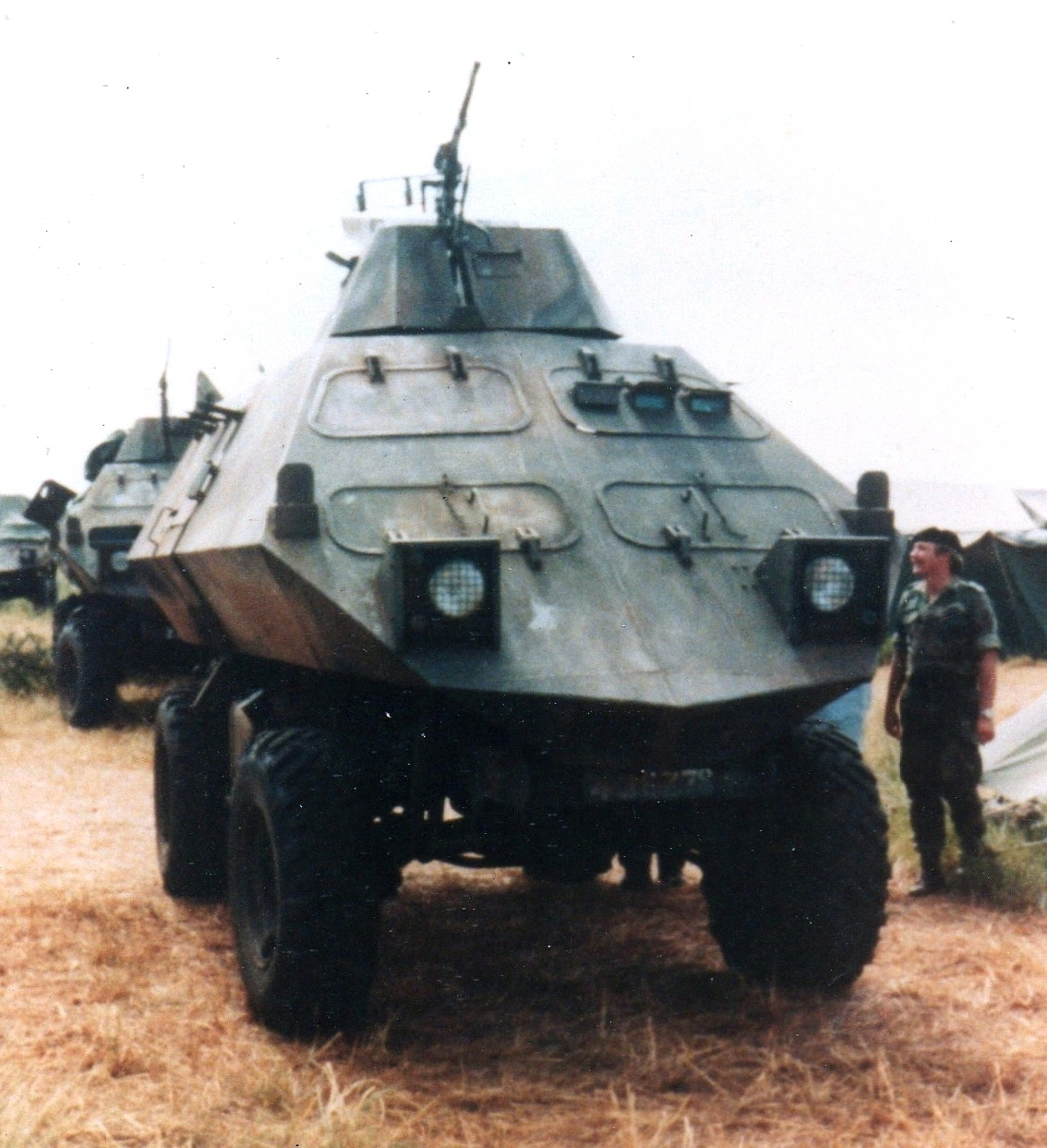
- Mine Protected Combat Vehicles (MPCV) c.1979-1980
- Type: Mine-Resistant Ambush Protected Vehicle
- Place of origin: Rhodesia

Service history
- In service: 1978–present
- Used by: Rhodesia, Zimbabwe
- Wars: 1980 Entumbane clashes 1981 Entumbane uprising Mozambican Civil War; Second Congo War; 2017 Zimbabwean coup d'état

Specifications
- Mass: 7.2 tonnes
- Length: 4.95 m
- Width: 2.4 m
- Height: 2.8 m
- Crew: 2+11
- Armor: 4.5 to 10 mm & composite
- Main armament: One 7.62 mm, 12.7 mm or 14.5 mm machine guns
- Secondary armament: Personal weapons through gunports
- Engine: Daimler-Benz OM352 turbo diesel 120 hp
- Suspension: Wheels, 4 × 4
- Operational range: 700 km
- Maximum speed: 80 km/h - 60 km/h

The Mine Protected Combat Vehicle – MPCV (a.k.a. 'Spook') was a Rhodesian 4×4 Mine-Resistant Ambush Protected Vehicle (MRAPV), first introduced in 1979 and based on the body of the Mercedes-Benz Unimog light truck. It remains in use with the Zimbabwe National Army.

== History ==
At the late 1970s when the Rhodesian Bush War was entering its final phase, the Rhodesian Security Forces (RhSF) were faced with an escalation towards conventional warfare when they learned that a mechanised built-up was being undertaken by the Zimbabwe People's Revolutionary Army (ZIPRA) guerrilla organization based in neighbouring Zambia with material assistance from the Soviet Union. Eventually, by mid-1979 ZIPRA had brought to strength a fairly sizeable armoured corps trained by Cuban advisors, which aligned five BRDM-2 reconnaissance armoured cars, six to ten T-34/85 tanks and fifteen BTR-152 wheeled APCs.

To deal with the potential threat of a possible conventional ground invasion from across the border, the Rhodesian Armoured Car Regiment (RhACR) was reorganized in 1978, being expanded to include additional tank and mechanized infantry squadrons. It soon became clear however, that the latter had to be provided with fast, more mobile troop-carrying vehicles (TCV) designed for conventional armoured warfare. The heavier locally tailored TCVs – conceived primarily for the counter-insurgency role – already in service with the Rhodesian SF were found to be not entirely suitable for the task so a lighter (and cheaper) alternative was sought.

=== Development ===
Nicknamed the 'Spook' because of the secrecy and urgency surrounding the entire project, the MPCV was originally developed jointly in 1978 by the Rhodesian private firm Kew Engineering Ltd of Gwelo (now Gweru), the RhACR and the Rhodesian Corps of Engineers (RhCE) to meet the requirements of the Rhodesian Army for a low-cost, mine and ambush protected (MAP) infantry fighting vehicle mounted on a Unimog chassis capable of carrying 10 men.

At the time, Kew Engineering designers were already working in conjunction with the RhCE in the development of the Mine Protected Mortar Carrier or MPMC (dubbed the 'Skorpion'), which was essentially a Unimog truck chassis modified to accept a base mount for an L16 81mm mortar. Under pressure to meet the eight-week deadline fixed by the Army, the designer team responded to the challenge by adapting the 'Skorpion' design, extending its v-shaped mine-protected base to cover the full length of the vehicle with cut-outs for the engine and transmission. The modified base was them sent to the 10th Battalion, Rhodesia Regiment (RR) workshops at Gwelo for the armoured top to be fitted.

A team of RhCE engineers' and RhACR and RR mechanics were able to produce in a single day an armoured steel body for the mine-protected base, its design being developed from an adapted and heavily modified hull of the West German Thyssen Henschel UR-416 armoured car. Other internal modifications requested by the RhACR, involving engine, steering, brakes and the gearbox (a deflector plate had to be added to protect it from centre landmine blasts) were also incorporated.

The first prototype of the MPCV was completed in just six weeks in late 1978 and, after intensive trials involving driving and mine testing by the Rhodesian Army the vehicle was finally approved for active service. Production began in earnest at early 1979, with Kew Engineering plants turning out four bare vehicles per week until a total of 60 MPCVs had been delivered to the 10th Battalion RR workshops at Gwelo, where they would be fitted with the electronics and armament. However, the 'Spook' project came too late to have a significant effect on the outcome of the Bush War. When the December 1979 cease-fire came into effect, the 60 vehicles were still awaiting finishing at the Gwelo workshops because there were not enough mechanics from the territorial reserve to complete them in time to see any active service in the last months of the war.

== General description ==
The MPCV consists of an all-welded body with a fully enclosed troop compartment built on a modified Mercedes-Benz U1100 Unimog 416 2.5 ton light truck chassis. The diamond-shaped glacis has two vision ports closed by armoured flaps, one for the driver and the other for the commander whilst placed below are two engine flaps and one antennae mount on each side. The headlights are bolted to the side below the engine compartment and protected by a box-shaped brush guard.

Access to the vehicle's interior is made by means of two medium-sized doors at the hull sides whilst two roof hatches placed at the top of the fighting compartment allowed for rapid debussing plus nine firing ports, four in each hull side and one at the rear door. The hull – or 'capsule' in the Rhodesian military jargon – is faceted at the sides and rear, and a sloping glacis at the front, designed to deflect small-arms' rounds, along with a v-shaped bottom meant to deflect landmine blasts.

Unlike most Rhodesian-produced mine-protected vehicles however, the capsule is not continuously solid-mounted to the chassis. Instead, it is fixed at the centre of the chassis with silent-block pivots fitted lengthways to each end, allowing the latter to flex its capacity to the fullest. Besides allowing for the vehicle to achieve a good performance off-road, such feature also helps cushion the capsule from mine detonations.

=== Protection ===
Another unusual feature of the MPCV was its composite armour hull. It consists of layers of 45mm Kaylite polystyrene sandwiched between 6mm ballistic steel plate and 19mm rubber conveyor belting. The Kaylite allowed the remaining force in the round or schrapnel to dissipate or tumble if it penetrated the armour plate, whilst providing at the same time good insulation from weather and noise. During trials however, it was found that the vehicle's armoured hull was not impervious to 7.62mm armour-piercing rounds, the interior of the troop compartment was rather cramped (internal height stands at 1.2m) and it leaked in the rain. After initial mine trials internal reinforcing roll hoops had to be added.

=== Armament ===
An octagonal one-man turret, which could accommodate a FN MAG-58 7.62×51mm NATO light machine-gun or 12.7mm and 14.5mm Heavy machine guns (HMGs) was usually fitted on the top roof of the vehicle. Trials were also conducted with a French 20mm cannon – the same chain-fed Matra MG 151/20 autocannon model installed on the Rhodesian Air Force's Alouette III helicopter gunships ('K-Cars') – mounted on a specially designed gun turret but it was not adopted by the Rhodesian Army.

== Variants ==
- Troop-Carrying Vehicle (TCV) – is the basic IFV/APC version, normally fitted with a one-man MG turret armed with either a 7.62mm LMG or 12.7mm and 14.5mm HMGs.
- Combat/close fire support – heavy version with specially designed turret fitted with a chain-fed 20mm cannon but never surpassed the prototype stage.
- Command and communications – turretless command version equipped with radios and map boards, two in service with the Zimbabwe National Army.
- Ambulance – turretless and unarmed prototype only. Never entered production.

== Combat history ==
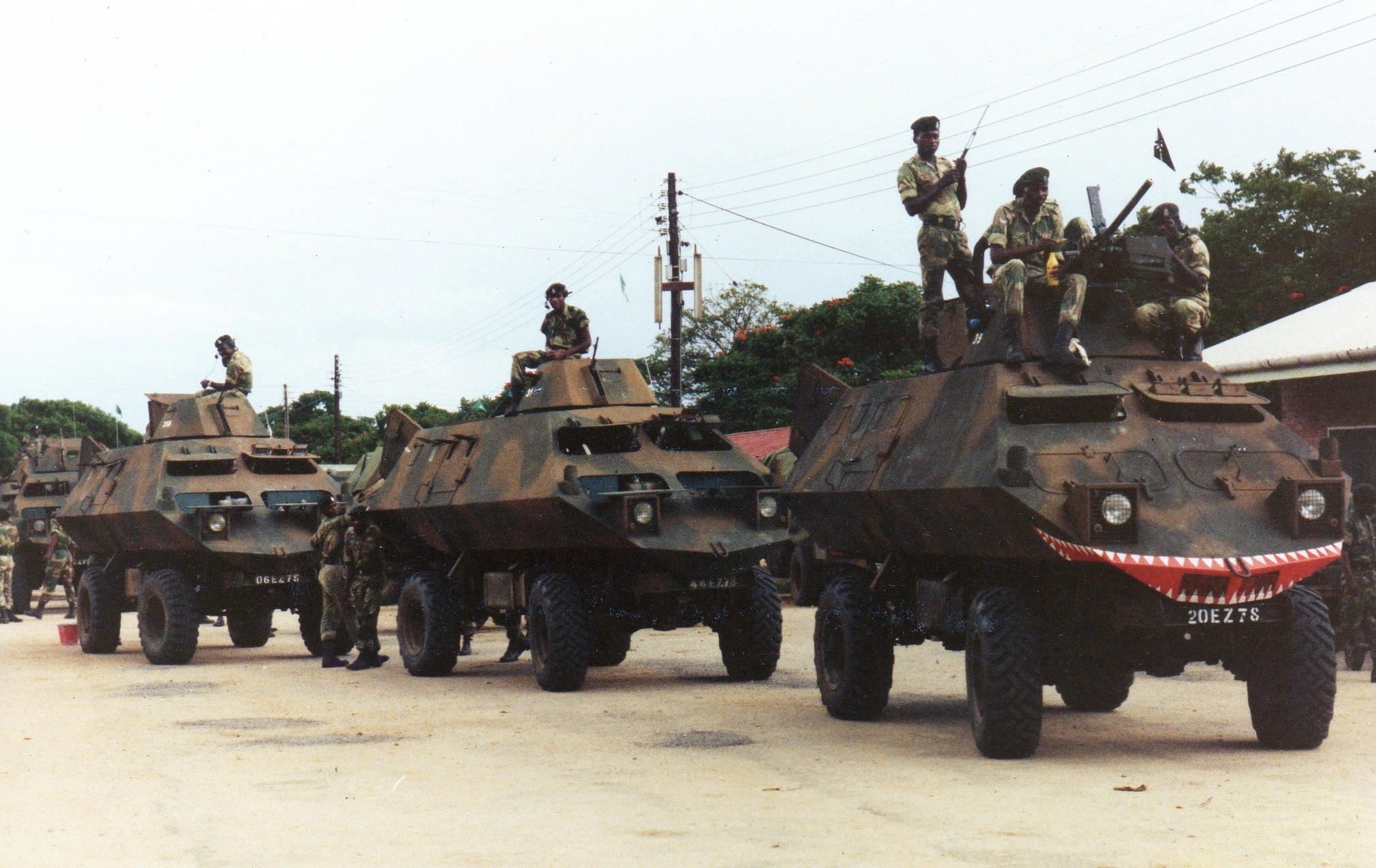
1RAR troops atop MPCV vehicles assemble at Metheun prior to Entumbane, February 1981.

Developed too late to participate in the Rhodesian Bush War, the 'Spook' after independence entered service with the Zimbabwe National Army (ZNA) who, impressed by the vehicle's mobility, quickly adopted it in early 1980. The MPCV equipped the D Squadron of the Zimbabwe Armoured Corps (formerly the RhACR) and the C Company, 1st Battalion, Rhodesian African Rifles (1RAR), which participated in the large military exercises conducted at Somabula Plain, Matabeleland that same year. It was only in November 1980 however, that the ZNA finally got the chance to trial its newly acquired armoured vehicle in combat against ZIPRA troops at the 1st Battle of Entumbane and later in the February 1981 2nd Battle of Entumbane (near Bulawayo, Matabeleland), where it acquainted itself well, and later again after February 1982 by helping to put down the Super-ZAPU insurgency in Matabeleland.

During the Mozambican Civil War in 1982–1993, the ZNA forces serving at Mozambique also employed the 'Spook' there as a patrol and escort vehicle at the vital Beira corridor in Tete Province, guarding both the Beira–Bulawayo railway and oil pipeline from RENAMO guerrilla attacks. ZNA's MPCVs found themselves once again performing these same duties in the cadre of the ill-fated United Nations' peacekeeping mission in Somalia (UNOSOM I) from 1992 to 1994, protecting the convoys of UN trucks carrying relief aid en route from Mogadishu port to the refugee camps. The MPCV served with the ZNA contingent sent to the Democratic Republic of Congo during the Second Congo War from 1998 to 2002.

== Operators ==
- Zimbabwe Rhodesia – 60 vehicles completed for the security forces by 1979, passed on to successor state in 1980.
- Zimbabwe – 115 vehicles currently in service with the Zimbabwe National Army.

== See also ==
- Buffel
- Bullet TCV
- Crocodile armoured personnel carrier
- Gazelle FRV
- Hippo APC
- List of weapons of the Rhodesian Bush War
- MAP45 armoured personnel carrier
- MAP75 armoured personnel carrier
- Rhodesian Armoured Corps
- Thyssen Henschel UR-416
