= Gazelle FRV =

- no image Gazelle FRV
- Type: armoured fighting vehicle
- Place of origin: Zimbabwe

Specifications
- Crew: 2+2
- Armor: 4.5 to 6 mm welded steel plate
- Main armament: 1 12.7mm or 14.5mm Heavy Machine Gun
- Secondary armament: 1 20mm auto cannon or 1 7.62 mm light machine gun
- Engine: Daimler-Benz OM352 turbo diesel 120 hp
- Power/weight: hp/ton hp/tonne
- Suspension: wheels, 4 × 4
- Operational range: 700 km
- Maximum speed: 85 km/h

The Gazelle FRV or Fast Reconnaissance Vehicle was a 4×4 armoured fighting vehicle (AFV) demonstrator built for reconnaissance on the chassis of the Mercedes-Benz Unimog light truck developed by Zimbabwe in the early 1980s.

== Development ==
The FRV project begun in 1981–82 as a joint-venture by the private firm Kew Engineering Ltd of Gwelo (now Gweru) to meet a requirement from the Government of Zimbabwe for a home-built light armoured vehicle intended to the export market. After the prototype was completed, the new Zimbabwe Defence Industries (ZDI) demonstrated the Gazelle to the Kenyan Army, but no orders were ever placed and production did not proceed as expected. Although the prototype was also tested by the Zimbabwe National Army's (ZNA) 1st Mechanised Battalion in Mozambique, the ZNA never formally evaluated or adopted the vehicle and eventually the whole project was discontinued.

== General description ==
Built on a Mercedes-Benz U1100 Unimog 416 2.5 ton light truck chassis, it consisted of an armoured hull of welded ballistic steel plate incorporating one rear and two side doors. The overall design is very similar to the French ACMAT TPK 4.2 PSF armoured car, with exception of the glacis which had a small conventional windscreen on the right side and on the left side a projecting, box-type canopy of three framed windows of bullet- and splinter-proof glass to give the driver better lateral vision. This peculiar element of design was probably inspired by South African-made armoured vehicles such as the Buffel, which entered service with the South African Defence Force (SADF) at the time. The Gazelle had a five-man crew – driver, commander, gunner and two infantry scouts. Though a very fast and robust vehicle with a good off-road performance the Gazelle however, unlike most former Rhodesian and Zimbabwean armoured vehicles, lacked protection against landmines and had not for this single design flaw, it certainly would have been a commercial success. Is no longer being marketed.

=== Protection ===
The hull was made of ballistic 10mm mild steel plate; front windscreen and projecting canopy windows had 40mm bullet-proof laminated glass.

== Armament ==
A one-man turret similar to the Mine Protected Combat Vehicle (MPCV), which accommodated either 12.7mm or 14.5mm Heavy Machine-Guns (HMGs) could be fitted on the top roof though the vehicle also served without it and with other armament such as a pintle-mounted 20mm autocannon or a FN MAG-58 7.62×51mm NATO light machine-gun.

== See also ==
- Buffel
- Bullet TCV
- Hippo APC
- List of weapons of the Rhodesian Bush War
- Mine Protected Combat Vehicle
- Thyssen Henschel UR-416
