= Rhodesian Armoured Corps =

- The distinctive unit insignia of the Rhodesian Armoured Corps, featuring the Sable antelope which is prevalent on other Rhodesian symbols.
- Active: 1941–1956; 1972–1980
- Disbanded: 1980–1981
- Country: Rhodesia
- Allegiance: British Empire (1941–1956); Rhodesia (1972–1979); Zimbabwe Rhodesia (1979); Zimbabwe (1980)
- Branch: Rhodesian Army
- Type: Armoured cavalry
- Size: Battalion
- Garrison/HQ: Blakiston-Houston Barracks, Salisbury
- Nickname: "The Black Devils"
- Mottos: Asesabi Lutho (Sindebele for "We Fear Nothing")
- Cerise & Old Gold
- Armoured Cars: Eland; Ferret; Marmon Herrington; MPCV; Staghound
- Engagements: World War II: East African campaign; Battle of Monte Cassino; Spring 1945 offensive in Italy; Cold War: Aden Emergency; 1981 Entumbane Uprising; Rhodesian Bush War: Operation Eland; Operation Miracle

Commanders
- Commander (1972–1978): Major Bruce Rooken-Smith Rhodesian Army
- Commander (1978–1979): Major Darrell Winkler Rhodesian Army
- Commander (1979–1980): Major (SA) van Graan South African Army
- Commander (1980–1981): Lt. Col. Bruce Rooken-Smith Zimbabwe National Army

The Rhodesian Armoured Corps, nicknamed the "Black Devils" — was the only standing armoured cavalry battalion of the Rhodesian Army. During World War II, it took part in the Allied Spring 1945 offensive and the Battle of Monte Cassino as part of South Africa's 6th Armoured Division. The unit was among the first to enter a liberated Florence in July 1944. Prior to 1963, its crews were trained in the United Kingdom or Aden Colony and were known as the "Selous Scouts" under the Federation of Rhodesia and Nyasaland. After Rhodesia's Unilateral Declaration of Independence, maintaining the armoured vehicle fleet became a responsibility of the Rhodesian Light Infantry (RLI) until Major Bruce Rooken-Smith reactivated the former Rhodesian Armoured Car Regiment in 1972. During the Rhodesian Bush War, the regiment fought in several major campaigns and battles, particularly Operation Miracle in September 1979. It was superseded by the new Zimbabwe Armoured Corps between 1980 and 1981.

== History ==
=== World War II ===
Shortly after the outbreak of World War II, colonial authorities in Southern Rhodesia began looking to raise an armoured unit for the British Empire's ongoing war effort and established specialist training areas at Umtali accordingly. The resulting Southern Rhodesian Reconnaissance Unit was created in February 1941, and an intake of potential recruits from the Rhodesia Regiment accepted the following year. A stylised sable head was chosen as the unit symbol, along with the motto Ase Sabi Luto – "We fear nothing" – later adopted as Asesabi Lutho in the Sindebele language. In November 1942, the SRRU was formally renamed the "Southern Rhodesian Reconnaissance Regiment". For practical purposes, many Southern Rhodesian units were incorporated into the military formations of neighbouring South Africa, and the SRRU was attached to the South African 6th Armoured Division in November 1942.

The 6th Armoured arrived in Egypt in mid-1943, too late to participate in the recent Tunisia Campaign. Major General Evered Poole, the division commander, was free to focus on routine exercises, desert training, and integration of his Southern Rhodesian personnel. Despite being entitled to wear the flashes and insignia of the South African Army, most Rhodesians also opted to retain their regimental lapels. In Egypt, the SRRU received M4 Sherman tanks and the Rhodesian crews carried out exercises with the British III Corps from December 1943 to January 1944. In April 1944, the 6th Armoured was unexpectedly deployed to Italy to participate in the Italian Campaign. Elements of the SRRU were incorporated into the Pretoria Regiment and C Squadron, 1 Special Service Battalion in support of the I Canadian Corps along the Winter Line. On 3 June, the SRRU tank crews engaged the Wehrmacht for the first time near Paliano. Six days later, the South African and Rhodesian Shermans were involved in a particularly vicious battle against Tiger I tanks of the German 352nd Division.

In recognition of their close association and service with the British 24th Guards Brigade during the Italian Campaign, the regiment was permitted to wear the colours of the Brigade of Guards at a farewell parade in March 1945.

=== Interwar period ===
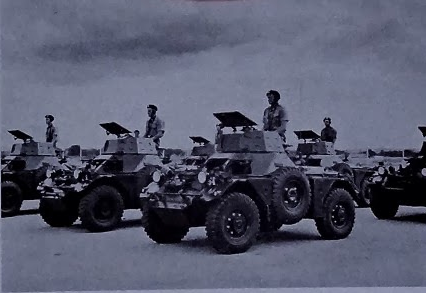
Ferret scout cars attached to A Squadron, 1963

After World War II, the SRRR was reorganised as an armoured car regiment equipped with T17E1 Staghound and Marmon Herrington armoured cars. It was renamed the Southern Rhodesian Armoured Car Regiment (SRACR) in December 1948. The regiment was led by Lieutenant Colonel C.V. King for much of the following decade, and although it continued to undergo periodic retraining sessions, it was largely inactive by the end of the 1950s. In 1961, the Federation of Rhodesia and Nyasaland initiated a thorough reorganisation of the armed forces, and the SRACR was incorporated into a single federal armoured car squadron. The SRACR shared a base with the RLI and was commanded by a Major P.F. Miller during this time. Due to the Congo Crisis in the neighbouring Democratic Republic of the Congo, the SRACR was briefly deployed to the Ndola for border security operations. During this period regimental colours in cerise and old gold were adopted, commemorating its longstanding affiliation with the 11th Hussars. At some point, the SRACR also received Ferret armoured cars to replace the ageing Marmon-Herrington.

In December 1963, the Federation of Rhodesia and Nyasaland was dissolved. The federal armoured squadron's assets were divided between Northern Rhodesia and Southern Rhodesia. Twenty-eight Ferrets were handed to Northern Rhodesia and later inherited by the new state of Zambia at independence. Ten Ferrets and twenty Staghounds were handed to Southern Rhodesia, which relegated them to storage.

The armoured cars spent two years in deep storage before 1 Reconnaissance Troop (1 RT), RLI, requested some Staghounds for "interest training". All the Staghounds had already been written off by the Southern Rhodesian government for scrap, but days prior to Ian Smith's Unilateral Declaration of Independence the notion was revisited and reconnaissance men summoned for training on the Staghounds. The RLI encountered severe difficulty in locating trained drivers – to say nothing of servicing their condemned vehicles, which had already been stripped of all salvageable crew equipment. Two were restored and driven under their own power to Kariba on 10 November 1965 to help counter possible incursions by Zambian troops. A few hours before UDI, Rhodesian troops began fortifying the local airstrip, intending to deny it by force to incoming Royal Air Force Javelins. It was decided to salute the occasion by firing a symbolic 37mm round towards Zambia. Twelve solid shot armour-piercing shells were drawn, six to each working Staghound. Only one car fired successfully, destroying its elderly breech protector in the process. Both were returned to the Rhodesian Army motor pool in early 1966 and did not see continued service.

=== Rhodesian Bush War ===
The unit's CO from inception to 1977 was Major Rooken Smith, and from 1978 was American Major Darrell Winkler. He was a field grade officer in the U.S. Army, who, after resignation went to South Africa first, and then towards Rhodesia. He was commissioned in the Rhodesian Army on 12 August 1977. The Rhodesian Armoured Corps then consisted of four squadrons, three of them were manned by territorials and only one squadron with a regular staff supplemented by National Servicemen.

An Armoured Depot was established at Blakiston-Houston Barracks which conducted all armour training and housed the Headquarters, Stores, Signals and Workshop detachments adjacent to King George VI Barracks (Army HQ) on the outskirts of Salisbury. Their vehicles consisted of the Rolls-Royce powered Ferret Scout Car, housing a 7.62mm Browning machine-gun in a small hatch-topped turret and the GM-powered Eland Armoured Car, the South African-produced version on the French Panhard AML-90, equipped with a 90mm cannon and a co-axial 7.62mm Browning machine-gun in a fully enclosed revolving turret. Later on the regiment received from South Africa eight captured T-55 main battle tanks, armed with a 100mm main cannon, a 7.62mm co-axial machine-gun and a 12.75mm anti aircraft gun.

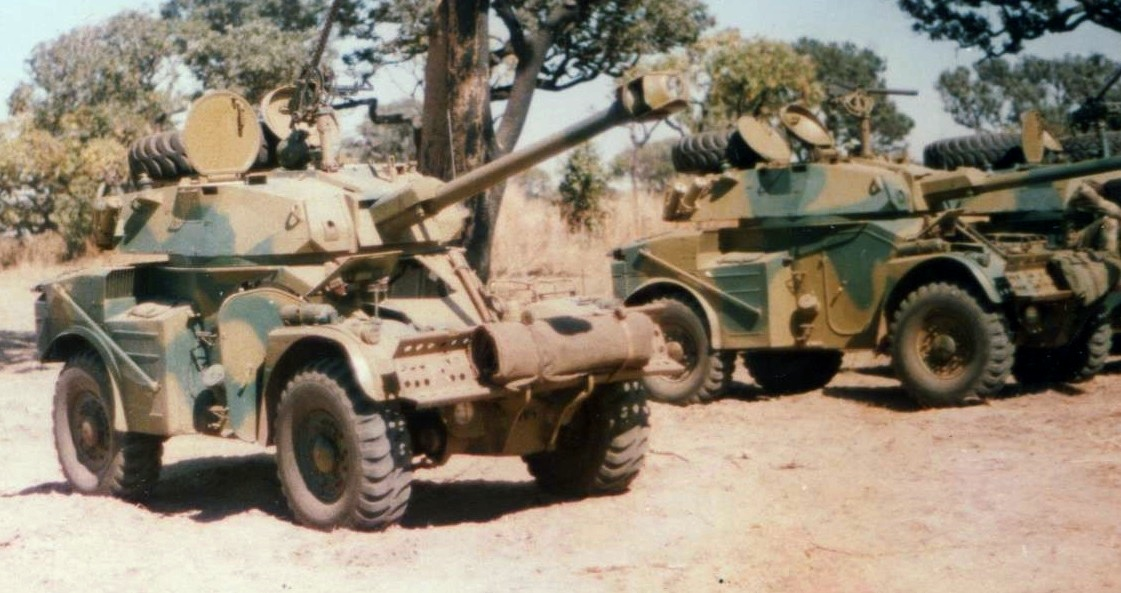
RhACR Eland-90s in the field.

They were fighting a counterinsurgency war for the most part but also continually trained for classical warfare in order to deal with enemies in neighbouring states who were equipped with T-34, T-55 and T-62 tanks, supported by Soviet, Red Chinese and Eastern European advisers. Heavy weapons deployed against the RhACR during border battles included 122mm rocket launchers, 75mm recoilless rifles and 82mm mortars. The TM46 anti-tank mine, often boosted, accounted for most of the regiment's casualties in the internal insurgency conflict.

The regiment took part in a number of static but intense battles, notably at Mount Selinda against the Mozambican Army (where a Bronze Cross was awarded to 2nd Lieutenant Rae) in 1977 and at Chirundu in October 1978, where heavy-machine gun, artillery and mortar duels took place between D Squadron and elements of the Zambian Army over a period of three days and nights near the Otto Beit Bridge. Elements of the Rhodesian Defence Regiment (RDR) were also involved at close quarters at the bridge, while Rhodesia Regiment (RR) provided 81mm mortar and 106mm recoilless rifle fire support.

In July 1977 D Squadron engaged a large group of ZANLA guerrillas north of Vila Salazar, while they were attempting to cross the border into Rhodesia, and it was reported that 37 enemy were killed in that engagement with some accounted for at point-blank range. In these battles the Eland and its devastating 90mm round were decisive in the outcome. Nobody was hurt on the Rhodesian side in any of these engagements. Casualties in the regiment were among the lowest in the army because the guerrilla enemy avoided contact as far as possible.

In April 1979, at Hippo Creek north west of Victoria Falls, two vehicles from troop Tango 22, D Squadron engaged a group of ZIPRA guerrillas attempting a night-time crossing of the border into Rhodesia. Enemy forces covering the crossing, and others waiting to cross, returned fire with mortars, armour piercing 14.5’s and small arms. Despite the initial contact lasting less than two minutes, the crossing was foiled, and in excess of 40 enemy bodies were subsequently recovered in mop-up operations on the Rhodesian side of the river in Hippo Creek. Subsequent intel has confirmed that between T22’s return fire and the artillery and mortar fire missions called in by the vehicle commander, 2nd Lieutenant Erasmus, a further 90 plus ZIPRA Guerrillas from Zebra Battalion were accounted for on the Zambian side of the river. This engagement was described by Colonel Ron Reid-Daly, in his book Top Secret War, as the most successful, wholly land based, contact of the bush war. No Rhodesian casualties were sustained in this engagement.

In the late 1970s when the Rhodesian Bush War was entering its final phase, the Rhodesian Security Forces (RhSF) were faced with an escalation towards conventional warfare when they learned that a mechanised built-up was being undertaken by the Zimbabwe People's Revolutionary Army (ZIPRA) guerrilla organization based in neighbouring Zambia with material assistance from the Soviet Union. Eventually, by mid-1979 ZIPRA had brought to strength a fairly sizeable armoured corps trained by Cuban advisors, which aligned five BRDM-2 reconnaissance armoured cars, six to ten T-34/85 tanks and fifteen BTR-152 wheeled APCs.

To deal with the potential threat of a possible conventional ground invasion from across the border, the Rhodesian Armoured Car Regiment (RhACR) was reorganized in 1978, being expanded to include additional tank and mechanized infantry squadrons.

=== Adoption of T-55 tanks ===
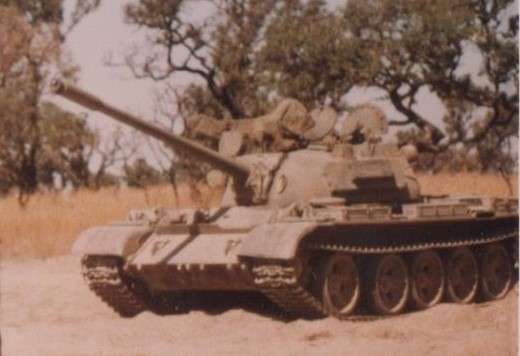
Rhodesian T-55 tank parked at Inkomo Barracks, 1979.

In October 1979, South African port authorities boarded and seized a French freighter, the Astor, believed to be carrying a shipment of weaponry bound for Angola. The Astor had initially been chartered by the Libyan government with the delivery of arms, primarily ten T-55LD tanks of Polish origin from Tripoli's surplus stocks, to Uganda. The tanks, including assorted ammunition and spare parts, were to be offloaded at Mombasa, Kenya, and from thence transported overland. By October the Astor's crew had already rounded the Cape of Good Hope but received belated news of Uganda's defeat in the Uganda–Tanzania War, and new orders to reroute their cargo to an unknown Angolan port. The freighter abruptly changed course; upon its unexpected return to South African waters which aroused suspicion, the Astor was impounded in Durban.

South Africa confiscated all ten T-55s under the pretext that she was effectively at war with Angola at the time, retaining two for evaluation purposes. The remaining eight were offered as aid to the Rhodesian Army, which assigned them to a newly raised "E" Squadron, Rhodesian Armoured Corps. It was intentionally leaked to the press that the tanks had been captured in Mozambique. For several months the T-55s were driven around the country on transporters, giving the impression that Rhodesia possessed a much larger number. Personnel assigned to "E" Squadron were trained by South African tank crews, who also modified each T-55 with an improved communications system adopted from the Eland Mk7 and refinished with anti-infrared paint. Radios were eventually removed from the loader's position and reinstalled near the vehicle commander.

The first intake of T-55 crews were recruited only from Rhodesian Army regulars and assigned to a Bundeswehr veteran, Captain Rolf Kaufeld, who was well versed in tank warfare. Despite their deployment in anticipation of potential ceasefire violations during Rhodesia's general elections in 1980, the tanks remained untested in combat.

== Structure ==
Patterned after its British and South African counterparts, the Rhodesian Armoured Corps was generally organised along NATO lines. There were five squadrons (companies); each squadron had four troops – including attached signals, training, maintenance, and headquarters personnel. In 1979, a fifth troop – support infantry – was added. Due to the size of the Rhodesian Army and its reserve-dependent status, three of the squadrons were manned by reservists and only active for incremental periods. The fourth squadron was permanently staffed by a rotating cadre of regular officers and national servicemen.

All squadrons could muster over 300 members for active duty. At one time, RhACR's ranks swelled to 500 troops in five squadrons, including 60 South African-built Eland armoured cars, 50 unlicensed copies of German UR-416 personnel carriers, 20 British-built Daimler Ferret scout cars, and an array of locally produced improvised fighting vehicles. After 1979 the inventory included the 8 Polish-built Soviet T-55LD tanks mentioned above.

In the 1960s preeminent armoured vehicle of the period was the Ferret, a pre-independence contribution from the British Forces Aden. Although 30 Ferrets had once been maintained by the Southern Rhodesian Armoured Regiment some of these were passed on to other successor states after the breakup of the Federation. The Rhodesian Light Infantry received 10 examples in varying states of disrepair and was forced to restore them. Even American-made T17E1 Staghounds of World War II vintage were saved from pending scrapping, and employed as fixed installations when no longer reliably mobile.

RhACR's stratagems reflected the regiment's experience on Humber and Marmon-Herrington armoured cars during the North Africa Campaign, as well as the training many Rhodesian crews had received from their British instructors during the Aden Emergency. However, as the Rhodesian Bush War intensified, Salisbury adopted elements of Israeli mechanised doctrine – particularly those which emphasised light cavalry movements behind enemy lines. RhACR tactics came to revolve around mobility, speed, and swift aggression.

Although maligned by age and further deteriorating as a result of hard use and the difficulty in obtaining spares from the United Kingdom, Ferrets continued to be employed for counter-insurgency operations and protective duties. Equipped with a single heavy machine gun, Browning medium machine guns, or a 20mm Hispano-Suiza HS.820 anti-aircraft gun, they were retrofitted with new motors and larger fuel tanks. RhACR units also used MAP-45 and MAP-75 armoured personnel carriers, which, although lightly armed and armoured, provided excellent protection for their embarked infantry sections against land mines. Local manufacturers either converted an older chassis into a MAP or created an entirely new one, installing engines stripped from a menagerie of imported commercial vehicles.

In 1976 rumours of T-34 and T-54 tanks in neighbouring Mozambique – where the Rhodesian security forces were increasingly being drawn into external operations against Robert Mugabe's Zimbabwe African National Liberation Army (ZANLA), caused a stir, prompting the formation of tank-killer teams. Infantrymen were trained in the use of ageing M20 bazookas while the artillery corps rigged M40 recoilless rifles to Unimog trucks for engaging heavy armour. The Unimog crews worked in pairs to counter the likelihood of retaliatory fire, due in part to the M40's backblast which served to highlight the gunner's position. As the Ferret's firepower was limited, Eland Mk4 armoured cars were also imported in quantity. A South African variant of the French Panhard AML, the Eland was frequently utilised for fire support and anti-tank duties. It was armed with a 90mm cannon capable of destroying a T-34 at medium range, enabling the smaller armoured cars to punch well above their weight during conventional engagements.

The Rhodesians favoured wheeled, lightly protected, vehicles like the Ferret, Eland, and MAP series of personnel carriers because of their operational range and simplicity. Nearly all the RhACR's support vehicles deployed during the war shared these characteristics, including the ubiquitous Mine Protected Combat Vehicle. The limited exception were Rhodesia's T-55s, which were never deployed operationally. After 1976 insurgent and allied forces in Zambia and Mozambique fielded T-54/55 and T-34 MBTs, BRDM-1 and BRDM-2 reconnaissance vehicles, and BTR-152 and BTR-60 APCs. These often boasted heavier armour, more lethal main armament, better armour-piercing ammunition, and better fire control than the Eland and other assorted vehicles pressed into anti-tank duty by the regiment. RhACR recognised this threat by restructuring itself for conventional warfare accordingly and joining with the Rhodesian African Rifles in 1980 to create its first combined arms battalion.

== Orders of dress ==
The regiment was allegedly given the nickname 'The Black Devils' by the insurgents, reflecting the black tank-suits and leather jackets worn by some of the more highly spirited D Squadron members. These were introduced by Darryl Winkler in an effort to engender an esprit de corps within his squadron – and echoed the all-black look of the British Royal Tank Regiment.

In the operational area the majority of the soldiers of the regiment wore one-piece tank uniforms and peaked field caps with neck flaps. On base, standard Rhodesian camouflage was worn with a black beret, fitted with the sable badge illustrated on this page. 'T' Troop wore the Corps of Signals badge. The fitter section wore the Army Service Corps badge. All badges were underpinned by the Cerise and Old Gold regimental colours on an enameled plaque. The stable belt's colours were, according to former commanding officer Lt Col Rooken-Smith: "Cerise and Old Gold, to mark the affiliation with [the British Army] 11th hussars, hence [also] the brooch below [the beret] badge".

== See also ==
- Rhodesian Bush War
- Rhodesian Security Forces
