= Hippo APC =

South African armoured personnel carrier

Hippo
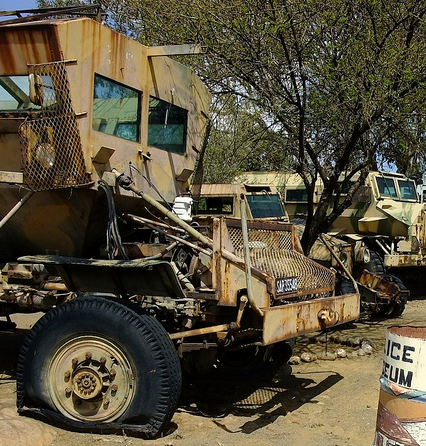
- Armscor Hippo at the SAPS Museum, Ventersburg
- Type: Armoured personnel carrier
- Place of origin: South Africa

Service history
- In service: 1974 - 1978
- Used by: See Operators
- Wars: Rhodesian Bush War; South African Border War

Production history
- Designer: Armscor South Africa
- Designed: 1974
- Manufacturer: Armscor South Africa
- No. built: 275 (Mk 1-R) 402 (Mk 1-M)
- Variants: See Variants

Specifications
- Mass: 8.8 tonnes (9.7 short tons; 8.7 long tons)
- Length: 6.53 m (21 ft 5 in)
- Width: 2.46 m (8 ft 1 in)
- Height: 3.3 m (10 ft 10 in)
- Crew: 2
- Passengers: 10
- Main armament: 2x 7.62mm M1919 Browning machine guns
- Engine: Bedford 2.5 L (150 in^{3}) inline 6-cylinder water-cooled petrol
- Transmission: ZF 4-speed manual synchromesh (2nd, 3rd, 4th gears)
- Ground clearance: 32 cm
- Fuel capacity: 240 litres
- Operational range: 640 km
- Maximum speed: 73 km/h

The Hippo was a South African armoured personnel carrier. Specially designed to be mine resistant, it can carry ten infantrymen and a crew of two. The vehicle's remote-operated turret mounts dual 7.62mm machine guns, but like other improvised fighting vehicles, it is only lightly protected against ballistic threats.

== Development history ==
An interim solution adopted to deal with the threat of land mines deployed by the South West African People's Organization (SWAPO) in northern Ovamboland, the Hippo was simply a blastproof hull fitted to a Bedford RL chassis. Similar to the BTR-152, it offered a staggered troop compartment with seating facing inwards. Vision was restricted to narrow plate glass windows. This layout was universally unpopular and later corrected with the Buffel. There were firing ports for the occupants and a powered machine gun turret could be braced on the open top, though these were seldom fitted. Passengers and crew debussed from a rear deck.

The Hippo Mk1-R was based on a M1961 Bedford truck chassis, which was being phased from South African service in 1974. The Mk1-R was manufactured using mild steel and RB390 armour steel. Some 150 Mk1-R were ordered and shipped to the South African Police in 1974, another 5 being donated to the South-West African authorities. Police units left behind several when they withdrew from Rhodesia in 1976; these were retained by the Rhodesian Security Forces and later passed on to the Zimbabwe National Army. In 1978, 120 Hippo Mk1-R conversions of M1970 Bedfords was undertaken for the South African Defence Force, which had assumed responsibility for patrols along the Angolan border and needed a new mine protected vehicle. The Hippo Mk1-M used ROQ TUFF steel instead of mild steel. The South African Army ordered 402 Mk1-M.

The Hippo served its purpose for the South African Army but it was heavy, and lacked true off-road capability. A new mine-protected vehicle had been designed in April 1976 although it would be another two years before the Buffel would eventually replace the Hippo as the Army's premier troop-carrying mine-protected vehicle.

== Variants ==
- Hippo Mk1-R - 1974 model, built on the 1961 Bedford chassis.
- Hippo Mk1-M - 1978 model, built on the 1970 Bedford chassis.

== Operators ==
- South Africa: South African Defence Force and South African Police
- (South Africa) South-West Africa: South West African Police
- Rhodesia: Rhodesian Security Forces
- Zimbabwe: Zimbabwe National Army (ZNA)

== In popular culture ==
The Hippo made some appearances in television and film productions shot in Zimbabwe and set in the Apartheid era of the 1970s-1980s. In one such production, the British 1987 epic apartheid drama film Cry Freedom, ZNA Hippos appear on several scenes portraying South African Defence Force (SADF) and South African Police (SAP) armoured vehicles.

== See also ==
- Buffel
- Bullet TCV
- Casspir
- Crocodile Armoured Personnel Carrier
- Gazelle FRV
- List of weapons of the Rhodesian Bush War
- MAP45 Armoured Personnel Carrier
- MAP75 Armoured Personnel Carrier
- Mine Protected Combat Vehicle (MPCV)
