= 1981 Entumbane uprising =

Battle of Bulawayo, Zimbabwe

- Part of the aftermath of the Rhodesian Bush War
Date	8 – 12 February 1981 (4 days)
Location	Bulawayo, Zimbabwe
Result	Government victory

Belligerents
Zimbabwe	ZIPRA elements	ZANLA elements

Commanders and leaders
(Zimbabwe) Mike Shute; (Zimbabwe) Mick McKenna; (Zimbabwe) Lionel Dyck	Unknown	Unknown

Strength
About 500	About 1,500 guerrillas	1,500 – 2,000 guerrillas

Casualties and losses
None reported	Unknown	Unknown
- Official death count 260; historians estimate over 300 or over 400 killed

The 1981 Entumbane uprising, also known as the Battle of Bulawayo or Entumbane II, occurred between 8 and 12 February 1981 in and around Bulawayo, Zimbabwe amid political tensions in the newly independent state. Zimbabwe People's Revolutionary Army (ZIPRA) guerrillas, mainly in the city's western suburb of Entumbane, rebelled, creating a situation that threatened to develop into a fresh civil war, barely a year after the end of the Bush War. The Rhodesian African Rifles (RAR) and other white-commanded elements of the former Rhodesian Security Forces, fighting for the Zimbabwean government as part of the new Zimbabwe National Army, put down the uprising. Groups of Zimbabwe African National Liberation Army (ZANLA) fighters attacked both ZIPRA and the government forces during the revolt, which followed a smaller outbreak of fighting between guerrillas in November 1980.

The uprising began in earnest around 20:00 local time (CAT) on 11 February when fighting broke out between the two guerrilla factions in Entumbane, each of which also attacked the local RAR headquarters. When ZIPRA armoured personnel carriers moved on Bulawayo from Essexvale, to the south-east, four armoured cars from the former Rhodesian Armoured Corps, supported by A Company, 1RAR, engaged and defeated them. Meanwhile, C and D Companies, 1RAR were pocketed by numerically superior groups of ZIPRA fighters. By the evening of 12 February, the uprising was over; C and D Companies were relieved, ZIPRA ceased their attacks and their armoured battle group at Essexvale surrendered to the National Army.

The official count of those killed during the uprising was 260 people; historians place the number of dead higher. The Zimbabwe National Army suffered no fatal casualties. Binda calls the battle the RAR's greatest victory, writing that the troops were greatly outnumbered, but won through superior professionalism and discipline. Several analysts comment on the irony that Mugabe and ZANU–PF were saved from a major rebellion by white-led ex-Rhodesian troops. The battle was the RAR's last; its personnel were reassigned to other units when it was disbanded later in 1981. The rebellion's defeat, meanwhile, prompted mass desertions by ZIPRA guerrillas fearing retribution from the Mugabe administration. Indeed, the uprising partially fuelled Mugabe's bloody Gukurahundi campaign against Matabeleland later in the 1980s.

== Background ==
=== Chimurenga/Umvukela ===
Zimbabwe, highlighted in red on a map of Africa

Following the Unilateral Declaration of Independence by the mostly white minority government of Rhodesia (or Southern Rhodesia) from the United Kingdom in 1965, the southern African country entered a period of international isolation as an unrecognised state under Ian Smith. Black nationalist movements, backed by communist powers and themselves variously Marxist–Leninist, launched military campaigns to overthrow Rhodesia's Government and bring majority rule to the country; the main nationalist groups were the Zimbabwe African National Union (ZANU), which was Chinese-backed, mostly Shona and influenced by Maoism, and the rival Zimbabwe African People's Union (ZAPU), which was largely Ndebele, more orthodoxly Marxist–Leninist and supported by the Warsaw Pact and associated nations, prominently Cuba. Each nationalist group fielded a guerrilla army—ZANU's was called the Zimbabwe African National Liberation Army (ZANLA), while ZAPU's was the Zimbabwe People's Revolutionary Army (ZIPRA). ZAPU was led by Joshua Nkomo, a trade unionist from Bulawayo in Matabeleland, while ZANU was headed from 1975 by a former teacher from Mashonaland, Robert Mugabe after the assassination of H Chitepo.

The black nationalist campaigns, referred to by the revolutionaries as the Second Umvukela /Chimurenga (liberation war), began in earnest in December 1972. During the ensuing Bush War, ZANLA and ZIPRA fought the Rhodesian Security Forces, and also regularly clashed with each other, despite their parent organisations being superficially allied from 1976 as the Patriotic Front. The war ended in December 1979 with the Lancaster House Agreement in London, following which Britain took interim direct control of the country to oversee fresh elections during early 1980. These were won by ZANU, which added "Patriotic Front" to its name (thereby becoming "ZANU–PF"), and Mugabe became the first Prime Minister of Zimbabwe when the UK granted independence in April 1980. Nkomo was made Minister of Home Affairs in the new Government.

=== Post-independence tensions ===
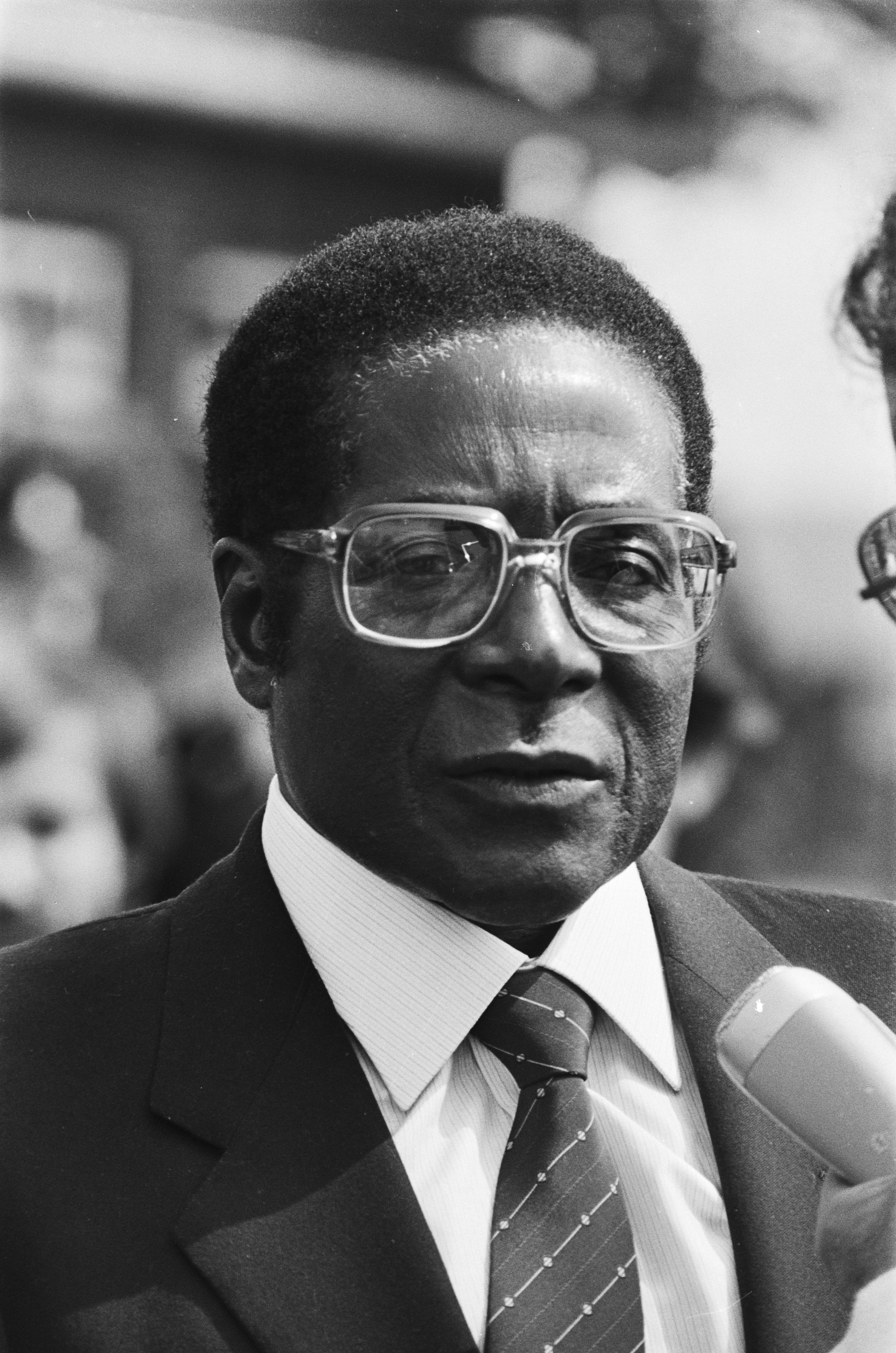
Prime Minister Robert Mugabe in 1982

With the transfer of political power, the Rhodesian Army, ZANLA and ZIPRA began to be merged to form the new Zimbabwe National Army. ZANLA and ZIPRA personnel were mixed into new battalions, guerrillas were picked out for officer training, and old Rhodesian units were variously disbanded or earmarked for reform. In some cases the latter meant only a change of symbolism and nomenclature; the Rhodesian Air Force, for example, remained almost all white as the Air Force of Zimbabwe. Every one of the approximately 34,000 guerrillas was promised a place in the new army. In the meantime they would wait in respective ZANLA and ZIPRA assembly camps around the country with pay and rations identical to those of black privates in the old Rhodesian forces.

Though the Chimurenga was over, tensions between ZANLA and ZIPRA cadres, officially referred to in the war's aftermath as "associated forces", endured, particularly in Matabeleland. These rifts were partially tribal-based, but largely political; ZIPRA fighters complained that their counterparts from ZANLA seemed to be favoured for promotions and supplies, while ZANLA suspected ZIPRA of plotting insurrection. ZANU–PF politicians began to call for a one-party state, saying that this would make Zimbabwe stronger. As the process of military integration dragged on, groups of fighters from both forces deserted and roamed the countryside, robbing stores and killing white farmers. Sources differ regarding how much of this was perpetrated by ZANLA personnel and how much by ZIPRA men; each side blamed the other. Mugabe accused ZIPRA elements of "refusing to recognise the sovereignty of the Government", but stopped short of attacking the ZAPU leadership. With the new army's ex-guerrilla battalions still far from ready, the Zimbabwean Government leaned heavily on former Rhodesian units under white command to maintain law and order during this period. Feeling he needed to secure ZANU–PF's position, Mugabe signed a secret deal with North Korea in October 1980 whereby the Asian country would provide instructors and equipment for an elite brigade that would handle political dissidents and report directly to the Prime Minister.

After the Minister of Finance Enos Nkala railed against Nkomo and ZAPU at a Bulawayo political rally in November 1980, saying they had "become the enemy of ZANU–PF" and should be challenged by "vigilante committees", ZANLA and ZIPRA veterans clashed near the city's western township of Entumbane for two days. Hundreds were killed or wounded before the Prime Minister sent ex-Rhodesian units to intervene. This incident deepened the feeling of distrust and unease that permeated the country and the National Army's integrated battalions. Concerned by ZAPU's apparent political marginalisation, ZIPRA commanders in Matabeleland built up their forces. Over 6,000 ZIPRA troops assembled at Gwaai River Mine, to the north-west of Bulawayo, with Soviet-made T-34 tanks, BTR-152 armoured personnel carriers (APCs) and anti-aircraft guns; another ZIPRA base at Essexvale, to the south-east, formed an armoured battle group including 10 T-34s. Tensions escalated further when Mugabe removed Nkomo from Home Affairs on 10 January 1981 and made him a minister without portfolio instead, in what many in Zimbabwe saw as a demotion. According to Brigadier Mike Shute, then head of the Zimbabwe National Army's 1 Brigade, groups of ZANLA and ZIPRA guerrillas, theoretically under his command, were soon "all over the place and having continual clashes and minor battles with each other". Many became convinced that a second civil war was imminent.

== Prelude ==
Map of Zimbabwe in 1981, showing locations relevant to the uprising with
new place names (adopted in 1982) in parentheses

The Zimbabwe National Army's only regular infantry unit in the Bulawayo area during the first months of 1981 was the 1st Battalion of the Rhodesian African Rifles (RAR), a regiment of mostly white-officered black troops led by Lieutenant-Colonel Mick McKenna and based at Methuen Barracks on the outskirts of Bulawayo. This had been officially redesignated the 11th Infantry Battalion of the new National Army, but few reforms had taken place so far and in practice the regiment remained almost entirely as before, right down to the old Rhodesian uniforms and insignia. At the end of January 1981, McKenna had about 500 men (including officers), and a troop of four Eland 90 armoured cars, formerly of the Rhodesian Armoured Corps, under Sergeant Stephen "Skippy" Devine, an Australian veteran of the Rhodesian Light Infantry.

Amid the rising tensions in Zimbabwe, Shute and McKenna identified Entumbane, the township on the western outskirts of Bulawayo where the November 1980 clashes had started, as a likely flashpoint. There ZANLA and ZIPRA had camps directly next to each other, each with about 1,500 guerrillas. In late January 1981, McKenna set up an operational headquarters in a beer hall overlooking the two guerrilla camps; this building, surrounded by six-foot walls, was dubbed "the Alamo" at the suggestion of Lieutenant F W "Chomps" Fleetwood, an American officer in A Company, 1RAR. Worried that a new Entumbane clash would prompt the ZIPRA forces at Gwaai River Mine and Essexvale to join the fray, McKenna set up a string of observation posts on each of the roads leading towards Bulawayo.

On 8 February, ZANLA cadres at Connemara Barracks in Gwelo surprised their ZIPRA counterparts, killed over 60 of them and forced the rest to flee into the bush. When the ZIPRA portion of the 13th Infantry Battalion, based at Glenville Camp near Entumbane, learned of this later in the day, it waited until its instructors from the British Army left in the evening, then attacked its ZANLA comrades, killing 12 of them and scattering the rest. Charged with restoring order, McKenna sent Devine's armoured cars and D Company, 1RAR, commanded by the American Lieutenant Dave Hill, to Glenville. Arriving late in the evening, the Elands drove into the camp and flattened the ZIPRA tents, killing many of the occupants and clearing the way for Hill's troops. Taken totally by surprise, the ZIPRA troops put up little resistance; 40 were killed and many more captured, including two officers, Captains Mpofu and Dlamini. On the morning of 9 February, the British instructors were bewildered to find the ZANLA half of their unit gone, and the remaining ZIPRA men squatting in rows in 1RAR captivity. "What happened?" asked a British sergeant. "I am afraid that while you were away, your battalion fell apart," replied McKenna.

ZIPRA personnel in Bulawayo used civilian vehicles to smuggle weapons and equipment, including mortars, into their Entumbane camp over the next few days. C Company, 1RAR, comprising 96 men under Major Lionel Dyck (including a detachment from Support Company) and eight armoured vehicles, noticed this while they were garrisoning the Alamo on 11 February. The major reported to Brigade headquarters that the number of ZIPRA troops at Entumbane appeared to have swelled considerably, and that the chain link fence surrounding the camp had been taken down. Superiors ordered him not to intervene. Anticipating an imminent attack, Dyck used a silenced rifle to shoot out the floodlights surrounding the Alamo, lined up his vehicles against the surrounding walls so his men could stand on them while defending, and ranged mortars on a variety of targets in the ZIPRA complex.

== Uprising ==
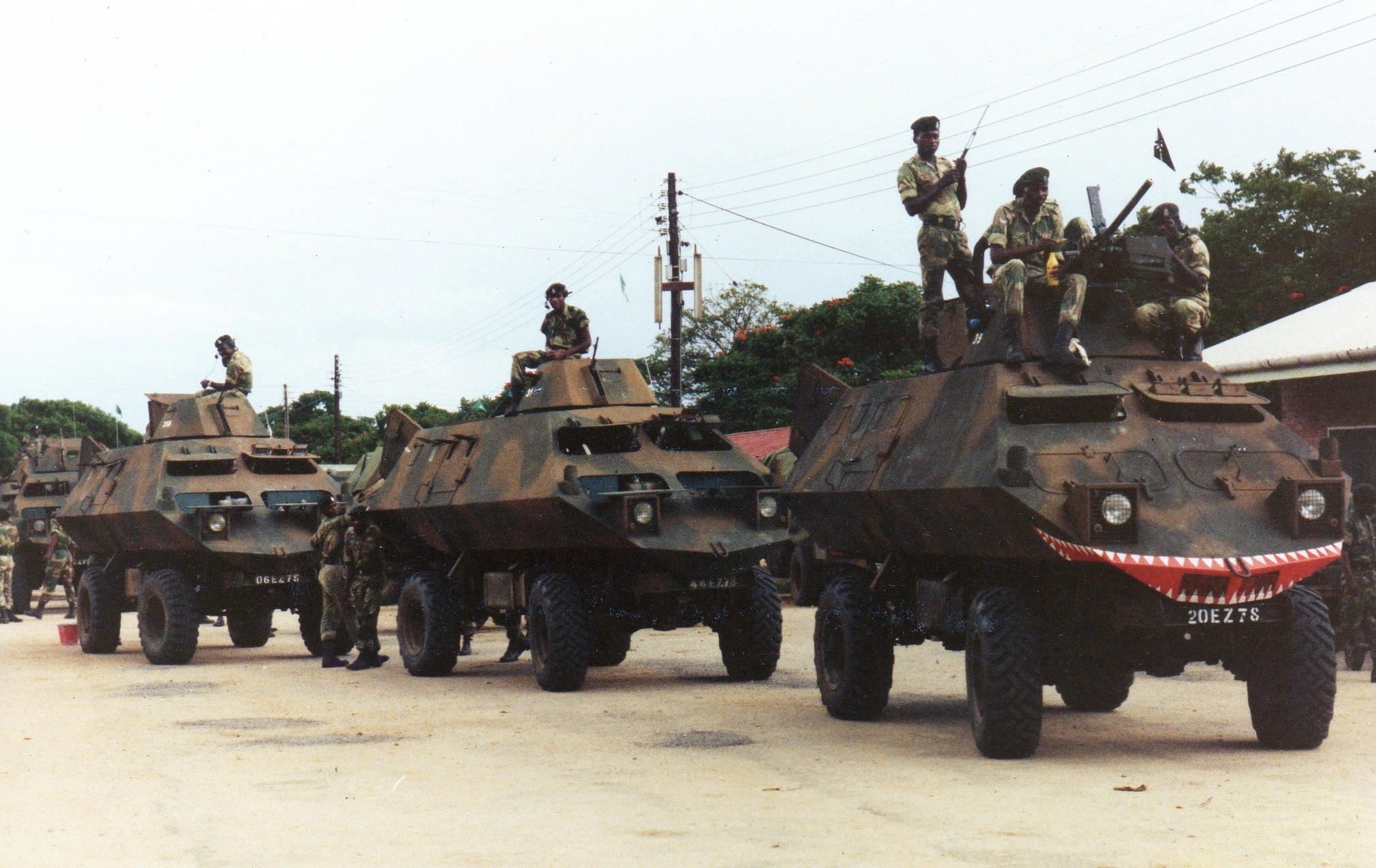
1RAR troops atop Mine Protected Combat Vehicle (MPCV) vehicles before Entumbane

Soon after fighting broke out between ZANLA and ZIPRA members of a recently integrated Zimbabwe National Army battalion at Ntabazinduna, just north-east of Bulawayo, the two guerrilla camps at Entumbane began exchanging rifle, machine gun and mortar fire at about 20:00 (CAT) on 11 February. Dyck, at the Alamo, reported that both sides were also attacking his position. He radioed Brigade HQ for instructions and was told to pull out; he replied that this was impossible as he was surrounded. At Shute's orders, McKenna mobilised the rest of the battalion at an airfield near Brady Barracks within an hour. Meanwhile, a detachment of ZIPRA armoured vehicles left Essexvale for Bulawayo, and was spotted on the road by one of McKenna's observation posts. Devine was sent with his Elands to intercept them, supported by 12 1RAR men under Major Tony Husher. At an intersection on the outskirts of the city, Devine encountered a ZIPRA BTR-152 APC and hit it with one high-explosive anti-tank (HEAT) round, killing all 20 combatants inside. McKenna then told Devine to advance to the city limits, where he and Husher set up an ambush on the road. Husher's men shot out all nearby overhead street lights, and some of them went to scout ahead; Devine positioned two of his Elands on each of the two lanes of the road under cover of darkness.

Meanwhile, at Entumbane, the ZIPRA fighters overran the ZANLA camp, killing many and forcing the rest to flee. Sporadic fighting between ZANLA and ZIPRA guerrillas spread into Bulawayo itself, continuing through the night and into the morning. About 700 ZIPRA combatants continued to attack C Company's position at the Alamo, putting it under constant machine gun and mortar fire. Pocketed, Dyck responded in kind. About 02:00 (CAT) on 12 February, a ZIPRA guerrilla with an RPD machine gun took up a position in a house to the Alamo's south-east and "became a nuisance", as the major put it; he and Sergeant Vini Hlatshwayo went out with an RPG-7 rocket launcher and fired at the corner of the house, bringing it down on the gunner and killing him.

On the road, two ZIPRA BTR-152s from Essexvale advanced towards Bulawayo, firing indiscriminately in all directions, and were spotted by Devine around 01:30 (CAT). The Elands waited in the darkness until the ZIPRA vehicles were about 200 metres (660 ft) away, then fired. Both APCs were directly hit and most of the men inside killed; the survivors ran off into the night. Fleetwood then arrived at the head of a 1RAR platoon to support Devine and Husher. Around the same time, men of A Company, 1RAR captured a ZIPRA commander who was trying to enter Bulawayo through a back road in a Peugeot station wagon, and 3 Platoon, A Company captured six ZIPRA officers driving into town on the Essexvale Road in a Toyota Land Cruiser. McKenna ordered Hill and D Company to help Dyck by taking up a position between the city and Entumbane. A group of ZIPRA unsuccessfully attacked D Company as it moved west to high ground at Lurkers' Ridge, just south-east of the Alamo. B Company, meanwhile, took up positions on the railway line just north-east of Lurkers' Ridge. McKenna told Dyck over the radio that reinforcements would come and to "hang in there".

By about 05:00 (CAT), Dyck's ammunition supplies were running low, and the ZIPRA attackers had hit the Alamo a number of times with RPG fire. Nobody inside was killed by these rockets, but when Dyck's dog was wounded, the major flew into a rage and ordered his men to pour more aggressive machine gun fire on the advancing ZIPRA combatants. He requested air support from Brigade HQ in the form of a Lynx light bomber. The air force turned down the request, but Flight Lieutenant Colin James took off anyway in his Lynx armed with an FN MAG machine gun and SNEB rockets. The ZIPRA cadres concentrated a huge amount of fire on James' aircraft, and hit it several times, but failed to shoot it down; the pilot put in a number of ground attacks before returning to base. He reported afterwards that a bullet had entered through the floor of his cockpit and hit his helmet. The 1RAR officers and men expressed great admiration for James's bravery during this air strike, but his air force superiors were furious that he had gone into the operational area against orders.

A National Army relief column including the detachments under Husher, Fleetwood and Devine assembled at Lurkers' Ridge during the morning of 12 February. Under the command of Captain Tony Clark, it flanked through the townships south of the Alamo, engaging ZIPRA guerrillas along the way, then turned north to relieve Dyck. The Elands led the way, with Devine himself standing upright in the turret of one of them with a machine gun. At one point this was shot out of his hands, prompting him to briefly stop the advance so he could jump down into the street to collect it. By the time the relief column reached the Alamo at 13:00 (CAT), C Company had been pocketed for 16 hours. Four wounded 1RAR soldiers were evacuated, and Dyck left the building to point out targets for Devine's armoured cars. During the afternoon, A Company relieved D Company at Lurker's Ridge, and the ZANLA and ZIPRA guerrillas withdrew into the townships and the surrounding country, sporadically exchanging fire. Devine was sent to Essexvale to engage the rest of ZIPRA's armoured battle group, which surrendered when he arrived; the T-34 tanks were later found by the Zimbabwe National Army to be nonfunctional. By the evening of 12 February, the rebellion was over.

== Aftermath ==
Hundreds of people died in the uprising. The official count released at the time was 260, but historians place the number higher; Martin Meredith records "more than 300" dead, while Alexandre Binda writes that the Zimbabwe National Army units alone killed over 400 guerrillas. The Zimbabwe National Army officially reported no fatal casualties. Hill and Husher were each awarded the Bronze Cross of Zimbabwe for their part in putting down the rebellion, while Dyck received the Silver Cross. In his history of the Rhodesian African Rifles, Binda describes Entumbane as the regiment's greatest victory, commenting that it was won "by dint of professionalism, discipline and determination" in the face of forces that were far larger numerically. Major Michael P Stewart of the United States Army writes that 1RAR's actions at Entumbane "saved Mugabe's Government from certain civil war", and provided the "final blow to the military might of ZIPRA". A number of analysts comment on the irony that Mugabe and ZANU–PF, who had spent years fighting white rule and the Rhodesian forces during the 1970s, were secured in power barely a year after the Bush War's end by ex-Rhodesian troops under white command. Binda furthermore highlights the irony that the RAR's finest hour (in his view) came while fighting for Mugabe.

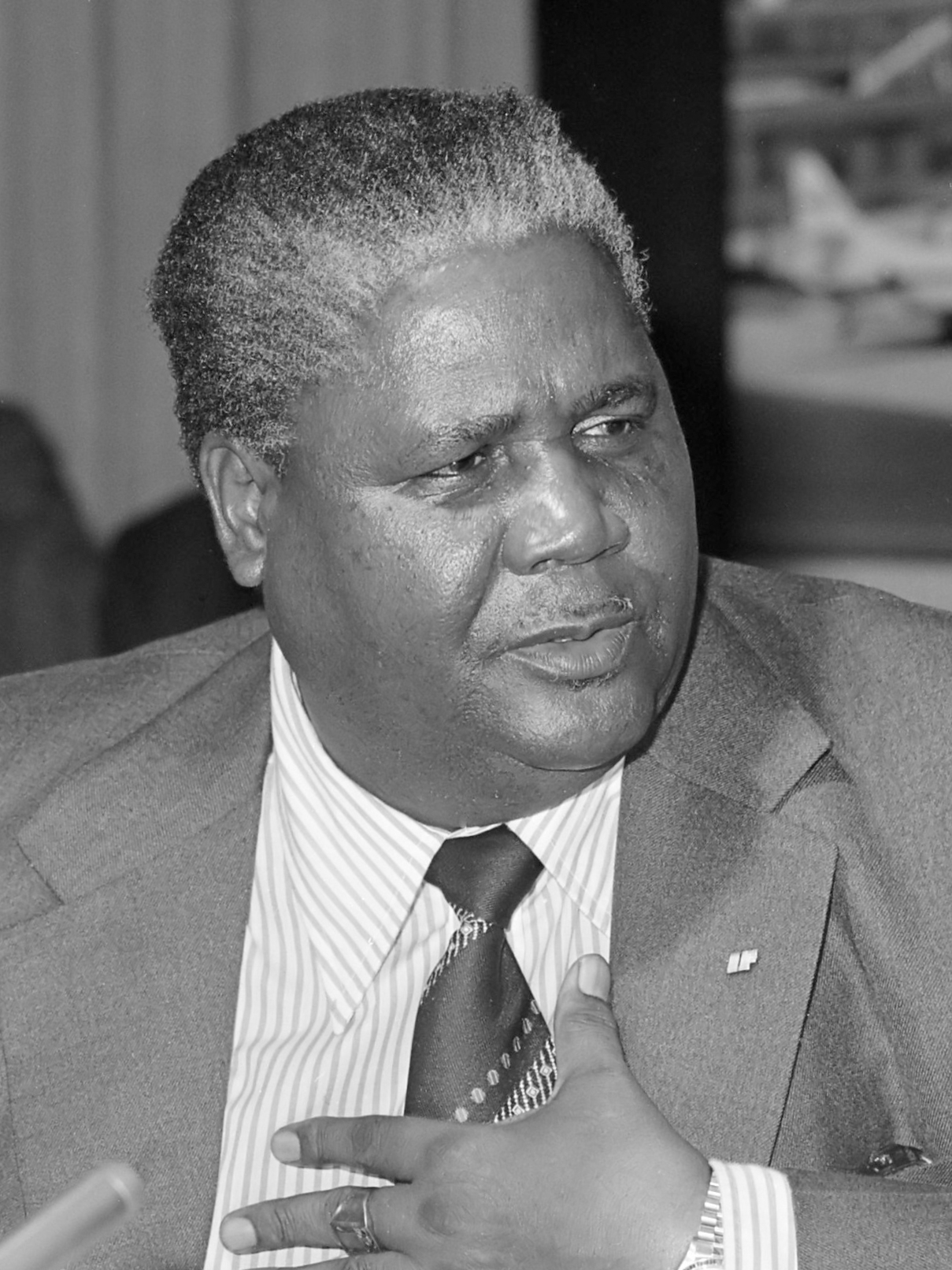
Joshua Nkomo, ZAPU's leader, in 1978

Mugabe said that undisciplined ZIPRA guerrillas had instigated the uprising; he called them "disloyal, misguided and politically motivated armed hooligans and political malcontents" and said that according to information before him their ultimate goal had been to topple his government. He told parliament that there had been a "definite organised pattern" amid the ZIPRA groups that had rebelled. Local ZIPRA commanders claimed ZANLA had started the fighting, while Nkomo and the mayor of Bulawayo blamed Nkala's inflammatory speech and similar statements from other ZANU–PF politicians. A month after the uprising, ZANU–PF set up a commission tasked with investigating the "mutinous disturbances" at Entumbane and in the integrated battalions at Ntabazinduna, Glenville and Connemara. This body reported to Mugabe in June 1981, but its findings have never been made public. According to the historian Norma Kriger, it blamed both ZANU–PF and ZAPU and therefore "fell short of Government expectations".

Abiodun Alao of King's College London marks the Entumbane episode as the start of the Zimbabwe National Army's politicisation. The ex-Rhodesians' enthusiasm and success during the battle, coupled with Mugabe's readiness to deploy them, convinced many in ZAPU that ZANU–PF and the white community had united against them, and intensified ZAPU opposition to the government. ZIPRA guerrillas deserted from the assembly points and the National Army en masse following the rebellion's failure, fearing for their safety. Mugabe's sense of resolve regarding his political rivals was greatly strengthened, meanwhile; Entumbane satisfied him that white army officers and airmen could be counted on in future conflicts with ZAPU. The Entumbane engagement was the RAR's last—its companies were allocated to other 1 Brigade units later in 1981 during the military reform process—but a number of its white officers subsequently led units of the Zimbabwean special forces during the 1980s. Dyck, for example, headed the 1st Parachute Battalion.

The Mugabe administration promptly decided to reduce the future army's size by about 30,000 and to disarm and demobilise all ZANLA and ZIPRA personnel who had not yet been integrated, thereby breaking the promise of a place in the army for every guerrilla. After ZIPRA commander Dumiso Dabengwa refused to give the disarming order at Entumbane, Nkomo oversaw a parade of the camp and gave the command to disarm himself, doing so "for the sake of peace", in Kriger's words, despite his own opposition to the idea. Mugabe publicly announced his deal with North Korea in August 1981, and 106 North Korean instructors arrived the same month. Nkomo accused the Prime Minister of creating "a special partisan army divorced from the national army" for the "possible imposition of a one-party state". In February 1982, Mugabe announced that huge arms caches had been discovered on ZAPU-owned properties and that this was evidence of a planned ZAPU coup. He likened Nkomo's presence in the government to "a cobra in the house" and promptly fired him, concurrently arresting ZIPRA leaders and seizing ZAPU property.

The new North Korean-trained unit, designated as the 5th Brigade, passed out in December 1982, and was deployed by Mugabe to Matabeleland, where it remained for the next five years. In what became known as Gukurahundi, it perpetrated a number of brutal massacres and atrocities against civilians in Matabeleland accused of supporting "dissidents", far exceeding anything that had occurred during the Bush War. Estimates for the number of deaths range from 10,000 to 30,000. The campaign officially ended in December 1987 when Mugabe and Nkomo signed a unity accord merging ZAPU into ZANU–PF with the stated goal of a one-party state.

== Notes and references ==
=== Newspaper and journal articles ===
- Hawkins, Tony (13 February 1981). "Factional fighting flares up in Zimbabwe; Clash of Mugabe, Nkomo groups threatens stability". The Christian Science Monitor. Boston, Massachusetts.
- Stewart, Michael P (2012), Fischer, C (ed.), The Rhodesian African Rifles: The Growth and Adaptation of Multicultural Regiment through the Rhodesian Bush War, 1965–1980 (PDF), Fort Leavenworth, Kansas: Combat Studies Institute Press, archived from the original (PDF) on 21 August 2015

=== Bibliography ===
- Alao, Abiodun (2012). Mugabe and the Politics of Security in Zimbabwe. Montreal, Quebec and Kingston, Ontario: McGill-Queen's University Press. ISBN 978-0-7735-4044-6.
- Binda, Alexandre (November 2007). Heppenstall, David (ed.). Masodja: The History of the Rhodesian African Rifles and its forerunner the Rhodesian Native Regiment. Johannesburg: 30° South Publishers. ISBN 978-1-920143-03-9.
- Binda, Alexandre (May 2008). Cocks, Chris (ed.). The Saints: The Rhodesian Light Infantry. Johannesburg: 30° South Publishers. ISBN 978-1-920143-07-7.
- Cilliers, Jakkie (December 1984). Counter-Insurgency in Rhodesia. London, Sydney & Dover, New Hampshire: Croom Helm. ISBN 978-0-7099-3412-7.
- Duignan, Peter; Gann, Lewis H (1994). Communism in Sub-Saharan Africa: a Reappraisal. Stanford, California: Hoover Press. ISBN 978-0-8179-3712-6.
- Hill, Geoff (2005) [2003]. The Battle for Zimbabwe: The Final Countdown. Johannesburg: Struik Publishers. ISBN 978-1-86872-652-3.
- Kriger, Norma (2003). Guerrilla Veterans in Post-war Zimbabwe: Symbolic and Violent Politics, 1980–1987. Cambridge: Cambridge University Press. ISBN 978-0-521-81823-0.
- Meredith, Martin (September 2007) [2002]. Mugabe: Power, Plunder and the Struggle for Zimbabwe. New York: PublicAffairs. ISBN 978-1-58648-558-0.
- Preston, Matthew (January 2005). Ending Civil War: Rhodesia and Lebanon in Perspective. International Library of War Studies. London: Tauris Academic Studies. ISBN 978-1-85043-579-2.
- Stiff, Peter (June 2000). Cry Zimbabwe: Independence – Twenty Years On. Johannesburg: Galago Publishing. ISBN 978-1-919854-02-1.
- Wood, J R T (June 2005). So Far and No Further! Rhodesia's Bid For Independence During the Retreat From Empire 1959–1965. Victoria, British Columbia: Trafford Publishing. ISBN 978-1-4120-4952-8.
