= Thyssen Henschel UR-416 =

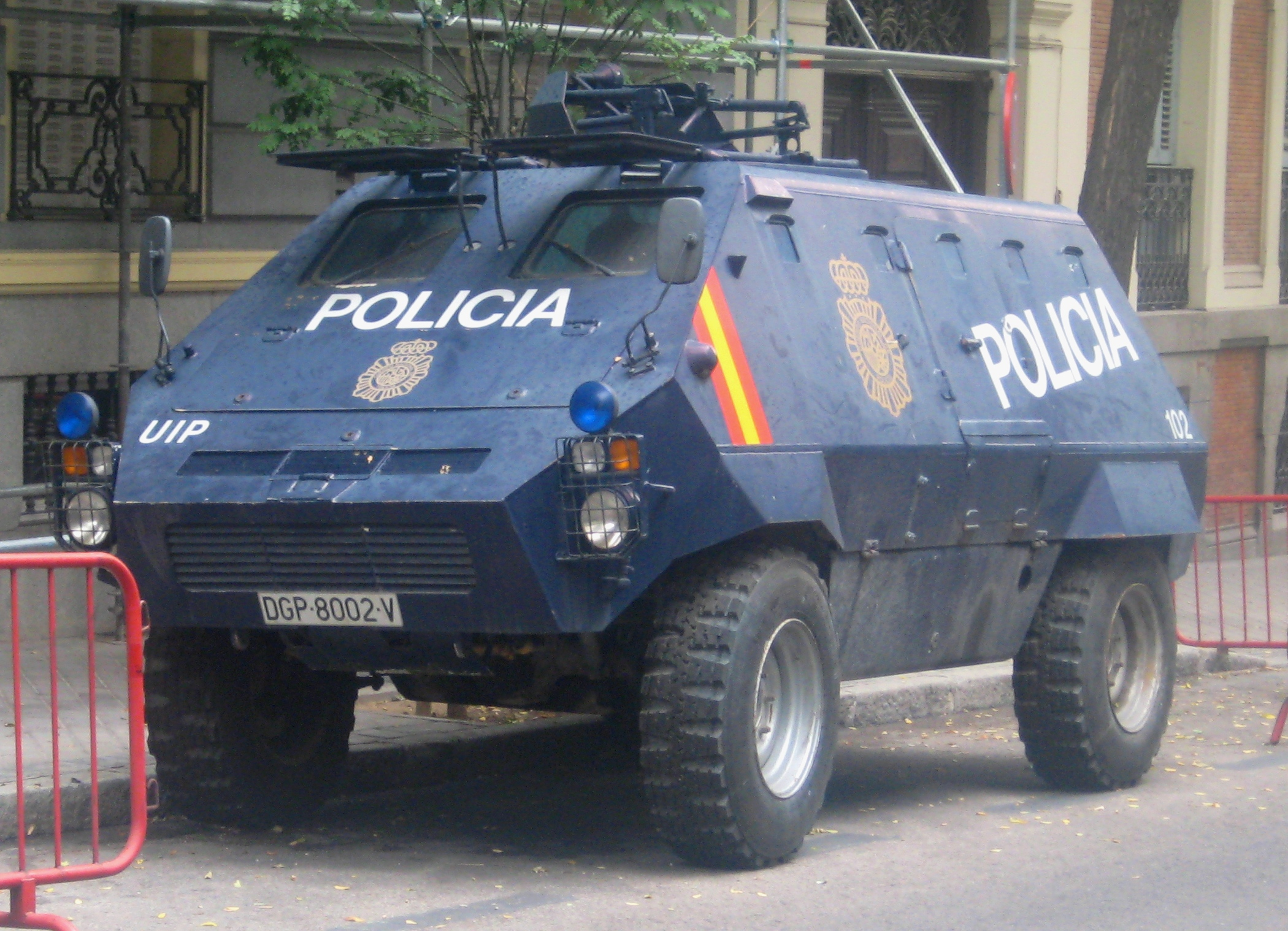
- Spanish National Police UR-416.
- Type: Armoured Personnel Carrier
- Place of origin: West Germany

Service history
- In service: 1969 – present
- Used by: Alert Police (Germany)
- Wars: Rhodesian Bush War; 1982 Lebanon War; Lebanese Civil War; Salvadoran Civil War; Internal conflict in Peru; Civil conflict in the Philippines; Insurgency in Khyber Pakhtunkhwa; Insurgency in Balochistan; Northern Mali conflict

Specifications
- Mass: 7.6 ton (combat); 5.4 ton (empty)
- Length: 5.21 m
- Width: 2.25 m
- Height: 2.52 m (with turret); 2.25 m (hull top)
- Crew: 2+8
- Armor: 9 mm welded steel
- Main armament: 1 × 7.62 mm machine gun
- Engine: Daimler-Benz OM352 turbo diesel 120 hp
- Suspension: wheels, 4 × 4
- Operational range: 600 to 700 km
- Maximum speed: 85 km/h

The Thyssen Henschel UR-416 is a German armoured personnel carrier, first introduced in 1969 and based on the body of the Mercedes-Benz Unimog light truck.

== Development ==
In 1965 an armoured car version was designed based on a Unimog 4×4 truck chassis. The UR-416 was produced in 1969 only for export. The hull is welded steel up to 9mm thick, and the driving position is in front, where there is also that of the vehicle commander.

The UR-416 was developed as a private venture by Rheinstahl Maschinenbau (which later became Thyssen Maschinenbau and is now Henschel Wehrtechnik GmbH). The first prototype was completed in 1965 and production started in 1969 and 1,030 were built, mostly for the export market. The UR-416 series is no longer being marketed and has been replaced by the TM 170, also now no longer being marketed. The UR-416 has been designed primarily for internal security operations but can also be used for a wide variety of other roles such as command and communications, reconnaissance and field workshop.

== Description ==
The UR-416 is essentially the chassis of a Mercedes-Benz U1100 Unimog 416 2.5 ton cross-country vehicle fitted with an armoured body. Spare automotive parts are identical to those used in the truck and are therefore available from commercial sources. Eight infantry soldiers can be transported in the back, while the engine is in the middle. There is one medium-sized door on each side but not a rear. The high mobility is enhanced by the suspension of the typical project, high travel time to be affiliated to surface. Generally only light machine guns are fitted as armament, but other weapons can be arranged, for example, water cannons, as well as from 20mm gun turrets. Versions include media workshop, ambulance, and command vehicle.

Optional equipment includes spherical firing ports with vision devices, fire detection and extinguishing system, air-conditioning system, heater, run-flat tyres, smoke grenade dischargers, a night vision system (passive or active), an obstacle-clearing blade front, communication to the public through megaphones, and a 5-ton (5,000 kg) capacity winch. There are also two weapons slits on each side.

Over 1,000 vehicles were exported to Africa, the Middle East, Latin America and Europe. Often the UR-416 is used for patrolling sensitive targets such as airports, or employed on internal security duties. It is rarely used for military tasks in a conventional Army, such as a standard armored personnel carrier (APC), though not in European Armies, which require more modern and better armoured vehicles.

Overall, it is very similar to the French ACMAT TPK 4.2 PSF, both are derived from the trucks of military success with a load capacity is used for the metal shell. Both models are of low cost and limited performance, but with a high efficiency and compatibility with the line of trucks logistics, and similar vehicles are often the only alternative for poorly-resourced and financed regular armies, air forces or paramilitary organizations.

== Variants ==
Ambulance - Carries eight sitting, or four sitting and two stretcher patients plus a crew of two.

Command and Communications - May be fitted with additional communications equipment and map boards.

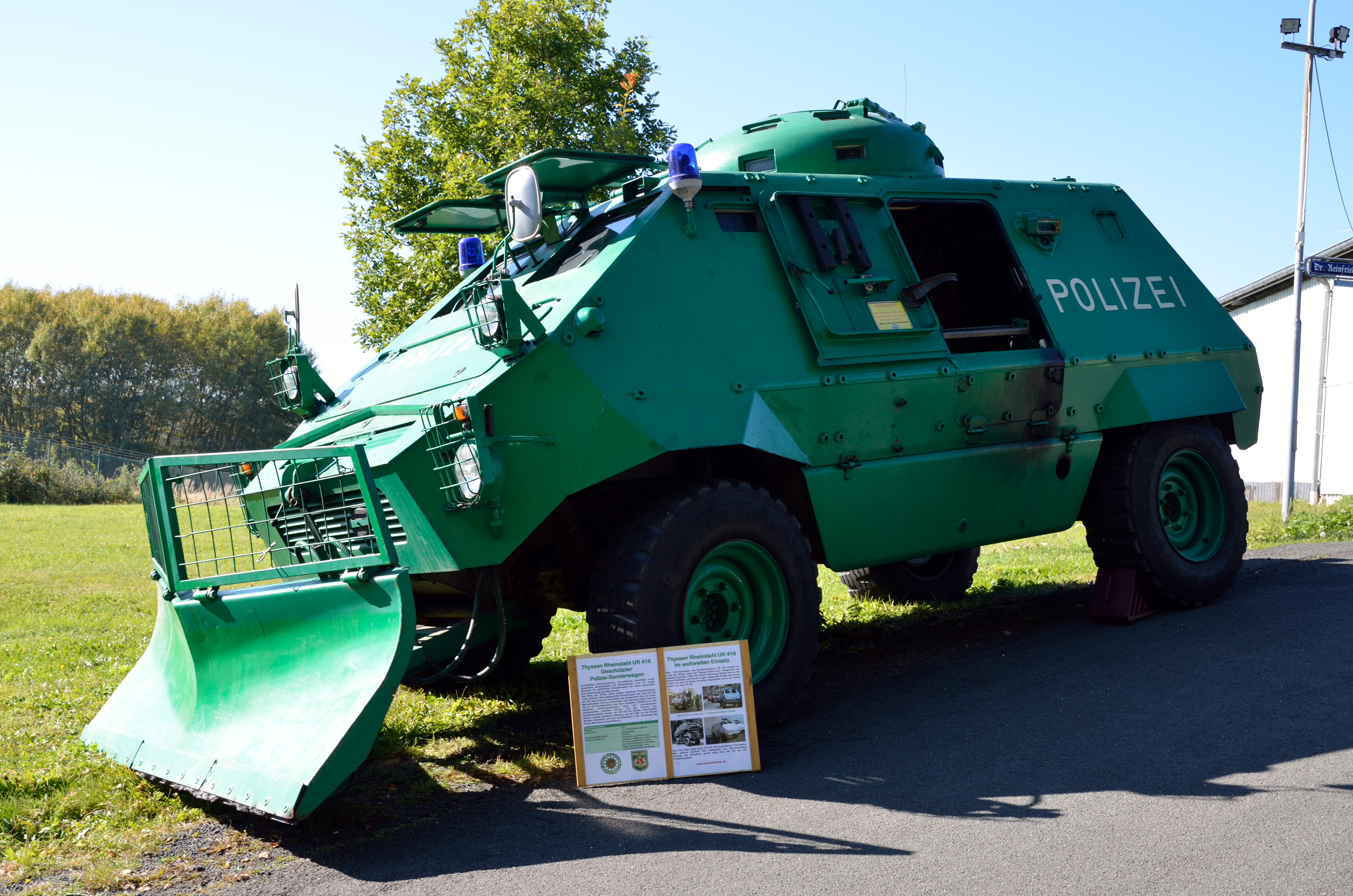
UR-416 German Polizei-Sonderwagen.

Internal Security - The internal security model can be fitted with an obstacle-clearing blade at the front of the hull. The lower half of the blade is made of welded steel with web stiffening, and the upper half consists of a pipe framework with a robust wire grille which gives the driver and commander forward observation. The height of the blade can be adjusted hydraulically from the driver's seat and it can also be removed for transport when it is usually stowed at the rear of the hull. The vehicle can be fitted with the same turrets as the reconnaissance model but one cupola has been specifically developed for the internal security role. This cupola can be rotated through 360° and is infinitely lockable in any required position. At the front of the cupola above each other are two vision blocks with bulletproof glass and ball mounts. The cupola hatch opens to the rear and can be locked at 180°. Two vision blocks with ball mounts and a further 10 vision blocks (in double rows) give improved observation. To the right of the two ball mounts is a flap which is opened to hold a tear gas nozzle. Tear gas mixture is provided from tanks which hold a maximum of 500 litres.

Reconnaissance - This could be fitted with many types of weapons turrets.

Maintenance/Repair Workshop - This has a full range of tools, work benches, a vice and cutting equipment, and an A-frame can be erected at the front of the hull to enable the vehicle to change engines and other components. When the A-frame is in use, two stabilisers are lowered at the front of the hull.

Police - The vehicle can be equipped as a police vehicle with (e.g. Mine-sweeping shield, search headlight) or more militarily (e.g. Tire pressure adjustment system, NBC protection facility, night-vision devices) additional devices to be modular equipped, and turrets with machine guns or a 20mm-cannon can be used.

== Unlicensed variants ==
In the late 1970s the UR-416 begun to be copied by some countries subjected to arms embargoes and guerrilla organizations which were unable to acquire it legally.

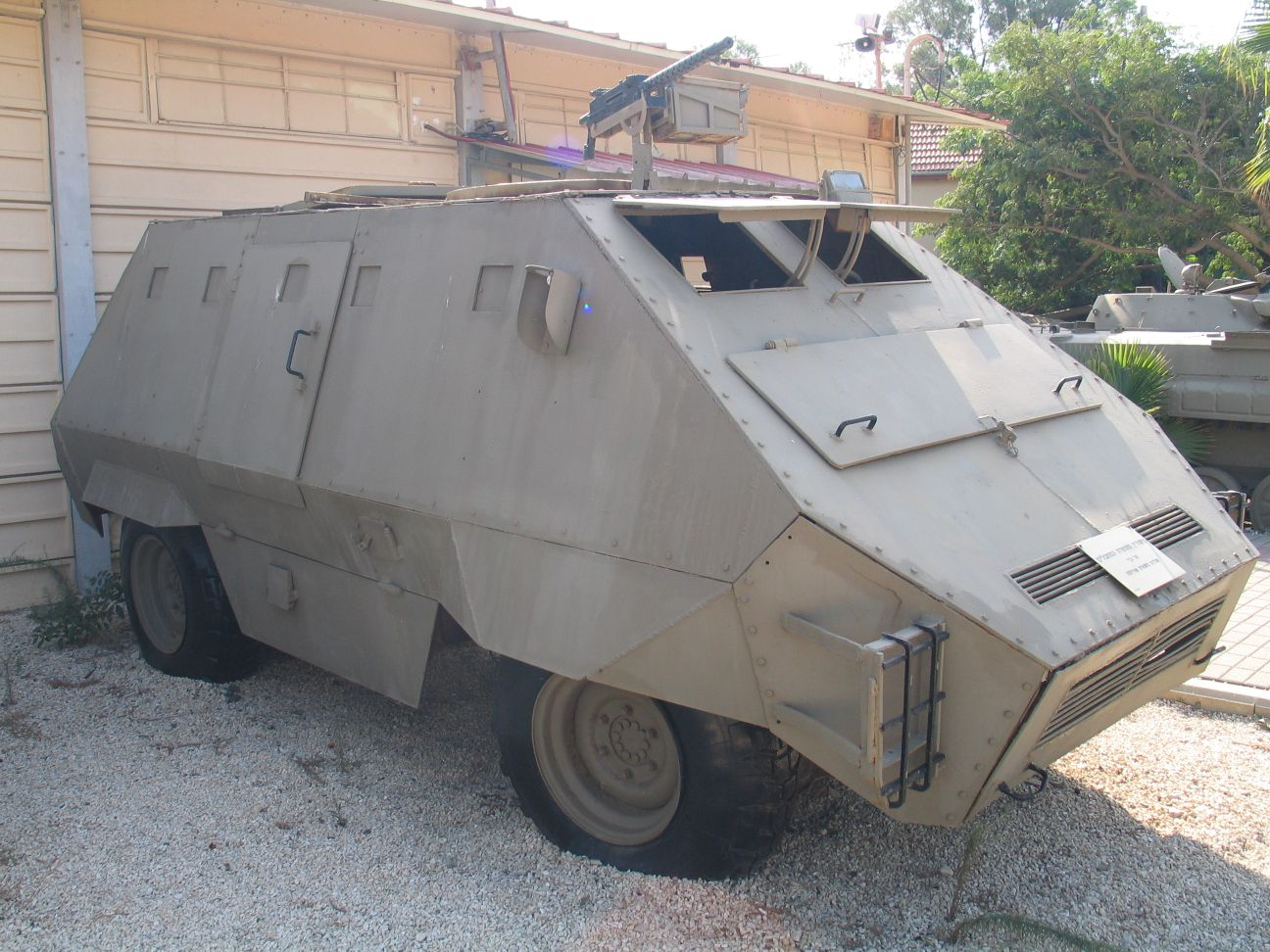
PLO built UR-416 clone on static display at the Batey Ha-Osef Museum, Tel Aviv, Israel, 2005.

=== PLO ===
The Palestine Liberation Organization (PLO) guerrilla factions based in Lebanon assembled at their workshops in the Palestinian refugee camps of West Beirut some eight armoured cars which differed little from the original UR-416 design. Minor details could be found in the positioning of the headlights, which were bolted to the side of the engine compartment and protected by a box-shaped brush guard, instead of being mounted on top as per in the West German model. They were first displayed publicly at a PLO parade held at Beirut in April 1981, some of them fitted with roof-top AT-3 Sagger or ENTAC anti-tank missile systems though period photos show that they were more often armed with a single Browning M1919A4 .30 caliber (7.62mm) or M2HB .50 Browning (12.7×99mm) heavy machine guns mounted in the roof.

=== Rhodesia ===
Another country to produce clandestine copies of the UR-416 in the 1970s was Rhodesia. In October 1976 the Rhodesian Army's special counter-insurgency unit, the Selous Scouts, decided to build two armoured vehicles of this type for their cross-border covert raids ('externals') on ZANLA guerrilla bases in neighbouring Mozambique. Plans were drawn by the Rhodesian Corps of Engineers' (RhCE) drawing office from a commercial brochure and the vehicles were assembled in just three weeks at the Army Workshops of Inkomo Garrison by a team of skilled Scouts using South African Iscor 6mm ballistic steel plates. Unlike other Rhodesian armoured vehicles however, they were not protected against landmines. Nicknamed the 'Pig', the first vehicle was an exact copy of the original design, having an all-welded body with a fully enclosed troop compartment. The second 'Pig' differed slightly, having a raised roof over the driver and commander seats, a rear door and an open-top troop compartment at the back, which allowed provision for three FN MAG-58 7.62×51mm NATO light machine guns to be installed on pivot mounts mounted on the vehicle's inner side walls. For additional firepower, the vehicles were often armed with twin Browning M1919A4 Mk 2 medium machine guns re-chambered in the .303 British cartridge or British Hispano Mk.V 20mm autocannons taken from decommissioned Rhodesian Air Force de Havilland Vampire Mk9 single-seater fighter jets and mounted on a pintle fitted with a gun shield to protect the gunner.

The design of the UR-416 provided the basis which inspired the Rhodesians to develop the more advanced and highly successful Mine Protected Combat Vehicle (MPCV) in 1978-79.

== Combat history ==
=== Africa ===
The Rhodesian 'Pigs' were successfully tested in combat by a Selous Scouts' flying mini-column that raided two ZANLA camps on the Mapai area of southern Mozambique in October 1976 (Operation Mardon) and later resumed the same role during the September 1979 raid on the ZANLA's New Chimoio base in Mozambique (Operation Miracle) though their lack of mine-protection was found to be a major drawback. Despite this design flaw, the vehicles served well the Selous Scouts in their operations and even after the disbandment of the unit in 1980 they remained at the service of the new Zimbabwe National Army (ZNA) for several more years.

An UR-416 of the Togolese contingent of the United Nations Multidimensional Integrated Stabilization Mission in Mali (MINUSMA) was also ambushed and destroyed by the Jama'at Nasr al-Islam wal Muslimin on 29 May 2016.

=== Middle East ===
At least one PLO UR-416 was captured in West Beirut by the Israeli Defence Forces (IDF) in the wake of the Israeli invasion of Lebanon in June 1982 and it is now in display at the Batey Ha-Osef Museum, Tel Aviv, Israel. The pro-Israeli Christian Lebanese Forces (LF) militia also managed to salvage the remaining seven vehicles in early 1983, which one of their 'Commando' units later employed at the battle for the Sidon bridgehead in 1985 against the locally based Popular Nasserist Organization (PNO) militia. One of these vehicles was captured from the LF by the PNO who quickly pressed it into service, remaining in their hands until the end of the Lebanese Civil War in October 1990. The fate of the remaining six vehicles is unknown, with various sources stating that they were left uncompleted in their West Beirut workshops and were later destroyed in the violent clashes that ravaged the Lebanese Capital in the 1980s.

=== Latin America ===
Ten UR-416 armoured cars were acquired from West Germany by the El Salvador government between 1971 and 1975 and were employed by the Salvadoran Army in Counter-insurgency and internal security duties, including patrol and road convoy escort roles, during the Salvadoran Civil War. For additional protection against RPG-2 and RPG-7 anti-tank rounds, some of the vehicles have been fitted with wire mesh screens, which detonate the HEAT warheads of the PG-2 and PG-7 projectiles before they came into contact with the vehicle's armour body. Salvadoran UR-416 armoured cars are normally armed with a M2HB .50 Browning (12.7×99mm) heavy machine gun mounted on the roof, sometimes fitted with a shield to protect the gunner, whilst some vehicles also have in addition a M60D machine gun (7.62×51mm) and shield mounted on the roof at the rear. At least six to eight UR-416 vehicles have survived the civil war and remain in service with the Salvadoran Army, with a few now being fitted with appliqué passive armour on their hull sides.

=== South East Asia ===
The Philippine Government acquired nine UR-416 armoured cars in 1973, which included two vehicles armed with Oerlikon 20mm Cannons and seven others armed with a M2HB .50 Browning (12.7×99mm) heavy machine gun mounted on the roof. The two vehicles equipped with the 20mm cannons entered service with the Philippine Marine Corps, who nicknamed them "Acerro" (Steel) in honor of Sgt. Nestor Acerro, who was killed in action at the Battle of Sibalo Hill while fighting Moro Islamic Liberation Front militants, whereas the seven remaining vehicles fitted with the HMGs were issued to the Philippine Constabulary. This batch of UR-416 armoured cars was ordered by the Philippine Department of National Defense for field evaluation by both the Marines and the Constabulary, which after testing them recommended the adoption of tropicalization modifications such as airconditioning and a modified exhaust for crossing rivers, in order to better suit the operational conditions in Mindanao. They were later decommissioned and scrapped upon the arrival of the Bravia Chaimite armoured cars.

== Operators ==
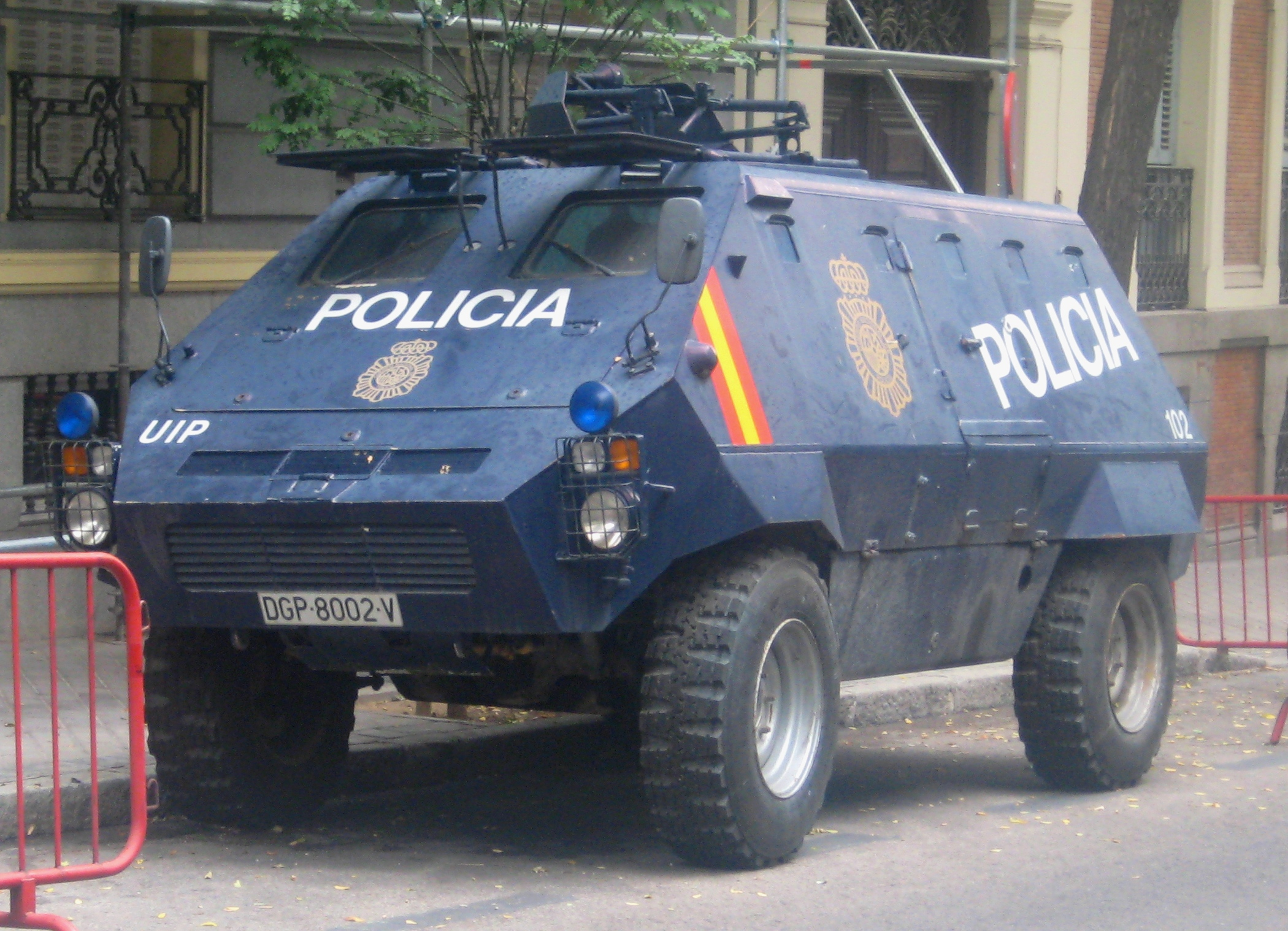
National Police Corps of Spain UR-416

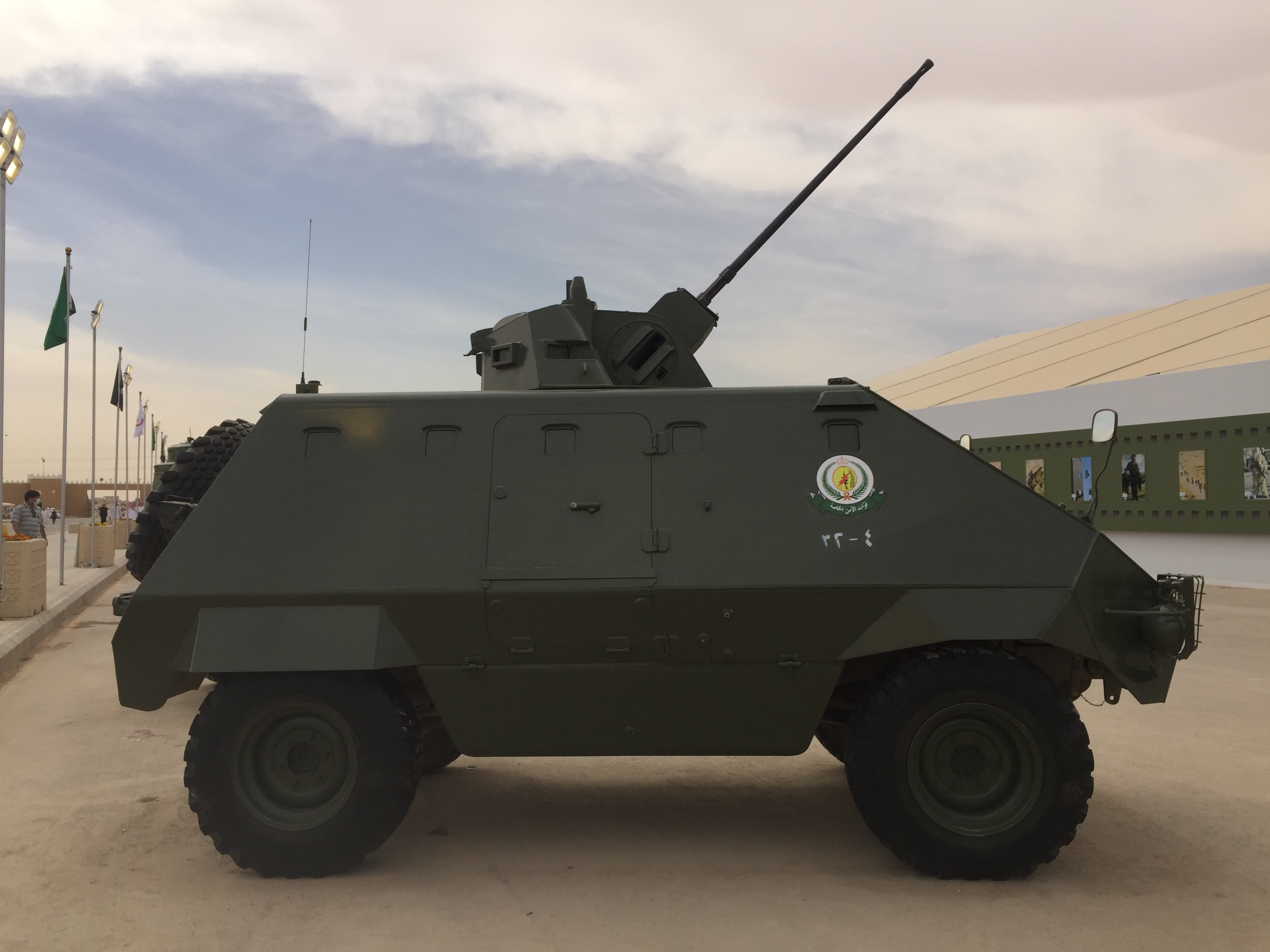
Saudi Special Security Force UR-416

Current user countries of the UR-416 are:

- Ecuador
- El Salvador: 8 in service with the Salvadoran Army.
- Kenya: 52 in service with the Kenya Army.
- Morocco
- Pakistan: 45 in service with the Frontier Corps.
- Peru
- Qatar
- Saudi Arabia: In service with the Saudi Special Security Force.
- Spain: In service with the Spanish Police.
- Togo:
- Venezuela: In service with the Venezuelan National Guard.

=== Former operators ===
- Germany: In service with the Alert Police; retired.
- Lebanon: Seven ex-PLO vehicles in service with the Lebanese Forces, and a single one later in service with the Popular Nasserist Organization.
- Netherlands
- Palestine: 8 in service with the Palestine Liberation Organization in Lebanon.
- Philippines: 2 in service with the Philippine Marine Corps armed with 20mm Oerlikon Cannons sent for testing in the Southern Philippines.
- Philippine Constabulary: 7 vehicles procured in 1973, armed with 12.7mm Heavy Machine guns.
- Rhodesia (now Zimbabwe): 2 in service with the Selous Scouts passed on to successor state.
- Turkey: Widely used by the Gendarmerie General Command; currently all vehicles removed from active service.

=== Evaluation-only operators ===
- Portugal: 1 prototype evaluated by the Portuguese Army in 1967.
- South Korea: A few vehicles were brought and evaluated along with the Fiat CM6614 in 1976.

== See also ==
- ACMAT
- Bullet TCV
- Gazelle FRV
- Hippo APC
- List of weapons of the Lebanese Civil War
- List of weapons of the Rhodesian Bush War
- Mine Protected Combat Vehicle
- Mercedes-Benz Unimog
- Selous Scouts
- Weapons of the Salvadoran Civil War
