= Super Zimbabwe African People's Union =

The Super Zimbabwe African People's Union was a militant organization, made up of former members of the Zimbabwe People's Revolutionary Army (ZIPRA),Rhodesian Security Forces and turned ANC cadres ( ASKARIs ), which operated in Zimbabwe in the 1980s. Super ZAPU members were believed to have been supported by South Africa's apartheid government as a proxy in Zimbabwe to undermine Prime Minister Robert Mugabe's new government.

Author Joseph Hanlon argues in Beggar Your Neighbours: Apartheid power in Southern Africa that Super ZAPU members were former ZIPRA fighters who fought on behalf of South Africa.
