= 1980 Entumbane clashes =

Political clashes in Zimbabwe

- Part of the aftermath of the Rhodesian Bush War
Date	9 – 10 November 1980
Location	Bulawayo, Zimbabwe
Result	Decisive Zimbabwean Government victory; uprising put down.

Belligerents
ZIPRA elements	Zimbabwe; Zimbabwe Defence Forces; Zimbabwe Republic Police	ZANLA elements

Commanders and leaders
Unknown	(Zimbabwe) Canaan Banana (Zimbabwe) Robert Mugabe	Unknown

Casualties and losses
- 58 dead, 500 injured

The 1980 Entumbane clashes, also known as Entumbane I, occurred in and around Bulawayo, Zimbabwe between 9 and 10 November 1980, amid political tensions in the months immediately following Zimbabwean independence.

Fighting broke out in the city's western suburb of Entumbane between groups of guerrillas from the Zimbabwe African National Liberation Army (ZANLA) and others from the Zimbabwe People's Revolutionary Army (ZIPRA), days after the two factions were put into coterminous assembly camps there to await integration into the new Zimbabwe National Army. A four-hour firefight, precipitated by a speech by government minister Enos Nkala threatening that ZANLA would ultimately destroy ZIPRA, ended when the largely white-led BSAP Support Unit, numbering over 280 men from Echo Troop, Juliet Troop, Hotel Troop, Charlie Troop and Lima Troop, intervened on behalf of the government. (The Rhodesian African Rifles at that time were confined to barracks due to disagreements about integration into the new Zimbabwean National Army. They were officially on "reaction standby".) Officers from both guerrilla forces then called for a ceasefire.

Official government figures counted 58 dead (15 combatants and 43 civilians) and over 500 wounded, but eyewitness accounts describe a death toll running into the hundreds. The conflict was followed four months later by the larger 1981 Entumbane Uprising, also known as Entumbane II, which nearly developed into a new civil war.

== Notes and references ==
Bibliography

- Binda, Alexandre (November 2007). Heppenstall, David (ed.). Masodja: The History of the Rhodesian African Rifles and its forerunner the Rhodesian Native Regiment. Johannesburg: 30° South Publishers. ISBN 978-1920143039.
- Hill, Geoff (2005) [2003]. The Battle for Zimbabwe: The Final Countdown. Johannesburg: Struik Publishers. ISBN 978-1868726523.
- Kriger, Norma (2003). Guerrilla Veterans in Post-war Zimbabwe: Symbolic and Violent Politics, 1980–1987. Cambridge: Cambridge University Press. ISBN 978-0-521-81823-0.
