= Selous Scouts =

Rhodesian Army special forces unit

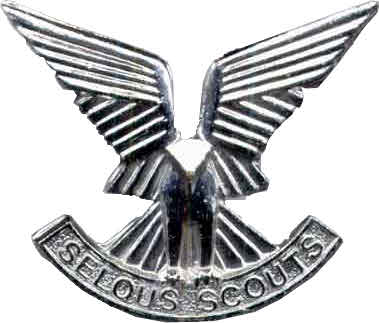
- The insignia of the Selous Scouts
- Active: 1973–1980
- Country: Republic of Rhodesia
- Type: Special forces
- Part of: Rhodesian Army
- Conflict: Rhodesian Bush War
- Commander: Ronald Reid-Daly

The Selous Scouts /səˈluː/ was a special forces unit of the Rhodesian Army that operated during the Rhodesian Bush War from 1973 until the reconstitution of the country as Zimbabwe in 1980. It was mainly responsible for infiltrating the black majority population of Rhodesia and collecting intelligence on insurgents so that they could be attacked by regular elements of the security forces. The unit did this by forming small teams that posed as insurgents and usually included captured insurgents. Over time, the Selous Scouts increasingly attacked insurgents themselves and operated in the countries that neighboured Rhodesia.

The unit developed a reputation for brutality and was responsible for attacking and killing civilians. The Selous Scouts were also involved in the Rhodesian chemical and biological weapons programme and used poisons and biological agents in some of its operations. The methods used by the unit led to the deaths of large numbers of insurgents, but proved counter-productive as they further alienated the black majority population from the white minority Rhodesian government and increased international opposition to the regime.

Following the disbandment of the Selous Scouts after Rhodesia's transition to Zimbabwe, many of its members were recruited into the Apartheid-era South African security forces. They contributed to the adoption of the Selous Scouts' methods by the South African Defence Force and South African Police, and some took part in operations to undermine the government of Zimbabwe.

== Background ==
In November 1965 the government of the British colony of Southern Rhodesia issued an illegal Unilateral Declaration of Independence. This government represented the country's small white minority and was led by Prime Minister Ian Smith. The black majority of the population had little influence on the government, which sought to continue white racial privileges. At the time of independence the Rhodesian Security Forces were relatively large and well trained and equipped.

Two groups with armed elements emerged as the opposition to the white Rhodesian regime. These were the Zimbabwe African National Union (ZANU), whose military wing was the Zimbabwe African National Liberation Army (ZANLA), and the Zimbabwe African People's Union (ZAPU) and its armed wing the Zimbabwe People's Revolutionary Army (ZIPRA). Both groups were initially based in Zambia, and from the late 1960s began dispatching insurgents into Rhodesia who used guerrilla tactics. These attacks initially proved ineffective and the Rhodesian military, which had been bolstered by forces from South Africa, was able to effectively counter them. Rhodesia's security situation began to deteriorate from late 1972, when the guerrilla armies began making more effective attacks in the north-east of the country. The collapse of the Portuguese Empire in 1975 that led to the independence of Mozambique led to a further increase to the challenges facing the Rhodesian regime, with the guerrillas using that country as well as Botswana as bases.

A tactic in which security forces pose as 'pseudo' insurgents to gather intelligence was developed prior to the Rhodesian Bush War, and had also been used by police forces. Pseudo operations involve security force personnel being trained to closely imitate insurgents. Teams of these personnel then enter regions where insurgents are active and portray themselves as insurgents. After establishing credibility, the team collects intelligence on actual insurgents and their sources of support. These tactics can be most necessary in regions where the insurgents have eliminated the government's sources of intelligence, as was the case in north-eastern Rhodesia in 1973. In general, 'pseudo' teams undertake only intelligence collection work, and do not attack insurgents themselves. 'Pseudo' tactics are generally most effective when the teams include former insurgents who have been 'turned' to side with the government. The effectiveness of these tactics is partially dependent on their use not becoming known, as this will lead to insurgents improving their security processes. Internationally, there has also been a risk of pseudo units breaking the law. If local civilians learn that the security forces are posing as insurgents and using this as cover to break the law, the tactics can be counter-productive as they will erode support for the government. The British authorities used pseudo tactics during the Malayan Emergency, with this coming to the attention of the Rhodesians who took part in that conflict.

== Unit history ==
=== Establishment ===
The British South Africa Police's Special Branch began pseudo operations to collect intelligence in 1966. The Rhodesian Army took part in a joint trial using these tactics with the British South Africa Police and Special Branch that year, but it was not successful for at that stage the black population was largely indifferent to the insurgents and so not able to provide intelligence on them.

The ZANLA began to gain control over north-eastern Rhodesia from 1971, and considerably strengthened its influence over the population in the region over the next year. This led to the networks of informers who had provided information to the Rhodesian Government ceasing to do so, which made it difficult for the security forces to locate and counter the insurgents. In response, Special Branch began to establish pseudo teams in January 1973. The Rhodesian Army also formed two such teams in February; these comprised members of C Squadron 22 (Rhodesian) SAS, black soldiers from the Rhodesian African Rifles and former insurgents. These teams enjoyed success, leading to a decision to expand pseudo operations.

Major Ronald Francis Reid-Daly was selected to command the unit that became the Selous Scouts in November 1973. He was personally selected for this role by Lieutenant General Peter Walls, the head of the Rhodesian Army. An initial group of 25 personnel were selected and trained at Makuti near Lake Kariba. The first troop completed training and began operations in January 1974, followed by two other troops in February and March that year. At this time, the Selous Scouts comprised about 120 personnel and all of its officers were white. Black soldiers were offered bonuses that almost doubled their salary if they agreed to serve with the Selous Scouts.

The unit was named after the British explorer Frederick Selous (1851–1917) and its motto was pamwe chete—a Shona phrase meaning "all together", "together only" or "forward together". The charter of the Selous Scouts directed them to "the clandestine elimination of terrorism both within and without the country". The name Selous Scouts had previously been attached to the Rhodesian Armoured Car Regiment of the Federal Army of Rhodesia and Nyasaland.

The South African Police's Special Branch provided funding for the Selous Scouts. This formed part of the South African Government's extensive support for the Rhodesian counterinsurgency effort. Many South African Defence Force personnel served in the Selous Scouts between 1973 and 1979, including during operations in Rhodesia, Mozambique and Zambia. After the South African Government publicly withdrew the South African Police units which had been deployed to Rhodesia in 1975 SADF personnel continued to serve with the Selous Scouts. A witness who testified at the post-Apartheid South African Truth and Reconciliation Commission stated that the Selous Scouts were covertly funded by the South African Police and South African police officers also served in the unit.

=== Expansion ===
Due to the success of the Selous Scouts, Walls directed in mid-1974 that it be expanded from three to six troops. This process was completed by December 1974, and included 50 former insurgents being added to the unit. A Reconnaissance Troop was formed in the second half of 1976 to conduct scouting operations in Mozambique and Zambia; this unit had a peak strength of twelve men.

As part of the expansion of the Selous Scouts, the Rhodesian Army's Tracking Wing and Tracker Combat Unit were merged into it during 1974. The Tracking Wing became the Selous Scouts' Training Troop. The Selous Scouts continued to deliver training in tracking and trackers for the remainder of the war, with this forming a cover for the unit's actual role. The Tracker Combat Unit was made up of white reservists; while these men were not suitable for Selous Scouts operations, they were retained to help provide cover. These changes reduced the effectiveness of the Rhodesian Army's tracking capabilities.

The size of the Selous Scouts increased further over time, and eventually reached 1,800 men. Many of these were territorial soldiers who were not permanently attached. The rapid expansion of the Selous Scouts led to a drop in the quality of its personnel, which reduced the effectiveness of pseudo operations. This in turn caused the unit to increasingly undertake offensive operations where it directly attacked insurgents rather than gathered intelligence on them. From 1979 former Selous Scouts became part of a scheme where they were armed by the Rhodesian Army and paid bounties for killing insurgents.

The overlap in roles between the Selous Scouts and the SAS led to friction between the two units. They also competed for personnel, with the demands of the Selous Scouts leading to a decline in the effectiveness of the SAS as well as the Rhodesian Light Infantry and Rhodesian African Rifles.

The decline in the effectiveness and discipline within the Selous Scouts led to concerns from other elements of the Rhodesian Army. Selous Scouts were accused of poaching ivory, and Reid-Daly's office was bugged by investigators. He was convicted by a court-martial after publicly confronting Lieutenant General John Hickman, the commander of the Rhodesian Army, over the bugging and left the Army afterwards.

=== Disbandment ===
Ahead of the multi-racial 1980 Southern Rhodesian general election the Selous Scouts and SAS were involved in preparing plans to annul its results. One of these plans would have involved killing the leadership of the black nationalist parties in Operation Hectic. Another, designated Operation Quartz would have involved attacking the insurgents in the camps where they had been concentrated within Rhodesia ahead of the election. These operations were not attempted.

Following the transition to majority rule and Rhodesia's reconstitution as Zimbabwe, Prime Minister Robert Mugabe decided in March 1980 to disband the Selous Scouts by April that year. Mugabe stated that the unit needed to be disbanded as part of reforms to provide Zimbabwe with a "respectable" army. At this time it was expected that many of its white members would leave the military. Walls received a hostile reception from the unit's officers and men when he visited its base in March 1980. During this visit members of the Selous Scouts called him a traitor. The Selous Scouts were disbanded without a formal ceremony to mark the occasion in April 1980. The unit had suffered between 30 and 35 fatalities during its existence.

Most of the white members of the Selous Scouts moved to South Africa to join that country's security forces. The 900 black members of the unit were offered other positions within Zimbabwe's security forces, and were mainly split across three battalions of the Rhodesian African Rifles. Many of the black former Selous Scouts were murdered following the transition to majority rule.

== Structure ==
While an Army unit, the Selous Scouts came under the operational control of Special Branch from its establishment in November 1973. This involved Special Branch controlling where the unit operated and how the intelligence it collected was used. Special Branch also had some influence over the Selous Scouts' training. In terms of Army hierarchy, the Selous Scouts reported directly to Walls. The unit was under orders from Special Branch to not pass any information directly to the Rhodesian Directorate of Military Intelligence, which contributed to very little of the intelligence it collected being provided to Army units.

The Selous Scouts and other Rhodesian special forces continued to report directly to Walls for military purposes after he became the Commander of Combined Operations (COMOPS) in 1977. The Army headquarters provided administrative and logistical support. As the Selous Scouts increased in size and increasingly undertook offensive operations it became impossible for Special Branch to adequately oversee the unit.

Each troop within the Selous Scouts comprised three sections, each usually with nine to twelve men. The size of sections varied, however, and could be as large as 30 men. Selous Scout teams usually included both black and white personnel, with the men forming close bonds. Until almost the end of the war, all of the officers in the Selous Scouts were white.

== Tactics within Rhodesia ==
In line with 'pseudo' doctrine, the role of the Selous Scout was to infiltrate the black population of Rhodesia and penetrate networks of insurgents. They were to then collect intelligence on the locations of insurgent forces and guide attacks on them. Where possible, Selous Scout teams would remain in place for lengthy periods. Selous Scout teams were also used in a 'hunter killer' role, in which they followed insurgent supply networks from contested areas within Rhodesia to neighbouring countries and killed any insurgents they located during the process. Selous Scout teams were usually successful in impersonating insurgents, even though their tradecraft was at times poor. The unit was more successful in penetrating ZANLA than ZIPRA, as the latter was better disciplined and had stronger command and control processes.

To prevent the regular army or police from firing at Selous Scout teams while they were operating, authorities would declare "frozen areas", where all Army and Police units were ordered to temporarily cease all operations in, and withdraw from, without being told the actual rationale. Little information was provided to the Army units on the results of these operations or the intelligence that was collected. 'Freezing' areas generally proved operationally successful, but there were several occasions in which the security forces inadvertently attacked and killed Selous Scouts.

The Rhodesian military established fireforce teams to exploit the intelligence collected by the Selous Scouts. These initially involved groups of soldiers that were inserted by helicopter, and were later expanded with paratroopers. The Rhodesian Light Infantry often provided the soldiers for fireforce teams.

A key element of the Selous Scouts' methods was 'turning' captured insurgents to join the Rhodesian security forces. This was normally attempted shortly after insurgents were captured, with them being both threatened and offered incentives. The captured insurgent was usually approached by a former insurgent. In the resulting conversation, the former insurgent emphasised the hardships insurgents were experiencing and that those who were captured faced the death penalty under the Law and Order (Maintenance) Act. This legislation imposed severe penalties for people found to be members of subversive organisations, including the death penalty or long prison terms. The captured insurgent was also offered a lump sum payment as well as a soldier's salary if they agreed to fight for the Rhodesian government. If an insurgent agreed to be 'turned' and passed further vetting, they were assigned to a Selous Scout team and operated in regions in which they would not be recognised. Where possible, their family was housed on a Selous Scouts base. Only a small number of 'turned' insurgents ever deserted or betrayed the unit. Some of the prisoners captured by the Selous Scouts who refused to be 'turned' were killed.

One of the tactics used by the Selous Scouts was to violate local customs while posing as insurgents with the goal of reducing support for the actual insurgents. The Selous Scouts also sought to increase the divisions between the ZANLA and ZIPRA by posing as members of one group and then attacking members of the other group. These tactics became publicly known and embarrassed the government.

The Selous Scouts were probably responsible for killing black business owners in rural areas who provided support for the insurgents. These killings were conducted secretly.

Special Branch provided the Selous Scouts with poisoned clothing, food, beverages and medicines that the unit inserted into the guerrilla supply chains. The use of contaminated supplies resulted in the reported deaths of over 800 guerrillas, and the likely death toll probably reached well over 1,000.

The Rhodesian Directorate of Military Intelligence estimated in 1978 that the Selous Scouts were responsible for 68% of insurgent fatalities within Rhodesia. These casualties largely resulted from attacks by Rhodesian Army units on insurgents located by the Selous Scouts. However, the unit's ruthless tactics were counter-productive as they contributed to further alienating Rhodesia's black population from the government. This formed part of broader flaws in the Rhodesian counter-insurgency strategy, and the historian Jakkie Cilliers has written that "the Selous Scouts were merely the instruments of an overly aggressive and punitive strategy, simply directed at killing as many insurgents as possible and punishing the rural black population to force them to desist from support for the insurgent forces.

The apparent success of the Selous Scouts led to the unit being glamorised. However, the Rhodesian leadership considered the all-white SAS to be more professional and security conscious than the Selous Scouts.

== External operations ==
The Selous Scouts were involved in the Rhodesian military's attacks on insurgents and their bases in neighbouring countries, often known as external operations (or 'externals' for short). These operations became frequent from 1976. The unit's role in external operations included intelligence collection and directly attacking insurgents. In the intelligence gathering role, the Selous Scouts' Reconnaissance Troop conducted one or two man long-range reconnaissance patrols to locate or gather information on insurgent bases in Mozambique and Zambia. During direct attacks the Selous Scouts often impersonated soldiers of the country they were operating in.

The Selous Scouts operated in eastern Botswana. This included fighting small actions against insurgents and a raid in which ZAPU leaders were captured in Francistown. The Selous Scouts also used pseudo tactics to collect intelligence in Francistown.

Operation Long John was launched on 25 June 1976, against two guerilla bases located in Mozambique. This operation used 'flying column' tactics for the first time, which involved six vehicles manned by the Selous Scouts attacking the bases. Large quantities of munitions were destroyed, but few casualties were inflicted.

On 9 August 1976, the Selous Scouts carried out Operation Eland, a raid on a ZANLA and FRELIMO controlled refugee camp at Nyadzonia in Mozambique. The Selous Scouts, who were mostly black and disguised in FRELIMO uniforms, included former Portuguese Army soldiers and a former ZANLA commander. They drove into the camp past FRELIMO guards to the parade ground where many were assembled before the attack commenced. The head of the Selous Scouts, Ronald Francis Reid-Daly, claimed that captured ZANLA documents showed that the people killed in the raid were either trained guerrillas or were undergoing guerrilla instruction and training. Paul L. Moorcraft and Peter McLaughlin wrote in 1982, that "although the camp did contain trained guerrillas and young recruits, many of its inhabitants were old people, women and young children who had fled from Rhodesia as refugees". They further wrote in 2010, that "although nearly all the personnel in the camp were unarmed, many were trained guerillas or undergoing instruction" and that documents captured from ZANLA, revealed more than 1,028 were killed in the operation. A 1994 Amnesty International publication described the operation as a massacre and stated that the camp at Nyadzonya housed refugees, and that a soldier who participated in the raid later stated: "We were told that Nyadzonia was a camp containing several thousand unarmed refugees who could be recruited to join the guerrillas. It would be easier if we went in and wiped them out while they were unarmed and before they were trained rather than waiting for the possibility of them being trained and sent back armed into Rhodesia". According to Amnesty International, 1,000 people were killed and the operation was "a gross human rights violation and a war crime". The South African government was angered by this escalation of the war, and withdrew its military and diplomatic support for the Rhodesian regime. Pressure from South Africa led Prime Minister Smith to accept the principle of black majority rule in Rhodesia in September 1976.

The Selous Scouts unsuccessfully attempted to assassinate Joshua Nkomo, the leader of ZIPRA, while he was in Zambia.

While the attacks made outside of Rhodesia by the Selous Scouts were usually militarily successful, they worsened the country's political position. This was because they resulted in civilians and members of the armed forces in the neighbouring countries being killed.

== Atrocities and illegal activities ==
The Selous Scouts had a reputation for brutality. The unit conducted a number of atrocities against villages that were believed to have collaborated with the guerrillas. Members of the units also poached ivory, smuggled guns and beat and killed civilians. During attacks into Botswana, the Selous Scouts committed arson and abducted civilians. The use of insurgent uniforms and civilian clothing by the Selous Scouts may also have violated the 1907 Hague Convention and the Geneva Conventions which prohibit military personnel from wearing enemy uniforms in most circumstances and require that they clearly distinguish themselves from civilians.

Some of the actions undertaken by the Selous Scouts were illegal under Rhodesian law. Selous Scout teams at times attacked Rhodesian Security Forces units and white farms in attempts to persuade local civilians that they were actually insurgents. Another tactic involved repeatedly calling in air strikes and fireforce attacks on insurgents after they had left a specific kraal leading the insurgents to kill innocent civilians in the kraal because they suspected civilians of informing on their positions; it was intended that this would sow divisions between the insurgents and civilians. The Selous Scouts also labelled insurgents as traitors to the insurgent cause and then publicly killed them leading to "disillusionment and bewilderment" among local civilians; this led to several murder investigations being opened into members of the unit. While these illegal activities provided substantial short-term benefits for the Rhodesian government, over the longer term they became well known among civilians and undermined the rule of law and the government's legitimacy.

Robert Mugabe accused the Selous Scouts of killing priests and missionaries. The New York Times noted in 1979 that while no evidence had been provided to support this claim the Rhodesian Catholic Commission for Justice and Peace believed that an unnamed "rogue unit" of the Rhodesian security forces had been disciplined for killing seven religious figures in 1977. In 1980 The Washington Post reported that the Selous Scouts had bombed churches.

Atrocities conducted by Selous Scouts operating under the guise of insurgents were often blamed on the insurgents in Rhodesian propaganda publications and broadcasts. These atrocities included mutilating civilians, with photos of the victims being included in Rhodesian propaganda.

The unit was also involved with the Rhodesian chemical and biological weapons programme. By 1975 some of the prisoners who were held at the Selous Scouts' secret detention centre at Mount Darwin were being used by the Central Intelligence Organisation (CIO) for human testing of chemical and biological weapons. The bodies of these prisoners were dumped in mine shafts. During 1976 members of the Selous Scouts disseminated V. cholerae in the Ruya River. The unit also used the material to contaminate the water supply of the town of Cochemane in Mozambique. Deaths from cholera occurred in both areas. The Selous Scouts may also have spread anthrax. According to former CIO Officer Henrik Ellert, an incident where Selous Scouts poisoned a well with unknown substances in an area of heavy rebel activity near Rhodesia's border with Mozambique killed 200 civilians.

Historians hold differing views on the extent to which the Selous Scouts committed atrocities. Paul L. Moorcraft and Peter McLaughlin argued in 1982 that the Selous Scouts' "notoriety for treachery and brutality was only partly deserved, for the bulk of its members were engaged on routine military tasks". They also stated that as the Selous Scouts came under the direct command of the Commander for Combined Operations, the most senior officers in the Rhodesian security forces were complicit in at least some of the atrocities the unit committed. Theodore L. Gatchel has written that the Selous Scouts were frequently accused of a wide range of crimes, but it is difficult to differentiate their real crimes from false accusations and atrocities committed by the actual insurgents. He noted that the unpopularity of the Rhodesian regime resulting from its colonial and racist policies meant that accusations made against the unit were widely believed. Michael Evans observed in 2007 that the Selous Scouts "became rogue elements, as guilty of illegal activities as the very guerrillas they were fighting" and "significant numbers" of the unit "became implicated in activities that included torture, field executions, political assassination, kidnapping and the use of chemical warfare". Mpho G. Molomo described the Selous Scouts in 2009 as "a terrorist unit within the Rhodesian security forces". Piers Brendon wrote in 2010 that "the Selous Scouts committed the worst atrocities" of any Rhodesian unit. Ian Martinez has written that the Selous Scout's killings of prisoners and use of chemical and biological weapons were war crimes.

The head of the CIO, Ken Flower, wrote in his memoirs that encouraging the establishment of the Selous Scouts was "the worst mistake I made in the conduct of the war". Flower argued that Reid-Daly proved an unsuitable commander, the unit grew too large to be effective and it had been a mistake for it to have been allowed to participate in external operations. He also claimed that the Scouts' personnel included "vainglorious extroverts and a few psychopathic killers" and it was the "only Rhodesian unit to be disbanded with obloquy".

== Legacy ==
Following the dissolution of the Selous Scouts in 1980, most of its white soldiers emigrated to South Africa and were integrated into the South African Special Forces and the South African Police's special units. This formed part of an effort by the SADF to recruit white veterans of Rhodesian counter-insurgency units that was designated Operation Winter. Reid-Daly was among the Selous Scouts who moved to South Africa, and was appointed the head of Transkei Defence Force (the military of the nominally independent 'bantustan' of Transkei) in the early 1980s. He recruited other former Selous Scouts to train the force, but was forced to resign in 1987 after Transkei's rulers were overthrown by a military officer who had previously been trained by the Selous Scouts.

The former Selous Scouts contributed to the adoption by the South African security forces of the unit's ruthless tactics. For instance, former Selous Scouts comprised most of the initial personnel of the South African Koevoet unit, and it used similar tactics. This unit was responsible for many human rights violations. The South African Police's Vlakplaas paramilitary hit squad that was established in 1979 was also inspired by the Selous Scouts, as was the Civil Cooperation Bureau that was formed in 1986. Following the end of the Apartheid regime in South Africa some former Selous Scouts joined private military companies.

Reid-Daly's memoirs Selous Scouts: Top Secret War, which were first published in 1982, have had a strong influence on the historiography of the Rhodesian Bush War. It was among the first such works to be published, and was followed by many books by white veterans of the war. The book has been widely cited, with historians and commentators arguing that it clearly illustrated the tactics used by the Rhodesians. It does not mention any of the atrocities committed by the Selous Scouts. Many other books have since been published about the Selous Scouts. These works often glorify the unit.

In 2018 The New York Times reported that glorification of the Selous Scouts formed part of online nostalgia for Rhodesia and had been taken up by far-right movements that were sympathetic to the white Rhodesian regime. Items branded with the slogan and insignia of the Selous Scouts were available for sale, and a company called the "Selous Armory" was selling a range of apparel glorifying the Rhodesian military. In 2021, the newly established Ranger Regiment in the British Army adopted a cap badge that was similar in appearance to the Selous Scouts' and may have been based on it. The Telegraph reported that "numerous officers have raised concerns" over the badge. The British Army stated that the badge was "designed around the peregrine falcon" and not the osprey as used by the Rhodesian badge.

== See also ==
- Special forces of Rhodesia
- 1 Psychological Operations Unit
- 32 Battalion (South Africa)
- Flechas
- UR-416
