= Operation Winter =

Operation Winter may refer to:

- Operation Winter (1920), joint Polish and Latvian operation against the Red Army, culminating in the Battle of Daugavpils
- Operation Winter (South Africa), an effort made by the South African Defence Force to recruit white members of Rhodesian counter-insurgency units following the country's transition to Zimbabwe in 1980
- Operation Winter '94, battle of the Bosnian War and the Croatian War of Independence
