= Operation Hectic =

Rhodesian assassination plan against Robert Mugabe

- Part of the Rhodesian Bush War
- Type: Coup d'état/Decapitation strike
- Commanded by: (Rhodesia) Rhodesian SAS
- Target: Robert Mugabe
- Objective: Assassination of Robert Mugabe and ZANU leadership
- Date: 14 February 1980
- Outcome: Cancelled

Operation Hectic was a planned operation to be conducted by the Rhodesian Security Forces. The plan was designed as an underpinning operation to Operation Quartz. The plan was intended to be used to assassinate Robert Mugabe and other high ranking ZANU leaders at their headquarters. The operation was cancelled three hours before it was due to start.

== Background ==
Rhodesia had unilaterally declared independence from the British Empire under white minority rule. ZANU engaged in armed guerilla warfare against the Rhodesian government in the Rhodesian Bush War. Following the Lancaster House Agreement, Rhodesia returned to British control in 1979 as Southern Rhodesia so that free elections could be held under universal suffrage. During that time, Mugabe had survived a number of assassination attempts. The Rhodesian Security Forces came up with Operation Hectic as a backup plan in case ZANU lost the election and returned to guerrilla warfare. Both ZIPRA and ZANLA forces had been required to gather at designated points as part of the Agreement.

== Plan ==
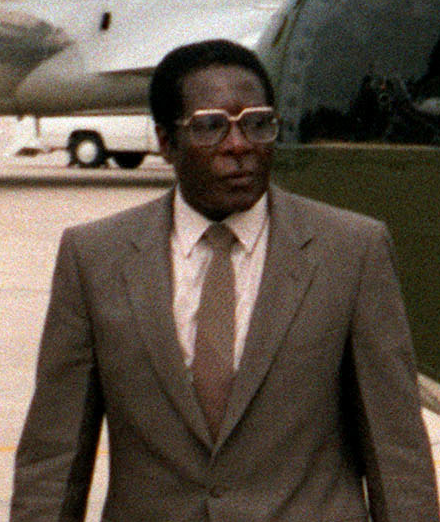
Mugabe, the target of the operation

The plan for Operation Hectic involved the Rhodesian SAS taking four of the Rhodesian Armoured Corps' T-55 tanks to the Audio Visual Arts building of the University of Rhodesia in Salisbury to eliminate Mugabe and the ZANU leaders in case they lost the election. The Rhodesian forces would be backed up by South African Special Forces and South African Air Force helicopters. The plan would be justified on the grounds of false reports of ZANU guerillas attacking churches. It was scheduled to operate alongside Operation Quartz carried out by the Rhodesian Light Infantry and Selous Scouts. However, as a distinctive plan, it was not planned in as much detail as Quartz was and details were thin due to disputes about it within Combined Operations. The operations would have been initiated by the passing of the codeword "Quartz". However the Operation was called off three hours before it was due to start due to Mugabe winning the election.
