= Operation Long John =

- Part of Rhodesian Bush War
- Operation Long John (Mozambique)
Date	25–26 June 1976
Location	Mapai, Chicualacuala, People's Republic of Mozambique
Result	Rhodesian victory

Belligerents
Rhodesia	ZANLA

Commanders and leaders
(Rhodesia) Ian Smith; Lt. Col Ronald Reid-Daly	Unknown

Units involved
Rhodesian Army: Selous Scouts; RhAF	Unknown

Strength
55 scouts 8 vehicles	90+ cadres

Casualties and losses
1 killed 1 wounded	19 killed 18 wounded Total: 37

Operation Long John was an operation undertaken by the Selous Scouts of the Rhodesian Army on 25 June 1976 against two ZANLA guerrilla bases located in Mozambique near Mapai. Operation Long John was an attack on a guerrilla transit camp at Mapai and staging post identified as Chicualacuala.

The plan of the operations would involve the first use of a tactic by the Rhodesian Security Forces that would become known as the "Flying-Column Attack". The transit camp was located approximately 60 kilometres inside Mozambique.

It was necessary to introduce a reconnaissance force into the area in order to determine the exact location and size of the camp. It was confirmed that approximately 90 ZANLA insurgents were staged at Chicualacuala, and a large ZANLA arsenal was located at Mapai. The confirmation of an arsenal" meant that the attacking force would come in contact with FRELIMO soldiers of Mozambique.

The new government of Mozambique was willing to provide sanctuary for the Patriotic Front insurgents, but they would not allow them to travel throughout the countryside in armed groups. Their weapons were maintained and guarded by FRELIMO soldiers, and issued immediately prior to their infiltration into Rhodesia.

The plan involved a mechanised assault across the border utilising armoured cars, trucks, and several buses. The attack would bypass Chicualacuala, and strike directly at Mapai. The former would be eliminated on the return trip.
