= Operation Winter (South Africa) =

Operation by South African Defence Force

- Part of the South African Border War
- Commanded by: Fritz Loots
- Objective: Recruitment of former members of the Rhodesian Security Forces by South Africa
- Date: 1980
- Executed by: South African Defence Force
- Outcome: South African success

Operation Winter was an initiative undertaken by the South African Defence Force (SADF) to recruit white members of the former Rhodesian Security Forces in 1980 after that country transitioned to majority rule as Zimbabwe. It contributed to large numbers of Rhodesian veterans moving to South Africa.

== Preparations ==
South Africa was one of the few countries to provide support for Rhodesia following the white minority government's Unilateral Declaration of Independence in November 1965. During the Rhodesian Bush War the South African government funded much of Rhodesia's counter-insurgency effort and sent thousands of SADF and South African Police personnel to fight with the Rhodesian forces.

South Africa developed plans for Rhodesian special forces personnel to be absorbed into the SADF well before the end of the Rhodesian Bush War. It is not known when South Africa first approached the Rhodesian government on this issue, but the historian Louis Bester has written that this must have been in 1977 or 1978. In the late 1970s the commander of the South African Special Forces, Major General Fritz Loots, approved the construction of new barracks at Durban and Phalaborwa to accommodate former Rhodesian special forces personnel. These facilities were almost complete by the time the Bush War ended.

== Transfer of Rhodesians to South Africa ==
Ahead of the transition to black majority rule in what was to become Zimbabwe, the SADF initiated a program to recruit mainly white members of the Rhodesian counter-insurgency units that was designated Operation Winter. This was led by Loots. Loots travelled to Rhodesia shortly before the transition to recruit Rhodesian special forces and intelligence personnel. Members of the Rhodesian Special Air Service Regiment received offers from the SADF in November and December 1979.

There have been allegations that the British and United States governments provided support for Operation Winter, and American transport aircraft may have carried Rhodesian personnel to South Africa. The British Special Air Service and representatives from British security companies approached some Rhodesian SAS personnel. The Israel Defence Force was also interested in recruiting Rhodesian SAS personnel but none came across due to the differing languages and environment.

In July 1980 the Zimbabwean government expelled all South African diplomats from the country due to concerns that the diplomatic mission in the Zimbabwean capital Salisbury was being used to recruit "mercenaries". South Africa was encouraged to retain a trade office in Zimbabwe, however. The South African government denied that it was trying to recruit Zimbabwean military personnel.

== Ex-Rhodesians in South Africa ==
Around 5,000 Rhodesians joined the SADF. Large quantities of weapons, ammunition and other equipment were also transferred to South Africa. Some of the ex-Rhodesian personnel were used as part of an effort to destabilise the new Zimbabwean government that was designated Operation Drama. Much of the Rhodesian Special Air Service became part of the South African 1 and 6 Reconnaissance Regiments, and many members of the disbanded Selous Scouts formed part of 5 Reconnaissance Regiment. 5 Reconnaissance Regiment took part in efforts to undermine the government of Mozambique. Rhodesians were also posted to 32 Battalion. Many of the Rhodesians who had joined the SADF left it during 1983.

Former members of the Rhodesian Selous Scouts made up most of the initial personnel for the South West African Police's Koevoet counter-insurgency unit, and it used similar brutal tactics.

Personnel who had worked on the Rhodesian chemical and biological weapons program (which had been supported by the South African government) were among those who relocated to South Africa as part of Operation Winter. This contributed to the use of chemical weapons by the South African security forces in what was designated Project Coast.

Overall, the influx of Rhodesians to South Africa under Operation Winter considerably augmented the SADF and South African Police's counter-insurgency expertise.
