= 1 Psychological Operations Unit =

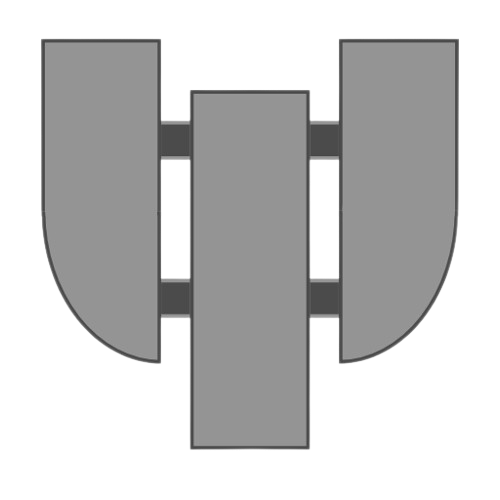
- The distinctive unit insignia of the PsyAc, a stylized version of the Greek letter Psi.
- Active: 1 July 1977–1980
- Country: Rhodesia
- Branch: Rhodesian Army
- Type: Infantry
- Role: Psychological operations Unconventional warfare
- Garrison/HQ: Cranborne Barracks, Salisbury
- Nicknames: “Sensor” “PsyAc”
- Mottos: Tiri Tose (Shona for "We Are Together")
- Colors: Sky blue and royal blue
- Engagements: Rhodesian Bush War

Commanders
- Commander: Major Tony Dalton

The 1 Psychological Operations Unit (1POU), also called the Psychological Action Unit (PsyAc or Psyac), was the psychological warfare branch of the Rhodesian Army. The unit was formed in 1977 and was active during the Rhodesian Bush War, during which it worked to counter ZANLA and ZIPRA activities.

Facing what was perceived as dwindling public support for the war, the 1POU was tasked with eliminating rural guerrillas and “terrorists”, purportedly to protect the populace and therefore win their support. Subsequently, the 1POU distributed propaganda (airborne leaflet drops), encouraged enemy defections, and assisted the Central Intelligence Organisation in covertly sabotaging supply lines.

== History ==
In the mid–1970s, rebel forces had largely infiltrated most aspects of rural civilian life. According to Sergeant Nick Daws, formerly of the unit, there was a “belated recognition” that conventional military tactics would not be enough to win the war in its evolved state; instead, civil infiltration and propaganda campaigns would be required.

Following two years of unspecified actions under the provisional names of “Sensor” and “Psyac”, the Rhodesian Army’s psychological branch was finally designated as such on 1 July 1977. Organizationally under the Infantry Branch and headquartered at Old Cranborne Barracks in Salisbury, the new ‘1 Psychological Operations Unit’ was under the command of Captain (later Major) Tony Dalton. The new detachment was given its own printmaking supplies, and began to produce and distribute anti-communist flyers and leaflets.

It has been alleged that near the end of the conflict Rhodesian PsyOp planners used Anthrax to kill and injure civilian farmers’ cattle, before blaming it on ‘contamination’ from diseased guerrillas (who were presumably hiding in the communities). It has been claimed that this was part of a broader campaign “to alienate the local population from the insurgents”. A 2025 article by an American emergency medicine specialist concluded that the Anthrax outbreak was likely the result of natural causes and the disruption caused by the war rather than a bioweapon.

== Uniforms and symbolism ==
=== Uniforms ===
Members of the 1POU wore standard Brushstroke–patterned combat uniforms, complete with a blue colored beret and a stable belt of descending royal blue, white, and sky blue. Both uniform items featured the unit metal insignia.

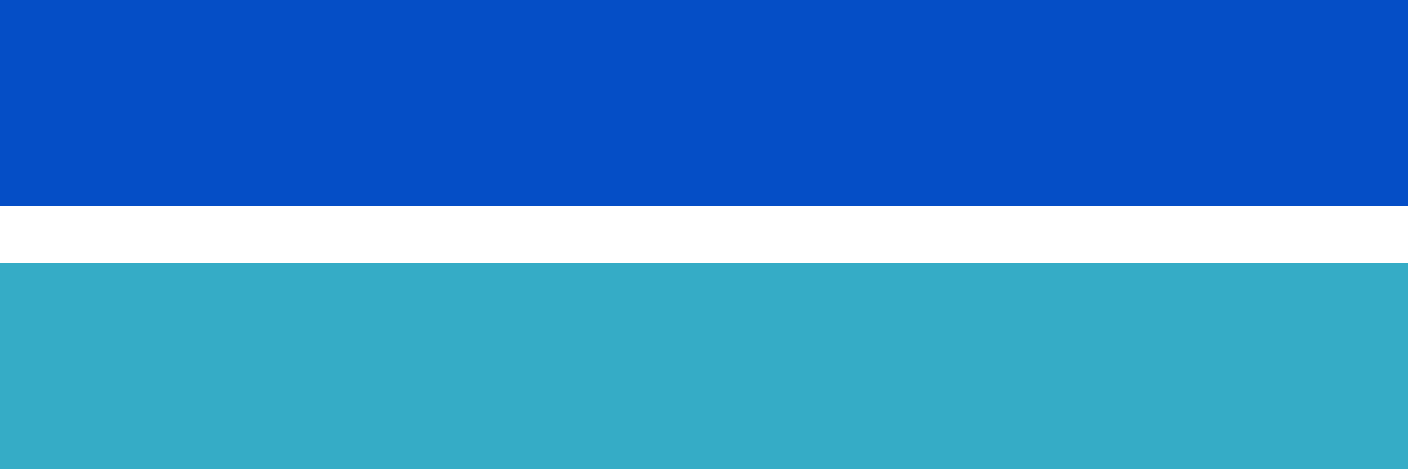
Stable belt of the 1POU

=== Symbolism ===
The unit’s distinctive metal insignia was a modernized version of the Greek letter Psi. The letter was intended to represent psychology as a whole, itself being the root of the prefix ‘–psycho’ (something of the mind), and the unit color of blue was chosen for being supposedly “accepted and liked by the average African.” The motto, Tiri Tose, is of the Shona language, and means “we are together”.

== See also ==
- Propaganda in the Rhodesian Bush War
- Selous Scouts
