= Operation Eland =

1976 Rhodesian raid into Mozambique

- Part of the Rhodesian Bush War
- Operation Eland (Mozambique)
Date	9 August 1976
Location	Nyadzonya, (Note: Also spelt "Nyadzonia" in some texts) Mozambique 18.5326°S 33.3883°E
Result	Rhodesian victory

Belligerents
Rhodesia	ZANLA (ZANU) FRELIMO

Commanders and leaders
(Rhodesia) Ron Reid-Daly (Rhodesia) Rob Warraker (Rhodesia) Morrison Nyathi	Josiah Tongogara; Robert Mugabe; Edgar Tekere

Units involved
Rhodesian Army: Selous Scouts	ZANU guerillas and 604 refugees (Per ZANU)

Strength
84 scouts 4 Ferret armoured cars	Unarmed refugees 5,000 ZANU troops (per Rhodesia)

Casualties and losses
None	Nearly 1,000 killed, mostly unarmed refugees (Per Amnesty International and ZANU); 1,028 guerillas killed (Per Rhodesia)

Operation Eland, also known as the Nyadzonya Raid, was a military operation carried out by the Rhodesian Selous Scouts at Nyadzonya in Mozambique on 9 August 1976.

The attack was one of many cross-border raids conducted by Rhodesia against Mozambique and was perpetrated in direct contravention to United Nations Security Council Resolution 386, passed unanimously in March 1976, which condemned Rhodesia's previous attacks on Mozambican territory. The Selous Scouts, wearing FRELIMO uniforms, infiltrated a camp run by FRELIMO and ZANU before opening fire. Impersonation of opposing forces is classified as a war crime according to the Geneva convention. In a 1993 report, Amnesty International described the raid as "gross human rights violation and a war crime." Roughly 1,000 people were killed of which the exact number of civilians is unknown. ZANU stated that they were overwhelmingly unarmed refugees while Rhodesia said they were guerillas or undergoing training. Following the attack, ZANU intensified its guerilla campaign, and FRELIMO increased its support for border infiltrations by ZANU into Rhodesia.

The raid had severe political and diplomatic consequences for Rhodesia. The United Nations Security Council condemned the attack with the unanimous passing of United Nations Security Council Resolution 411. Many governments worldwide also condemned the attack, including the government of Apartheid South Africa which ended its covert military assistance to Rhodesia, reduced the supply of oil and munitions, and began to pressure the Rhodesian government to accept a transition to black majority rule. Rhodesian Prime Minister Ian Smith publicly agreed (in principle) to this a little over a month after Operation Eland, on 24 September 1976.

== Background ==
Throughout June and July 1976, the Rhodesian government believed it had identified a major ZANLA staging and training camp located in Mozambique, identified as the Nyadzonya Base. This camp appeared to be the main insurgent and logistics base for operations conducted in the THRASHER operational area. Both aerial reconnaissance and captured guerrillas had confirmed that the camp contained a large hospital, and approximately 5,000 people, including ZANLA personnel or recruits in training.

This was the largest center of insurgent activity discovered up to this point in the war, and so a combined force was organised that included members of the RLI, RAC, SAS, Selous Scouts, and members selected from the Territorial Units.

The historians Paul L. Moorcraft and Peter McLaughlin wrote in 1982 that "although the camp did contain trained guerrillas and young recruits, many of its inhabitants were old people, women and young children who had fled from Rhodesia as refugees". They further wrote in 2008 that "although nearly all the personnel in the camp were unarmed, many were trained guerillas or undergoing instruction"

A 1994 Amnesty International publication stated that the camp at Nyadzonya housed refugees, and that a soldier who participated in the raid later stated: "We were told that Nyadzonia was a camp containing several thousand unarmed refugees who could be recruited to join the guerrillas. It would be easier if we went in and wiped them out while they were unarmed and before they were trained rather than waiting for the possibility of them being trained and sent back armed into Rhodesia".

The success of the "Flying-Column Attack" during the Mapai raid served as the basis for the tactics devised for a strike against the ZANLA forces at Nyadzonya. Once again, air support would be provided for serious medevacs on the objectives, and close air support would be available in the event of a dire emergency. The planning included a table model of the camp and its surroundings. Captured insurgents provided information concerning the defenses, positions of the armories, hospital, living quarters, the daily routine, and a general outline of the escape drills of the ZANLA insurgents.

The "Flying-Column" consisted of 14 vehicles and 85 men. There were only two types of vehicles on the operation: 10 Unimog and 4 Ferret armoured cars. The transport vehicles were armed with a wide assortment of weapons: 20mm aircraft cannons, medium and light machine guns, and a captured Soviet 12.7 mm heavy machine gun.

The men were dressed in captured Mozambique FRELIMO uniforms with their distinctive caps. The white members of the force wore black ski-masks. The vehicles were painted using the FRELIMO colors, and Rhodesian Intelligence had provided genuine FRELIMO registration numbers for the vehicle license plates.

== Operation ==
On 5 August 1976, a group of 60 ZANLA guerrillas entered Rhodesia from Mozambique and attacked a military base at Ruda, near Umtali. Four days later, guerrillas killed four soldiers in a mortar attack, and another died in a follow-up operation. The local white population demanded that action be taken.

Operation Eland was hatched, and involved a cross-border raid by 84 Selous Scouts under Captain Rob Warraker against a concentration of guerrillas located at a training camp on the Nyadzonya River, 40 kilometres (25 mi) away in Mozambique. The attacking column consisted of four Ferret armoured cars and seven armoured Unimogs, two of which were armed with 20mm Hispano cannons scavenged from obsolete aircraft. The vehicles were disguised to make them look like they belonged to FRELIMO, while the men, including many blacks, disguised themselves in FRELIMO uniforms. Amongst the soldiers was a turned former ZANLA commander by the name of Morrison Nyathi, who led the attackers to the camp.

The attacking party, led by Nyathi, was able to bluff its way past the gate guards and drive into the very heart of the camp. Nyathi blew a whistle, which was the emergency signal for the guerrillas to muster on the parade ground. The Rhodesian forces then killed large numbers of people in the camp. According to Moorcraft and McLaughlin, the camp was a ZANLA-run refugees base containing 5,000 people that also doubled as a training center.

The bridge over the Pungwe River was a key strategic point that the assault team had to fight their way through on their return journey to Rhodesia. The bridge was successfully assaulted, and then charges laid under enemy fire to destroy it, and thereby to cover the escape. As they laid the charges under the bridge, they fired at an approaching car, killing a Catholic priest and a boy, while badly injuring a Cluny sister and the vicar-general of the Diocese of Tete, Father Domingos Ferrão.

== Aftermath ==
ZANLA and Amnesty International claimed that the base was a refugee camp, and that the assault was the worst atrocity of the war. The head of the Selous Scouts claimed that captured ZANLA documents revealed that the people killed in the raid were either trained guerrillas or were undergoing guerrilla instruction and training. They claimed that 1,028 people were killed. The leader of the assault, Rob Warraker, was killed in action in Malvérnia in January 1977, while Morrison Nyathi was later captured and executed by ZANLA guerrillas in 1979 for treason.

A 1994 Amnesty International publication described the operation as a massacre and stated that the camp at Nyadzonya housed refugees, and that a soldier who participated in the raid later stated: "We were told that Nyadzonia was a camp containing several thousand unarmed refugees who could be recruited to join the guerrillas. It would be easier if we went in and wiped them out while they were unarmed and before they were trained rather than waiting for the possibility of them being trained and sent back armed into Rhodesia". According to Amnesty International, nearly 1,000 people were killed and the operation was "a gross human rights violation and a war crime".

Operation Eland led to an important breach between the Rhodesian and South African governments. The South African Prime Minister John Vorster had warned his Rhodesian counterpart Ian Smith against expanding the conflict. Vorster had not been notified about Operation Eland, and reacted by withdrawing the military support that his government was providing to Rhodesia covertly through Operation Polo. This led to the loss of half the Rhodesian Air Force's helicopter pilots as well as maintenance personnel and liaison officers. Vorster also reduced the supply of oil and munitions to Rhodesia and his foreign minister announced that South Africa would now support a transition to black majority rule in Rhodesia. In response to this pressure, Smith announced on 24 September 1976 that he now agreed to the principle of majority rule, but did not define what he meant by this.

== See also ==
- Battle of Cassinga
- Operation Dingo
