= Propaganda in the Rhodesian Bush War =

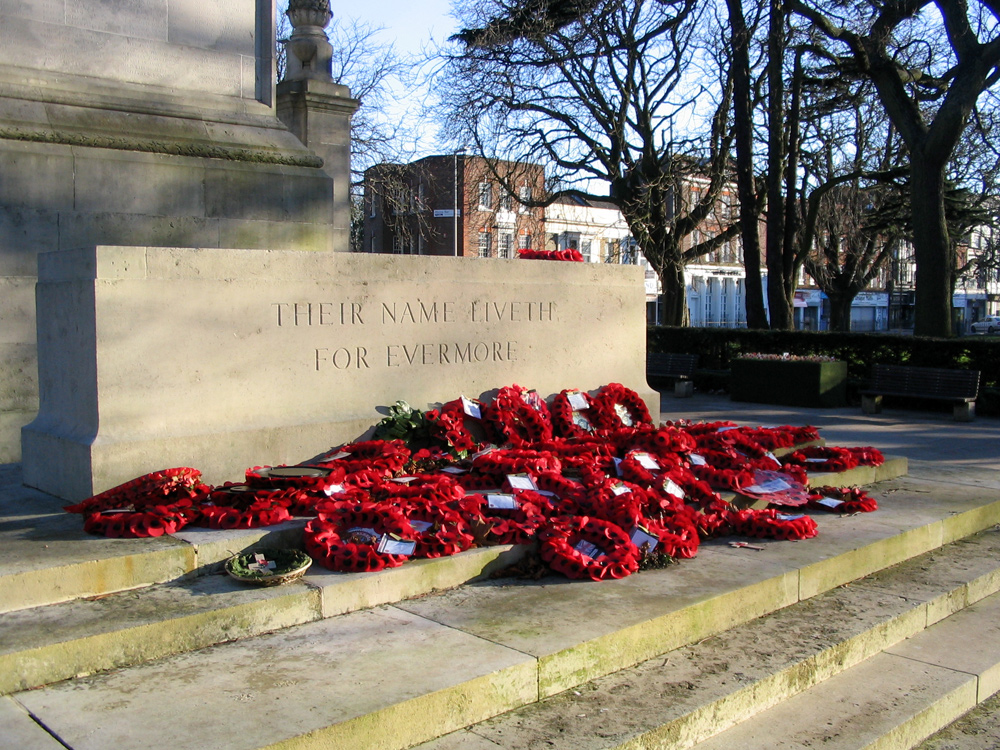
Poppies lain before the Cenotaph in Southampton, England. Rhodesian propaganda efforts targeting Britain often used such symbolism to stress Rhodesia's contribution on Britain's side during the two World Wars, and accuse the British government of betrayal.

During the Rhodesian Bush War, informational and political warfare was mounted by each of the involved factions: on one side, the Rhodesian government (led by Prime Minister Ian Smith of the Rhodesian Front); on another, the British government and the Commonwealth of Nations; on a third, the Zimbabwe African National Union (ZANU) and its associated guerrilla army, the Zimbabwe African National Liberation Army (ZANLA); and, on a fourth, the Zimbabwe African People's Union (ZAPU) and its armed wing, the Zimbabwe People's Revolutionary Army (ZIPRA).

Beginning in 1965, the Rhodesian government implemented a coordinated strategic information and public diplomacy campaign, which included propaganda, censorship, and psychological operations, aiming to maintain the support of the country's black majority in the face of infiltration and indoctrination of ZANLA and ZIPRA, as well as to appeal to the common British populace, which the Rhodesians hoped would begin to question British government policy regarding Rhodesia.

== Information operations ==
=== Rhodesian propaganda efforts in the West ===
The Rhodesian government initiated white propaganda efforts—that is, propaganda which truthfully states its origin—in October 1965, with the publishing and dissemination of a pamphlet titled Rhodesia's Case for Independence, which was distributed within Rhodesia and exported to Britain. Rhodesia's Case for Independence was intended to counter the Whitehall claim that Rhodesia's government lacked legitimacy for independence under Britain's recently adopted no independence before majority rule policy. British readers were asked to "support Rhodesians in their hour of need." When Rhodesia issued its Unilateral Declaration of Independence a month later, the very timing of the declaration was intended as propaganda: not only was the document signed on 11 November (Armistice Day), but the official telegram to London was wired at precisely 13:00 Salisbury time – 11:00 in London, the exact moment on Armistice Day when Britain begins the traditional two minutes' silence to honour the dead of the First and Second World Wars.

Specially printed air-letters were distributed to households in areas with high European-connected populations throughout Rhodesia, which they could post to friends and contacts abroad. The air-letters would include a pre-printed message in support of the Rhodesian government with space for the sender to include a personal note. Leaflets were prepared alleging that the British Government and British Broadcasting Corporation (BBC) were involved in subversive broadcasts to Rhodesia through Zambian radio waves. A number of patriotic organisations including the Rhodesian Front party and the Candour League were encouraged to write to friends overseas and explain Rhodesia's position.

In February 1966, the Rhodesian government expanded its efforts to the United States. They opened the Rhodesian Information Office in Washington and began disseminating bumper stickers displaying the slogan "Support Rhodesia." When both the United Nations and the US government placed sanctions on Rhodesia, the Rhodesian Information Office continued to operate with support from front groups including "The Friends of Rhodesia" (a US-based lobby closely linked to the Rhodesian Information Office) and the "American Rhodesian Association" (a US-based pro-internal settlement force supported by the political right).

The RF also engaged in black propaganda efforts. Pamphlets purported to come from the "Tudor Rose Society for the Protection of the British Way of Life" (which was later found non-existent) but in fact prepared by the Rhodesians, were posted in England to electors. Some Royal Air Force personnel in Zambia received copies of a circular letter purporting to come from an organisation called "the British Forces Friends of Rhodesia Association" and headed by a secret group of senior British officers. The letter warned against orders to go into action against "kith and kin in Rhodesia."

Some conservatives in the United States rallied to the cause of Rhodesia. In 1961, the American Committee for Aid to Katanga Freedom Fighters (ACAKFF) was formed to lobby the United States to recognize Katanga. The group was founded by Marvin Liebman and its president was Max Yergan. Its board of directors included some prominent conservatives such as Senator Everett Dirksen, William F. Buckley Jr., Senator James Eastland, George Schuyler, James Burnham, Taylor Caldwell, William A. Rusher, John Dos Passos and L. Brent Bozell Jr. Typical of the group's propaganda was a column by Burnham where he declared that what African nationalists want is "to destroy the power and privileges of the white men; to take over their property, or most of it; and to permit white men to remain only as servants and handmaids", causing him to declare his support for the state of Katanga, which was ruled by Moïse Tshombe and covertly supported by Belgium. The battle-lines formed by the issue of whether the United States should recognize Katanga repeated themselves with regard to Rhodesia with the same people who championed Katanga championing Rhodesia while the people opposed to Katanga as a 'sham' were also vehemently opposed to Rhodesia.

In 1966, the ACAKFF was reborn as the American African Association (AAAA) with both groups having Yergan as president or co-president, virtually identical letterheads, the same board of directors, the same mailing lists, and same address in New York—79 Madison Avenue—which was also the headquarters of Marvin Liebman Associates. At the same time it was revealed that the public relations firm of Marvin Liebman Associates had been hired by the Information Office of the Rhodesian government to try to improve Rhodesia's image in America. Even more extreme were groups such as the American Friends of Rhodesia founded by the far-right Liberty Lobby and John Birch Society which engaged in wildly racist propaganda that Kenneth Towsey, the head of the Information Office in New York thought did more harm than good. About groups such as the American Friends of Rhodesia, Towsey in a 1966 letter: "We have considered prudent to sup with them with a long spoon".

In June 1966, the Rhodesian Ministry of Information published a pamphlet Rhodesia in the Context of Africa saying: "The hopes and expectations of the [African] masses been dashed in tragedy after tragedy...One island of relative sanity remained in the richly endowed Katanga...But war was waged by the United Nations to destroy this secessionist or 'rebel' government....it is the fashion today to turn a blind eye on the Congo tragedy, and even to suggest that it is an exceptional case from which Europeans in Rhodesia should not draw unwarranted conclusions. Embarrassing though it may be, its lessons are there to be learned—by the world no less than Rhodesia". In Canada, the Friends of Rhodesia was founded by Gerald Hart and John Baldwin with a total membership of 200 people by 1966. Hart told Maclean's that he was not racist, but was for Rhodesia "because they are the same kind of people who helped build Canada. Why should they be driven out by a pack of savage aborigines just down from the trees? And no, I wouldn’t want my daughter to marry one. You’d bastardize both races."

In November 1966, the AAAA published an ad featuring a map of Africa in The New York Herald Tribune entitled "Sovereignty ... and Strife" listing all of the newly independent African nations which had experienced coups and civil wars in the last year, with the implication that to allow colour-blind voting in Rhodesia would be to invite chaos. A pamphlet issued by the AAAA from 1966 declared: "Should Rhodesia fail, all of Africa will suffer...Chaos would inundate order, and Africa would not fail to read the message that Western Civilization has abdicated". Another pro-Rhodesian group was the American Southern African Council headed by Lake High, a Southern political activist well known for his support of segregation in his native South Carolina. Much of the council's propaganda was blatantly racist such as one article featured in its magazine American Southern Africa Review in 1970 where it declared that "Americans suffering under the ravages of such outrageous legislation such as the Civil Rights (forced housing) act of 1968 can only look enviously at the Rhodesians". In 1968, the council endorsed George Wallace for president because of his statements that, if elected president, he would recognize Rhodesia and use Rhodesia as a model for solving America's "Negro problem".

=== Media censorship ===
As the Rhodesian government prepared for autonomy from Britain, it began to limit foreign communication. It started a weekly radio broadcast prepared by the Ministry of Information, the content of which was "selective and slanted reporting [that] attempted to build up a black picture of the independent African states to the north, combined with an image of Rhodesia, South Africa and the adjacent Portuguese territories as havens of good government and fair play." The Rhodesian Broadcasting Corporation, a statutory body, was subjected to close government control. By the end of 1964, Rhodesia Television, an independent commercial station, was taken over by the government.

=== British response ===
When the British became aware of the propaganda being mailed to their citizens from Rhodesia, they began a counter-campaign. The Rhodesia Political Department of the British Commonwealth Relations Office wrote a paper titled "Rhodesia: The Regime's Propaganda Machine and its Operations." The paper outlined how in May 1964, even before their official declaration of independence, the Rhodesian Government appointed a South African propaganda specialist named Ivor Benson. Benson became a special adviser within the Ministry of Information and it was his task to develop an effective propaganda machine.

== Political warfare in the Bush War ==
In early 1972 ZANLA, the military branch of the Zimbabwe African National Union (ZANU) led by Robert Mugabe and ZIPRA, the military branch of the Zimbabwe African People's Union (ZAPU) led by Joshua Nkomo, rose up against Smith's minority government. ZANLA and ZIPRA forces began infiltrating Rhodesia, committing acts of murder and terrorism against farmers. The Rhodesian Front received intelligence that ZANLA fighters were operating out of the Chiweshe Tribal Trust Area. Tribal trust areas were large tracts of land prescribed by law to be used and occupied exclusively by the black population of the area.

In response to the violence perpetuated by the ZANLA fighters in the Chiweshe Tribal Trust, the Rhodesian Front created protected villages. Smith's government attempted to relocate 45,000 people and their houses, belongings and livestock, but they were unable to mobilise. Protected villages quickly proved insufficient, forcing people to live without access to food (stores and grinding mills were closed), clean water, or toilets. Shelter was limited and as the cold season arrived, people continuously died from exposure. The Smith government asserted that these conditions were forced by the violence of the ZANLA forces, and that the lack of adequate accommodations was simply caused by their inability to build the infrastructure quickly enough.

ZANU and ZAPU announced a joint "Patriotic Front" and together began infiltrating Rhodesia, committing murder and acts of terrorism against Rhodesians, particularly in the protected villages, with many of the forces living in these protected village as a form of cover. The Rhodesia Ministry of Information claimed that ZANLA and ZIPRA violence escalated to include murder, rape, abduction, torture, beatings, robberies, and cattle-maimings. The subsequent civil war became known as the Rhodesian Bush War.

=== Restricted media ===
The Rhodesian government again employed tactics of censorship. Rhodesian cameras were banned from protected villages. At the same time, propaganda was being circulated to discourage Rhodesians from talking about conditions inside of the country. Brightly coloured stickers were distributed throughout the country and posted in restaurants and bars. They consisted of a series of slogans focused around self-censorship including:

"Your Tongue Could Pull a Trigger. Think about national security, don't talk about it." Others included "Women's Lib is One Thing, Women's Lip is Another," "What You've Said May Blow Up a Truck," and "An Open Mouth Makes a Big Target. Think about national security, don't talk about it."

=== Propaganda ===
In an effort to gain sympathy around the world, particularly the West, the Rhodesian Government published a series of booklets offering photographic evidence of the atrocities alleged to have been committed by Patriotic Front military forces. In March 1974, William F. Buckley Jr. traveled to Salisbury (modern Harare, Zimbabwe), where he interviewed Smith and expressed much sympathy for Rhodesia. Later, he was to denounce President Jimmy Carter's human rights policies, writing about Carter's "hectic concern for human rights in Rhodesia, practically defined as the transfer of power from an orderly white community to a disorderly black community". The American economist and academic Milton Friedman of the University of Chicago visited Rhodesia in 1976 on the invitation of the Information Office and upon his return to America stated he was "impressed by what I saw there". Friedman added that victory for the Patriotic Front guerrillas "would be a great prize for the Russians" and the end of Rhodesia as a white-ruled state would be the "suicide of the West".

=== Massacre of the Innocents ===
A pamphlet released by the Rhodesian Ministry of Information proclaims the strength of the security forces and the benefits of the protected villages. "Today, many thousands have taken grateful refuge in protected villages or live in communities protected by the security forces and the para-military wing of the Ministry of Internal Affairs." It states that the terrorists are scared of the government forces, and therefore are pursuing "soft targets". The piece goes on to reiterate criticism of the British government for not providing support. "Tragically, the villagers are dying in a war they do not want, waged to further a political creed they do not understand or care about."

=== "Red for Danger" ===
The Rhodesian Ministry of Information published a booklet titled "Red for Danger". Hundreds of thousands of copies were dispatched to many different countries and it ranked as a best seller. It identifies ZANU and ZAPU political parties as cover organisations for Communist expansion and was an attempt to elicit the help of Western countries actively pursuing containment. The book drew parallels between the Chinese push for Communism in Vietnam, their success in other African countries, and their pursuit of the same goal in Rhodesia through monetary support and training of the ZANU terrorist forces. "The terrorists who have recently been shot or captured in Rhodesia were all thoroughly indoctrinated with the communist ideology. They carried the literature of Mao Tse Tung and more important, they were armed with modern automatic rifles and machine guns of communist manufacture as well as explosives, grenades and powerful bazookas. In fact, recent Australian visitors have been surprised to find that the weapons being used against Rhodesia are of the same pattern as those being used against Australians, New Zealanders and Americans in Vietnam." To make the case for Western involvement, the booklet continues: "Should Rhodesia, Mozambique and Angola succumb to communist domination, the southern coast of Africa would follow and the lifeline between the Western powers and the Far East would be cut."

=== "Anatomy of Terror" ===
"Anatomy of Terror" was a booklet published by the Rhodesian Ministry of Information in January 1974. It was circulated internationally by the Rhodesian information office and documented the atrocities of the African guerrilla armies.

== Psychological operations ==
=== Propaganda: Operation Split-Shot ===
As the war progressed and the Rhodesian government's control diminished, the 1st Psychological Operations Unit of the RSF implemented "Operation Split-Shot." Leaflets were distributed to engender fear among the Rhodesian population. The campaign was focused around the theme of "Terror and death is the way of the communist terrorists in Rhodesia." Leaflets depicted ZANLA/ZIPRA recruiters forcing black Rhodesians into training camps, raping women in front of their children, spreading sexually transmitted diseases, and killing defenceless civilians. These leaflets also depicted military recruits being mistreated and killed by opposition forces.

Propaganda efforts backfired when Rhodesians who voluntarily joined the opposition forces returned to their villages unharmed. According to senior members of the 1st Psychological Operations Unit, the unit was creating their propaganda based on false intelligence. The Rhodesians began to realise that the information presented in the leaflets was false and therefore began to mistrust their government.

As a final effort, PSYOP forces resorted to reporting messages from the spirits to gain credibility with rural tribes. "Mhondoro, your tribal spirit, has sent a message to say that your ancestral spirits are very dissatisfied with you. As a result of this, there has been no rain, your crops have died and there could be great famine. It is only the Government which can help you, but you have to realize your obligation to help the government also." Efforts were unsuccessful, as the source of the propaganda had already lost all credibility.
