= Rhodesia and weapons of mass destruction =

Although many other countries have possessed chemical and biological weapons programs, Rhodesia was one of the few countries known to have used chemical and biological agents. Rhodesian CBW use took place toward the end of Rhodesia's protracted struggle against a growing African nationalist insurgency in the late 1970s. The genesis of the Rhodesian CBW effort emerged as a result of a deteriorating security situation that developed following Mozambique's independence from Portuguese colonial rule. In April 1980, the former colony became the independent country of Zimbabwe.

== Origins ==
The project was the brainchild of Robert Symington, who headed the clinical program at the University of Rhodesia's medical school (Godfrey Huggins School of Medicine). He reportedly put forward the idea to the Minister of Defence P. K. van der Byl, who advocated it to Prime Minister Ian Smith. The Prime Minister in consultation with his War Cabinet—delegated responsibility to the Central Intelligence Organisation (CIO), and implementation was assigned to the Special Branch liaison component in the Selous Scouts. Although they were aware of the CBW program's existence, the full extent to which the Rhodesian political and military leadership was involved is unclear due to the lack of documented material or living witnesses.

Given Defence Minister P. K. van der Byl's key role in the CBW initiative, Rhodesia's CBW efforts almost certainly began before van der Byl was removed from his defence portfolio on 9 September 1976. Symington's proposal for a chemical and biological weapons programme then probably dates from mid-to-late 1975 to early-to-mid 1976, but the exact date for the beginning of the CBW effort is unclear. Once authorized, Rhodesian CBW experiments at the Selous Scout "fort" in Bindura date from sometime in 1976, and operations almost certainly began by late 1976. By this time, Symington had recruited a number of volunteers from the University of Rhodesia to work on the project. According to members of the Rhodesian CBW team, they began to poison clothing in April 1977 and contaminate food, beverages, and medicines in May/June 1977. They also stated that the project did not end until late 1979.

CIO chief Ken Flower was certainly aware of the CBW activities, having received biweekly reports from his officer in charge of the program Michael "Mac" McGuinness. British South Africa Police (BSAP) commissioners, first Sherren and later Allum, all were briefed on the CBW efforts, and at least Sherren took steps to ensure that the program remained concealed. In 1977, McGuinness briefed the Combined Operations (COMOPS) commanded by Lt. General Peter Walls about the CBW effort.

== CBW program ==
Participants in the Rhodesian CBW program confirmed that a small-scale, rudimentary program existed, although many details probably will never be fully disclosed. The facilities used in the CBW program almost certainly consisted of a Special Branch-funded laboratory at Professor Robert Symington's Borrowdale residence, and facilities at the Selous Scout "fort" outside Bindura were used. Similarly, facilities in the Selous Scout "fort" outside Mount Darwin were involved in the CBW programme. Starting from sometime in 1978, some of the more sensitive CBW-related activities—including experimentation on humans—almost certainly took place at the Mount Darwin site, which was more remotely located than Bindura.

The chemicals most used in the Rhodesian programme were parathion (an organophosphate insecticide) and thallium (a heavy metal commonly found in rodenticide) probably because these compounds were readily available in Rhodesia at the time and were relatively inexpensive. Among the biological agents, the Rhodesians selected for use included Vibrio cholerae (causative agent of cholera) and possibly Bacillus anthracis (causative agent of anthrax). They also looked at using Rickettsia prowazekii (causative agent of epidemic typhus), and Salmonella typhi (causative agent of typhoid fever), and toxins—such as ricin and botulinum toxin.

== Purpose ==
Although little specific information remains available about the Rhodesian CBW effort, what is indisputable is that its primary purpose was to kill guerrillas whether they were recruits transiting to camps in Mozambique or guerrillas operating inside Rhodesia. The CBW effort took on the guerrilla threat from three fronts. First, the effort aimed to eliminate guerrillas operating inside Rhodesia through contaminated supplies either provided by contact men, recovered from hidden caches, or stolen from rural stores. A second-order effect was to disrupt the relations between village supporters and the guerrillas. Secondly, the effort worked to contaminate water supplies along guerrilla infiltration routes into Rhodesia, forcing the guerrillas either to travel through arid regions to carry more water and less ammunition or travel through areas patrolled by the security forces. Finally, the Rhodesians sought to hit the guerrillas in their safe havens by poisoning food, beverages, and medicines.

== Dissemination ==
The Special Branch also stocked contaminated goods in rural general stores in the frozen areas knowing that guerrilla groups likely would raid these stores. During Rhodesian external operations, Rhodesian forces often would add contaminated food and medical supplies to those discovered in those guerrilla camps overrun by Rhodesian troops. Similarly, guerrilla caches in the bush were replaced with contaminated supplies.

During 1976 members of the Selous Scouts disseminated V. cholerae in the Ruya River. The unit also used the material to contaminate the water supply of the town of Cochemane in Mozambique. Deaths from cholera occurred in both areas.

A number of writers have accused the Rhodesian Government of intentionally distributing B. anthracis in western Rhodesia, causing an anthrax outbreak in the country from 1978 to 1984 with 10,738 human cases and 200 fatalities. This is however disputed by others, including Wilson et al. who state that there is a lack of evidence to support this claim.

== Effectiveness ==
Some Rhodesian officers believed that the use of CBW could have been decisive, given its effectiveness at times during the war. At times in the conflict, the Rhodesian CBW effort resulted in more insurgent deaths than did conventional Rhodesian military units. The CBW program resulted in at least 809 recorded deaths, but the true count almost certainly was well over 1,000. In the end, CBW use in Rhodesia did not have any meaningful impact on the conflict's termination.
