= Operation Quartz =

Planned coup d'état in Zimbabwe

- Part of the Rhodesian Bush War
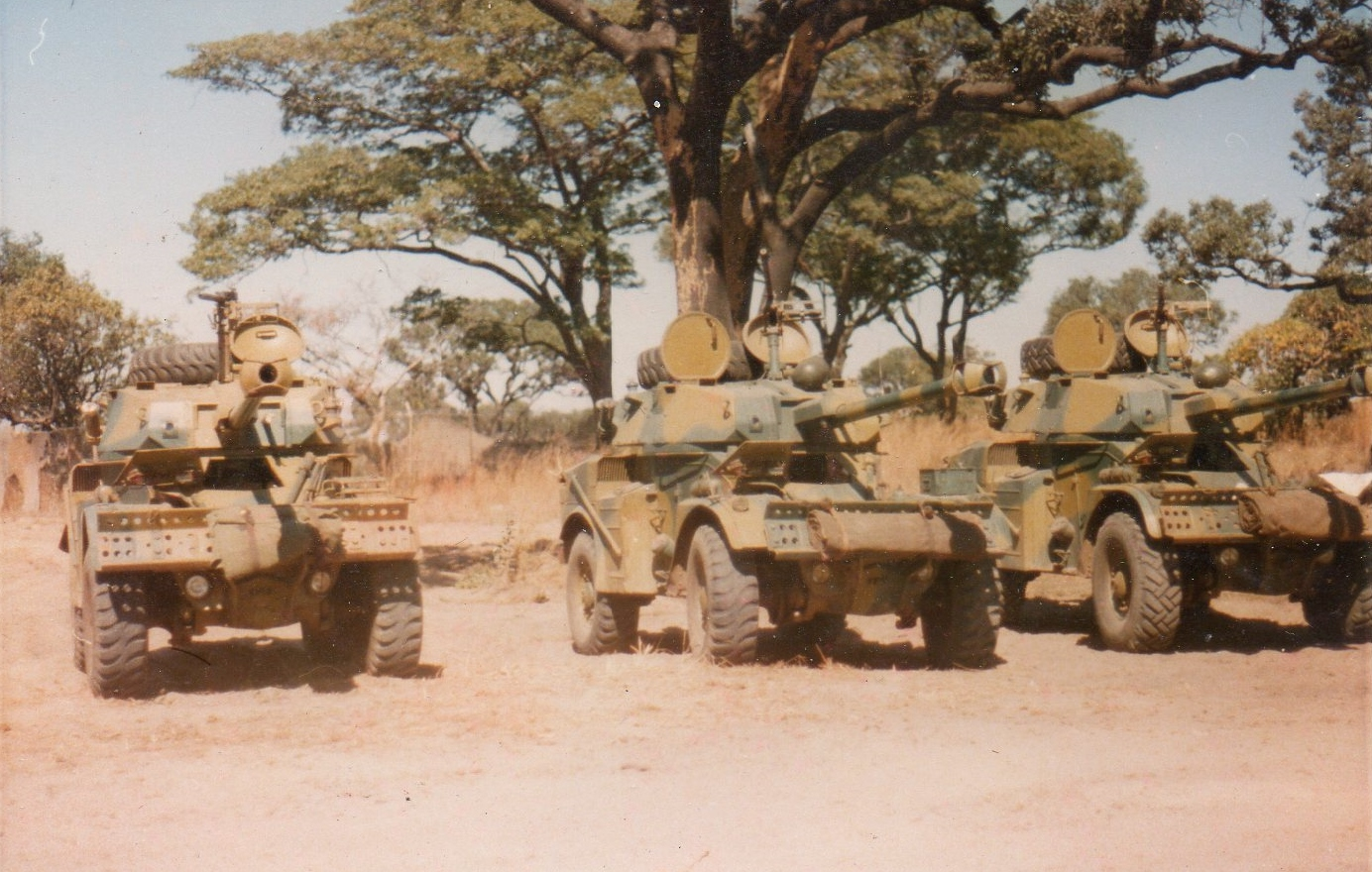
- Eland-90 armoured cars of the Rhodesian Armoured Corps
- Type: Coup d'état/Decapitation strike
- Commanded by: Peter Walls
- Objective: Assassination of ZANU-PF leadership, destruction of ZANLA
- Date: 14 February 1980
- Outcome: Cancelled

Operation Quartz was a planned military operation to be conducted by the Rhodesian Security Forces against Robert Mugabe and ZANU-PF in the event that party lost the Southern Rhodesian general election, 1980. The operation was organised on the assumption ZANU-PF would attempt to violently seize the government should it lose the election. ZANU-PF ultimately won the election and Operation Quartz was never executed.

== Planning ==
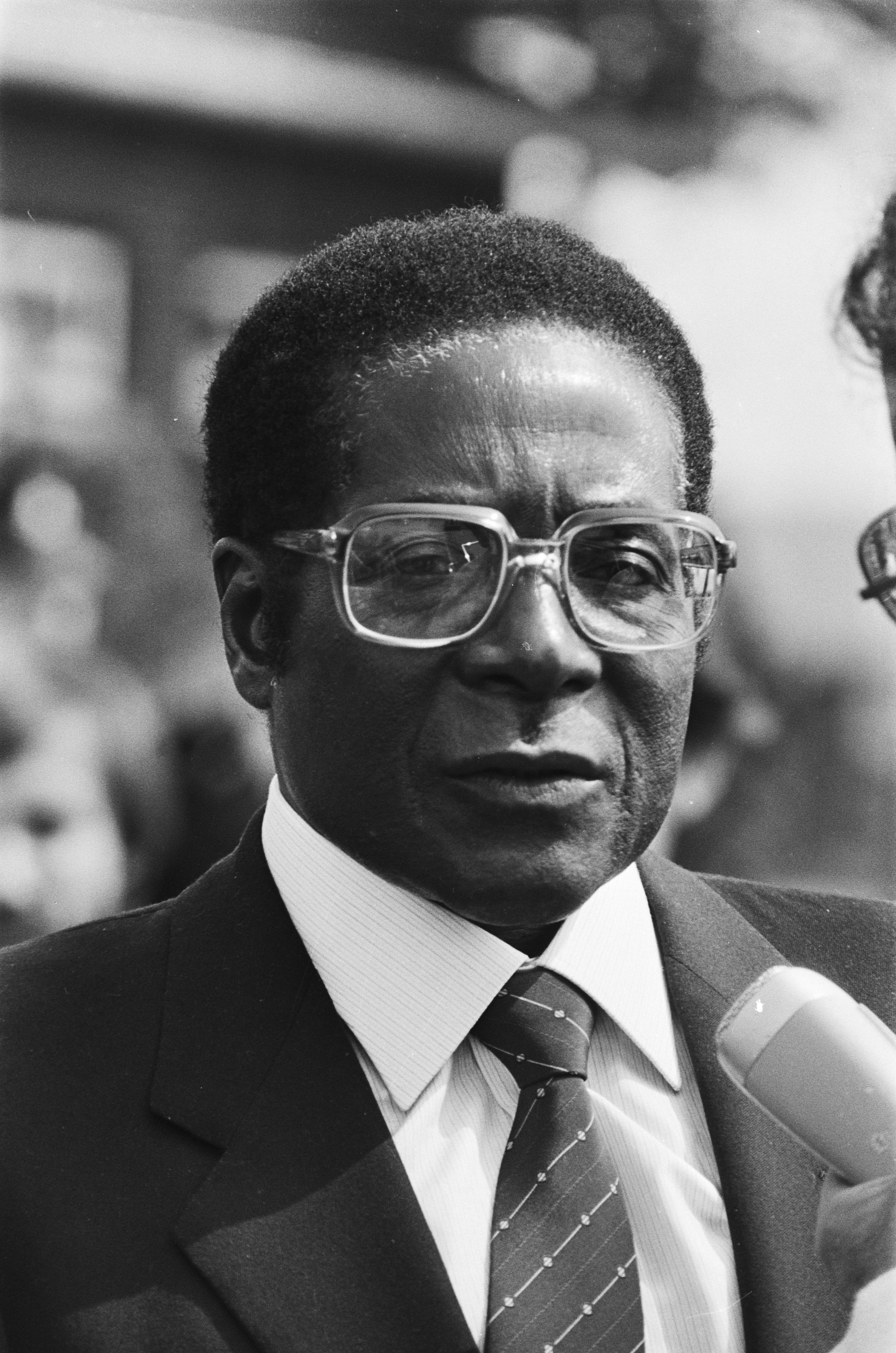
Robert Mugabe, pictured here in 1982, was one of the targets of Operation Quartz.

Operation Quartz had two elements. The first involved strikes against armed units of the Zimbabwe African National Liberation Army (ZANLA, ZANU-PF's military wing) that had concentrated at 11 assembly points prior to the election, to be carried out by Rhodesian infantry and armour units supported by the Rhodesian Air Force. The second element was Operation Hectic, which called for the simultaneous assassinations of Robert Mugabe, Rex Nhongo, and Simon Muzenda by the Rhodesian SAS.

In addition to the Rhodesian Army and Rhodesian Air Force, it is believed that the South African Armed Forces was planning a supporting role in Operation Quartz.

Some accounts of Operation Quartz have described it as a planned military coup against the extant government of Abel Muzorewa to prevent it from handing over power to Mugabe, alleging Peter Walls called off the operation three hours before H-Hour. The allegations may have originated in information leaked by the British government.

== Aftermath ==
The ZANU-PF won a majority of votes in the election and Operation Quartz was never executed. Following the ZANU-PF victory, details of Operation Quartz came to light and Walls, who had initially been retained by Mugabe as head of the armed forces, was accused in parliament of treason. On the advice of members of the government, Walls fled the country for his own safety.
