= List of automobile manufacturers of Sweden =

== Major current manufacturers ==
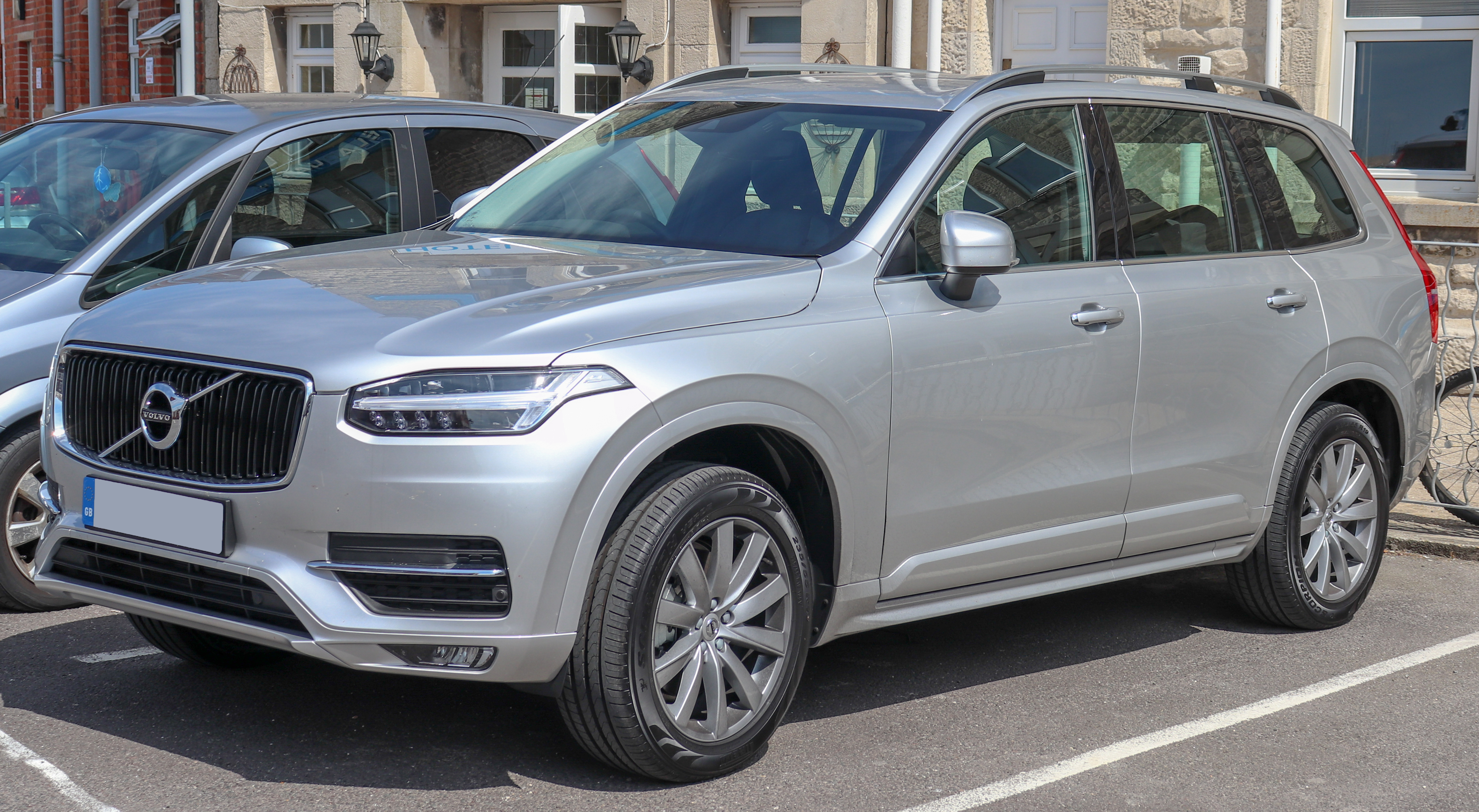
2018 Volvo XC90

Company	Owner	Notes
Koenigsegg (1994–present)		
Lynk & Co (2016–present)	Geely	Collaboration between Volvo Cars and its parent company Geely
Polestar (2017–present)	Geely through Volvo Cars in 2015	(1996–2017) as tuner and racing team
Scania AB (1911–present)	Traton of Volkswagen Group	
Volvo Group (1927–present)		
Volvo Cars (1927–present)	Geely (2010–present)	Acquired by Ford from Volvo Group in 1999, sold to Geely in 2010

== Current and defunct automobile manufacturers of Sweden ==
- Allvelo (1903–1907)
- AB Nyköpings Automobilfabrik (assembly, 1937–1960)
- AB Thulinverken (1920–1928)
- AMG (1903–1906)
- Arlöfs (in or around 1902)
- Åtvidaberg (1910–1911)
- Caresto (1996–present)
- Fram King Fulda (1957–1962)
- GEA (one in 1905)
- HB (in or around 1925)
- Hult Healey (1984–1990)
- Husqvarna (one in 1943)
- Jösse Car (1994–1999)
- Kalmar (1969–1971)
- LT (in 1909 and in 1923)
- Lidköpings Mekaniska Verkstads (one in 1923)
- Luvly
- Mania Spyder (unknown)
- Mascot (around 1920)
- NEVS (Based on Saab Automobile) (2012–2023)
- OBC (one in 1974)
- Racing Plast Burträsk (1965–1971)
- Reva (1964–1968)
- Rengsjöbilen (1914–1916)
- Saab (1947–2014)
- Self (1916–1922)
- SAF (1919–1921)
- Scania (1903–1911)
- Svensk Elektrobil (around 1945)
- Söderbloms Gjuteri & Mekaniska Verkstad (1901–unknown)
- Södertelje Verkstäder (1901–1906)
- Tidaholm (1903–ca. 1932)
- Uniti (2016–2022)
- UNO (around 1990)
- Vabis (1897–1911)

== See also ==
- List of automobile manufacturers
- List of car brands
- List of motorcycle manufacturers
- List of truck manufacturers
