= SAF =

SAF, S.A.F or saf might refer to:

== Companies ==
- SAF Tehnika, a producer of digital microwave data transmission equipment
- Strip Art Features, a comic book publishing house
- Svenska Automobilfabriken, a Swedish auto manufacturer

== Computing ==
- Service automation framework, a set of best practices for the automated delivery of services
- Service Availability Forum, (SAF or SA Forum), highly available systems model
- Storage Access Framework

== Locations ==
- Salfords railway station (station code SAF), Surrey, England, UK
- Santa Fe Regional Airport (IATA airport code SAF), Santa Fe, New Mexico, USA
- South Africa (UNDP country code SAF)

== Military ==
- Secretary of the Air Force, United States
- Singapore Armed Forces
- Slovenian Armed Forces
- Somali Air Force
- Somali Armed Forces
- Spanish Air Force
- Spanish Armed Forces
- Student Armed Force, an armed resistance organization in Myanmar
- Sudanese Air Force
- Sudanese Armed Forces

== Organizations ==
- Second Amendment Foundation, a US gun rights organization
- Škola Animiranog Filma (ŠAF), a Croatian school of animation
- Société astronomique de France, astronomical society
- Society of American Foresters
- Students for Academic Freedom, hosted by the David Horowitz Freedom Center
- Swedish Employers Association (Svenska Arbetsgivareföreningen)

== Other ==
- Safaliba language (ISO 639 language code saf), a language found in Ghana
- Safety (common abbreviation in journal titles: "Saf.")
- Sociedade Anônima do Futebol, a type of public limited company in Brazil
- Soft armored fighting, a category of armored combat sport
- Special Action Force, of the Philippine National Police
- System access fee, a Canadian telephone surcharge
- Sustainable aviation fuel
- Sir Alex Ferguson, a Scottish former football manager

== See also ==
- Safe (disambiguation)
- Saif (disambiguation)
- Saph
