= Lovely =

Lovely may refer to:

== Film and television ==
- Lovely (1979 film), an Indian Malayalam film
- Lovely (2001 film), an Indian Tamil film
- Lovely (2012 film), an Indian Telugu film
- Lovely (2024 film), a Canadian drama film directed by Serville Poblete
- Lovely (2025 film), an Indian Malayalam film
- "Lovely" (Desperate Housewives), an episode of Desperate Housewives

== Music ==
- Lovely Music, an American record label
- Stefy, an American pop band formerly known as The Lovely
- Lovelytheband, an American indie pop band

=== Albums ===
- Lovely (Jocelyn Enriquez album), 1994
- Lovely (The Primitives album), 1988
- Lovely, a 1997 album by Honey
- Lovely, a 1998 EP by Luke Vibert

=== Songs ===
- "Lovely" (Billie Eilish and Khalid song), 2018
- "Lovely" (Twenty One Pilots song), 2011
- "Lovely", by Bubba Sparxxx from Dark Days, Bright Nights
- "Lovely", by Chris Tomlin from And If Our God Is for Us...
- "Lovely", by Kanika Kapoor, Ravindra Upadhyay, Miraya Varma, and Fateh from the film Happy New Year
- "Lovely", by Lil Wayne from 500 Degreez
- "Lovely", by Shawn McDonald from Ripen
- "Lovely", by Suicidal Tendencies from Lights...Camera...Revolution!
- "Lovely", written by Stephen Sondheim for the musical A Funny Thing Happened on the Way to the Forum
- "Lovely (Yumemiru Lovely Boy)", by Tommy february6 (Tomoko Kawase), 2004

== Places ==
- Lovely, Kentucky, an unincorporated community in the United States
- Lovely County, Arkansas Territory, a county from 1827 to 1828
- Lovely Valley, South Australia, now covered by the Myponga Reservoir

== People ==
- Lovely (surname)
- Lovely Anand, Indian politician and convicted murderer
- Lovely Warren (born 1977), mayor of Rochester, New York

== Other uses ==
- Kingdom of Lovely, an Internet-based community resulting from the UK television comedy series How to Start Your Own Country
- Lovely Professional University, Jalandhar, Punjab, India
- Lovely (perfume), a fragrance by Sarah Jessica Parker

== See also ==
- Loveli (born 1989), Japanese model and television personality
- Luvli, American singer
- Luvli, a virtual pet at the website Moshi Monsters
- Luvly, Swedish automobile company
- Loverly, a 2008 album by Cassandra Wilson
