= Reva =

Reva may refer to:

== Places ==
- Reva, Belgrade, urban neighborhood of Belgrade, Serbia
- Reva, Mozambique, village in Ancuabe District in Cabo Delgado Province in northeastern Mozambique
- Reva, Trebnje, small settlement just south of Dobrnič in the Municipality of Trebnje in eastern Slovenia
- Reva, South Dakota, unincorporated community in Harding County, South Dakota, United States
- Reva, Virginia, unincorporated community in Culpeper County, Virginia, United States

== People ==
=== Given name ===
- Reva Beck Bosone (1895–1983), U.S. Representative from Utah
- Reva Brooks (1913–2004), Canadian photographer
- Reva Gerstein (1917–2020), Canadian psychologist and educator
- Reva Jackman (1892–1966), American painter, muralist, printmaker, designer and illustrator
- Reva Octaviani (born 2003), Indonesian soccer player
- Reva Rice, American musical theatre actress and singer
- Reva Rose (born 1940), American film and stage actress
- Reva Seth, Canadian journalist, author, lawyer, strategic communications consultant, speaker, coach and entrepreneur.
- Reva Siegel (born 1956), Professor of Law at Yale Law School
- Reva Stone (born 1944), Canadian digital artist
- Reva Unterman, British columnist and author
- Reva Williams, American astrophysicist

=== Middle name ===
- Elke Reva Sudin (born 1987), American artist and illustrator

=== Surname ===
- Révay family or Réva family, Hungarian noble family, who owned estates in Turóc county, the Kingdom of Hungary until the early 20th century
  - Péter Révay or Réva (1568–1622), Hungarian nobleman, Royal Crown Guard for the Holy Crown of Hungary, poet, state official, soldier and historian
- Aleksandr Reva (born 1970), Russian football player
- John Reva (born 1990), Papua New Guinean cricketer
- Maria Reva, Canadian writer
- Vitaliy Reva (born 1972), Ukrainian footballer

== Rivers ==
- Narmada River or Reva, a river in central India

== Arts and entertainment ==
- Reva L'Sheva, Israeli Jewish rock band
- Reva Shayne, a fictional character from the soap opera Guiding Light
- Reva Sevander, fictional third sister in Star Wars
- Reva (film), 2018 Gujarati film from India

== Businesses ==
- Mahindra Reva, previously Reva Electric Car Company
  - REVAi, also known as G-Wiz in the United Kingdom, a small micro electric car
- Reva APC, a South African mine-protected armoured personnel carrier
- Reva (Swedish car), a Swedish sports car

== Other ==
- Finnish profanity § reva

== See also ==
- Revaa (born 1987), Indian music director in Tamil cinema
- Rewa (disambiguation)
