= OBC =

OBC may refer to:

== Music ==
- Original Broadway Cast, a category of cast recording
- Obscured by Clouds, a 1972 soundtrack album by Pink Floyd
- Barcelona Symphony and Catalonia National Orchestra (Catalan: Orquestra Simfònica de Barcelona i Nacional de Catalunya)

== Sports ==
- Oceania Badminton Confederation
- Olympiacos Basketball Club, widely known as Olympiacos BC, in Greece

== Organisations ==
- OBC (secret society), at the University of North Carolina at Asheville
- Open Bible Churches
- Order of British Columbia, a Canadian decoration
- Oriental Bank of Commerce, a defunct bank in India
- Osaka Broadcasting Corporation, another name for Radio Osaka, a radio station in Osaka Prefecture, Japan
- Osservatorio Balcani e Caucaso, an Italian think tank
- Ottmar Beckman Cars AB
- Original Bowling Company, now Hollywood Bowl Group, a UK bowling centre operator

== Other ==
- Officer Basic Course, in the U.S. Army
- Organic and Biomolecular Chemistry, a scientific journal
- Ormond-by-the-Sea, Florida, in Volusia County
- Other Backward Class, a socio-economic designation used by the Indian government
- Online Branding Company
- Ocean bottom cables, used for reflection seismology in oil and gas exploration
- Ontario Building Code, a version of the National Building Code of Canada
- On-board charger, an electric vehicle component
