= Marble-Swift =

Defunct American motor vehicle manufacturer

Overview
- Type: Runabout, Touring Car
- Manufacturer: Marble-Swift Automobile Company
- Production: 1903–1905
- Designer: George W. Marble, George P. Swift

Chronology
- Successor: Windsor Motor Car Company

The Marble-Swift was an American automobile manufactured in Chicago, Illinois from 1903 until 1905.

== History ==
George W. Marble and George P. Swift patented a friction transmission and originally planned to sell it as a stand-alone product. Marble-Swift Automobile Company was formed and built a factory in Chicago to manufacture complete cars and the new transmission.

The Marble-Swift was a friction-drive runabout with a 16-hp twin-cylinder engine. In 1905 it was enlarged to a four-cylinder 22-hp touring car with the friction transmission, selling for $1,500 (equivalent to $53,750 in 2025).

In 1905 Marble-Swift was succeeded by the Windsor Motor Car Company.

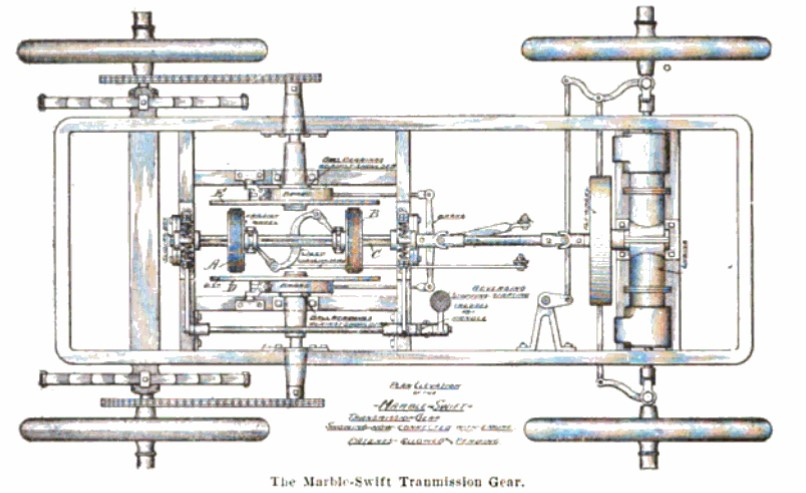
1903 Marble-Swift Transmission shown on an automobile chassis

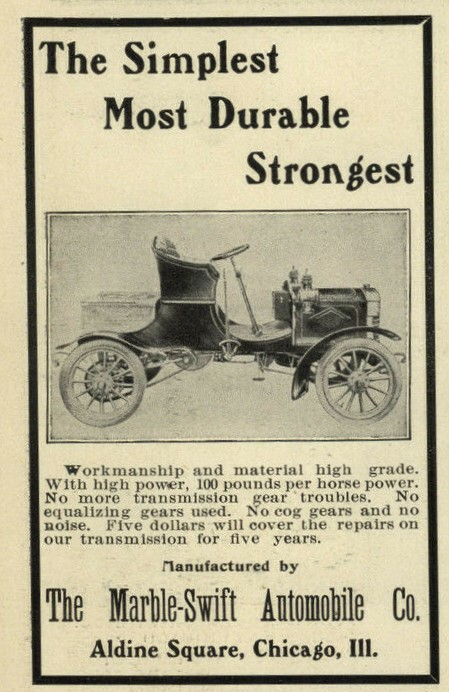
1904 Marble-Swift Runabout Advertisement
