= Davis Totem =

American automobile manufactured in the 1920s

The Davis Totem was an American automobile manufactured from 1921 until 1922. As many as ten were built; they boasted friction drive similar to that found in their contemporaries, the Kelsey and the Metz. The cars used four-cylinder Herschell-Spillman engines. The touring car, which seated five, was listed at $1695.
