= Thrige =

Thrige can refer to several things:

- Thomas B. Thrige (1866–1938), Danish entrepreneur, industrialist and businessman
- Thomas B. Thrige Street, a major street in the center of Odense, Denmark
- T-T Electric, one of Europe's leading manufacturers of d.c. motors
- Thrige Electric, from August 1, 2005, known as T-T Electric.
- Thrige-Titan, see T-T Electric
- Thrige-Scott Ltd
- Thomas B. Thrige Center for Microinstruments
- Thrige, a Danish automobile brand
