= Pilgrim of Providence =

Defunct American motor vehicle manufacturer

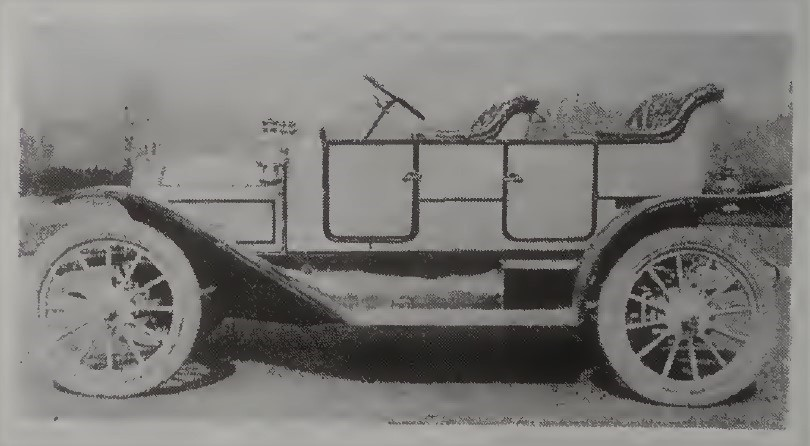
1910 Spartan (also called Pilgrim), C. W. Kelsey Manufacturing Company

The Pilgrim of Providence also called the Pilgrim of Pawtucket was an American automobile designed in 1910. The car was built as a prototype and called the Spartan.

== History ==
A prototype automobile was developed and Carl Kelsey planned to build a low price affordable car at the Maxwell-Briscoe plant in Pawtucket, Rhode Island. Kelsey ended up building his factory in Hartford, Connecticut instead and called the car the Spartan. The Spartan was to have been a four-cylinder of conventional design, but with four doors. The project was scrapped when production cost were considered to be too high after Henry Ford slashed the price on his Model T. Instead C. W. Kelsey Manufacturing Company went to a three-wheel design and produced the Motorette.
