= Astra (1922 automobile) =

The Astra was a small French cyclecar made by E Pasquet in Paris. The automobile was manufactured only in 1922.

== Features ==
It had a twin-cylinder two-stroke engine of 496 cc.

It featured independent suspension on all four wheels, as well as friction drive.
