= Lidköping =

Place in Västergötland, Sweden

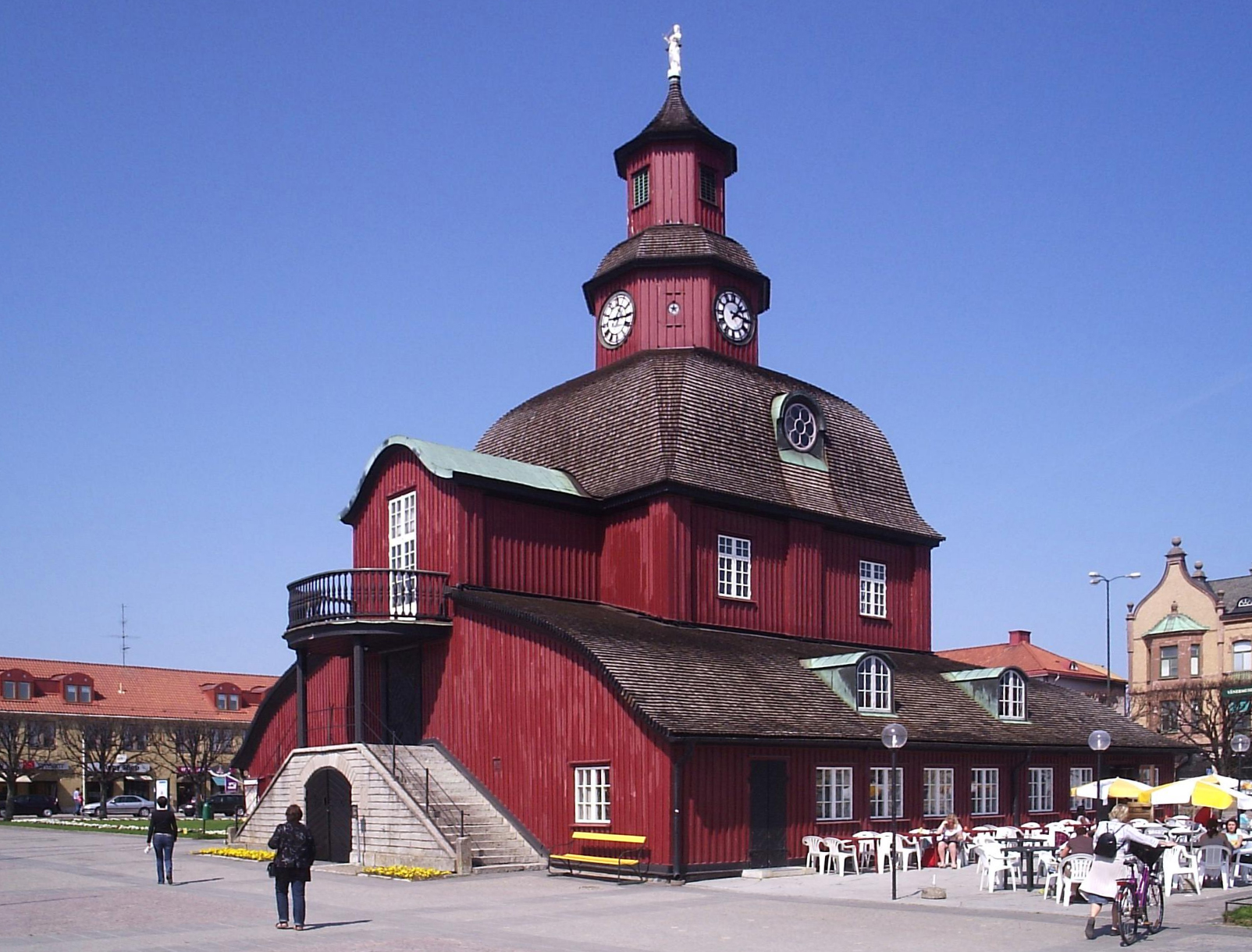
- Lidköping Town Hall

- Location within Västra Götaland Location within Sweden
- Coordinates: 58°30′N 13°11′E
- Country: Sweden
- Province: Västergötland
- County: Västra Götaland County
- Municipality: Lidköping Municipality

Area
  - Total: 14.95 km^{2} (5.77 sq mi)

Population (1 september 2025)
  - Total: 43,000
  - Density: 1,653/km^{2} (4,280/sq mi)
- Time zone: UTC+1 (CET)
  - Summer (DST): UTC+2 (CEST)
- Climate: Cfb

Lidköping is a locality and the seat of Lidköping Municipality in Västra Götaland County, Sweden. It had about 40,000 inhabitants in 2021.

It is situated on the southern shore of Lake Vänern and sometimes refers to itself as "Lidköping vid Vänern", to distinguish itself from Linköping near Sweden's east coast. Attempts have been made to change the official name to "Lidköping vid Vänern" but these attempts have not been successful.

== Geography ==
The town of Lidköping is divided by the Lidan River, flowing through the central city. The eastern side of it is called the old town, and the western side is known as the new town.

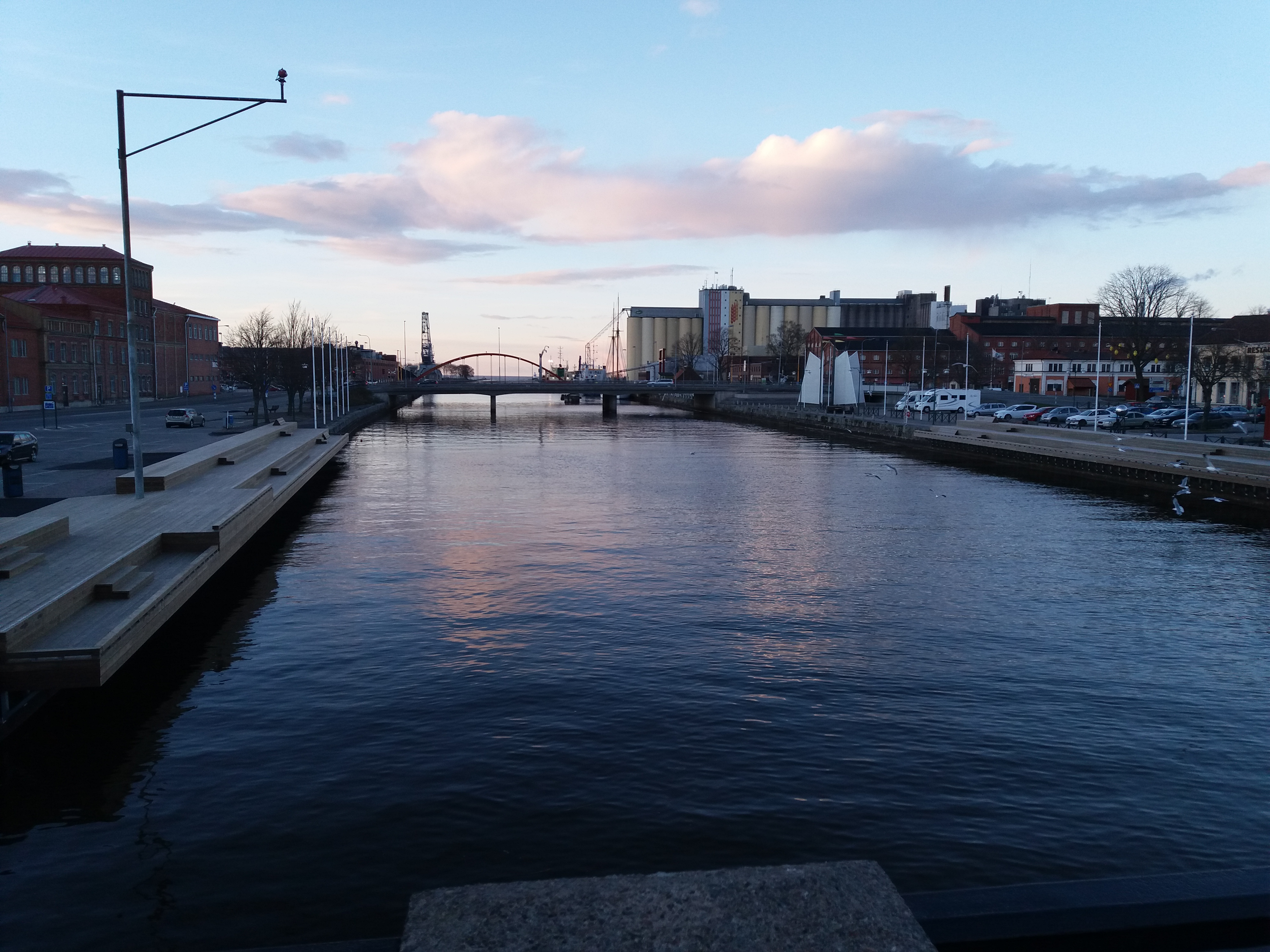
Lidan river in Lidköping in the evening

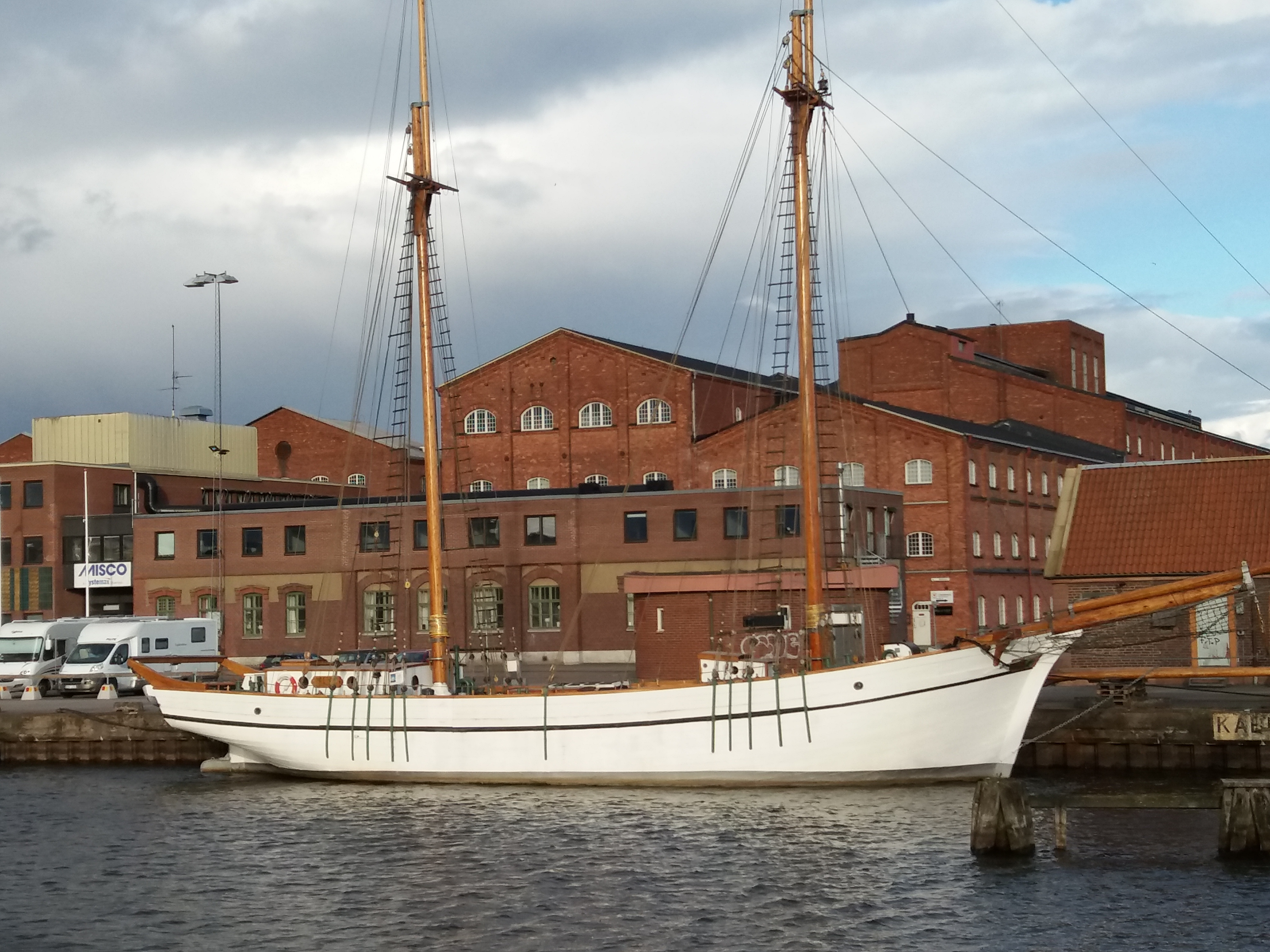
:Mina ship (1876) on Lidan, Lidköping

The municipality of Lidköping is, together with its eastern neighbor Götene, located on the Läckö-Kinnekulle peninsula. In association with several large local companies, they have a colloquial tourism company known as "Götene-Lidköping Vänern Turist AB".

== History ==
Lidköping got its charter on July 21, 1446, and thus qualifies as one of the now defunct Cities of Sweden. The city arms are almost as old. The design has varied throughout the centuries, but has always depicted a seated bishop. It is disputed if it depicts an actual bishop, but was in the 20th century decided to be a depiction of the bishop Saint Nicholas.

Around 1650, the city was incorporated into the countship of Jakob De la Gardie. However, in 1655 the crown decided to regain administration of the city. To make up the loss, De la Gardie was then given the right to found a new city on the western side of the river, starting in 1670. In 1672 the foundations were laid, and the new city grew quickly. In 1683, both sides of the city Lidköping were declared unified by the Crown, who also reclaimed possession of them both.

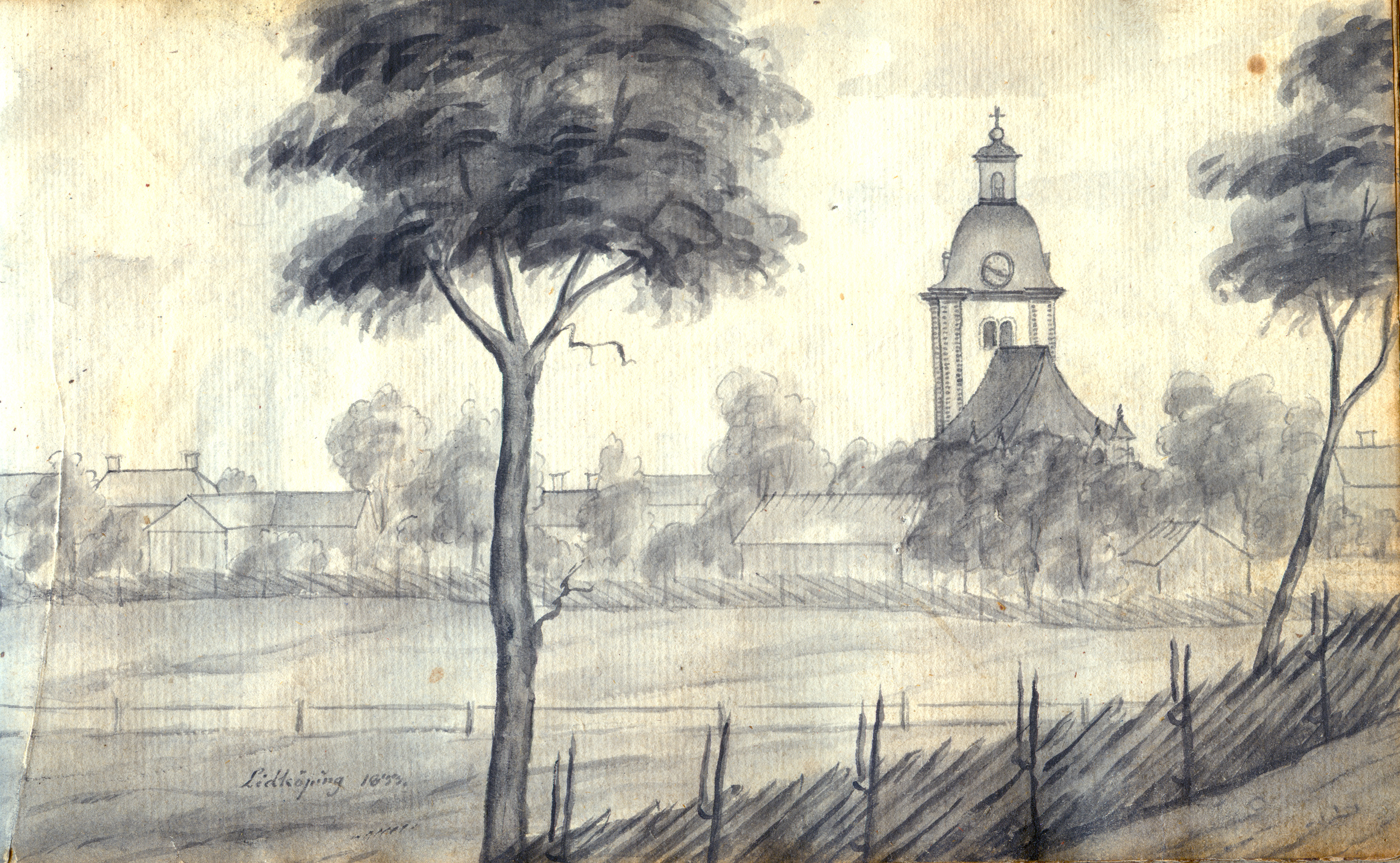
Lidköping circa 1700, from Suecia Antiqua et Hodierna

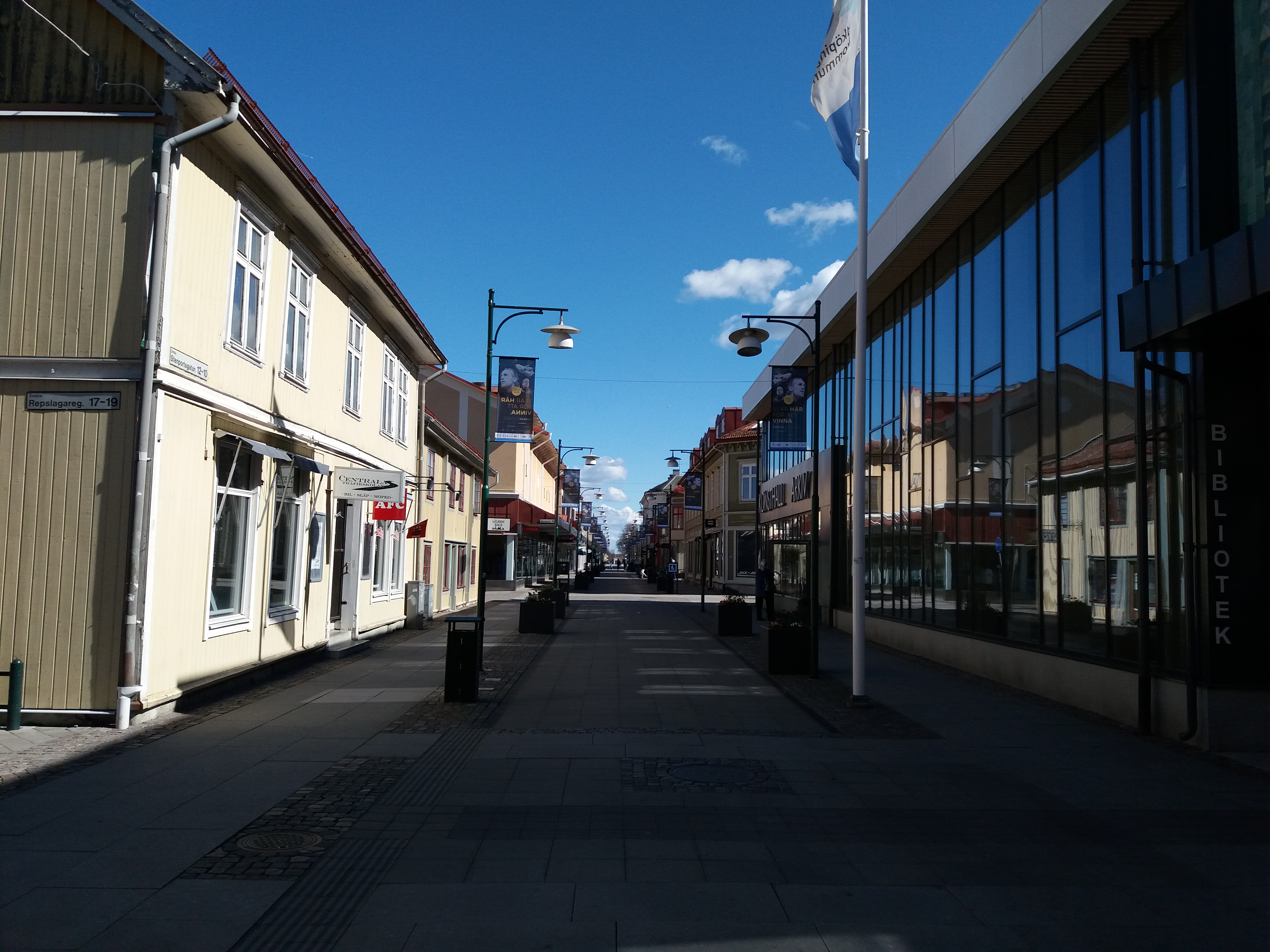
New street in Lidköping

The old town burned down in 1849, and large parts of the new town were also damaged. Following the fire, both towns were rebuilt according to a check pattern.

== Symbol ==
Lidköping is working hard to market itself as "Lidköping by Vänern". In line with this quest, they are developing a profile plan, wherein they have established the use of a symbol depicting its location by Vänern. The symbol is used in all official contexts, and also on the road sign when entering Lidköping.

== Sport ==
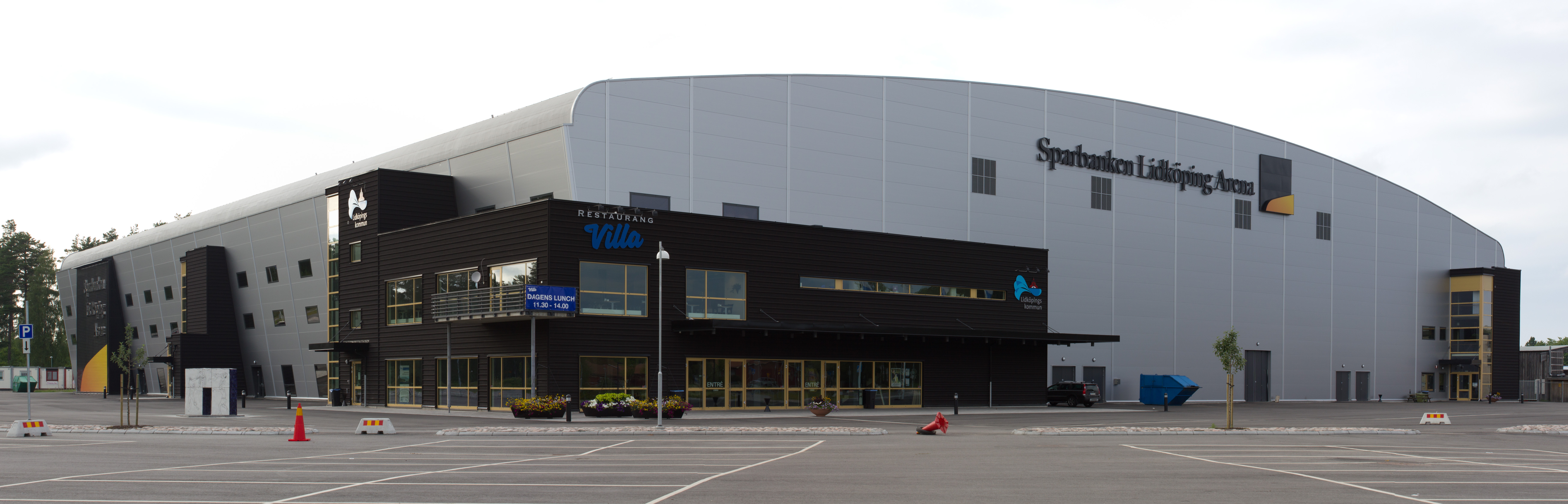
Sparbanken Lidköping Arena, home venue of Villa Lidköping BK

Villa Lidköping BK has one of the best bandy teams in Sweden. Five times they have reached the finals of Elitserien. Sparbanken Lidköping Arena is the home venue. In 2019 they won the gold medal for the first time under the leadership of Johan Sixtensson.

== Notable people ==
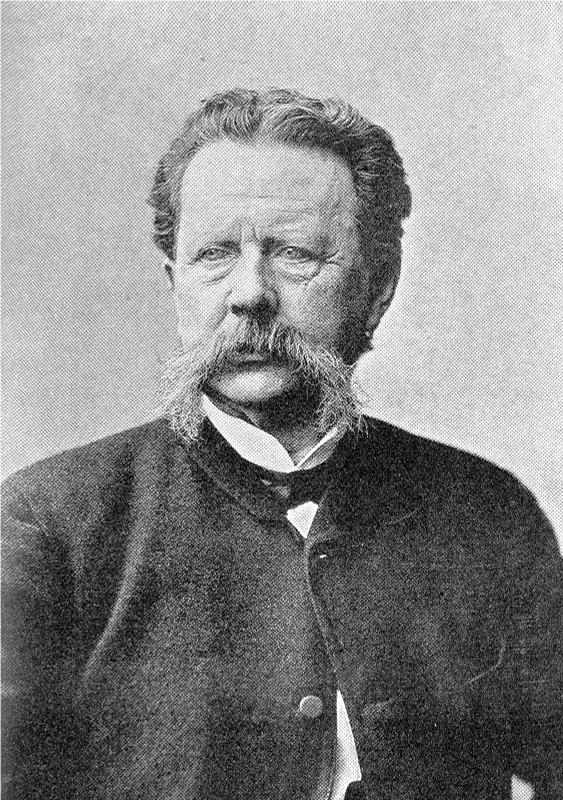
Gunnar Wennerberg, pre-1901

- Reorus Torkillus (1608–1643) priest of the Church of Sweden and the first Lutheran clergyman to settle in the USA
- Gunnar Wennerberg (1817–1901), Swedish poet, musician and politician.
- Mary Anderson (1872–1964) a Swedish-born American labour activist and an advocate for women in the workplace.
- Linda Sundblad (born 1981) a singer, actress and model.

=== Sport ===
- Evy Palm (born 1942) a female long-distance athlete
- Daniel Nordmark (born 1988) a football player
- Timmy Hansen (born 1992) a racing driver
- Christoffer Ehn (born 1996) an ice hockey player
- Jacob Peterson (born 1999) an ice hockey player
- Rasmus Dahlin (born 2000) an ice hockey player
- Ivar Sjolin, Wrestler and Olympian
- Anders Jarryd, Tennis Player

== See also ==
- Municipalities of Sweden
- Köping (concept)
- Lidköpings Mekaniska Verkstads
