= Armadale (automobile) =

The Armadale was an English automobile manufactured from 1906 to 1907 by Armadale Motors Ltd, Northwood, Middlesex, then Northwood Motor & Engineering Works, also of Northwood.

== Models ==
=== Three wheel ===
Initially called the Toboggan, the Armadale Tri-car, so-called the "perfect little three-wheeler" featured infinitely variable friction drive and a pressed steel chassis, unusual in a tricar. It used either a one-cylinder Aster or a 2-cylinder Fafnir engine.

=== Four wheel ===
In 1906, the company listed a conventional 4-wheeler with a 16 hp 4-cylinder engine.

== Tourist Trophy Race of 1906 ==
An Armadale car, owned or driven by A.C. Godwin Smith, was entered in the Tourist Trophy Race in the Isle of Man on 27 September 1906, but it did not start.
