= Anglo-Dane =

Danish automobile

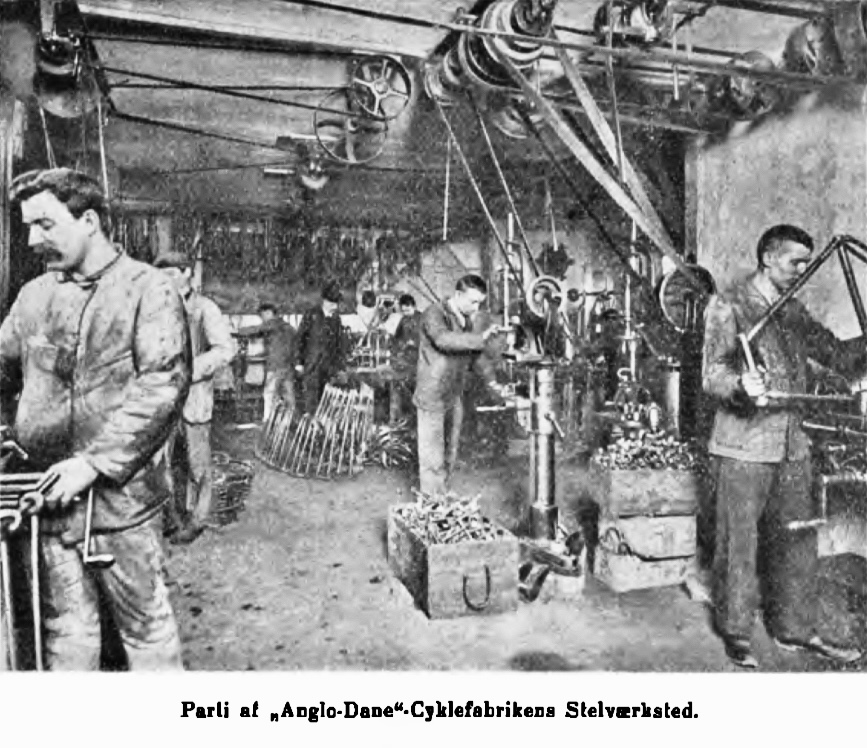
View of bicycle production at Anglo-Dane 1899

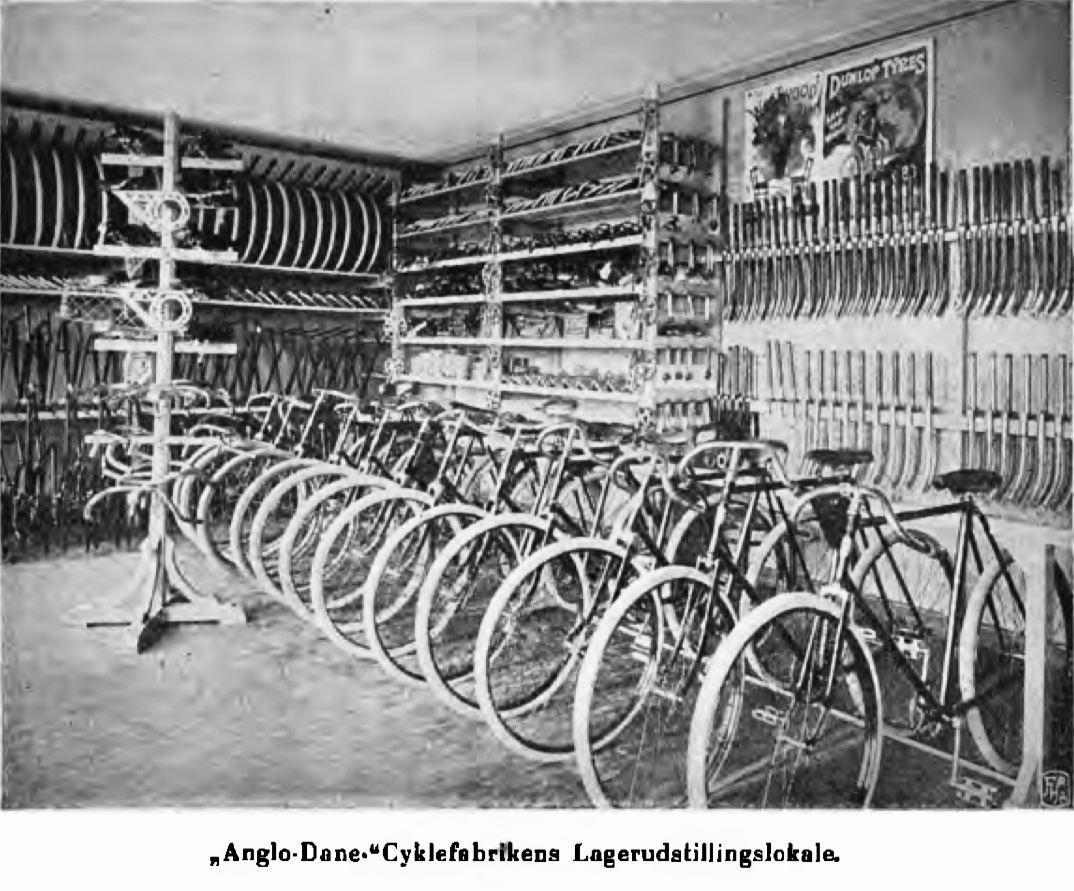
Anglo-Dane exhibition at Verstevoltgade 78 in Copenhagen (1899)

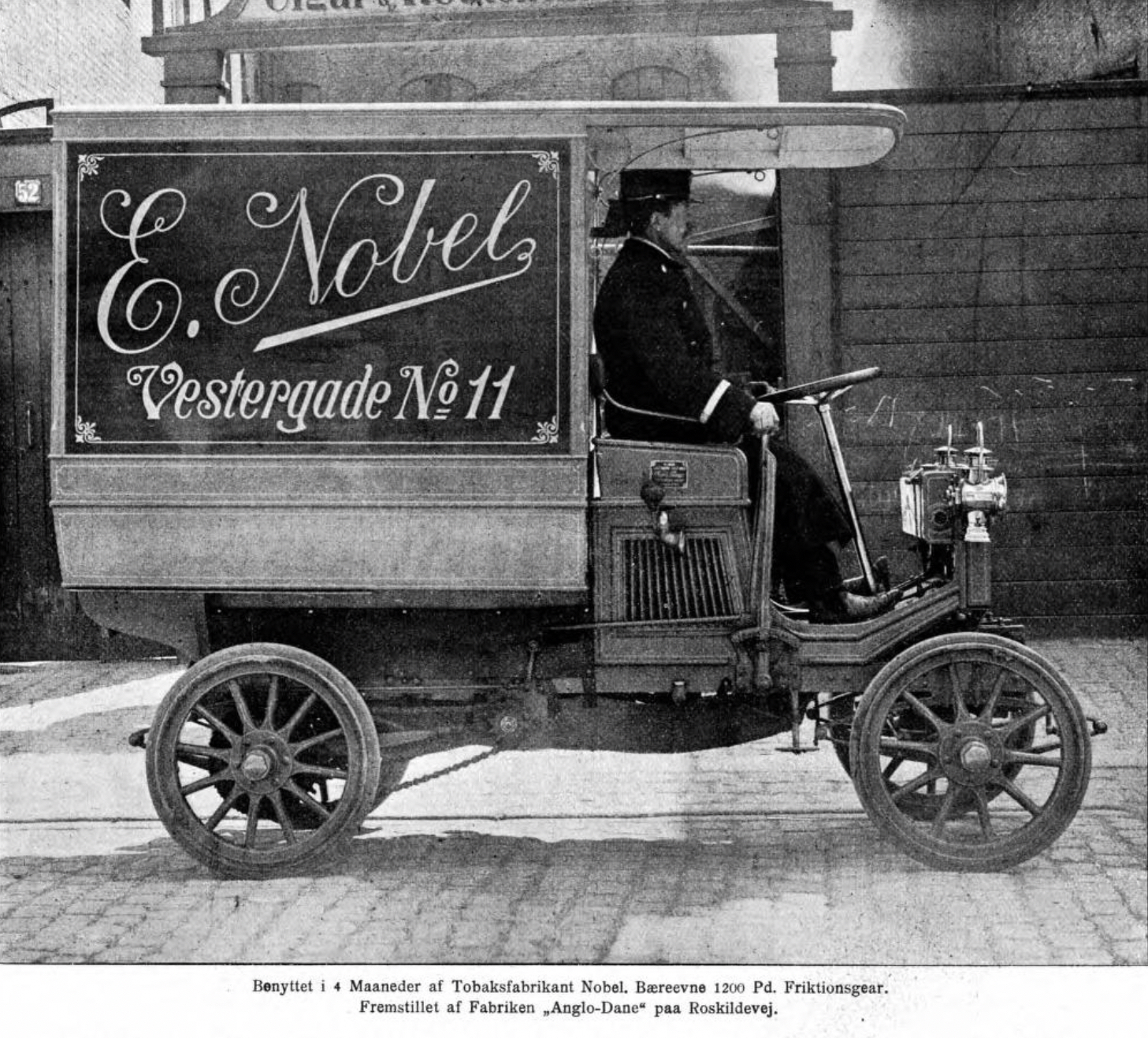
Anglo-Dane Type 2 (1906)

The Anglo-Dane was a Danish bicycle and automobile manufacturer. The company, founded by H. C. Fredriksen of Copenhagen, produced automobiles from 1902 to 1917. The striking name Anglo-Dane was the result of a survey in sports magazines. Among the many suggestions, it was preferred because it precisely indicated what the bicycles are: Danish, of English origin. Fredriksen began by building bicycles in the 1890s; for these, he used British parts - hence the hyphenated name.

The first cars were light trucks with single-cylinder Belgian Kelecom engines. Later cars were produced with their own design single-cylinder 4-5 hp engines; these featured friction drive using double discs to give an equivalent 12-speed transmission. A few passenger cars were also built with twin-cylinder engines before the company merged with automobile makers Jan and Thrige, which made Triangel commercial vehicles until 1945. About 70 Anglo-Danes were made.
