= Arista (1912 automobile) =

The Arista was a French automobile manufactured by the Établissements Ruffier in Paris from 1912 to 1915. The marque took its name from its founder, one P. Arista-Ruffier. Eight models were introduced in the first year of production; these were a 720 cc single cylinder cycle car, fours of 1460 cc, 1726 cc, and 1847 cc which featured friction drive and were sold complete with bodywork and tires, and fours of 1460 cc, 1593 cc, 1847 cc, and 2001 cc with conventional gearboxes; these last were sold as untired chassis.

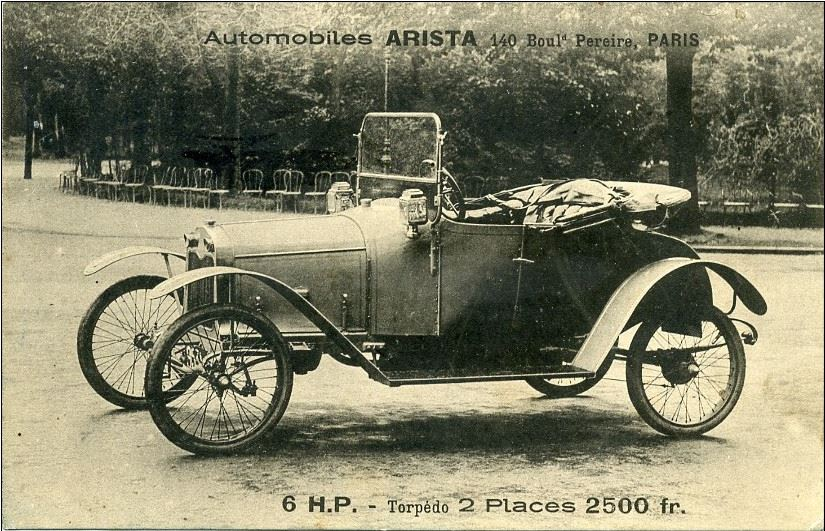
Arista light car

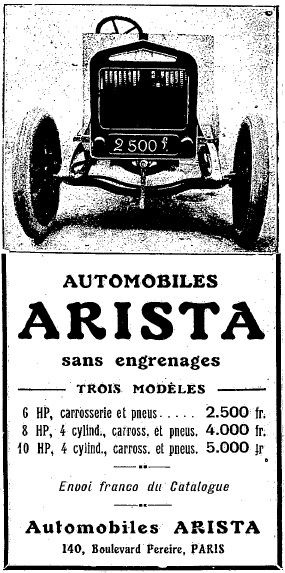
Placard publicitaire pour la marque ARISTA
