= Marcus Wallenberg-hallen =

Vehicle museum in Södertälje, Sweden

Coordinates: 59°10′58″N 17°38′1″E

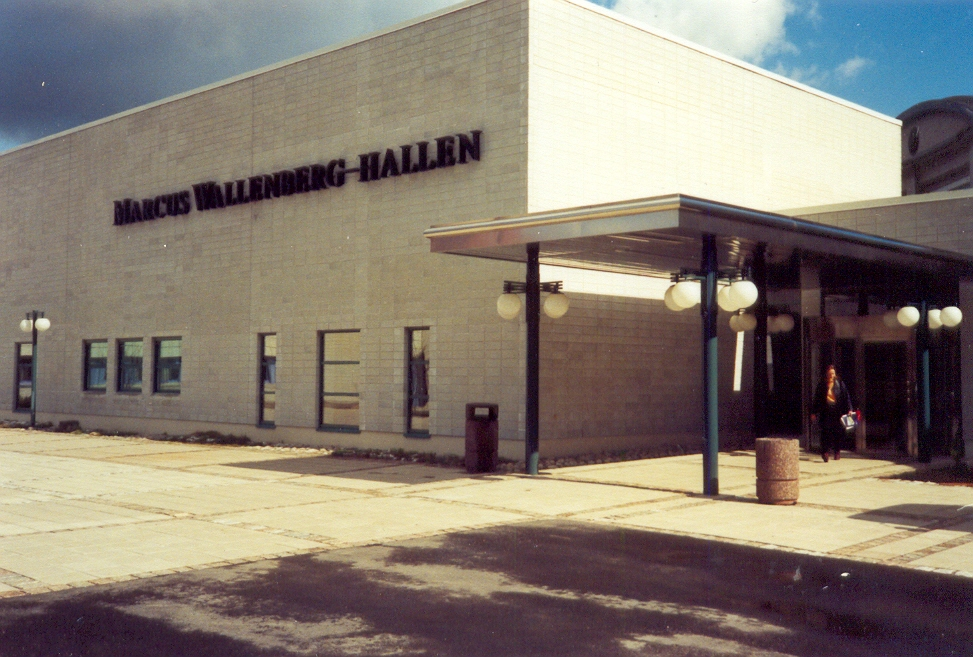
The Museum

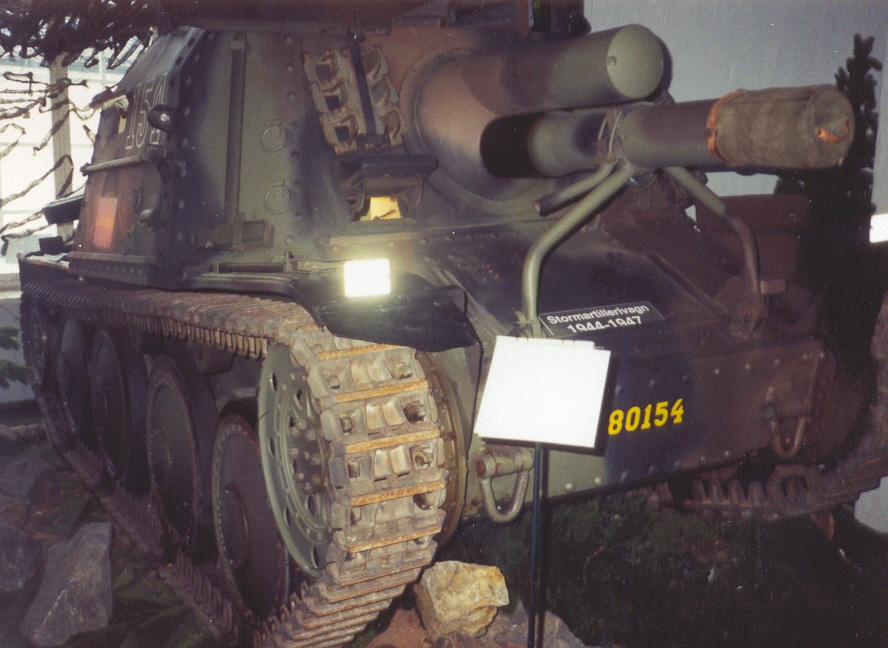
1940s Scania-Vabis SAV m43 Close-Support Artillery Vehicle

Marcus Wallenberg-hallen (The Marcus Wallenberg Hall) is a vehicle museum in Södertälje, in the Swedish province of Sörmland.

== Background ==
The museum is situated on Nyköpingsvägen, together with the head office of Scania AB, alongside the lake Saltskogsfjärden, which the locals call Scaniasjön.

The museum is named after the late financier Marcus Wallenberg, Sr., who contributed to the development of Scania in the early 20th century.

The ‘’Marcus Wallenberg-hallen’’ is Scania’s visitor centre, now known as the Scania Experience Centre.

== Exhibits ==
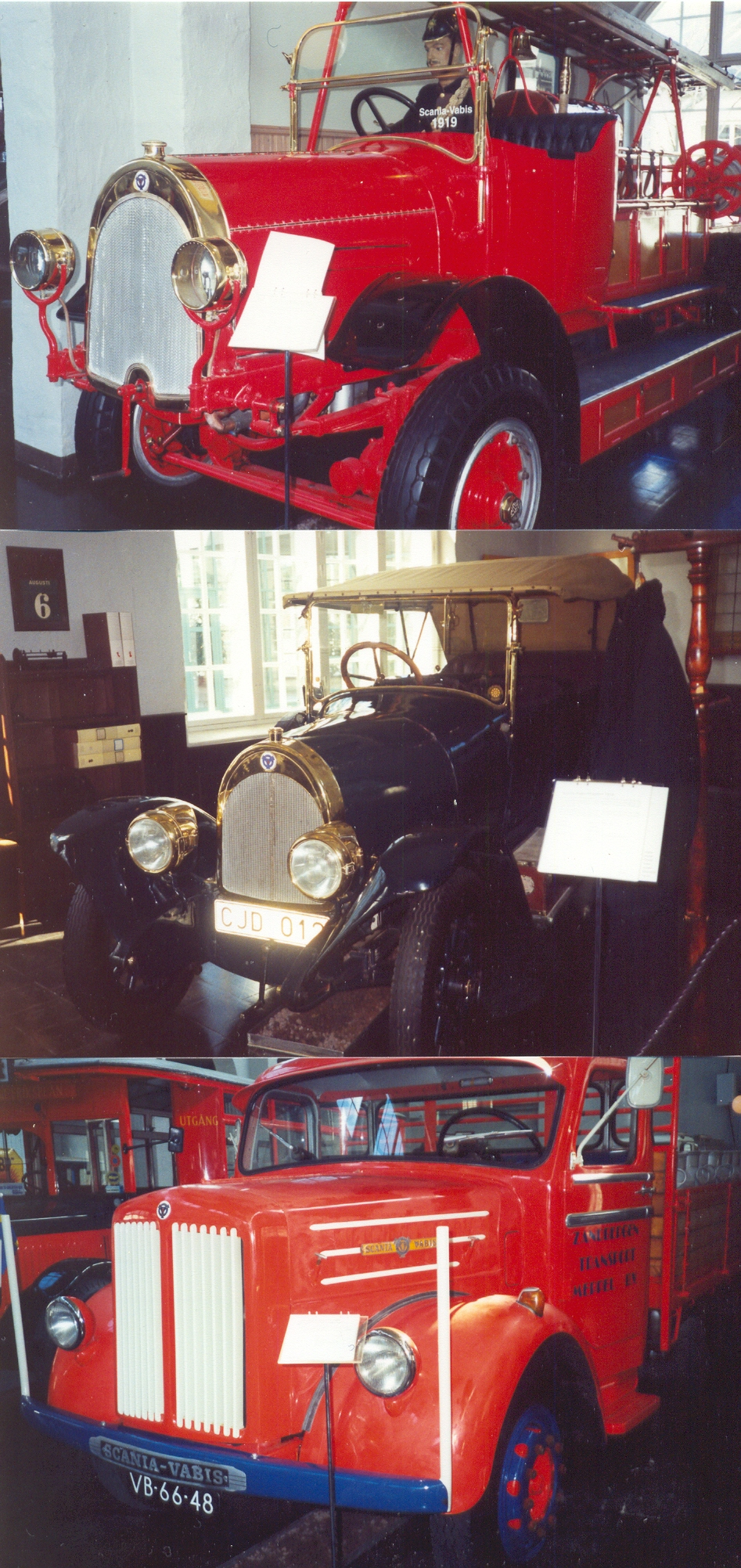
Exhibits at the Scania Museum

A varied series of early Vabis, Scania-Vabis and Scania vehicles can be found in the museum. Among other items, there is an example of the first mass-produced Swedish private car, from the year 1903. There are bicycles, motorcycles, military vehicles, tanks, trucks and buses. There are even railway wagons that belonged to Statens Järnvägar (Sweden’s state railway) and are a working monument to Sweden’s railways from the early 19th century until the beginning of the 20th century. The exhibits have been restored to their original condition. A little less than half of the museum is made up of newer vehicles, produced in the 21st century.
