= Lidan River =

River in Sweden

Coordinates: 58.5114°N 13.1664°E

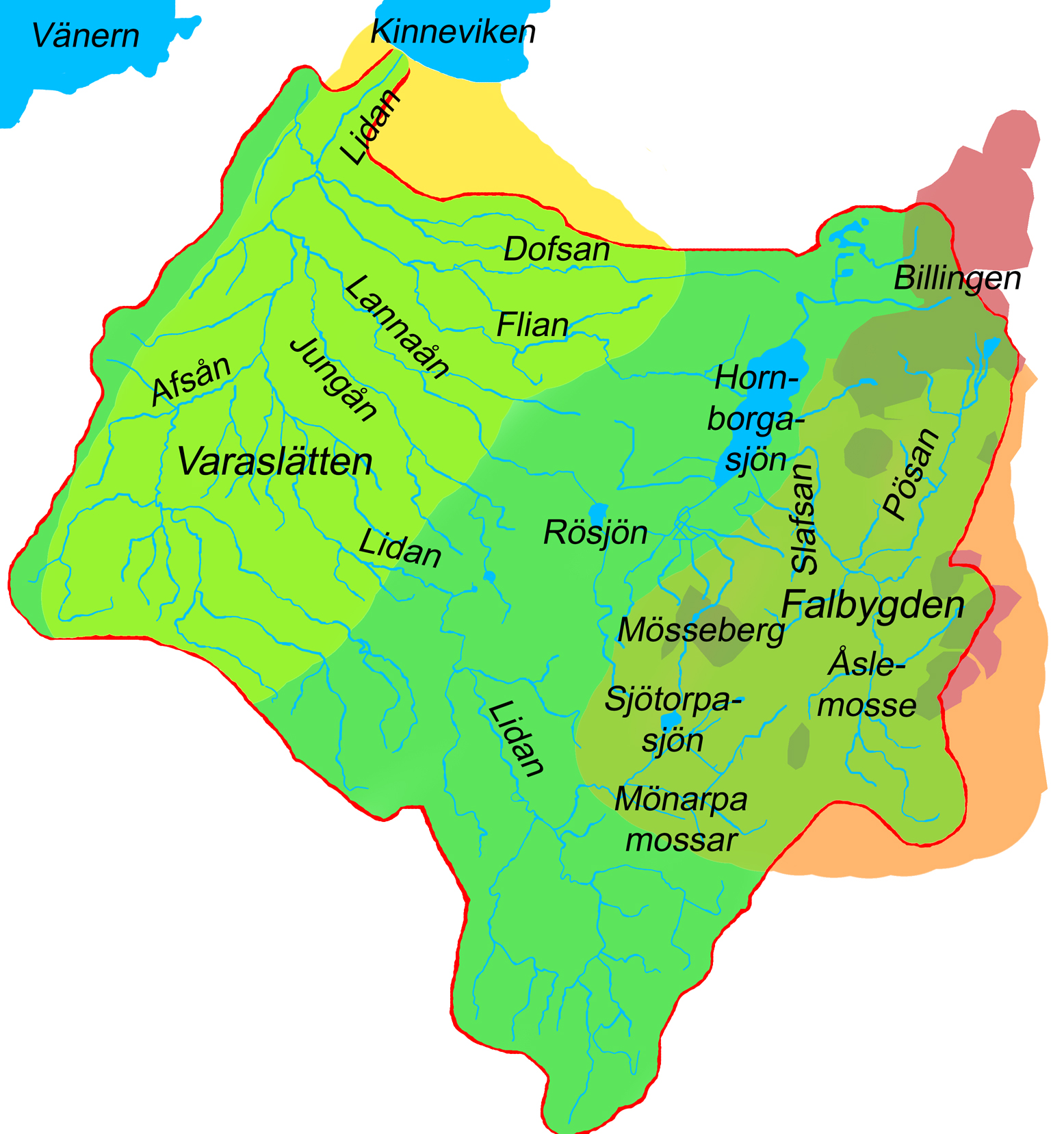
Map of the basin of Lidan.

Lidan is a Swedish river in the historical province Västergötland and the current Västra Götalands län. Lidan flows into Vänern by Lidköping and therefore the name of the city Lid-köping. The river begins in the highland of Ulricehamn. Asp is having the river as its habitat. The river is 93 kilometer long and its basin is 2.262 km².

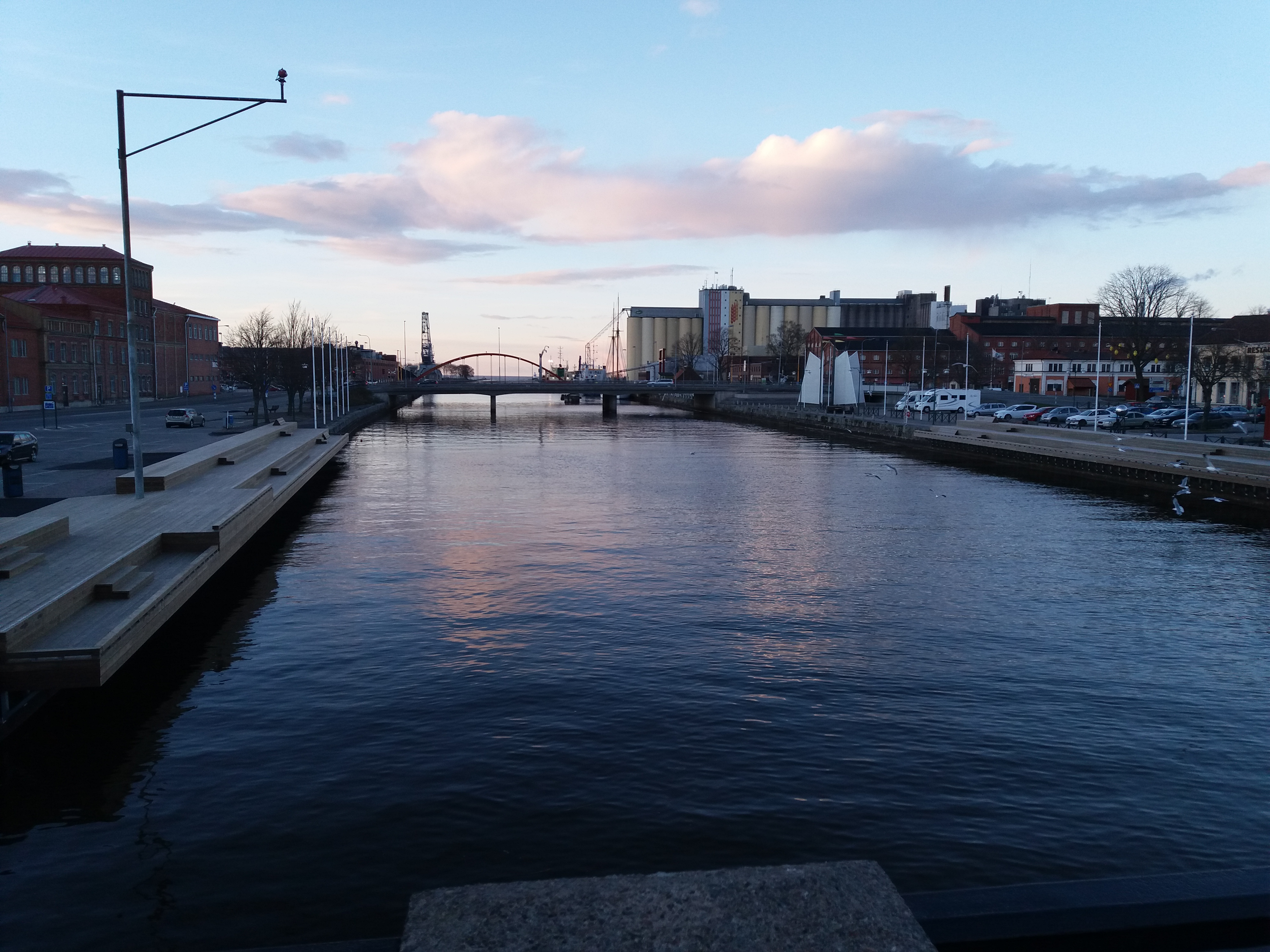
Lidan river in Lidköping in the evening

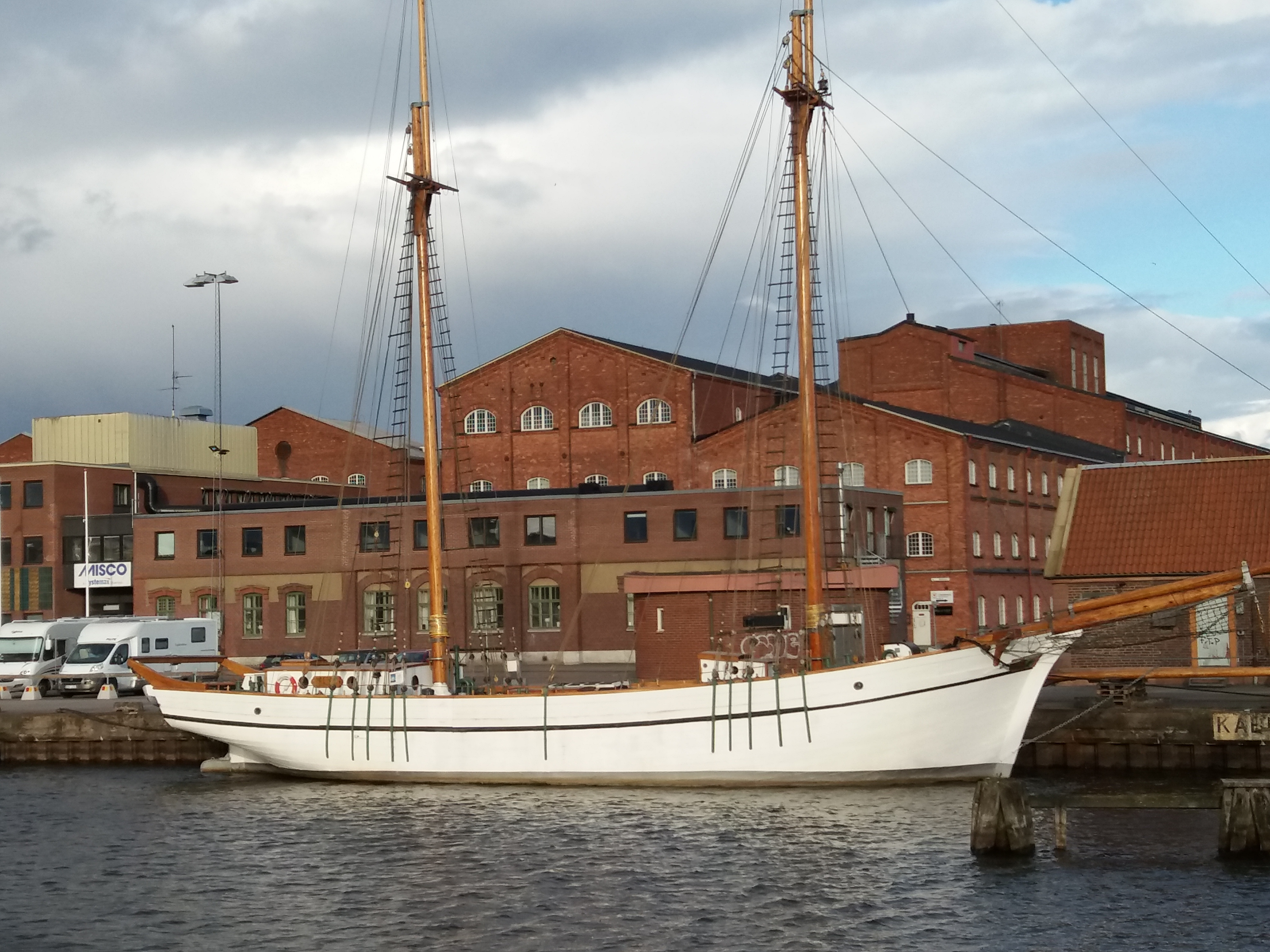
:Mina ship (1876) on Lidan, Lidköping

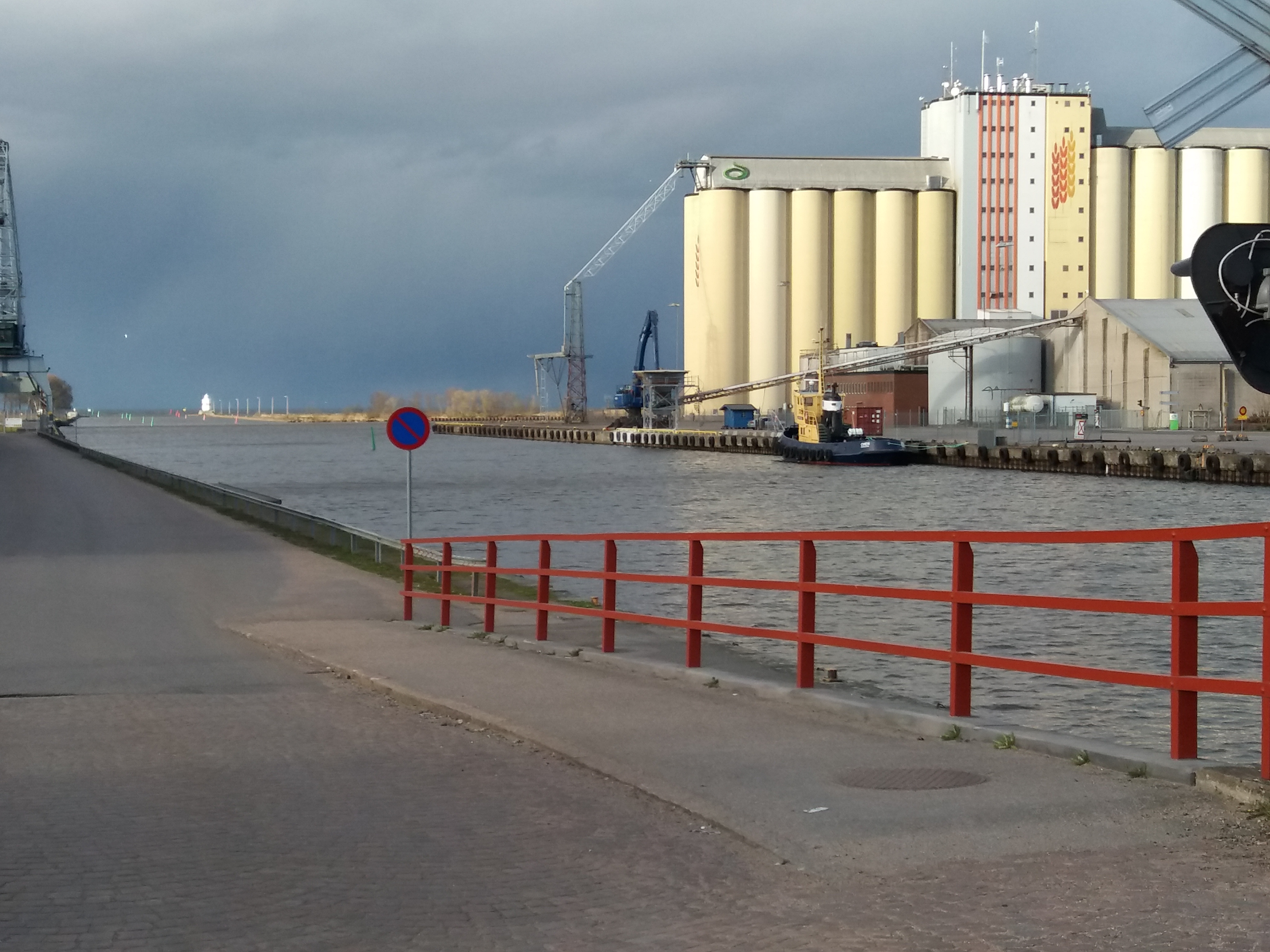
Lidköping harbour on Lidan river
