= Rewa =

Rewa may refer to:

== Places ==
=== Fiji ===
- Rewa (Fijian Communal Constituency, Fiji), a former electoral division of Fiji
- Rewa Province, Fiji
- Rewa River, the widest river in Fiji

=== Guyana ===
- Rewa River (Guyana)

=== India ===
- Rewa Plateau, between the Kaimur and Vindhya Ranges in Madhya Pradesh
- Rewa, Madhya Pradesh, a city
- Rewa district, Madhya Pradesh
- Rewa division, Madhya Pradesh
- Rewa (Lok Sabha constituency), Madhya Pradesh, India
- Rewa (princely state), a princely state in India
- Rewa (Vidhan Sabha constituency), Madhya Pradesh
- Alternate name for the Narmada River

=== Poland ===
- Rewa, Poland, a village in Pomeranian Voivodeship

== Other uses ==
- HMHS Rewa, a British hospital ship Rewa sunk by a U-boat off the Bristol Channel in 1918
- Rewa F.C., a Fijian football team
- Rewa's Village, a community project in Kerikeri, New Zealand
- Rewa Ultra Mega Solar plant in Rewa district, India

== See also ==
- Reiwa
- Reva (disambiguation)
- Révay
