= Rengsjöbilen =

Swedish car manufacturer

- Industry: Car Manufacturing
- Founded: 1914; 112 years ago
- Founder: Anders Jonsson
- Defunct: 1916

Rengsjöbilen (the Rengsjö car), Jonsson or just "Bilen" (the car) were names given to a series of ten cars made by sawmill owner Anders Jonsson in Rengsjö, Hälsingland, Sweden between 1914 and 1916. The cars were two-seaters with tandem seating. Length 320 cm and width 120 cm. Weight 445 kg. The engine was 75x100 cc. The body, fenders, chassis, and other parts were made by Höjens verkstäder in Rengsjö. Many components such as motorcycle wheels, chains, and engine were bought from other sources. The car used belt transmission, and is said to have used a water-cooled, two-cylinder, two-stroke engine made in Morgårdshammar, mainly intended for boats, of power reported to have been between 6 and 10 hp. After production ended, several employees joined car manufacturer SAF in Bollnäs.

Four photographs of the cars exist, but the only physical remnant is due to a naughty boy: a son of Jonsson's took a car for a drive, and dented the grille. A man at the factory made him a new one so he could keep the incident a secret; he threw the dented grille into a lake. When he grew up he retrieved the grille and gave it to the old homestead museum.
