= UNO 001 =

UNO 001 was the name of the only produced car from the planned UNO project to create a sports car made in Linköping, Sweden. The project started in the late 1980s with a budget of 3 million SEK and the backing of several strong financial backers. They managed to produce the UNO 001, but then something went wrong. In the 2000s it was for sale for 30000 SEK and it as of 2009 undergoing restoration.

The car is made steel tube frame with body parts of steel sheets. According to a 1980s commercial it could be assembled in two hours. Much of the parts used come from Saab, including the engine mounted in a mid engine configuration.
