= Svensk Elektrobil =

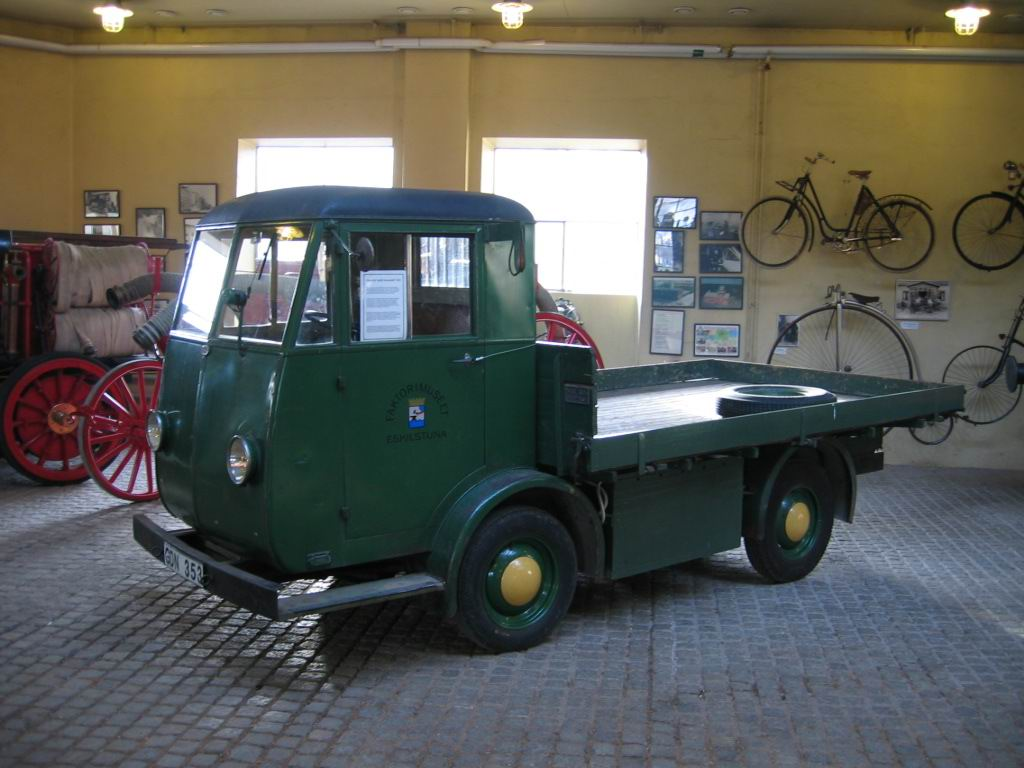
1943 electric truck.

Svensk Elektrobil AB (SEA) was a Swedish company that made electric vehicles. The Company was founded by Asea and was located at Rosenlundsgatan in southern Stockholm. The vehicle loaded 2.5 tonnes and had a top speed of 25 km/h.

== Specification ==
The vehicle had an electric motor connected to Tudor batteries rated at 250 Ah. One of the models, the EV 12 launched in 1943, had a duo system with two motors. An extra motor could be connected when driving uphill or when heavily loaded. Most models had a range of 60–70 km, but 127 km was achieved.

== History ==
Production of electric vehicles ended at the end of the 1940s due to competition from gasoline powered cars. In 1959 the company was renamed Svensk Reaktorteknik and later to ASEA-Atom and is as of 2009 named Westinghouse.
