= Lidköpings Mekaniska Verkstads =

Swedish engineering manufacturer

Lathe change gears manufactured by Lidköpings Mekaniska Verkstads AB in 1916

Lidköpings Mekaniska Verkstads AB (LMV) is an engineering manufacturer in Lidköping, Sweden. It has been a subsidiary of Motala Verkstad Group AB (MVG) since December 2019.

The company was founded in 1875. It originally produced many different components and machines that were resold to the industry. They had plans for automobile production and in 1923 a prototype had been made. The design was by Åke W Eklund. The car was impressive with its low weight (475 kg) and details well suited for the bad Swedish roads of the time. The car was powered by a French four-cylinder CIMA engine with a Cozette carburettor. The car proved to be reliable, strong and with high acceleration. The plan was to have various sub-contractors making the parts for the car and then having the parts assembled at the LMV plant. Via SKF, Assar Gabrielsson, later founder of Volvo, had many contacts with LMV, and it is possible that it was from LMV he got the idea to use several subcontractors. LMV had parts made for two other cars, but a change of owner of the company meant that they were never assembled and no production was ever started.

SKF bought its first grinding machine from LMV in 1908, which led to the companies being merged in 1929. From the year 2000, LMV was part of KMT Group (Karolin Machine Tool AB). LMV then became a wholly owned subsidiary of LMT (Lidköping Machine Tools), both of which were part of the KMT group. In March 2008, LMV was acquired by Norekon Invest AB, which owned engineering company Noremech AB. In December 2019, LMV was acquired by Motala Verkstad Group AB (MVG).
