= Lovely (surname) =

Lovely is an English surname. Notable people with the surname include:

- Arvinder Singh Lovely (Deoli MLA) (1965–2021), Indian politician
- Arvinder Singh Lovely (born 1968), Indian politician
- Jackie Lovely, Canadian politician from Alberta
- Joan Lovely, American politician
- John A. Lovely (1843–1908), American jurist
- Karen Lovely (born 1959), American electric blues singer and songwriter
- Keni-H Lovely (born 2000), American football player
- Louise Lovely (1895–1980, born as Nellie Louise Carbasse), Australian actress
- Pete Lovely (1926–2011), American racecar driver
- Stephen Lovely (born 1966), American writer
