= Service automation framework =

Set of practices

The Service Automation Framework (SAF) is a set of best practices for the automated delivery of services. The concept builds further on the self-service practices of ITIL and IT Service Management. In its current form, the SAF is published as in a series of volumes, covering different processes of service automation. The Service Automation Framework is maintained and updated by the Service Automation Framework Alliance, an independent body of knowledge for the advancement of service automation.

SAF describes processes, procedures, tasks, and checklists which are not organization-specific, but can be applied by an organization for establishing integration with the organization's strategy, delivering value, and maintaining a minimum level of competency. It allows the organization to establish a baseline from which it can plan, implement, and measure. It is used to demonstrate compliance and to measure improvement. Since December 2016, APMG-International provides the examination for the SAF.
