= Arlöfs Waggonfabrik =

Swedish engineering company

Arlöfs Waggonfabrik was a mechanical workshop earlier known as "Rössels mekaniska verkstad" that made railway cars.

Little is known about the automobiles made by the company, but they participated in a car show in Copenhagen in 1902 where they presented a truck with a loading capacity of 3000 kg. It was a foreign brand assembled by Arlöf and sold under their own name. Arlöf also sold Peugeot cars under their own name, probably for only a few years around 1902.
