= Thrige (automobile) =

The Thrige was a Danish automobile manufactured in Odense between 1911 and 1917 by the Thomas B. Thrige company (now T-T Electric). The company was founded in 1894 and made electric motors.

== Vehicles ==
The first vehicles were electrically powered trucks coming from the company's background in electric motor manufacture. Car manufacture followed using 4-cylinder engines from Ballot and Daimler. The trucks moved to engines from White and Poppe, Continental and Hercules. The 1914 car used a 12 hp Ballot engine driving the rear axle through a three-speed gearbox. There was no differential on the rear axle.

== Merger ==
In 1918, the automobile manufacturing part of the Thomas B. Thrige company merged with Anglo-Dane and JAN to form De forenede Automobilfabrikker A/S. No more cars were made, the new company manufacturing mainly buses under the Triangel brand until 1950.
