= Södertelje Verkstäder =

Swedish company

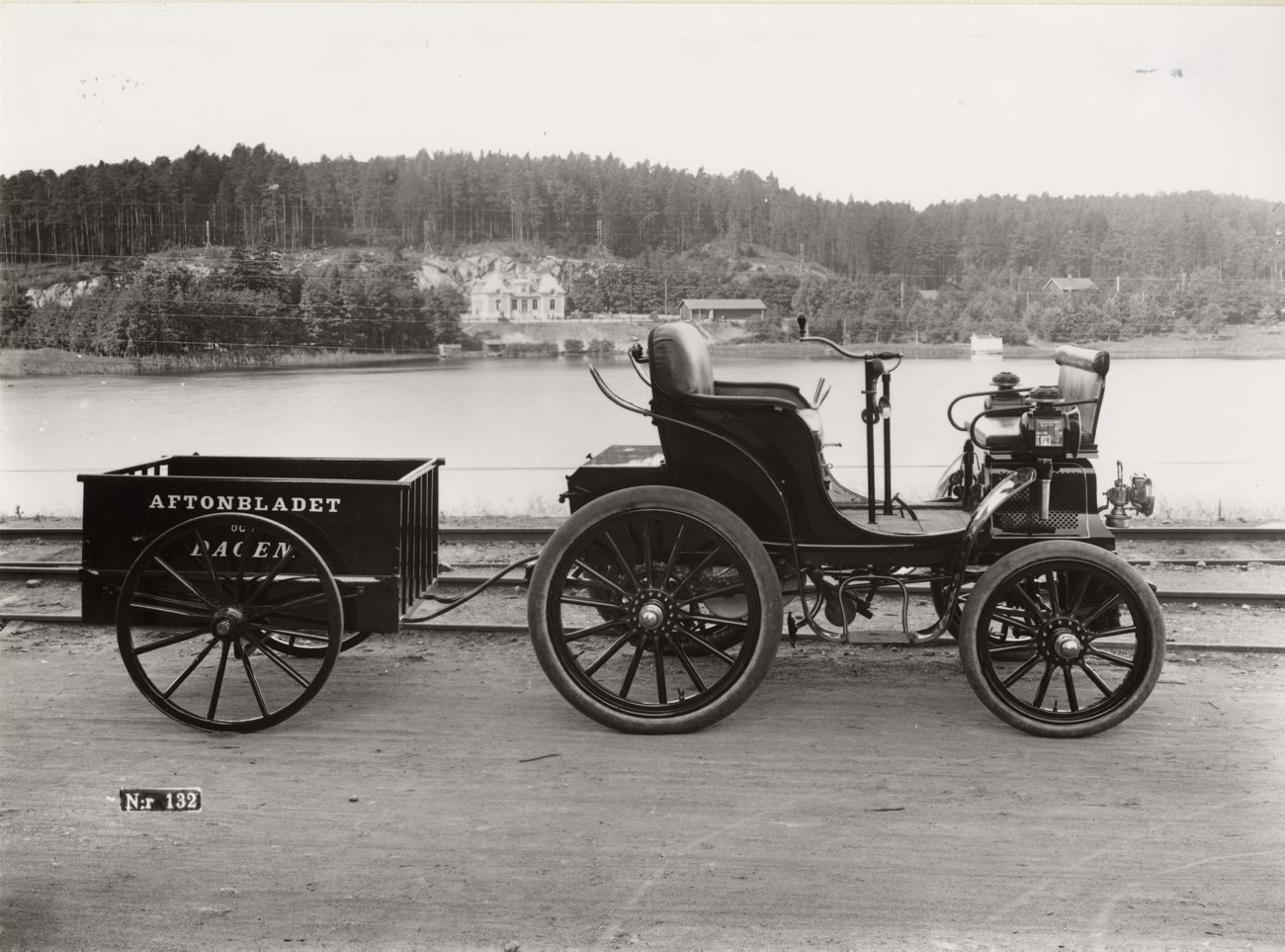
- 1902 Norden, a license-built Northern Runabout
- Headquarters: Södertälje, Sweden

Södertelje Verkstäder was a Swedish company in Södertälje that made railway cars and Draisine. In 1901 the builder of electric cars Harald Håkansson agreed to a contract that gave Södertelje Verkstäder access to blueprints and engines from Kühlstein, NAG and Protos that they sold under the name "Helios". Starting in 1902, the company also imported the Oldsmobile Curved Dash lookalike Northern (made by ex-Oldsmobile employees J D Maxwell and C B King) from Detroit, USA and sold it as "Norden". However, the market wasn't ready for automobiles, and in 1906 they sold the remaining stock but continued making railway cars and airplanes.
