= Maskinfabriks-aktiebolaget Scania =

Swedish vehicle manufacturer

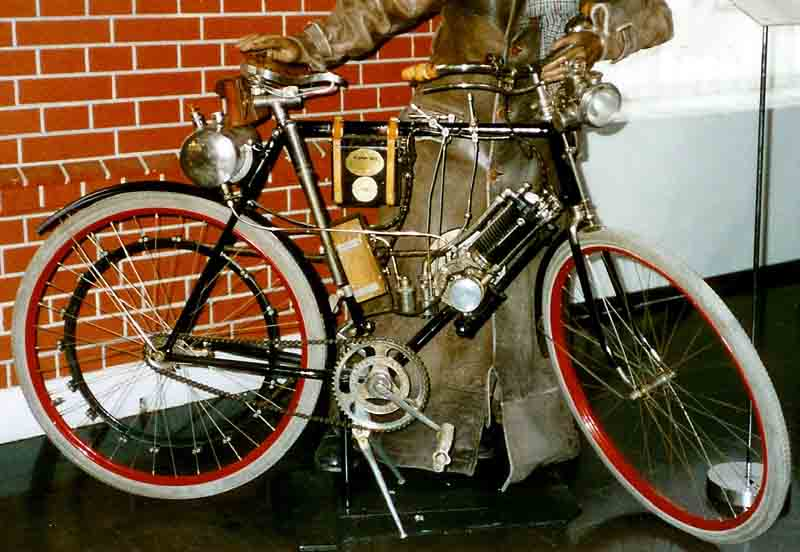
- 1903 Scania bicycle, fitted with an engine connected by a leather belt.
- Industry: Bicycles; Automotive
- Founded: 1900
- Defunct: 1911
- Fate: Merged with Vabis, to create Scania-Vabis
- Headquarters: Malmö, Sweden

Maskinfabriks-aktiebolaget Scania (Maskinfabriks AB Scania), translates Machine Factory Limited Company Scania, was a Swedish bicycle manufacturer established in Malmö in 1900. The company rapidly expanded to manufacture other products like precision gears, vacuum cleaners, automobiles, trucks and engines. The company was in 1911 merged with Vabis, to form Scania-Vabis.

== History ==
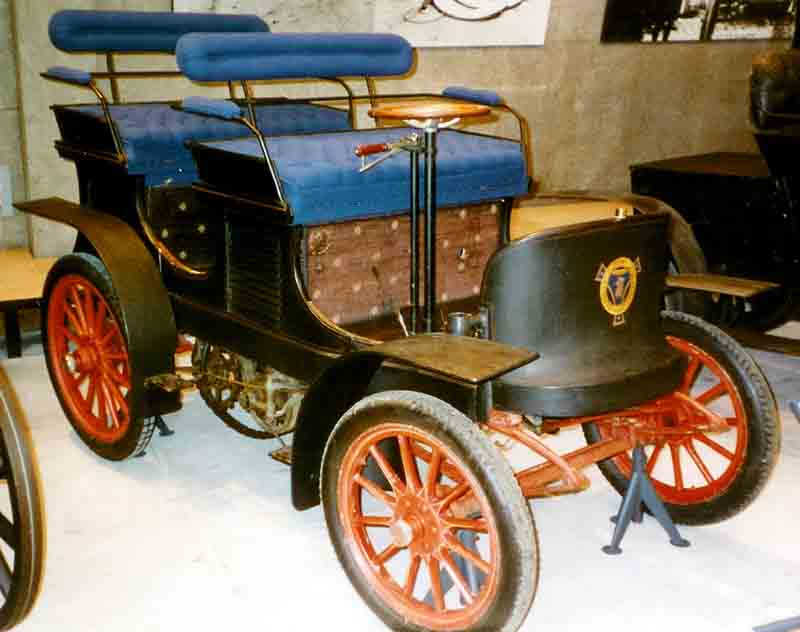
1901 Scania A1 prototype.

British bicycle manufacturer Humber & Co had set up a Swedish subsidiary in Malmö in 1896. In 1900, Humber moved their operations to Stockholm, which led to local entrepreneurs taking over the Malmö workshop, initially manufacturing the same as before. The new company was named after Scania, the old Latin name of the region that is locally known as Skåne.

The first automobile prototypes were built in 1901, the Scania A1, with production starting in 1903 and soon also trucks. The company built their first industrial engine in 1905, a 24-hp 4-cylinder water pump engine for the Stockholm fire brigade. By 1908, when the company had sold some 70 automobiles, built with engines, gearboxes and other parts imported from France and Germany, they started making their own engines.

It is considered that the first ever occasion that a Scania truck was transported out of Sweden was for the first international auto show at Akershus Fortress in Norway's capital Kristiania on 20 May 1909. The display included a truck of type IL, a 3-tonne truck built between 1908 and 1910, and an engine, but neither were sold, and returned to Malmö. The first export sale of a Scania truck happened in 1910, when the city of Saint Petersburg in Russia needed a cable repair truck for its tramway.

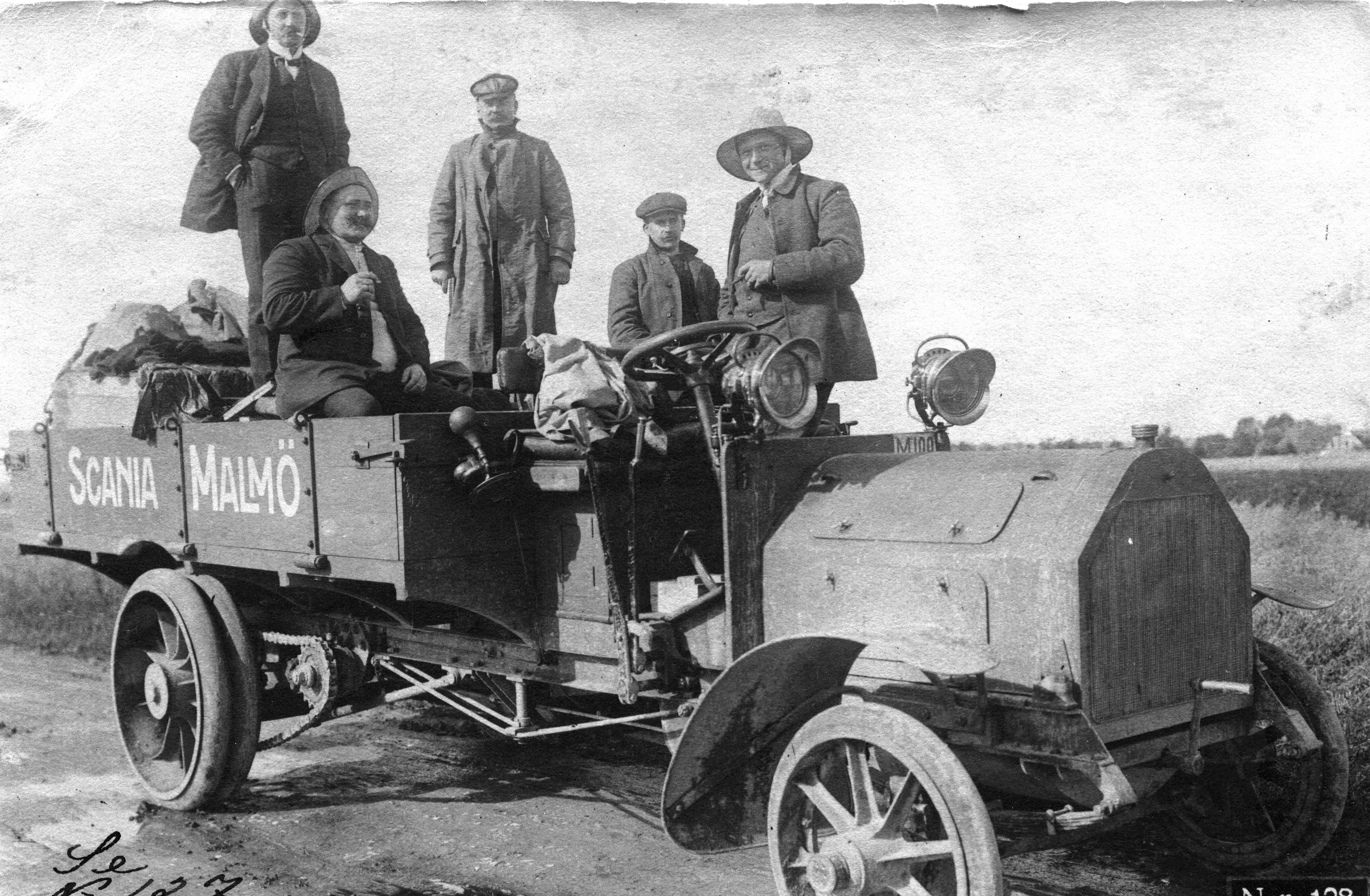
Picture from the 1909 trip from Malmö to Stockholm.

As a marketing stunt the same year, a group of six representatives from the factory set off from Malmö with a type E truck loaded with 1.8 tonnes of cargo with the auto show in Stockholm as their destination, a trip that took them three days. To avoid any risk of a flat tyre, the truck was fitted with massive rubber tyres. This 520-kilometre trip is considered the first long-distance truck transport in Sweden ever, and was considered at the time as a major achievement.

The manufacturing of engines, automobiles and trucks was so successful that in 1910, the board decided to phase out all other products, leaving their bicycle manufacturing roots. Per Alfred Nordeman, managing director of Maskinfabriks-aktiebolaget Scania, was then looking for a partner to build coachwork, and found Södertälje-based Vagnfabriks Aktiebolaget i Södertelge (Vabis). Vabis was in such a bad economic state that its owner, steel manufacturer Surahammars Bruk, considered closing it down, but a proposal from Nordeman stopped that from happening. An agreement was reached in November 1910, and in 1911 the two companies were merged to create Scania-Vabis, today known as Scania AB. Initially, the headquarters and manufacturing of trucks continued in Malmö, while development and production of engines and light automobiles happened at Vabis' workshop in Södertälje. The management moved their headquarters to Södertälje in 1912, and the truck production was the last to leave Malmö in the late 1920s.

The company's logo was a three-spoke bicycle crank with the head of a griffin, the coat of arms of Scania, in the middle, and after the merger the same logo was used for more than five and a half decades before being replaced. Since 1984, the logo once again depicts the griffin on a shape simplified from the crank, even if the succeeding company neither has any relation to the region, nor manufactures bicycles.
