= Vabis =

Swedish railway car manufacturer

Vagnfabriks Aktiebolaget i Södertelge
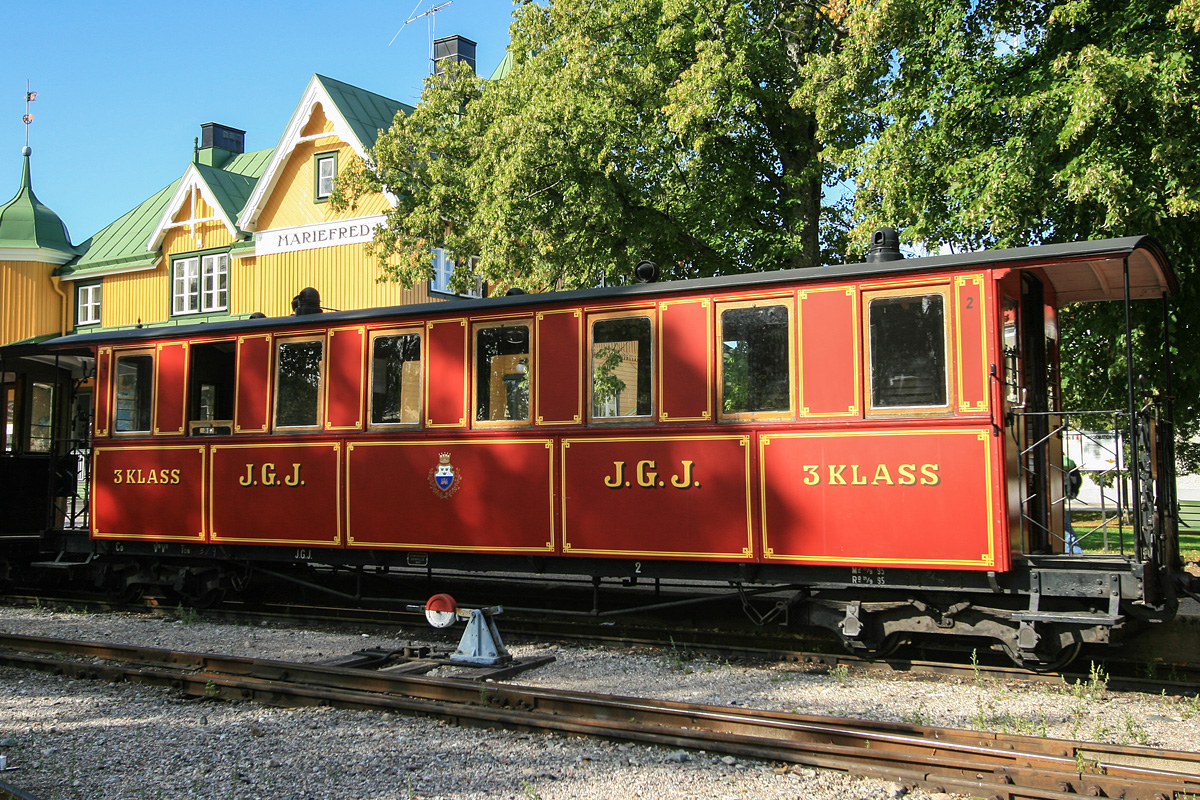
- JGJ Co 2 at Östra Södermanlands Järnväg in Mariefred, built by Vabis in 1893.
- Industry: Rail; Automotive
- Founded: December 1891
- Defunct: 1911
- Fate: Merged with Maskinfabriks-aktiebolaget Scania to create Scania-Vabis
- Headquarters: Södertälje, Sweden
- Brands: Vabis

Vagnfabriks Aktiebolaget i Södertelge (Vabis; lit. 'Wagon Factory Limited Company of Södertälje') was Swedish railway car manufacturer, established in 1891 in Södertälje. Vabis also manufactured petrol engines, automobiles, trucks, motor-powered draisines, motorboats and marine engines. The company was in 1911 merged with Maskinfabriks-aktiebolaget Scania, to form Scania-Vabis, later Scania AB.

== History ==
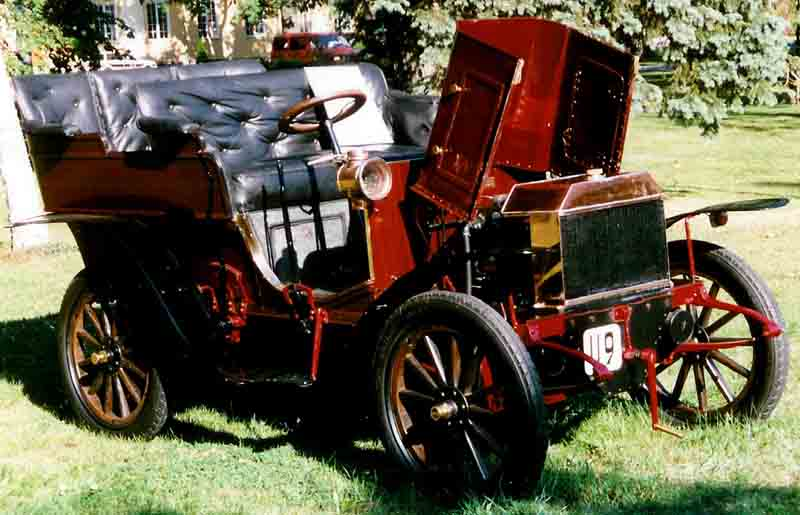
Vabis Tonneau 1903

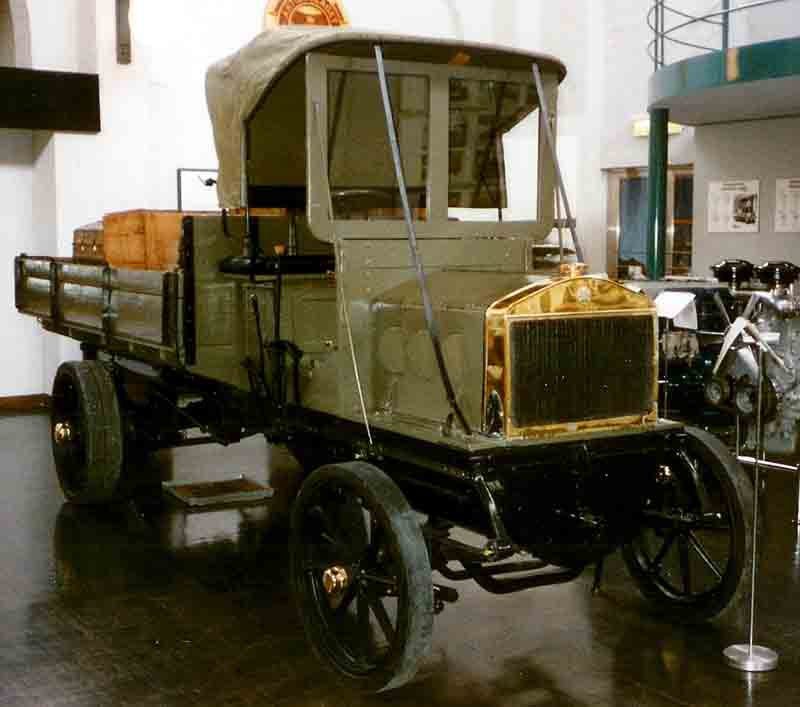
Vabis 2-ton truck 1909

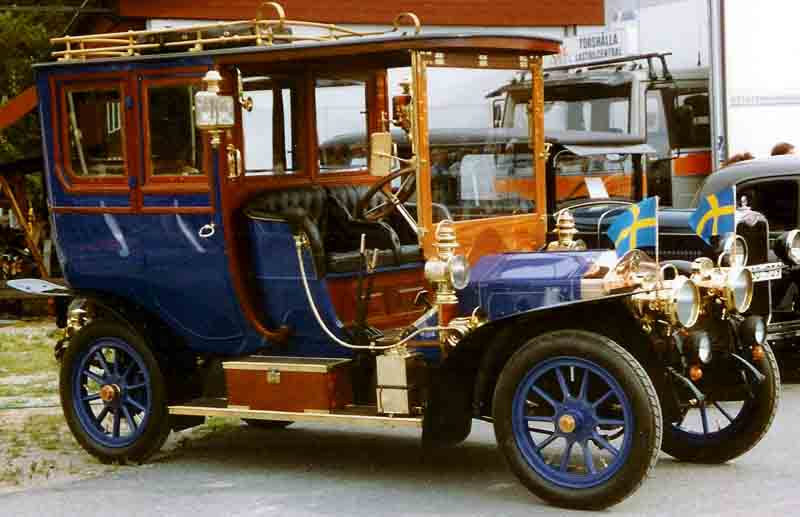
Vabis 2S Limousine 1909

The company was established in December 1891 by steel manufacturer Surahammars Bruk and engineer and entrepreneur Philip Wersén (1854–1940), in what was then known as Södertelge, Södermanland County. Customers for the railway cars were the Swedish State Railways (SJ), Stockholms Spårvägar and other, private railway operators. In 1900, Vabis had a peak year, building a total of 323 carriages. Around 1904, they were allocated to build 150 carriages per year for SJ. The demand for carriages had levelled out, and manufacturers like Vabis needed to find other markets to stay afloat.

The first automobile built related to the company was a four-seater designed by Gustaf Erikson in Surahammar in 1897. Erikson had been hired by Vabis in 1896 to design engines and motorized carriages. Strongly resembling a contemporary carriage, it used a one-cylinder kerosene engine, tiller steering, and was not a success. Erikson replaced it with a tube-ignition four-stroke flat-twin in 1898, mounting it in a horse carriage, which he drove briefly. He then joined Vabis and started building automobiles. The first truck was built in 1902. In December 1903, one of their automobiles was displayed at the auto show in Paris. The same year, they also received the first actual order for a motor vehicle, a rail inspection car for Ystad–Eslövs Järnväg, powered by a one-cylinder 3.5-horsepower engine.

After being used as an abbreviation for the tongue-twisting company name for some time, Vabis was registered as a trademark in 1906. In 1908, a new 3-ton truck with a 20-horsepower engine was developed, winning the gold medal at the Swedish Royal Automobile Club's international truck competition in 1909, but there was no real market for the trucks, selling only five vehicles per year, in comparison to the company's expectance of 50 per year.

Surahammars Bruk kept losing money on the Vabis factory, and tried selling it, with the option of even closing it down if no buyer was found. But a buyer was found in Per Alfred Nordeman, managing director of Malmö-based Maskinfabriks-aktiebolaget Scania, a company with far better success in building automobiles and trucks, and with the need for a partner to build coachwork. An agreement was reached in November 1910, and in 1911 the two companies were merged to create Scania-Vabis, today known as Scania AB. Development and production of engines and light automobiles continued at Vabis' location, while trucks were manufactured in Malmö, together with the headquarters. Headquarters moved to Södertälje in 1912, and truck manufacturing too in the late 1920s.

Examples of Vabis vehicles can be seen at the Scania Museum in the Marcus Wallenberg-hallen in Södertälje.
