= Aleksandr Reva =

Russian footballer

Personal information
- Full name: Aleksandr Valeryevich Reva
- Date of birth: 25 February 1970 (age 56)
- Place of birth: Kurgan, Kurgan Oblast, RSFSR, USSR
- Height: 1.64 m (5 ft 5 in)
- Position: Midfielder

Youth career
- DYuSSh-3 Kurgan

Senior career*
Years	Team	Apps	(Gls)
1988–1989	FC Zauralye Kurgan	47	(2)
1989	FC Yermak Kurgan		
1990–1991	FC Iskra Smolensk	71	(7)
1992–1994	FC Dynamo-Gazovik Tyumen	79	(5)
1995	FC CSK VVS-Kristall Smolensk	37	(2)
1996	FC Irtysh Tobolsk	29	(4)
1997–1998	FC Viktoriya Nazarovo	64	(3)
1999	FC Irtysh Tobolsk	12	(0)
1999–2000	FC Metallurg-Metiznik Magnitogorsk	40	(3)
2001	FC Stroitel Ufa (amateur)		
2001	FC Diana Volzhsk	1	(0)
2002	FC Tobol Kurgan (amateur)		
2003	FC Tobol Kurgan	19	(0)
- * Club domestic league appearances and goals

Aleksandr Valeryevich Reva (Russian: Александр Валерьевич Рева; born 25 February 1970) is a former Russian football player.

== Club career ==
He made his Russian Premier League debut for FC Dynamo-Gazovik Tyumen on 29 April 1992 in a game against FC Tekstilshchik Kamyshin. He also played on the top tier in the 1994 season.
