= Allvelo =

Automotive company

Allvelo (Allmänna Velocipedförsäljnings AB) was a company founded by Fritiof Karlström in Landskrona, Sweden. The company began by importing bicycles, but soon decided to purchase unassembled Waltham Orient buckboards from the United States. These they assembled and sold as All-Velos under the names Allvelo Orient and Allvelo Pansarmobil Sport. Ultimately, it's likely around 50 were assembled. Most parts other than the steering, axles, and engines were made of wood. Each car had a single-cylinder air-cooled engine mounted at the rear, with friction drive. Brakes were fitted on the right rear wheel only, and the cars had tiller steering.

== Other models ==
Other models assembled included the French Orel as the "Allvelo Orel", and a UK-made truck under the name "Allvelo Vulcan". In 1907, they made a prototype car of their own design, but it never entered into production. At most, the company had about 150 employees. The company also marketed a motorcycle.
