= Friction drive =

Mechanical power transmission by friction between components

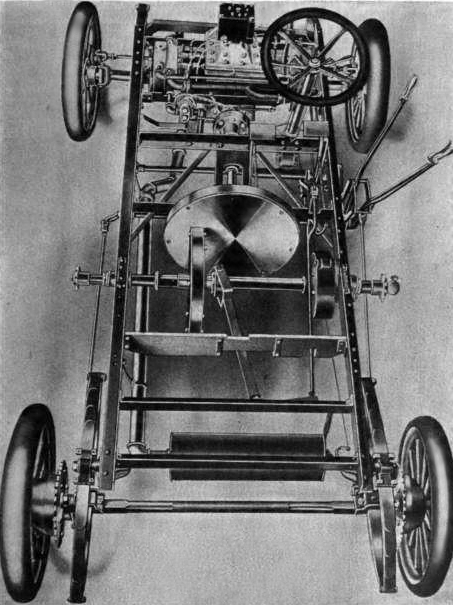
A Lambert automobile from 1906 with the friction drive revealed. The large disk closer to the top is connected to the engine, the smaller one drives the wheels via chains (missing here).

A friction drive or friction engine is a type of transmission that utilises the static friction of two smooth surfaces (instead of contact pressure of meshing teeth) to transfer torque between two rotating parts.

This type of mechanism is also called a traction drive, although this term often refers specifically to drives where a layer of traction fluid (that becomes momentarily solid under pressure) is used to increase the friction coefficient between the two parts, to 0.1 or more.

In general, least one of the two parts is rigid, and it may be any solid of revolution, such as a disk, cylinder, or cone. While the bulk of the rigid part(s) may be constructed of any hard material, such as metal or plastic, at least one of the surfaces where they come into contact usually is coated with some high-friction material, such as hard rubber (or, in early systems, paper or leather).

The most common example of friction drive is a pulley and (smooth) belt pair. However, the name "friction drive" is more often used when both parts are rigid.

== History ==
A friction drive was patented by C. W. Hunt in 1887.

== Parallel cylinders ==
The simplest form of friction drive is a pair of cylinders mounted on parallel axes, pressing against each others.

The mechanical advantage of this system is determined by the ratio r between the radii R_{1} and R_{2} of the two cylinders. Namely, the torques T and T on the two axles will satisfy T_{1}/T_{2} = r = R_{1}/R_{2}, while the rotation speeds ω_{1} and ω_{2} will satisfy ω_{1}/ω_{2} = 1/r = R_{2}/R_{1}.

=== Applications ===
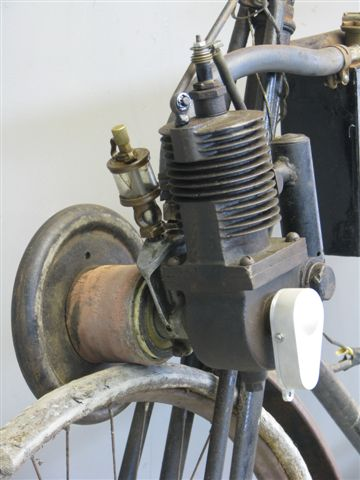
Ixion engine on a Komet motorised bicycle, ca. 1902

This system is used, for example, to drive the spools in some tape recorders. In a typical configuration, one of the cylinders is the axle of an electric motor, say 1 mm in diameter, while the other is a disk with a hard rubber rim, say 50 mm in diameter, yielding a 1:50 mechanical advantage. A gear train with the same ratio would require either much larger gears or very fine teeth, which would be much more expensive and delicate to produce.

Another important application is motorized bicycles, where a rubber-coated roller connected to the motor drives one of the bike wheels by friction. Other examples are add-on motors to operate hand wheels.

== Wheel and track ==
Another important type of friction drive consists of a wheel rolling over a mostly flat surface or mostly straight track. This could be seen as a limiting case of the parallel-cylinder arrangement where one of the cylinders has practically infinite radius. In this case the goal is not to transfer torque but to convert torque into linear force, and the rotary motion of the wheel to relative linear motion of the two parts.

=== Applications ===
The most common example is of course wheeled vehicles traveling on roads or railway tracks. But the same arrangement is also used in many other applications, such as conveyor belts and roller coasters.

== Perpendicular disks ==
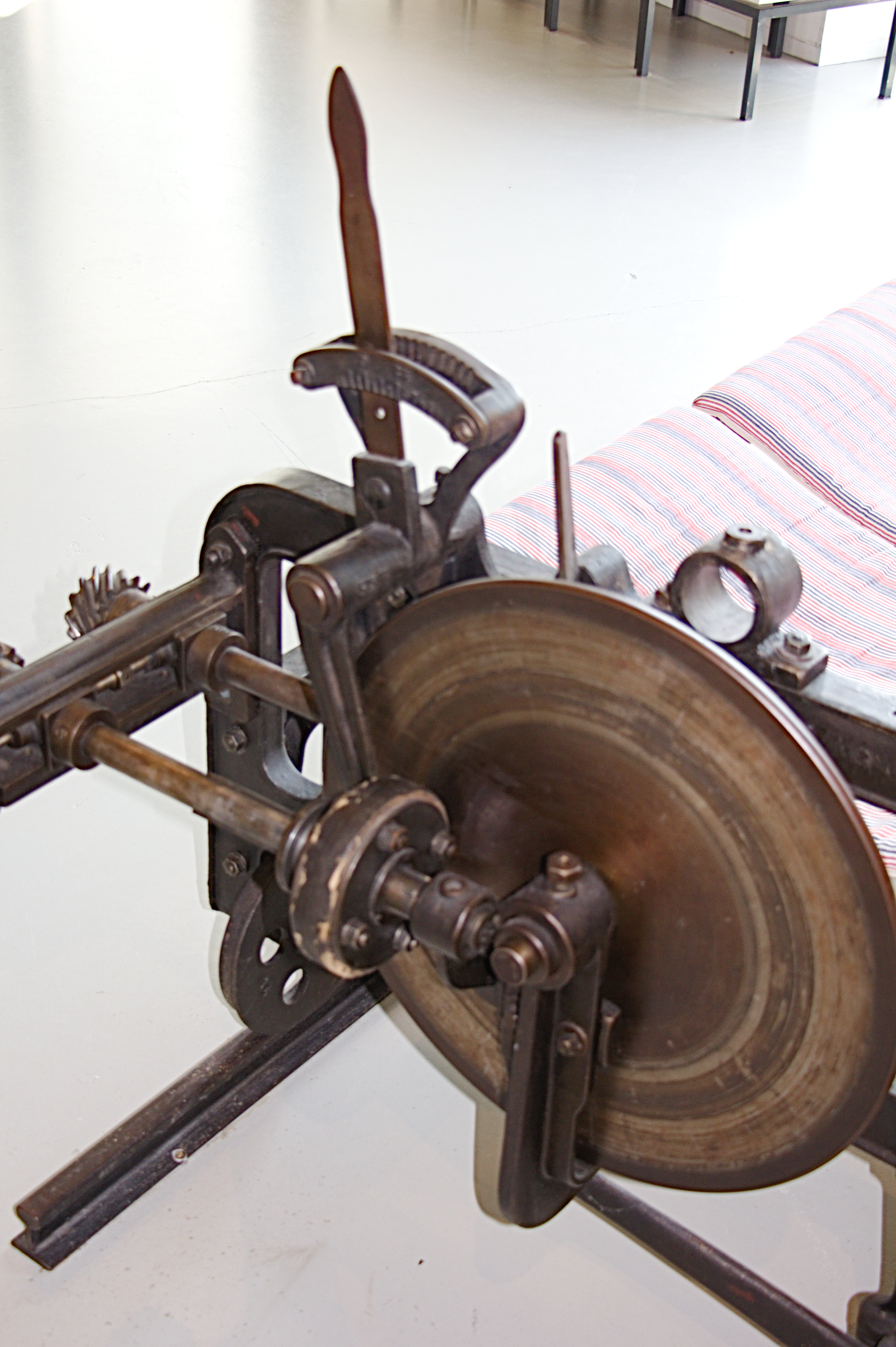
Friction drive on a textile machine.

Another important type of friction drive consists of two discs with perpendicular axes, arranged so that the edge of one wheel presses against the flat face of the other. Friction between the two wheels causes torque applied to one wheel to be transferred to the other.

The mechanical advantage of the system is determined by the ratio r between the radius R_{1} of the first wheel and the distance R_{2} on the second wheel between its axis and the point of contact. If the first disk is mounted so that it can slide along its shaft, the radius R_{2}, and therefore the ratio r, can be varied continuously even while the disks are rotating. The system is then a continuously variable transmission.

One problem with this design is that the inner and outer edges of the first disk are moving at the same speed, but the speed on the surface of the second disk increases proportionally with distance from the axis. This speed mismatch causes considerable friction at the edges of the first disk, wearing it out and wasting mechanical power as heat. Since these effects are proportional to the contact pressure and to the relative speed of the rubbing surfaces, they limit the torque and rotational speed that can be transferred.

This kind of friction drive was once employed in early automobiles, but today the system is most commonly used on scooters, particularly go-peds, as a substitute for a chain and gear system. It is mechanically identical to a ball-and-disk integrator, but is designed to handle higher torque levels.

== Applications ==
Friction drive has been most successfully used in low-power applications, such as driving phonograph turntables.

=== Automobiles ===
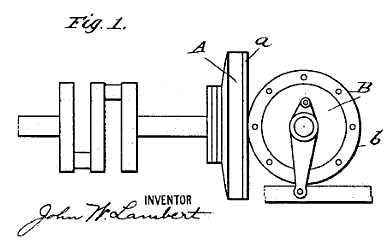
Lambert friction drive transmission. Patent 761384

Automobiles using this drive system included the Anglo-Dane, the Arista, the Armadale, the Astra, the Allvelo, the Bukh & Gry, the Cartercar, the Crown 12HP Model Two (1905–1906), the Davis Totem, the G.W.K., the Kelsey, the Lambert, the LuLu, the Metz, the Ner-a Car, the Richardson, and the Turicum. The Turicum's friction drive consisted of a flat steel disk coupled directly to the engine. This primary disk subsequently drove a smaller leather covered wheel oriented normal to its surface. Assuming a constant rotational velocity on the primary wheel, the angular velocity on the disk's surface will increase proportionally to the distance from the center of rotation. Therefore, positioning the smaller wheel at different points along the larger wheel's surface varies the gear ratio. Furthermore, since there are no limitations beyond the minimum and maximum positions, the gear ratios are infinitely adjustable. The Lambert's friction drive (illustrated) was similar but used an aluminium-faced driving disk and a fiber-faced driven wheel.

=== Locomotives ===
Plymouth Locomotive Works's first three models, the AL, BL and CL were equipped with a friction drive.

Early models of the permanent way maintenance ganger's Wickham trolley used a vee-twin JAP engine. This drove through a large flat flywheel and a friction drive.

== Comparison with other drives ==
While mechanically simple, friction drives have a number of limitations. The first is that the amount of torque that can be transferred is a function of the area of the contact patch between the two members and the pressure applied to it by the two parts. Increasing either parameter increases the maximum transmitted torque, but also increases losses due to friction and local deformation of the material at the contact.

Friction drives also suffer from slippage when overloaded, as the static friction limit is reached. They also accumulate small amounts of slippage in normal operation because local deformation of the surface changes the effective radius of the part. Thus they cannot be used for precise rotational positioning, unless the motor uses some feedback scheme to compensate for those errors.

On the other hand, there are applications where slippage is desired, as it prevents damage to the mechanism in case of overload.

== See also ==
- Contact mechanics – Study of the deformation of solids that touch each other
- Frictional contact mechanics – Study of the deformation of bodies in the presence of frictional effects
- Adhesion railway – Railway relying on adhesion to move trains
- Rolling (metalworking) – Metal forming process
- Toroidal or roller-based CVT (Extroid CVT) – Automotive transmission technology
- Tribology – Science of rubbing surfaces
