= Ottmar Beckmann Cars =

Car manufacturer in Mantorp, Sweden

- Industry: Automotive Manufacturing
- Headquarters: Mantorp, Sweden

OBC (sometimes called BCS for Beckmann Cars Sweden AB) or Ottmar Beckmann Cars AB was a car manufacturer in Mantorp, Sweden. In 1974 they presented a two seated mid-engined sports car called OBC Mantorp (named after the Mantorp Park race track). The design was somewhat similar to the Lotus Elan, but with a more rounded front. It was powered by a BMW engine mated to a Porsche gearbox. Both the chassis and bodywork was in fibreglass. The company planned a production rate of five a day with 100 employees, but it never entered production. Beckmann had tried to make sports cars in the Netherlands previously.
