= Svenska Automobilfabriken =

- Industry: Automotive
- Founded: December 1919; 106 years ago in Bollnäs, Sweden
- Defunct: 1921
- Fate: Bankruptcy

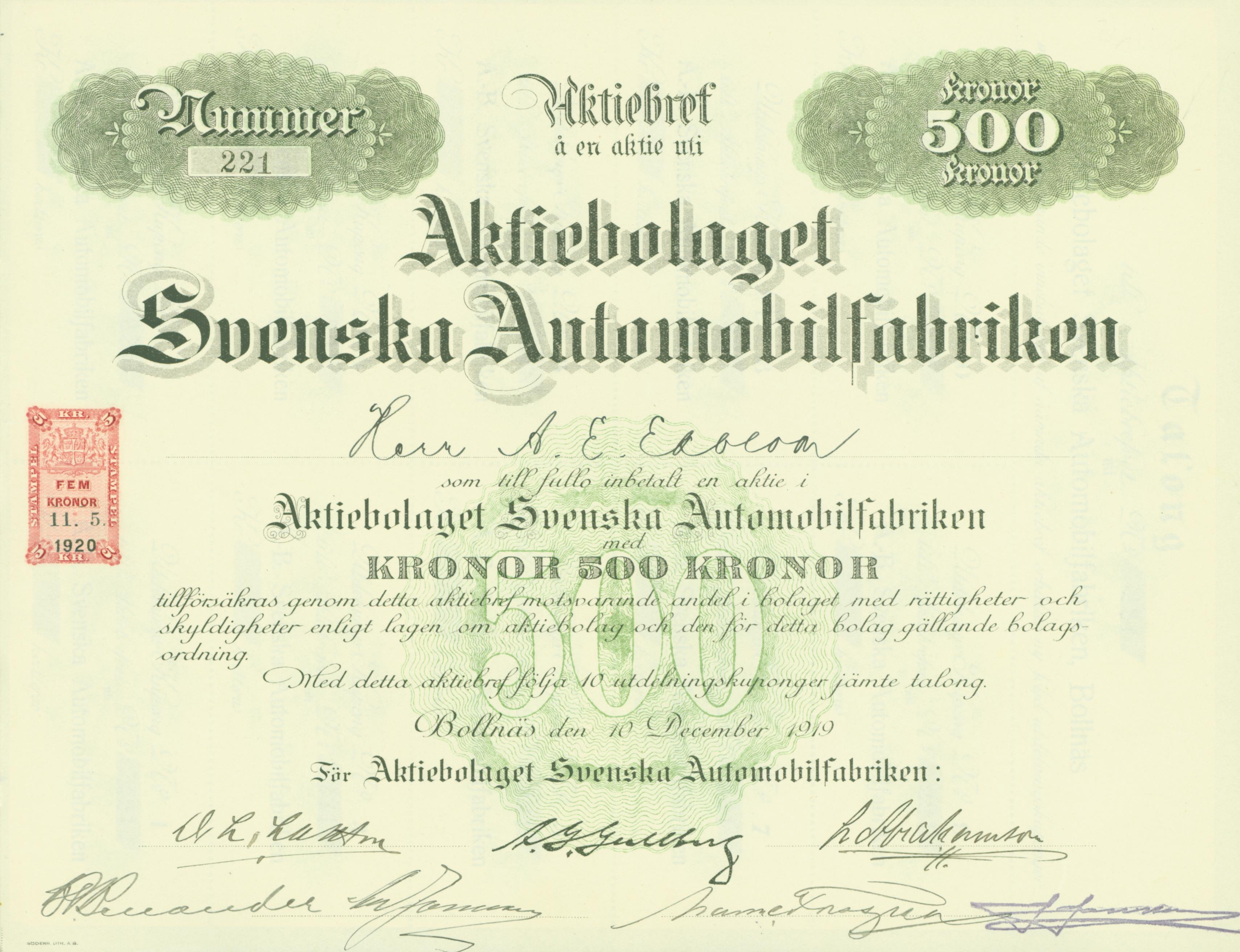
Share of the AB Svenska Automobilfabriken, issued 10. December 1919

Svenska Automobilfabriken (SAF) was a Swedish car manufacturer founded in Bollnäs in December 1919. It assembled US cars based on Pullman Motor Co chassis bought when Pullman went bankrupt in 1917, and fitted them with coachworks and adapted them for Swedish conditions. The engine was a Golden, Belknapp & Swartz giving 32 hp. It was fitted with a Stromberg carburettor and had a 50-litre gasoline tank. People who earlier had worked on Rengsjöbilen were among the employees. SAF bought 40 Pullman chassis, and built 28 SAF cars before the company went bankrupt in 1921. The remaining stock (with or without bodywork) was sold out over a few years.
