= Kelsey (automobile company) =

Kelsey was used as an automobile marque by Cadwallader Washburn Kelsey from 1897 in Philadelphia, Pennsylvania

== History ==
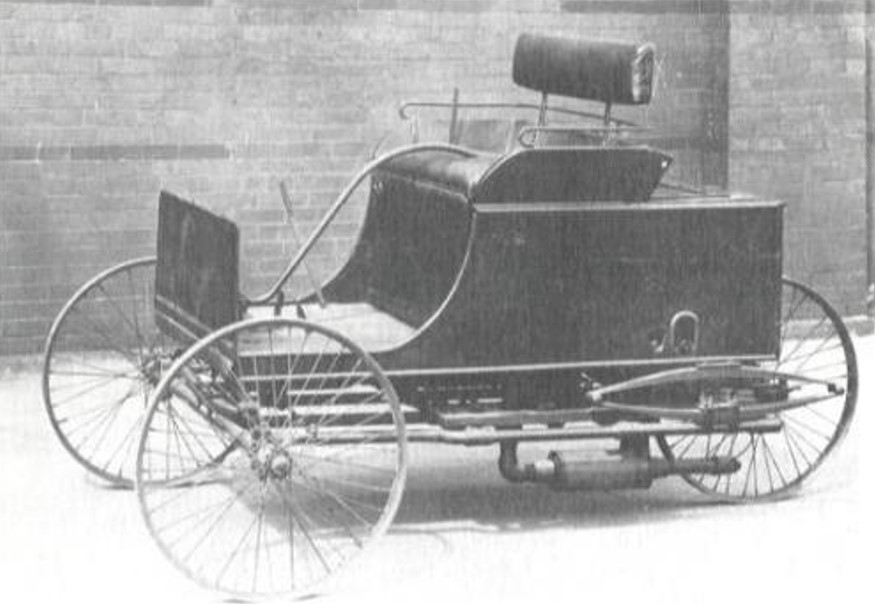
1899 Auto-Tri built by Carl Kelsey and Sheldon Tilney - Horseless Age Magazine

In 1897, Cadwallader "Carl" Kelsey, at the age of 17, built his first car. It was a small four-wheel car. In 1899, while at Haverford College, he built his second car with a friend named Sheldon Tilney. It had a 5-hp single-cylinder Buffalo Gasolene Motor Co. engine and only three wheels. They called it an Auto-Tri. They decided to go into full manufacturing, but their fathers thought the automobile was an "instrument of the devil" and so sent the two young men back to studying at college. The Kelsey and Tilney Auto-Tri was given to the Smithsonian Institution in 1923.

In 1901 Kelsey built another car this time with four wheels and two-cylinders. After graduating from college, his father gave him money for a service shop in Germantown so he would stop making cars. He became a dealer for Autocar and in 1902, he built his last car in Philadelphia, a four-cylinder car.

Kelsey bought the Philadelphia dealership for the Maxwell, and after record sales he was hired in 1905 as Sales Manager for Maxwell-Briscoe. During his time as Sales Manager, Maxwell became the third largest manufacturer of automobiles. He left in 1909 to develop his own version of a low price car.

== Kelsey Motorette ==
Motorette
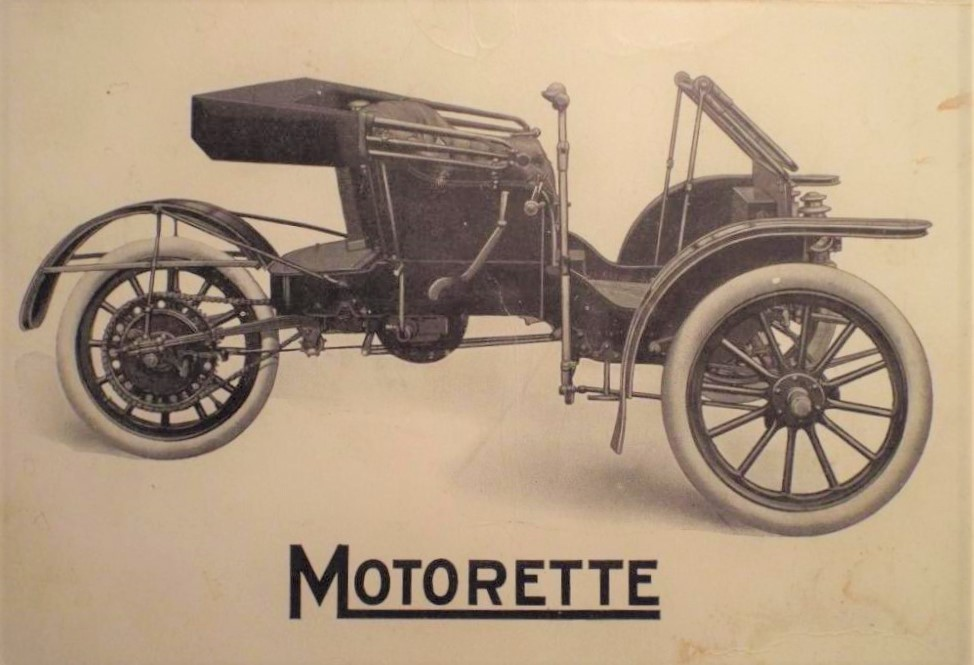
- 1910 Motorette Brochure Cover

Overview
- Type: Automobiles
- Manufacturer: C. W. Kelsey Manufacturing Company
- Production: 1910 - 1914; 112 years ago
- Assembly: Hartford, Connecticut, United States
- Designer: C. W. Kelsey

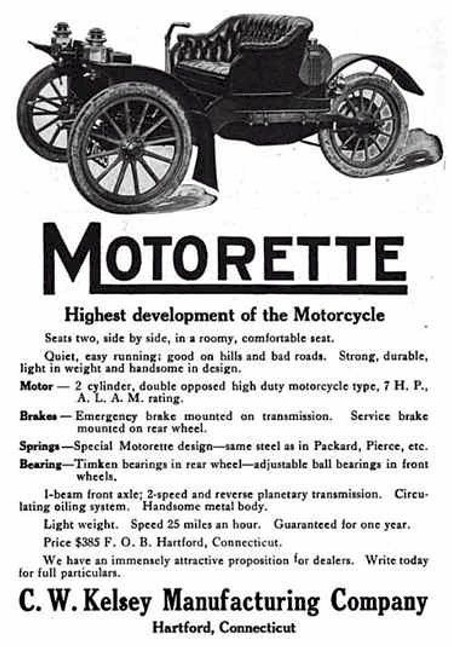
1911 Kelsey Motorette Advertisement in Cycle and Automobile Trade Journal

Carl Kelsey designed an automobile that would be less expensive than the Model T. Introduced in September 1910, the three-wheel vehicle was the Motorette, built in Hartford, Connecticut. The Motorette (a name that he trademarked), was rear-wheel driven by a two-stroke, twin-cylinder engine which was air-cooled on early models. Later models were water-cooled, with the radiator mounted behind the engine.

With a 74-inch wheelbase, it weighed 700 pounds and was advertised with the slogan "No roads too rough, no hills too high." and was priced at $385, equivalent to $13,303 in 2025.

The Kelsey's two-stroke oil and gasoline were supplied separately, with the oil supplied by a tank in the armrest to a four-way distribution center at the front of the driver's seat. Kelsey designed one of the first anti-sway torsion bars to make it safer. This stabilizer rod was mounted cross-ways in the front and connected to the ends of the axle. This forced both front springs to work up and down together and kept the car frame parallel to the road surface.

To help promote his vehicle, Kelsey was active in early endurance events. In 1909, he drove an air-cooled model up Mount Washington. After the car overheated and Kelsey had to spend the night in a halfway house, he changed to a water-cooled engine. In 1911, Kelsey's brother-in-law and a mechanic drove a Kelsey Motorette from the factory in Hartford, Connecticut, across the country, and to San Francisco, CA. The trip lasted from February until August.

Some engines built by Lycoming factory workers were sabotaged, and this caused Kelsey financial issues. Production ended in 1914. About 210 Motorettes were produced.

== Kelsey Motor Company ==
Kelsey
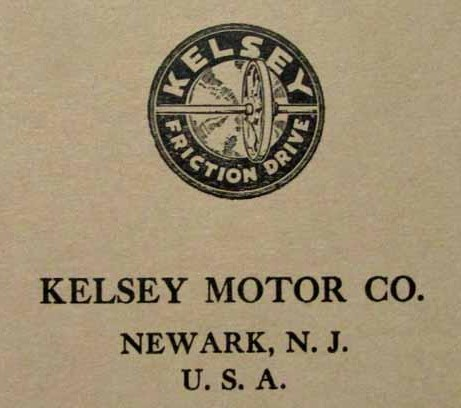

Overview
- Type: Automobiles
- Manufacturer: Kelsey Motor Company
- Production: 1920-1924
- Assembly: Belleville, New Jersey
- Designer: C. W. Kelsey

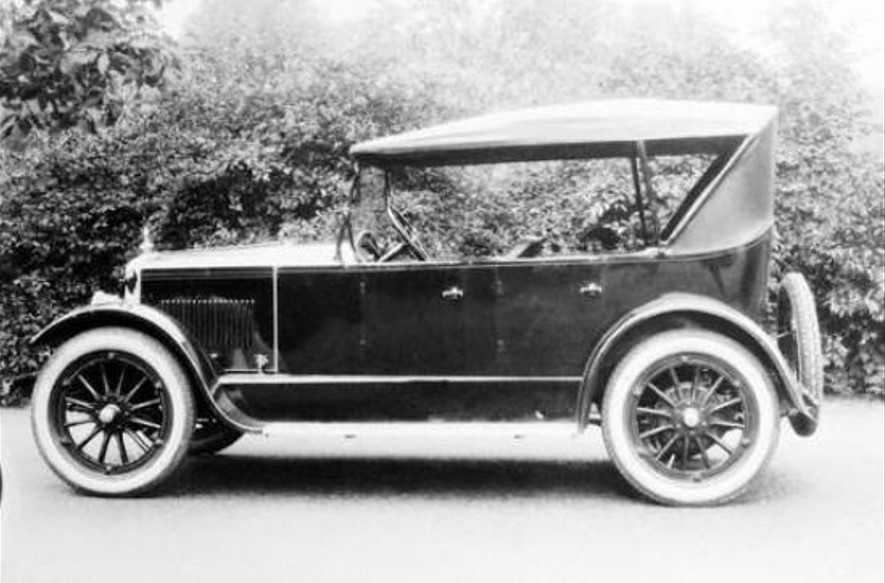
Factory Photograph of 1923 Kelsey Touring Car

In 1916, Carl Kelsey built two prototypes to develop an improved friction-drive transmission. Kelsey's friction-drive differed from earlier examples in that it was enclosed and shaft driven, rather than using a chain driven version. World War I delayed his plans, but in 1919, Kelsey started up the Kelsey Motor Company in Newark, New Jersey. With the friction-drive, advertisements claimed huge saving in running and fuel costs. The friction-drive cars did not sell well and a sliding gear transmission replaced it by 1922. The company went into receivership and was reorganized in 1923. In 1924, a group of attorneys forced his company into bankruptcy. About 601 Kelseys were built.

=== Models ===
Model(year)	Engine	HP	Wheelbase
GW(1920-1921)	6-cylinder	46	116 in (2,946 mm)
1922	6-cylinder	46	119.5 in (3,035 mm)
G(1923-1924)	4-Cylinder	35	111 in (2,819 mm)

C. W. Kelsey, in 1930, became the distributor for the Siemens rotary tilling machine, improved it and in 1932 established The Rototiller Company in New York City. He retired as President in 1960 and was still inventing and tinkering when he died in May, 1970.

== See also ==
- 1911 Kelsey at ConceptCarz.com
- Fountainhead Museum Kelsey Motorette
- WebArchive.org - American Automobiles - Kelsey
