= Reva (Swedish car) =

Reva (according to some sources Reeva) was a series of cars made by Dan Werbin and Holger Brånby at Reva gård in Sweden in the mid-1960s. They were two seated coupé mid engined sports cars . The first one built in 1964, the Reva GT, was made with a fibreglass body on a VW Beetle chassis. It was followed by the Reva GT Mk1 powered with a VW 1200 engine and fitted with Porsche brakes. Three Mk1s were made. The Mk II model had more rounded shapes, but still used the VW Beetle chassis. The company produced and sold about 20 bodies, but no complete cars. For the 1968 Mk III they wanted to produce a more finished car. The body was made lower and wider and they no longer used the Beetle chassis, but had a custom made chassis made of steel tubes. The prototype was powered by a 3.5 litre Buick V8, the next was fitted with a 5.4 litre Chevrolet Corvette engine and number three had a 5.41 litre Oldsmobile V8. Then the rules for amateur built vehicles in Sweden changed and they had to end production.

Dan Werbin was hired by Volvo in 1970. In 1973 he became head of product planning at Volvo of America. He also worked on Volvo trucks and some of Volvo's concept cars like the Volvo VESC.
