= Luvly =

Swedish electric vehicle manufacturer

Luvly AB
- Industry: Automotive
- Founded: 2015; 11 years ago
- Founder: Håkan Lutz; Björn Lindblom; David Egertz
- Headquarters: Stockholm, Sweden

Luvly AB is a Swedish automotive tech supplier and automotive manufacturer based in Stockholm. Founded in 2015, it specializes in tech for efficient design and production of lightweight electric vehicles.

== History ==
In 2015, three Swedish entrepreneurs from Stockholm, Håkan Lutz, Björn Lindblom and David Egertz, founded the Luvly startup focused on the development of electric vehicle technologies targeted at European metropolises.

After 8 years of construction work and tests, at the end of April 2023, the company presented a prototype of a small 2-seater, the Luvly O hatchback. With an unusual concept drawing the attention of global media to a small, previously unreported Swedish company. The 2.7-meter vehicle was developed with lightweight components allowing for a low total weight of 380 kilograms. The 100-kilometer range is to be provided by a 6.4 kWh battery, which can be removed and charged from a 220-230 V home socket. The stiff sandwich composite chassis and safety cell is fitted with auxiliary energy absorbing foam blocks to increase passenger safety.

An unusual concept adopted by manufacturer regarding the planned mass production of the future Luvly O is the desire to send unfinished cars in packaged sets from the main production plant. These are to be assembled later by micro-factories located in strategic locations. The media perceived this idea as an analogy to how furniture sales work in the Swedish Ikea store. This policy, combined with a simple and lightweight design, will allow the sale of serial Luvly for a price of approximately EUR 10,000 if the company manages to implement the project into production. Lightweight prefabricated elements are also supposed to be easy to replace in the event of damage. The company plans to collect orders by the end of 2023.

In March 2025 a partnership was established between Luvly AB and the automotive conglomerate Stellantis. In March 2025 Luvly AB was in the process of raising 5 million euros in equity to continue expanding.

== Products ==
- Luvly 0 (2023)
