= List of weapons of the Rhodesian Bush War =

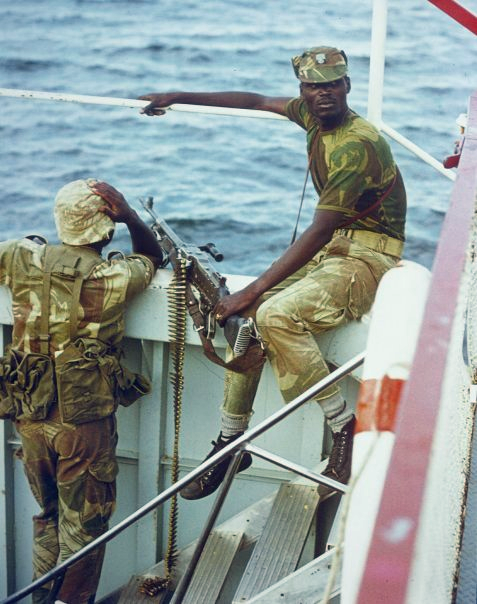
Two black soldiers of the Rhodesian African Rifles (RAR) manning a FN MAG General-purpose machine gun (GPMG) aboard a patrol boat on Lake Kariba, December 1976.

The Rhodesian Bush War, also referred to as the Rhodesian Civil War, Zimbabwe Independence War or Zimbabwean War of Liberation, as well as the Second Chimurenga, was a military conflict staged during the Decolonisation of Africa that pitted the military and police forces loyal to the Rhodesian white minority-led government of Prime-minister Ian Smith (later the Zimbabwe-Rhodesian government of Bishop Abel Muzorewa) against the guerrilla forces of the African nationalist Liberation movements in the unrecognised country of Rhodesia (later Zimbabwe-Rhodesia), between 1965 and 1979. Main combatants comprised:

- The Rhodesian Security Forces (RhSF) were the official armed defence and internal security forces of Rhodesia from 1963 to 1980. Subordinated to the Ministry of Defence of the Rhodesian government at the national capital Salisbury and placed since May 1977 under the command of a Combined Operations headquarters (commonly referred to as "COMOPS" or "ComOps"), whose Commander of Combined Operations exercised operational control over all RhSF branches (including the Army's special forces), they were organized as follows:
  - The Rhodesian Army
  - The Rhodesian Air Force (RhAF)
  - The British South Africa Police (BSAP, known informally as "The Regiment")
  - The Rhodesia Prison Service (RPS)
  - The Ministry of Internal Affairs (INTAF)
  - The Guard Force
  - The Security Force Auxiliaries (SFAs)
- The African nationalist guerrilla movements of the Patriotic Front political and military alliance (1976–1980):
  - The Zimbabwe African National Union (ZANU) party (1963–1975; as ZANU-PF: 1976–present), and its military wing the Zimbabwe African National Liberation Army (ZANLA), which received support from the People's Republic of China, North Korea, East Germany, Czechoslovakia, the Socialist Republic of Romania, SFR Yugoslavia, Algeria, Egypt, Libya, Ethiopia, Ghana, Uganda, Tanzania, Zambia and the People's Republic of Mozambique (from 1975).
  - The Zimbabwe African People's Union (ZAPU) party (1961–1987; 2008–present), and its military wing the Zimbabwe People's Revolutionary Army (ZIPRA), which received support from the Soviet Union, the People's Republic of China, East Germany, Czechoslovakia, the Hungarian People's Republic, the People's Republic of Bulgaria, Cuba, Algeria, Egypt, Libya, Ghana, Botswana, Zambia and the People's Republic of Angola (from 1975).
- Other belligerents involved in the War:
  - The South African Police (SAP), which deployed 12 Counter-Insurgency companies (SAPCOIN or SA PATU) to Rhodesia between 1967 and 1975 in support of the Rhodesian Security Forces, providing security to sectors of the Country's northern border. In addition, the South African Air Force (SAAF) and the South African Defence Force's (SADF) Paratrooper and Special Forces units operated covertly in Rhodesia from 1967 to 1980 in close cooperation with the Rhodesian Special Air Service (SAS).
  - The South African African National Congress (ANC) party (1912–present), and its military wing the uMkhonto we Sizwe ("Spear of the Nation"; abbreviated MK), which operated in Rhodesia between 1966 and 1968, received support from Algeria, Egypt, Ghana, Tanzania, East Germany, Czechoslovakia, Cuba, the Soviet Union and the People's Republic of China. The ANC/MK was closely allied with ZIPRA and in August 1967 they organised a failed joint expedition into Rhodesia by crossing the Zambezi River from Zambia, which was countered by Operation Nickel, launched by the Rhodesian Security Forces with clandestine military assistance from South Africa.
  - The Liberation Front of Mozambique (Portuguese: Frente de Libertação de Moçambique – FRELIMO) party (1962–present), and its military wing the Popular Forces for the Liberation of Mozambique (Portuguese: Forças Populares de Libertação de Moçambique – FPLM), which received support from the Soviet Union, East Germany, the People's Republic of Bulgaria, Czechoslovakia, Poland, SFR Yugoslavia, Sweden, Norway, Denmark, the Netherlands, Cuba, the People's Republic of China, Algeria, Libya, Egypt, Republic of the Congo, Tanzania and Zambia.
  - The Mozambican National Resistance (Portuguese: Resistência Nacional Moçambicana – RENAMO) Mozambican anti-communist guerrilla movement (1977–present), made of political dissidents opposed to Mozambique's ruling FRELIMO party. They were recruited, organized, trained and supported by the Rhodesian Central Intelligence Organisation (CIO) and the Rhodesian Special Air Service (SAS) in 1976, who often used them for external reconnaissance missions in Mozambique between 1977 and 1980.

An eclectic variety of weapons was used by all sides in the Rhodesian Bush War. The Rhodesian Security Forces were equipped with a mix of Western-made weapon systems from World War II and more modern military equipment, mainly British in origin, but also included Portuguese, Spanish, French, Belgian, West German, American, Brazilian and South African military hardware. Following the Rhodesia's unilateral declaration of independence in 1965, and the institution by the United Nations of mandatory trade sanctions between December 1966 and April 1968, which required member states to cease all trade and economic links with Rhodesia, severely restricted purchases of military hardware suitable for Counter-insurgency operations. While South Africa and Portugal (until 1974) gave economic, military and limited political support to the post-UDI government, Rhodesia was also heavily reliant on international smuggling operations, commonly referred to as "sanction-busting", in which other armaments and non-lethal military supplies were secretly purchased (often with a third country acting as broker) from West Germany, Austria, France, Belgium, the Netherlands, Italy, Israel, Brazil, Iran (until 1979), the Philippines, South Vietnam (until 1975), Taiwan, Japan, Bermuda and Grenada, and smuggled to Rhodesia via clandestine air freighting through Oman, Iran, Gabon and the Comoros. Such illegally-purchased weaponry was complemented by the use of captured enemy arms and munitions late in the war, seized in the course of the Rhodesian Security Forces' own cross-border covert raids ("externals") against ZIPRA and ZANLA guerrilla bases in the neighbouring countries.

Unexpectedly, the UN sanctions provided the impetus for a shift towards the establishment of a domestic arms industry in Rhodesia. With South African technical assistance, the Rhodesians developed in coordination with the private sector their own military manufacturing capacity and began producing substitutes for items which could not be easily imported or were unaffordable in the international Black market. By the late 1970s, Rhodesia was producing an impressive array of military hardware, including automatic firearms, anti-personnel and anti-vehicle mines, bombs, mortars and a wide range of unique Mine and Ambush Protected (MAP) vehicles, which used commercial running gear to meet the specific requirements of the warfare being waged.

During the early phase of the War, the African nationalist guerrilla movements were largely equipped with WWII-vintage Western and Eastern arms and munitions, though as the war went on, more modern Soviet, Eastern Bloc and Chinese weaponry began to play a major role, particularly after 1972. The African host countries that provided sanctuary to ZIPRA and ZANLA, mainly Tanzania, Zambia, Angola and Mozambique, served as conduits for arms shipments coming from the sponsor countries, although the guerrillas themselves made use of captured enemy stocks (which included small-arms and land mines) and they were able to manufacture some of their own anti-personnel mines, anti-vehicle roadside bombs and other home-made explosive devices.

== Rhodesian Security Forces equipment ==
=== Revolvers ===
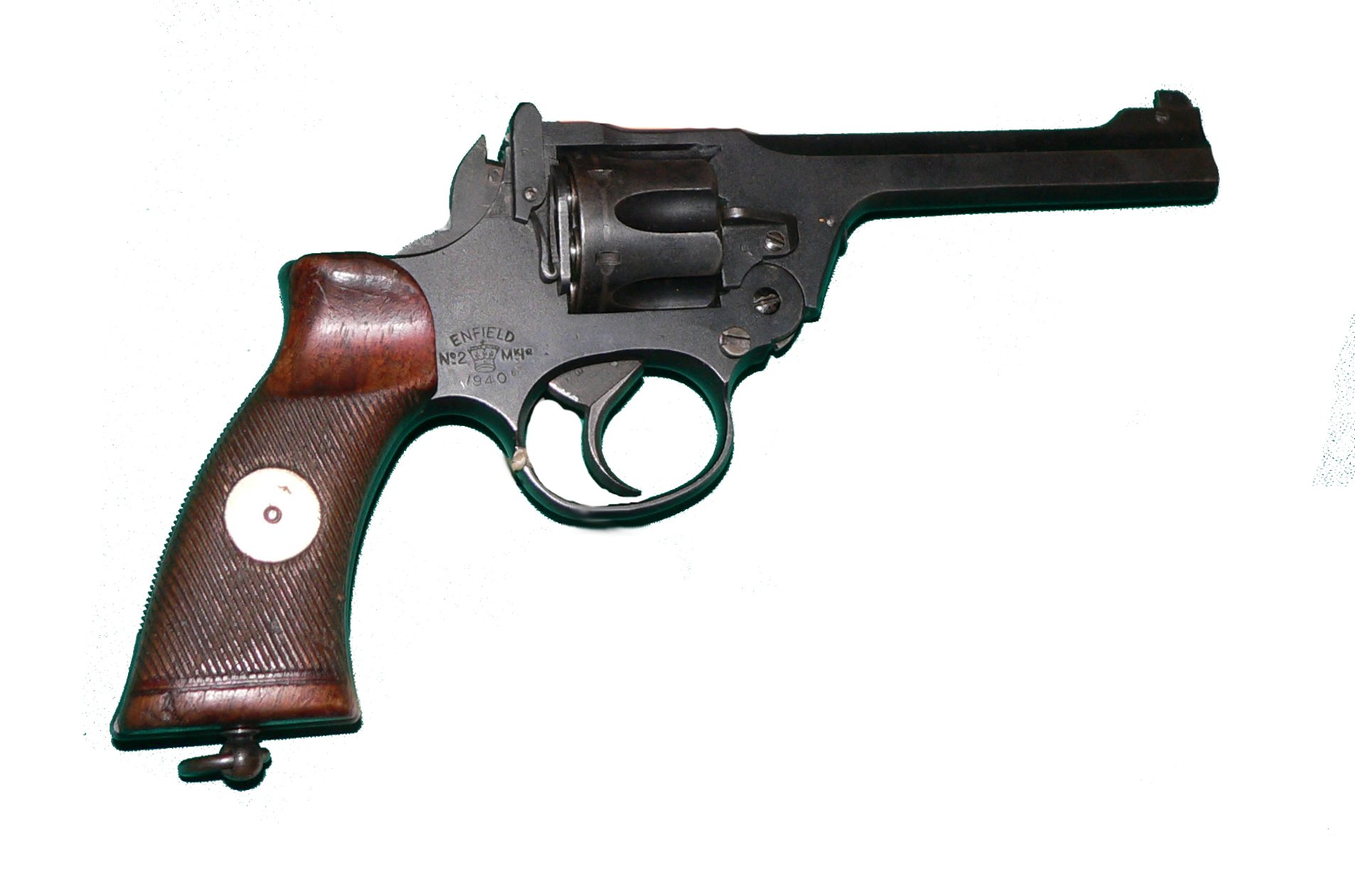
Enfield No. 2 Mk I Revolver.

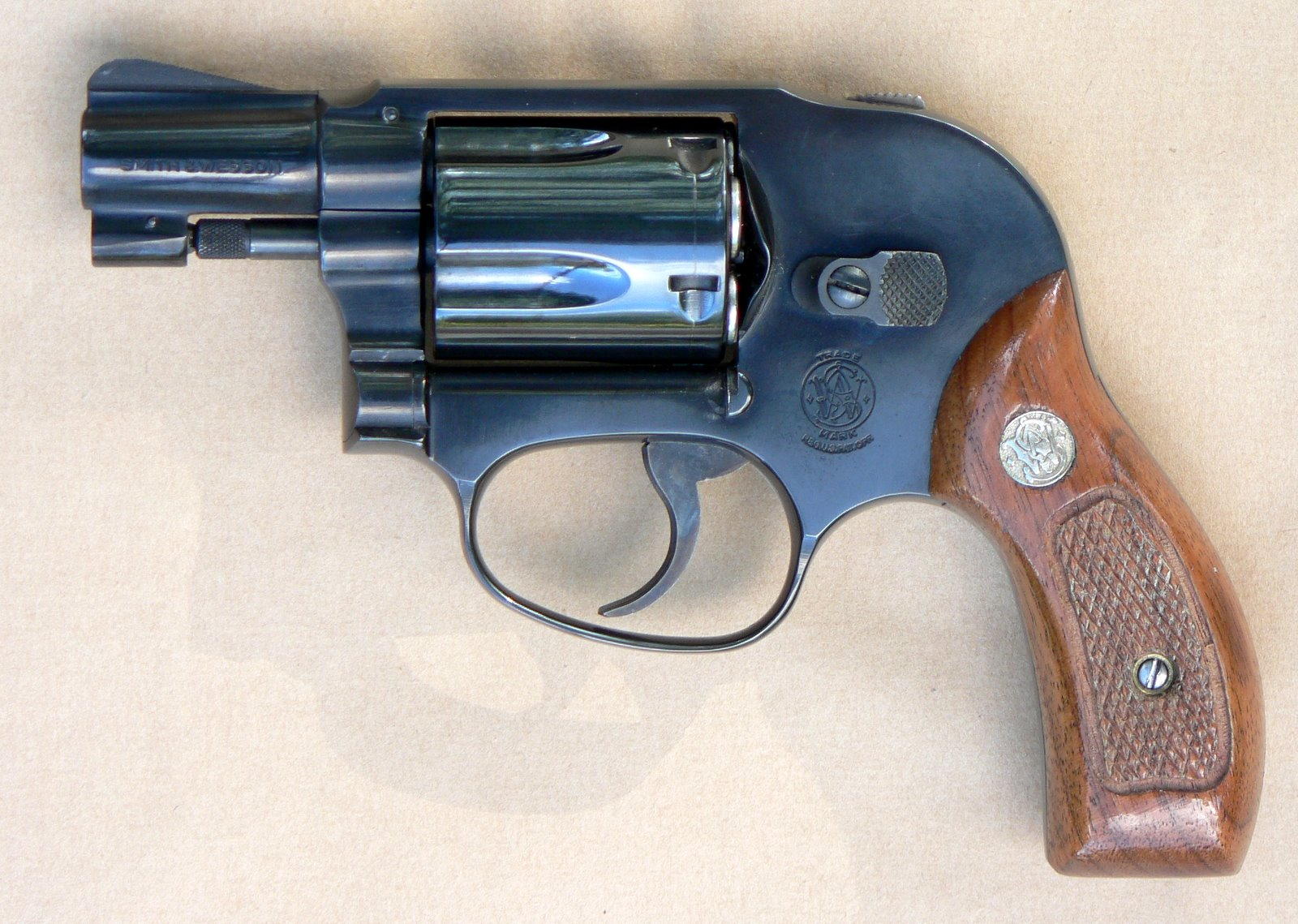
Smith & Wesson Model 49 Bodyguard .38 Special.

- Enfield No. 2 Mk I Revolver: used early in the War by the BSAP.
- Webley Mk. VI .38: used by the BSAP.
- Smith & Wesson Model 49 Bodyguard .38 Special: used late in the War by civilians.

=== Pistols ===
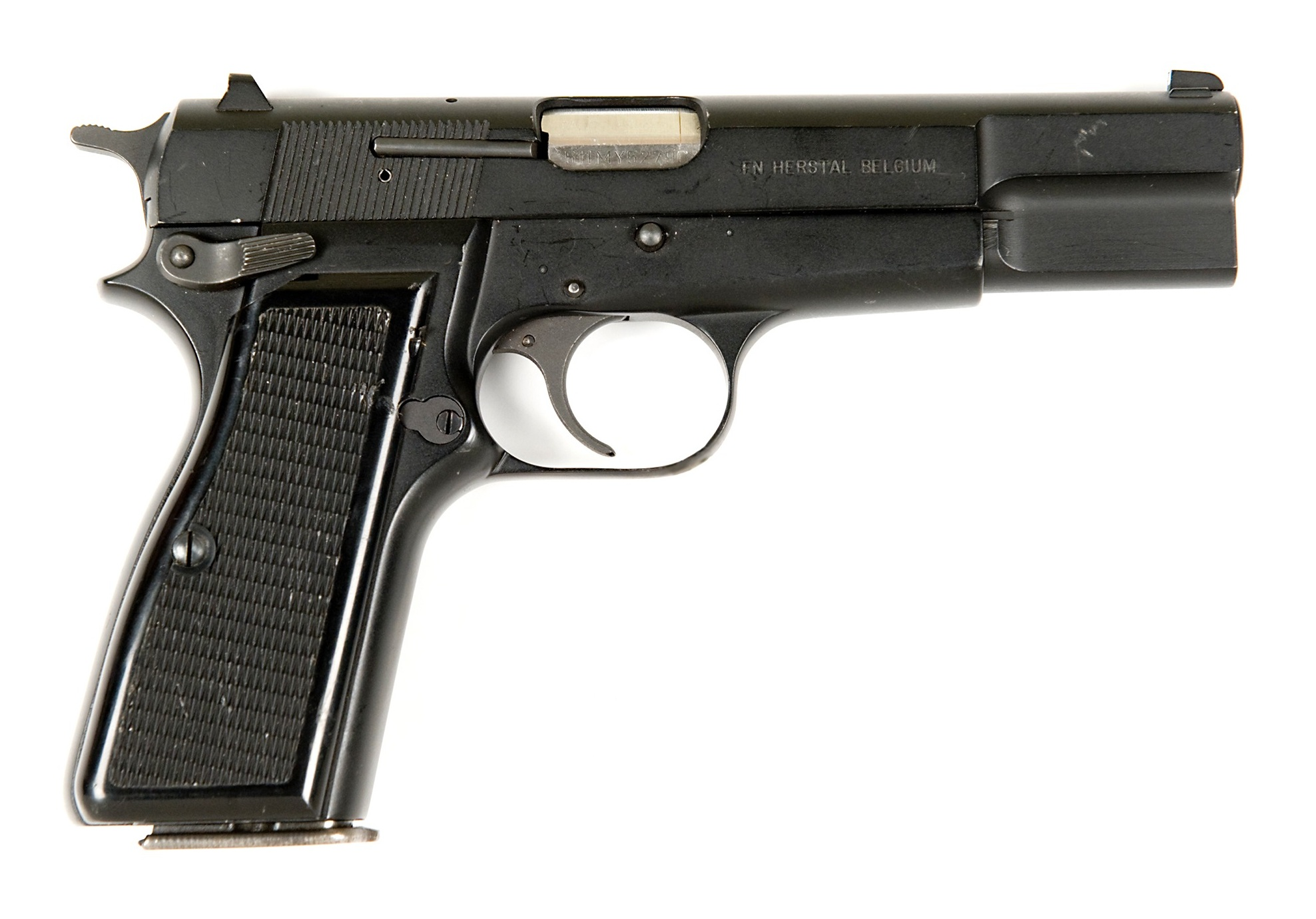
Browning Hi-Power.

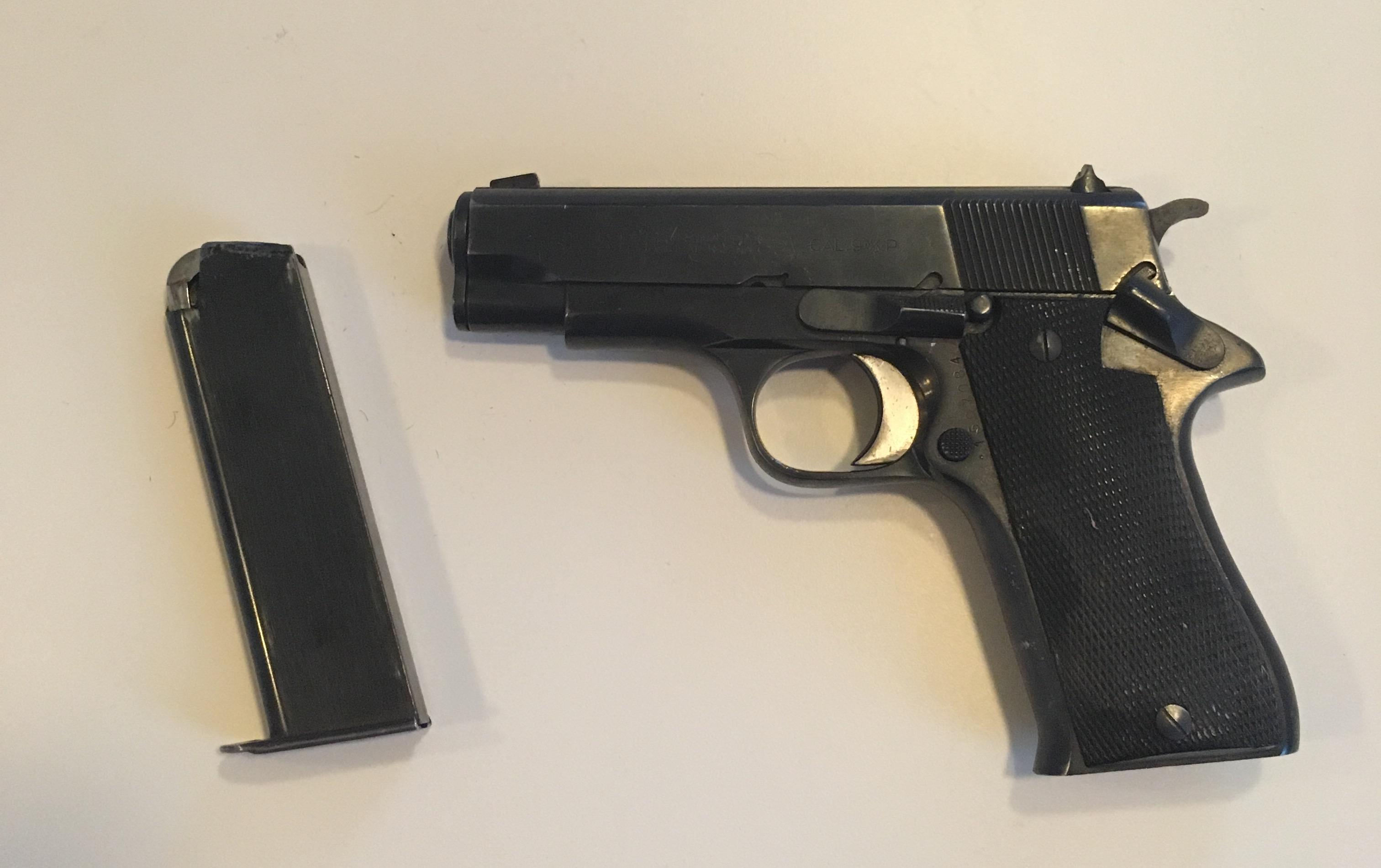
An unloaded Star Model BM.

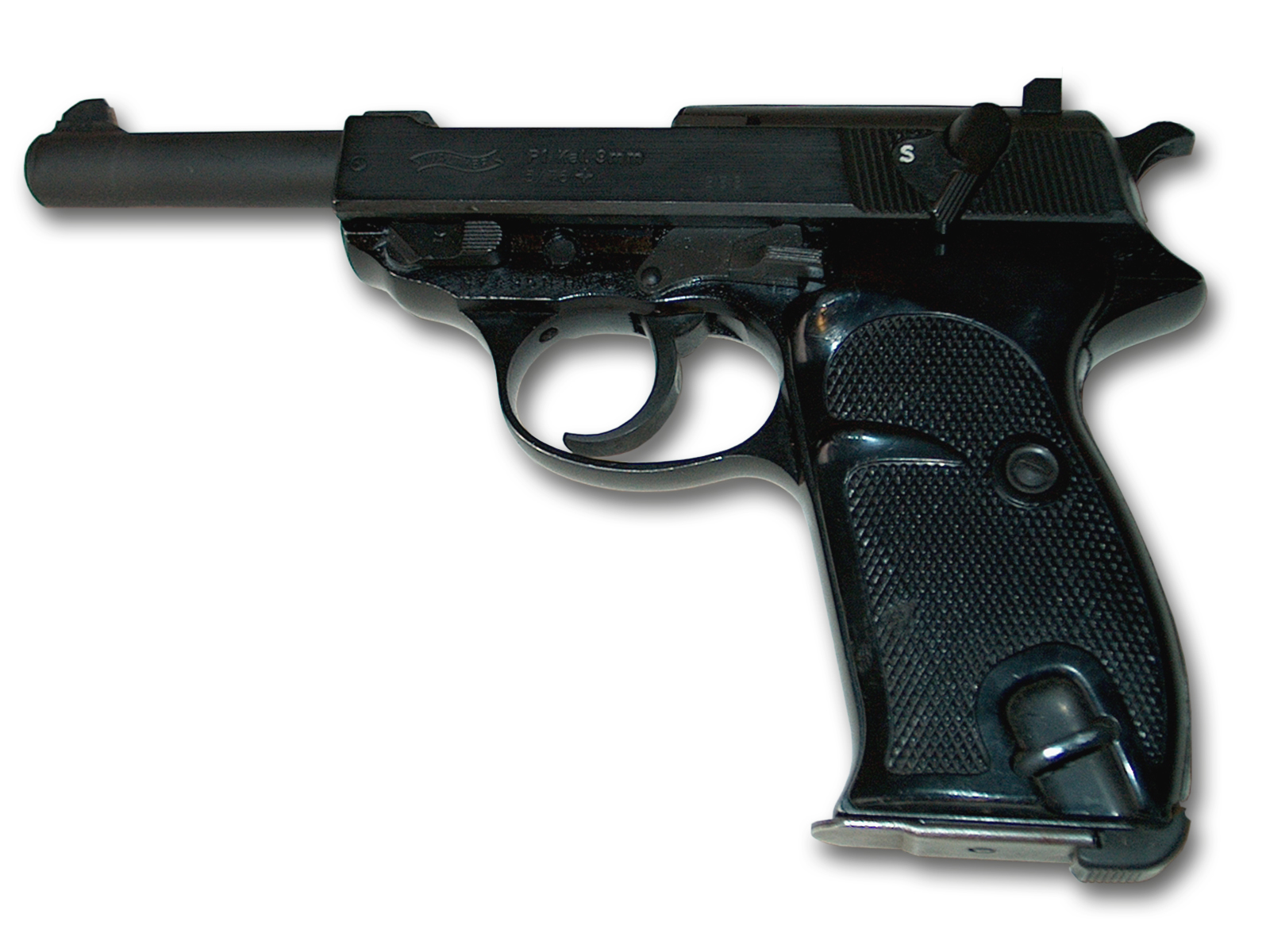
Walther P1.

- Browning Hi-Power: Standard service pistol of the Rhodesian Army.
- Colt.45 M1911A1
- Mamba: locally-produced semi-automatic pistol introduced late in the War; not very reliable.
- Star Model 1920, 1921, and 1922 pistols
- Star Model BM: used by the Rhodesian Light Infantry (RLI).
- Walther P1: Standard service pistol of the BSAP.
- Walther PPK: Captured.
- Tokarev TT-33: Captured.
- CZ 52: Captured.
- CZ 75: Captured.

=== Submachine guns ===
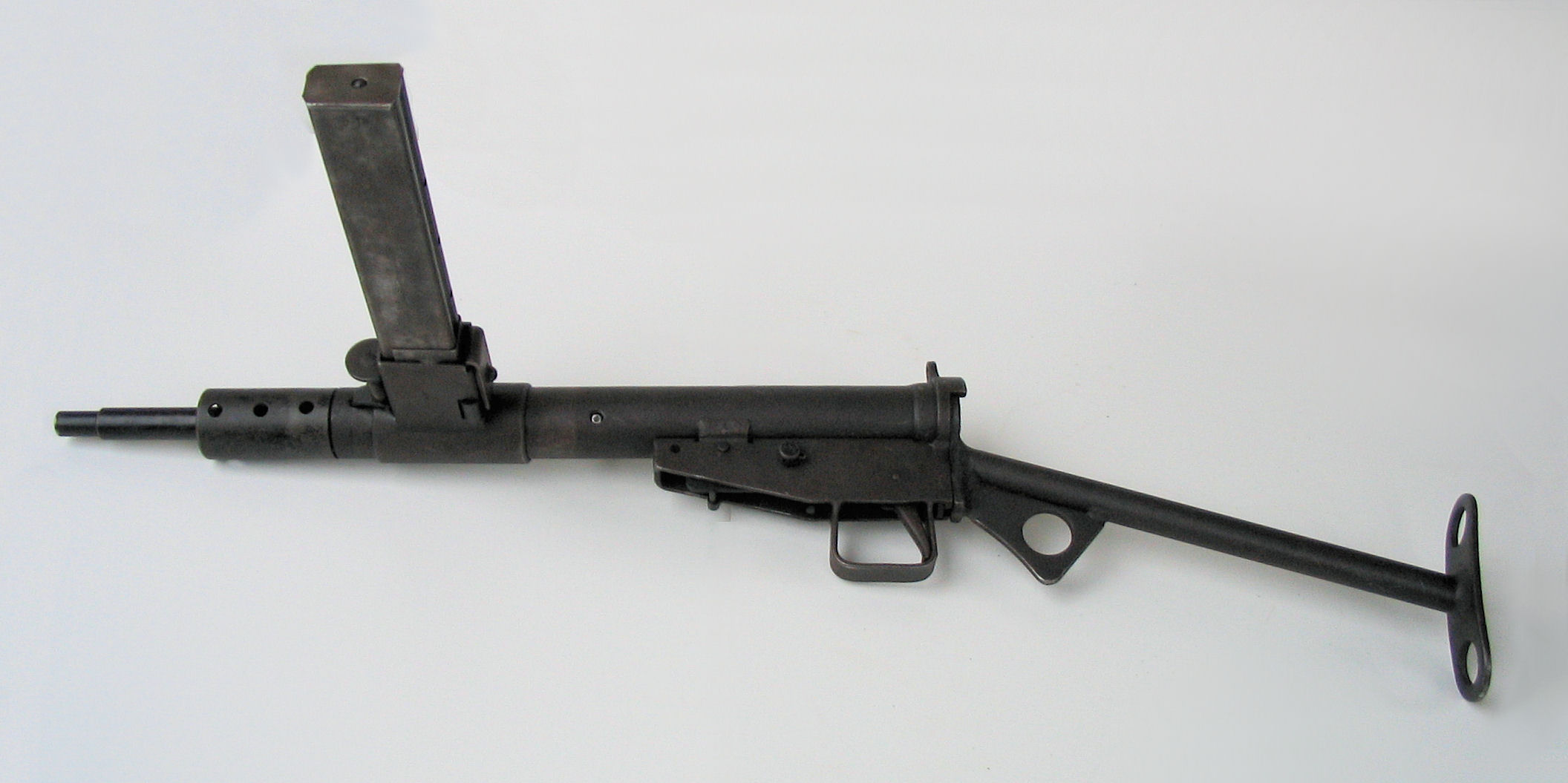
Sten Mk II.

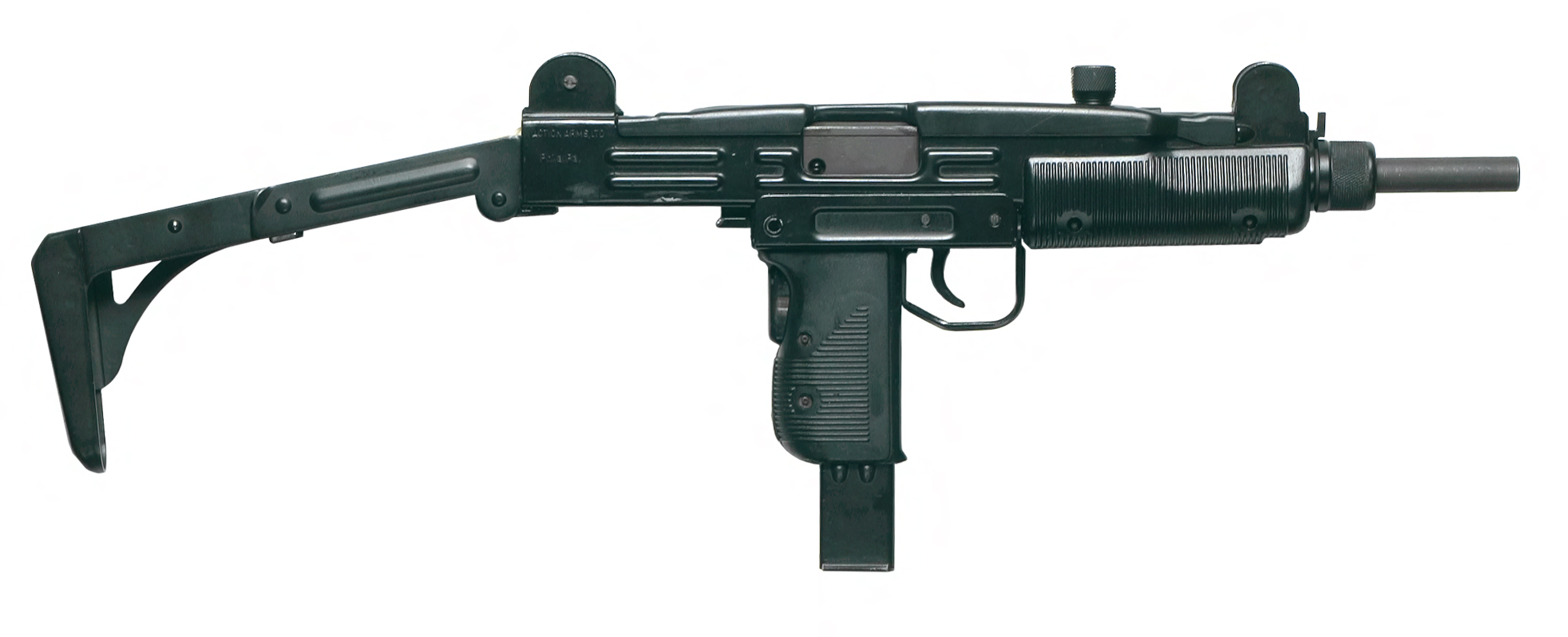
Uzi with a folding stock.

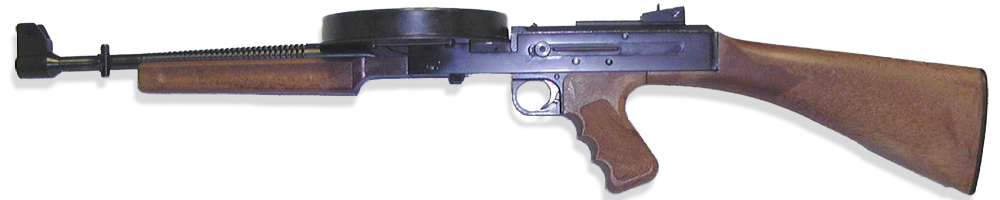
American-180.

- Sten Mk II: used early in the War.
- Austen "Machine Carbine" Mk I: used early in the War.
- Owen gun: used early in the War.
- Sterling submachine gun: Issued to the BSAP's Police Support Unit (PSU).
- Uzi: manufactured under license; issued to the BSAP's Urban Emergency Unit (SWAT) and Rhodesian Air Force helicopter crews.
- American-180: used by the Rhodesian SAS.
- Walther MPK
- Sa 25: Captured.
- GM15/GM16: locally-produced, slightly modified copy of the Czechoslovak Sa 25 in 9×19mm Parabellum; used by the INTAF and civilians late in the War. Manufacture was later transferred to South Africa where it was briefly marketed as the Sanna 77 in semi-automatic fire only.
- Cobra Mk1: locally-produced 9mm pistol-carbine; used by civilians late in the War.
- Scorpion: locally-produced 9mm light pistol-carbine derived from the Cobra Mk1; used by civilians late in the War.
- LDP/Kommando (nicknamed "Land Defence Pistol" and "Rhuzi"): locally-produced pistol-carbine; widely used by civilians late in the War. Later manufactured in South Africa as the Paramax.
- Northwood R-76/R-77: locally-produced submachine gun/carbine; used by civilians late in the War.

=== Bolt-action rifles ===
- Lee–Enfield SMLE Mk III: Issued only to reservists or second echelon troops; also used for training and ceremonial purposes.
- Lee–Enfield Rifle No. 4: Issued only to reservists or second echelon troops; also used for training and ceremonial purposes.
- Mauser Karabiner 98k: used late in the War; some were re-chambered to the 7.62mm NATO cartridge.

=== Semi-automatic rifles ===
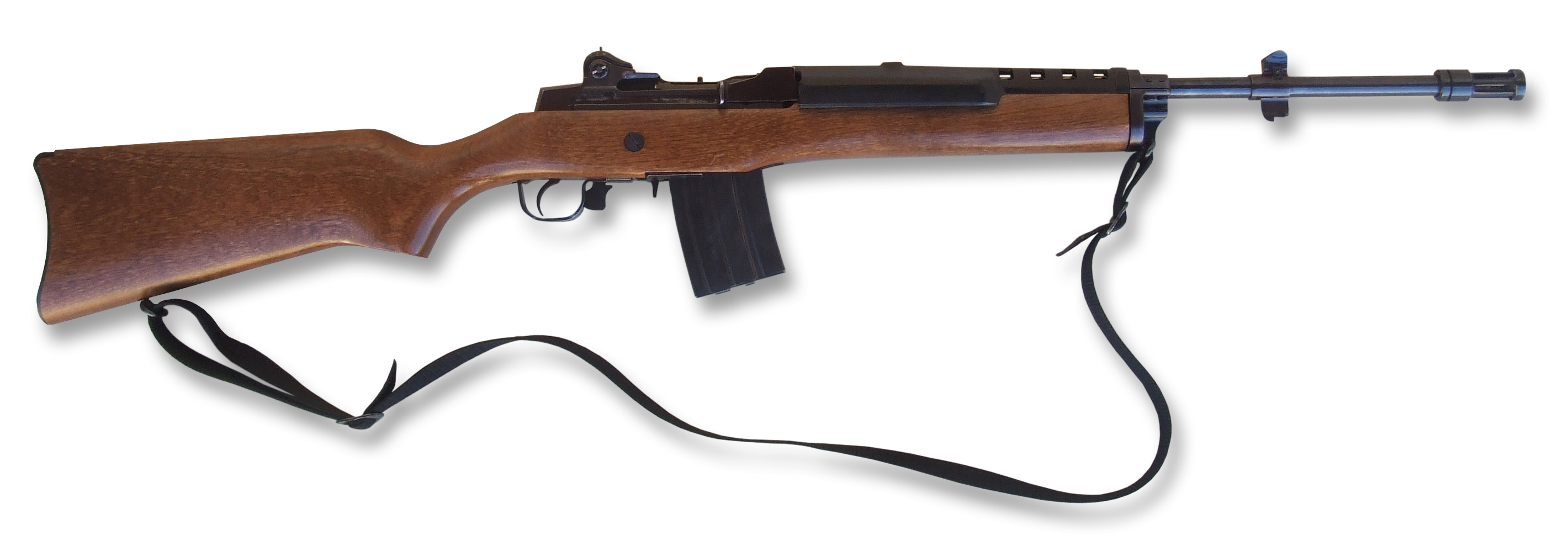
Ruger Mini-14.

- Ruger Mini-14
- SKS: Captured.

=== Battle rifles ===
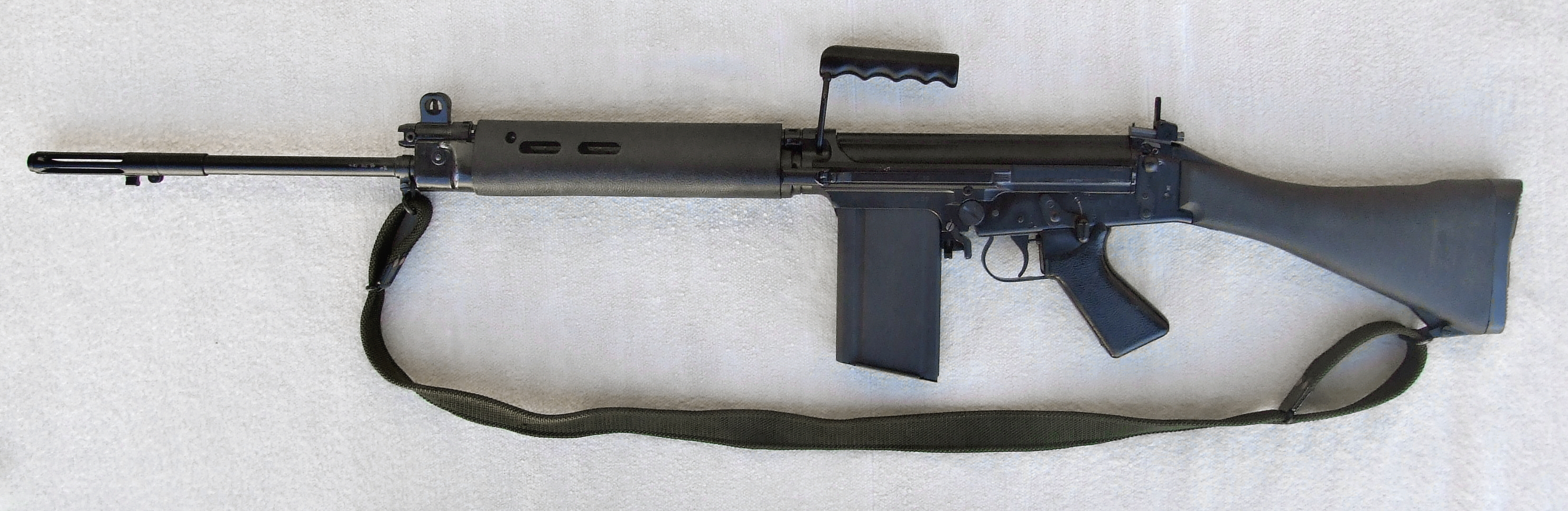
L1A1 Self-Loading Rifle.

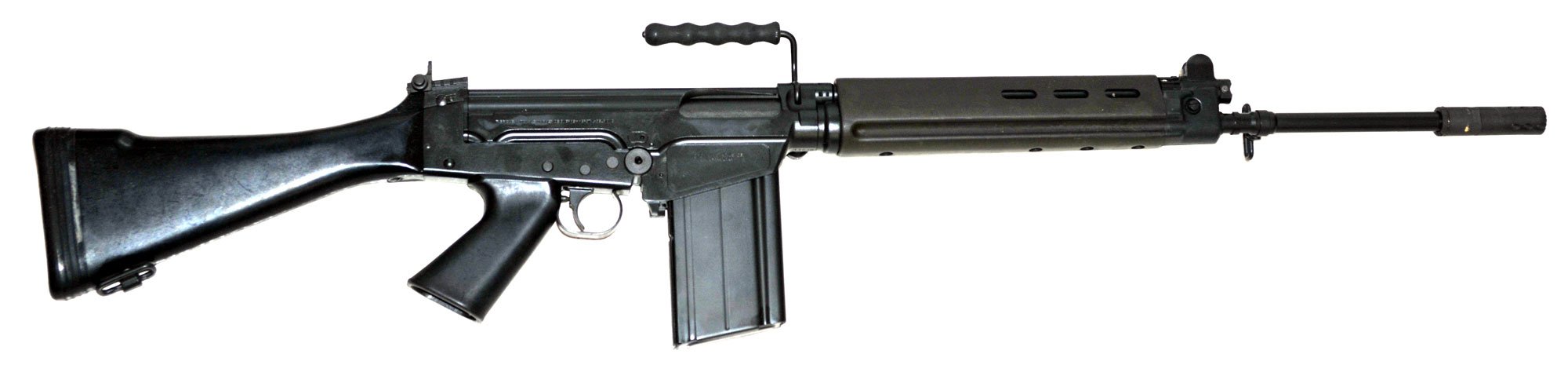
FN FAL assault rifle (50.00 model).

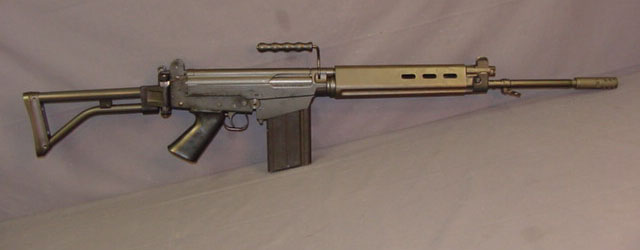
FN FAL 50.61 variant.

Heckler & Koch G3A3 rifle.

- L1A1 Self-Loading Rifle: Standard service rifle of the Rhodesian Army, adopted in the early 1960s; seconded to reserve status in 1966, being subsequently replaced by the FN FAL and G3 assault rifles.
- FN FAL: variants used comprised the Belgium-built standard FAL (50.00 model) and its folding stock version (50.61 model), the Brazilian IMBEL M964 and the South African Vektor R1, mostly provided by Portugal and South Africa; issued to all the branches of the Rhodesian Security Forces from 1966 to 1979.
- Heckler & Koch G3: licensed-produced m/961 and m/963 G3 versions of the HK G3A3 and G3A4 provided by Portugal; issued to all the branches of the Rhodesian Security Forces from 1966 to 1979.

=== Assault rifles ===
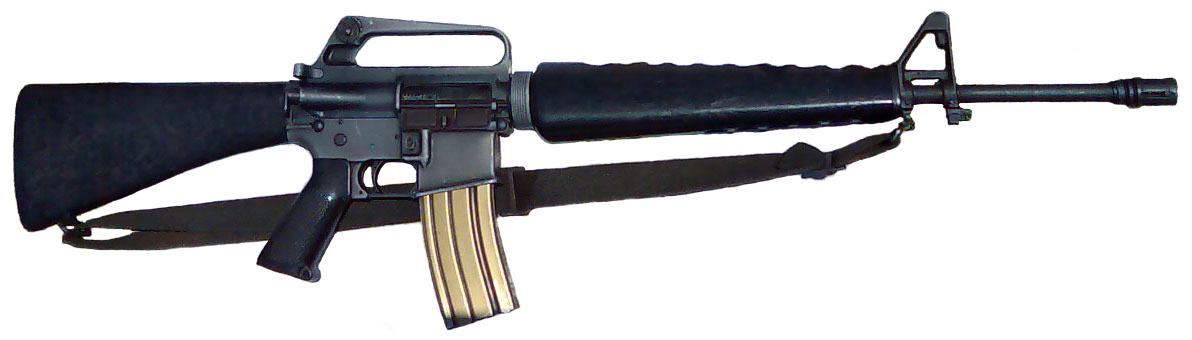
M16A1 assault rifle.

- M16A1: Received in limited numbers very late in the War; used by the Rhodesian SAS.
- AK-47 and AKS: Captured in large numbers; re-issued late in the War to the SFAs.
- AKM and AKMS: Captured in large numbers; re-issued primarily to helicopter crews.
- Type 56 and Type 56-1: Captured in large numbers; re-issued late in the War to the SFAs and helicopter crews.
- AMD-65: Captured.

=== Sniper rifles ===
- Lee–Enfield Rifle No. 4: some converted into sniper rifles.
- FN FAL: fitted with infrared night scopes, employed as a designated marksman rifle.
- Bruno 7.62×51mm: Czechoslovak-produced commercial rifle modified to military specifications for accuracy and durability.
- Dragunov SVD-63: Captured.

=== Shotguns ===
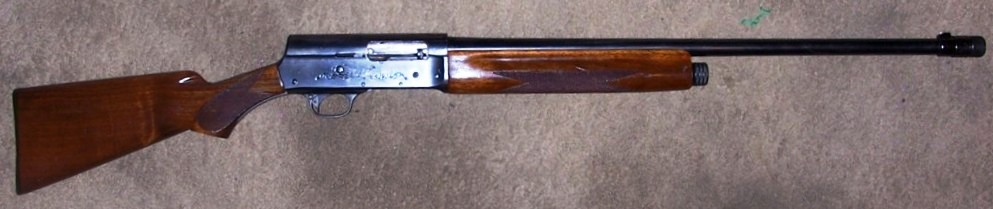
Browning Auto-5

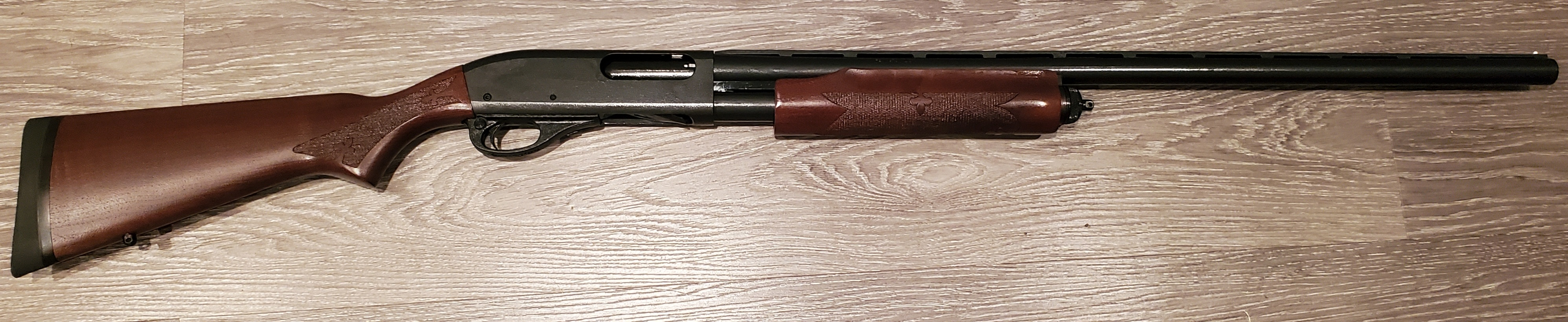
Remington Model 870

- Browning Auto-5: Issued to combat trackers, but was not very popular; often replaced in the field by the FN FAL battle rifle.
- Ithaca 37
- Remington Model 870
- Greener GP ("General Purpose") double-barrelled 12-gauge shotgun: issued only to Guard Force and Territorial units.

=== Light machine guns ===
- Bren Mark 3: used early in the War, later replaced by the FN MAG. Also found twin-mounted on Rhodesian SAS Sabre Land Rovers and armoured vehicles.
- Bren L4A4: used early in the War, later replaced by the FN MAG. Also found twin-mounted on Rhodesian SAS Sabre Land Rovers and armoured vehicles.
- FN FAL 50.41 Heavy Barrel (HB)
- Degtyaryov DP-27/DP-28: Captured.
- RPD: Captured; used by the Selous Scouts, Rhodesian SAS and Rhodesian Light Infantry (RLI) on "externals" and Fireforce missions.
- RPK: Captured; used by the Rhodesian SAS on "externals" and Fireforce missions.

=== General-purpose machine guns ===
- FN MAG: standard squad- and platoon-level weapon in infantry formations; also found pintle-mounted on Unimog 416 light trucks and twin-mounted on armoured vehicles.
- PK machine gun: Captured late in the War.

=== Medium and Heavy machine guns ===
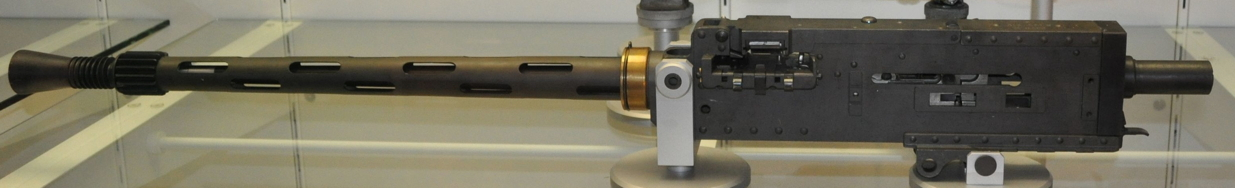
Browning .303 Mk 2 medium machine gun.

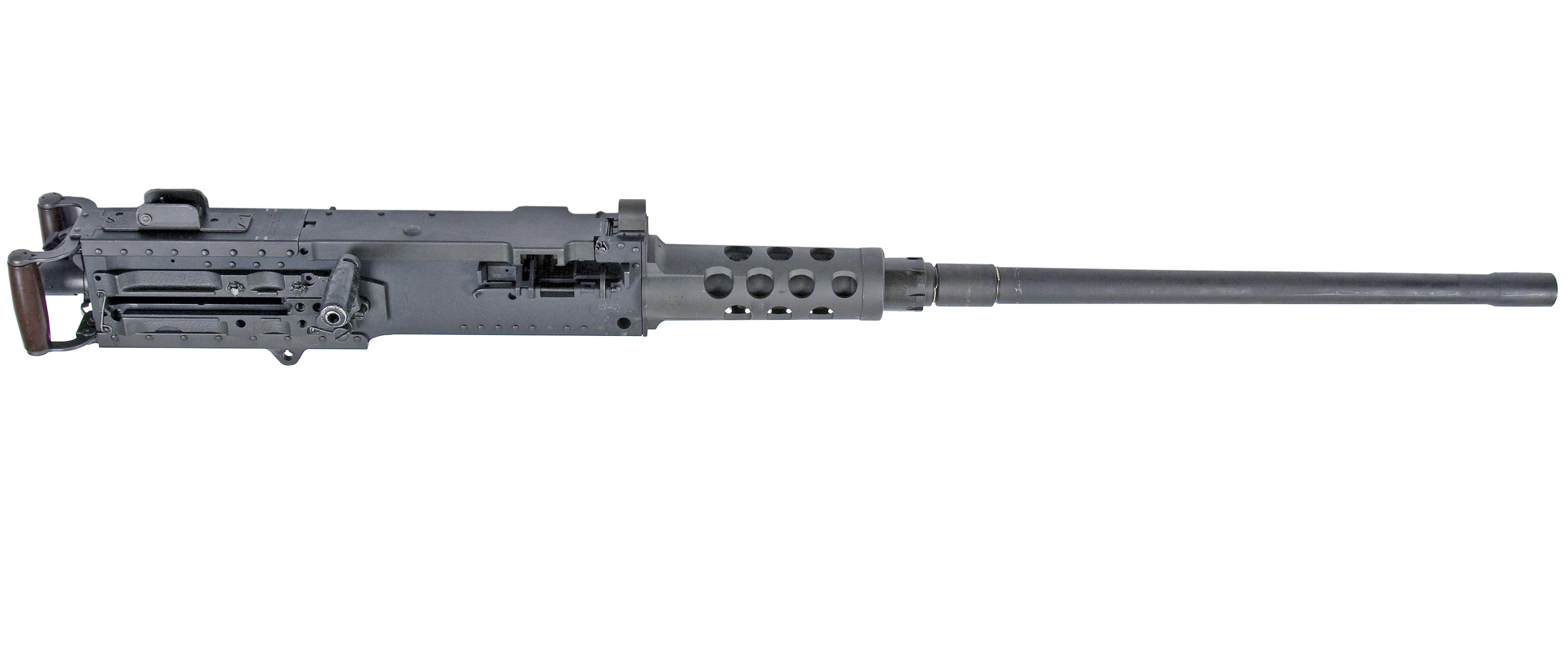
Browning M2HB .50 Cal heavy machine gun.

- Browning M1919A4 .30 Cal medium machine gun: standard platoon-level weapon in infantry formations; twin Browning Mk 2 models, re-chambered in the British .303 cartridge were mounted on Rhodesian Air Force Alouette III helicopter gunships (nicknamed "G-Cars" and "K-Cars"), as well as modified variants fitted with FN MAG bipods, pistol grips and stocks for ground use. Also found pintle-mounted on Land Rover, Mazda and Peugeot light pickups, Unimog 416 light trucks and armoured vehicles.
- Browning M2HB .50 Cal heavy machine gun: available in limited numbers; used on vehicles only, pintle-mounted on Unimog 416 light trucks and armoured vehicles.
- DShKM 12.7mm Heavy machine gun: Captured; pintle-mounted on Unimog 416 light trucks and armoured vehicles.
- KPV 14.5mm Heavy machine gun: Captured.

=== Grenade systems ===
- No. 36 (Mills) fragmentation-type hand grenade
- Mk 2 "Pineapple" fragmentation hand/rifle grenade
- Armscor M962 HE fragmentation-type hand grenade: South African copy of the American Mk 2 "Pineapple" grenade.
- Armscor M963 fragmentation-type hand grenade: South African copy of the US M26 grenade.
- No. 80 Mk 1 White Phosphorus Smoke Hand Grenade
- Armscor M970 White Phosphorus Smoke Hand Grenade
- PRB 424 anti-personnel rifle grenade
- Armscor 42 Zulu anti-personnel rifle grenade: South African-produced grenade derived from the Belgian PRB 424.
- Skorpion Rifle Grenade: locally-produced anti-personnel rifle grenade.
- STRIM 28R anti-tank rifle grenade
- STRIM 32Z anti-tank rifle grenade
- Mecar Energa anti-tank rifle grenade
- Denel R1M1 75mm anti-tank rifle grenade: South African improved variant of the Energa AT grenade.

=== Land mine systems ===
- Box Mine: locally-produced wood box anti-personnel blast mine based on the German World War II Schü-mine 42; used early in the War.
- Shrapnel Mine No.2: South African copy of the US M18A1 Claymore anti-personnel mine; used in small numbers.
- Mine Shrapnel HE Anti-Personnel Claymore: locally-produced anti-personnel blast mine based on the South African Shrapnel Mine No.2, but smaller in size; trip-wired as a static mine in the border minefields (CORSAN).
- No. 5 (Mark I) anti-personnel mine
- Mine Shrapnel HE Anti-Personnel Plough Disc (nicknamed "Ploughshare Mine"): locally-produced anti-personnel blast mine; trip-wired as a static mine in the border minefields (CORSAN).
- Mine Pressure HE Anti-Personnel Carrot or RAP No.1 (nicknamed "Carrot Mine"): locally-produced pressure mine, made of brown plastic tubing 7-8 inches long, with a pointed end at the bottom.
- RAP No.2 (nicknamed "Adams Grenade"): locally-produced fragmentation grenade/mine based closely on the Soviet POMZ-type stake mounted anti-personnel mine; trip-wired as a static Booby trap for protecting military camps and rural homesteads.
- Mine Pressure HE AP Non-detectable: locally-produced anti-personnel round convex pressure mine, moulded in Green plastic.
- "The Cutter": locally-produced anti-personnel blast mine, based on captured guerrilla's home-made Disc Mines. It was made of two plough discs lightly welded together, packed with all-weather Semtex and an inserted 4-second delay fuse; used by the BSAP's Special Branch.
- M/969 anti-personnel mine: Portuguese copy of the Belgian NR 409 plastic cased AP blast mine.
- Shrapnel No.2 R2M1/2: South African-produced anti-personnel blast mine.
- Mk 5 anti-tank mine
- Mine Pressure HE Anti-Vehicle: locally-produced round convex pressure mine, moulded in Drab Green plastic and fitted with an anti-lift device.
- TM-46 blast anti-tank mine: Captured.
- TMN-46 blast anti-tank mine: Captured.

=== Bombs and explosive devices ===
- "Golf" and "Mini Golf" General-purpose bombs: locally-produced 460 kg pressure bombs used by the Rhodesian Air Force on Fireforce missions.
- 20 lb Fragmentation Bomb Mk 1: locally-produced bomb used by the Rhodesian Air Force; not very reliable, retired in 1974.
- Mk 1/2 Fragmentation Bomb (nicknamed "Alpha"): locally-produced blast and shrapnel 450 lb (200 kg) Cluster-type bomb used by the Rhodesian Air Force.
- 17 gall and 50 gall "Frantans" (acronym for "frangible tanks"): locally-produced Napalm-filled drop tanks used by the Rhodesian Air Force on Fireforce missions.
- Bunker bomb: locally-produced explosive device, consisting of a length of plastic pipe or old grenade packing tubes filled with explosive and fitted with a grenade fuse at one end; used by the Rhodesian Light Infantry (RLI) during external "camp attack" operations to clear enemy bunkers.
- Tin bunker bomb: locally-produced explosive device, consisting of 1 kg of explosive packed into a cylindrical tin, used for taking the roof off bunkers and buildings; not very reliable.
- "The Hulk": locally-produced bunker bomb, consisting of a 5 kg explosive charge with a 20 second fuse designed to blow holes in the walls of buildings under attack; not very reliable.
- Charge Demolition Special No 1: locally-produced demolition charge.
- Charge Demolition Special No 3 (Hayrick): locally-produced demolition charge.
- Shape-charge Beehive: locally-produced demolition charge.
- Firing Mechanism Demolition 4 (Pull): locally-produced demolition charge.
- Pipe bomb: locally-produced shotgun-like explosive device, made of steel piping of 100mm with one end plugged, packed with explosives and shrapnel; used by the BSAP's Special Branch in targeted assassinations within Rhodesia.
- Car bomb: Semtex-rigged civilian cars were used by the Selous Scouts and the BSAP's Special Branch to assassinate enemy VIPs in Zambia.
- Suitcase bomb: four captured (and modified) Soviet-made suitcase bombs were used by the Selous Scouts to attack ZIPRA's HQ in Francistown, Botswana.
- Radio bomb: portable commercial transistor radio receiver or record player fitted by the Selous Scouts with explosives and a switch that detonated after three or so on/offs; they could also be remotely triggered by transmitters carried in Rhodesian Air Force's "Trojan" Signals intelligence (SIGINT) aircraft flying overhead.

=== Rocket systems ===
- SNEB 68mm rocket projectile: used by the Rhodesian Air Force on Fireforce missions and on "externals" in Zambia and Mozambique.
- Modified SNEB 37mm HE rocket: used by the Rhodesian Air Force on Fireforce missions and on "externals" in Zambia and Mozambique.
- Mini-"Stalin Organ" (nicknamed "SNEB"): one locally-built, six-tube Multiple rocket launcher which shot home-made 37mm armour-piercing rockets was mounted on a Unimog 416 light truck used by the Selous Scouts on "externals" in Mozambique.
- DKB Grad-P 122mm Light portable rocket system: Captured very late in the War.
- SA-7b Grail surface-to-air missile: Captured very late in the War.

=== Anti-tank rockets and Grenade launchers ===
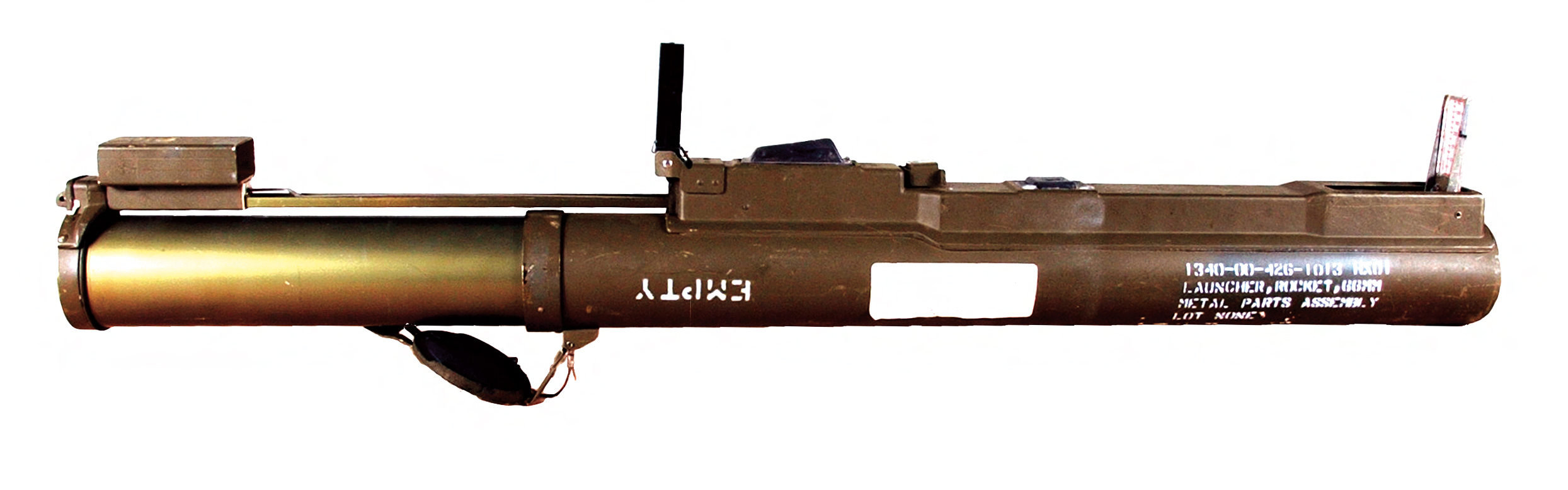
M72 LAW

- Rocket 37mm Target Indicator: not an offensive weapon; locally-produced, shoulder-fired launcher which shot modified Icarus para-flares out to 1 Km. Used by the Selous Scouts to mark the position of guerrillas sighted from Operations (Ops) for Rhodesian Air Force or Fireforce strikes.
- US M20 "Super Bazooka" 3.5 inch: seldom taken to the field, replaced in 1978 by captured RPG-7s.
- M72 LAW: used very late in the War.
- MILAN: used very late in the War.
- RPG-2 rocket-propelled grenade launcher: Captured.
- RPG-7 rocket-propelled grenade launcher: Captured.

=== Recoilless rifles ===
- US M40A1 105 mm: mounted on Unimog 416 light trucks (nicknamed "106 carriers").
- B-10 82 mm: Captured late in the War; re-mounted on Willys CJ-3B jeeps and used by the Selous Scouts on "externals" in Mozambique.
- B-11 107 mm: Captured late in the War.

=== Mortars ===
- Kew Engineering 60mm Commando Mortar: locally-produced hand-held lightweight mortar.
- ADF 2-inch mortar: locally-produced lightweight mortar; manufactured in small numbers late in the War for the INTAF.
- Denel M4 Patmor 60mm hand-held lightweight Commando Mortar (nicknamed "patrol mortar"): provided by South Africa.
- L16 81mm mortar
- L1A1 81 mm mortar: Version of the French-produced Hotchkiss-Brandt TDA MO-81-61-L "light long" mortar.

=== Howitzers ===
- Ordnance QF Mk III 25-pounder Field gun/Howitzer (nicknamed "88mm gun/howitzer"): 16 to 24 guns in service with the 1st Field Regiment, Rhodesian Artillery.
- BL 5.5-inch medium gun (nicknamed "140mm gun"): eight guns loaned by the South African Defence Force (SADF) in service with the 1st Field Regiment, Rhodesian Artillery.
- M101A1 105 mm Howitzer: unknown number of guns in service with the 1st Field Regiment, Rhodesian Artillery.
- OTO Melara Mod 56 105 mm Pack Howitzer: nine guns in service with the 1st Field Regiment, Rhodesian Artillery.

=== Anti-aircraft guns and Autocannons ===
- 37 mm gun M1 anti-aircraft autocannon
- Matra MG 151/20 20mm autocannon: fitted to Alouette III helicopter gunships ("K-Cars").
- British Hispano Mk.V 20 mm autocannon: taken from decommissioned Rhodesian Air Force De Havilland Vampire FB Mk9 single-seater fighter jets and re-mounted on two UR-416 Armoured cars and on the two "Hot Lips" armoured cars deployed by the Selous Scouts and the Rhodesian SAS on "externals" in Mozambique. Also used on ground mounts by the Rhodesian SAS and the Selous Scouts.
- ZPU-1 14.5mm AA autocannon: Captured during "externals" in Mozambique; some mounted on Unimog 416 light trucks.
- ZU-23-2 twin-barrelled AA autocannon: 12 guns captured during "externals" in Mozambique.
- Zastava M55 A2 20mm triple-barrelled automatic anti-aircraft gun: Captured during "externals" in Mozambique.
- ZPU-4 14.5mm Quadruple-barrelled AA autocannon: Captured during "externals" in Mozambique.

=== Armoured and mine-protected vehicles ===
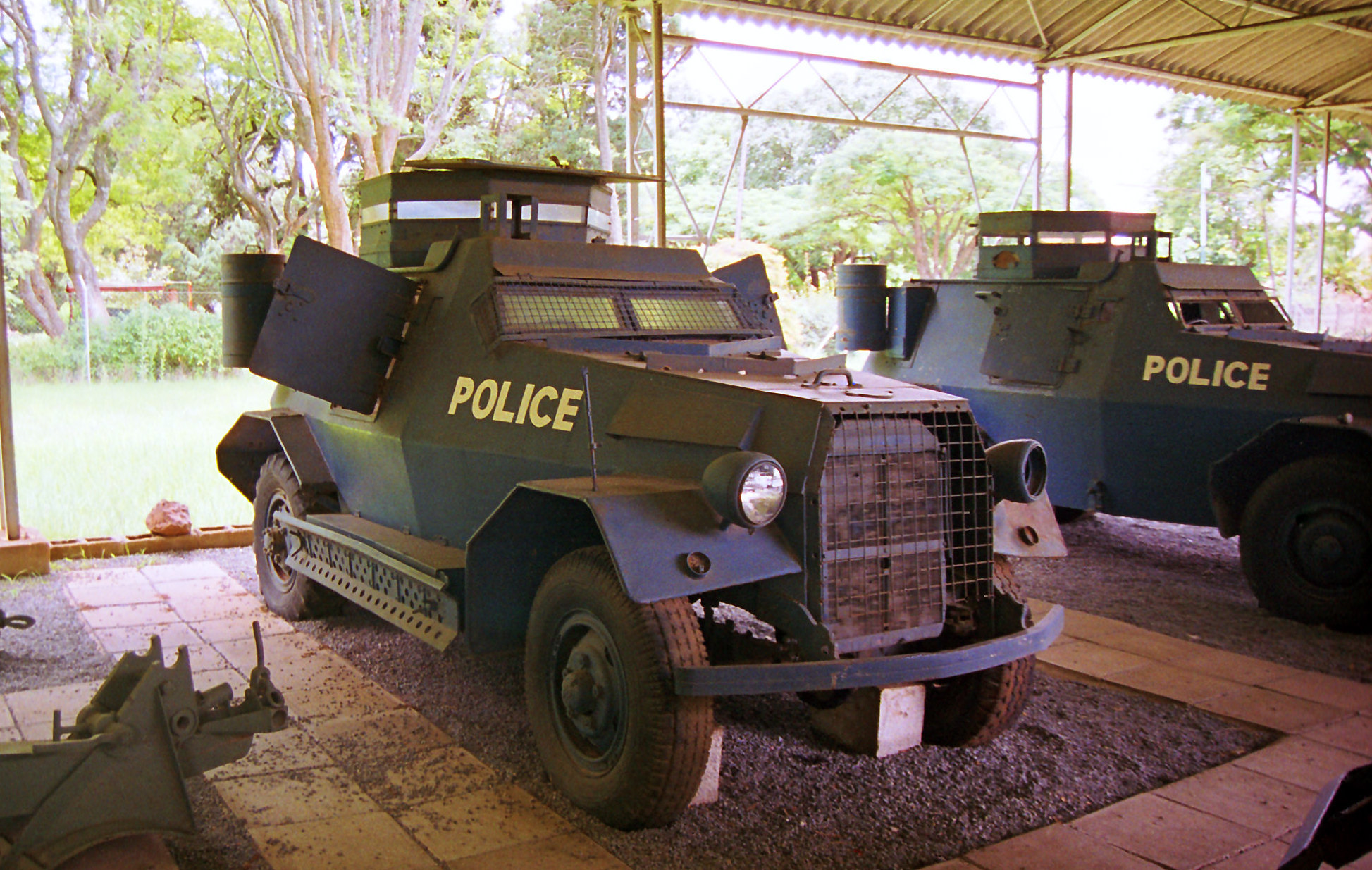
BSAP Marmon-Herrington MkIII armoured cars in the Zimbabwe Military Museum, Gweru.

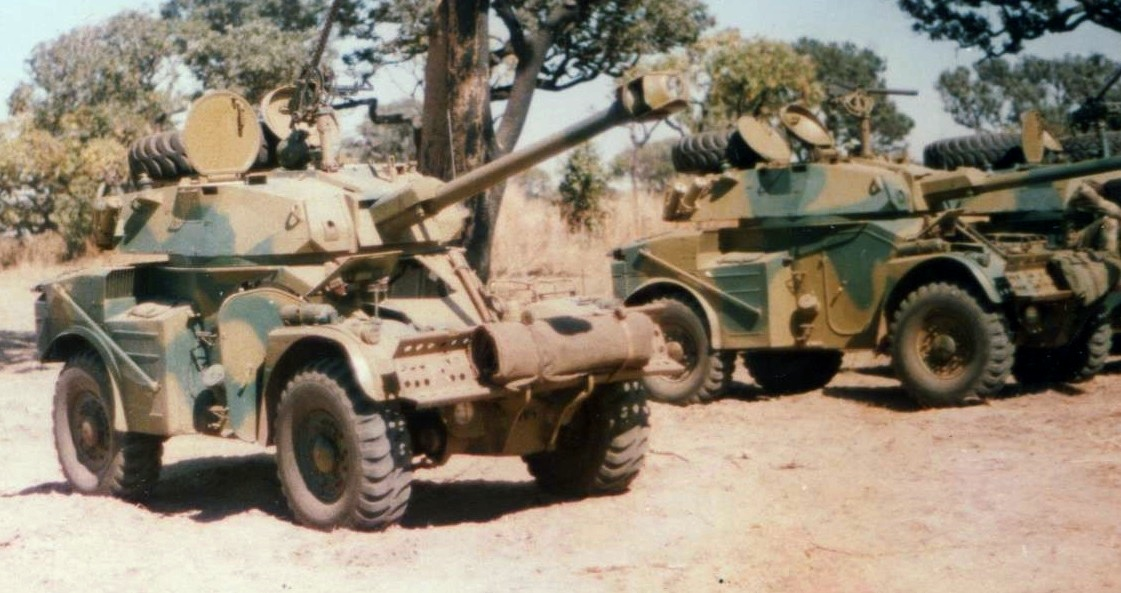
Eland-90 Mk 6 armoured cars of the Rhodesian Armoured Corps parked at the Inkomo weapons range, 1979.

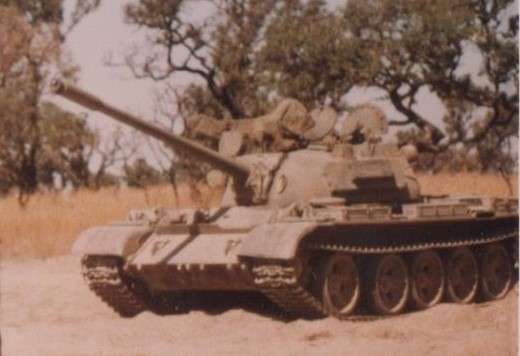
Rhodesian T-55LD tank of the Rhodesian Armoured Corps parked at the Inkomo weapons range, 1979.

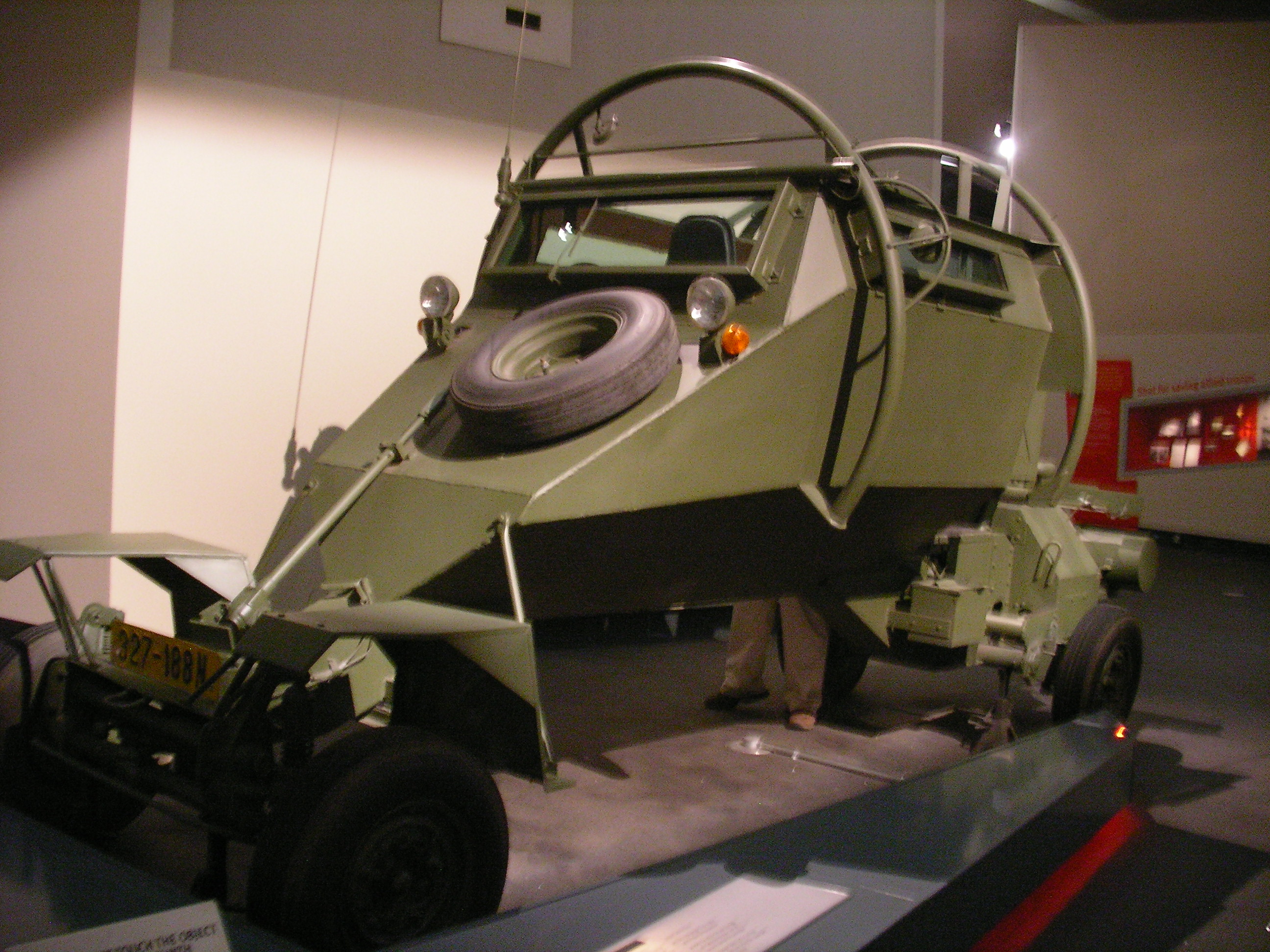
A Leopard APC, mine-protected vehicle, designed and built in Rhodesia during the late 1970s and based on a Volkswagen Kombi engine. This example is displayed in the Imperial War Museum North, Manchester, UK.

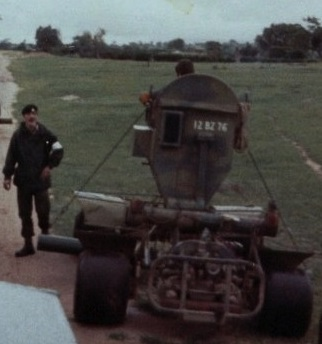
A Rhodesian Pookie mine detecting vehicle deployed in 1979.

- T-34/85 medium tank: some captured during "externals" in Mozambique.
- T-55LD Main battle tank (MBT): eight tanks provided late in the War by South Africa; never deployed operationally.
- BRDM-2 reconnaissance armoured car: Captured during "externals" in Mozambique.
- Staghound Mk I armoured car: 20 in service, used early in the War by the Support Commando Rhodesian Light Infantry (RLI); retired in 1969.
- Marmon-Herrington Mk III armoured car: four in service, used early in the War by the BSAP's Police Reserve Recce unit; retired in 1972.
- Shorland armoured car: unlicensed variant; two were built and deployed by the Selous Scouts on an attempted external operation to abduct a group of ZIPRA leaders' at a meeting held in Francistown, Botswana in 1979.
- Ferret Mk 2 Scout Car (nicknamed "George"): 20 in service, used on road convoy escort duties; occasionally deployed on "externals" in Mozambique.
- Eland-90 Mk 5/Mk 6 armoured car: South African-produced versions of the French Panhard AML-90; 60 loaned by South Africa and deployed on "externals" in Mozambique.
- Eland-60 Mk 4 armoured car: South African-produced version of the French Panhard AML-HE60-7; 10 loaned by South Africa and used by the Rhodesian Air Force Regiment for Forward Air Field (FAF) defence and aviation fuel convoy escort duties.
- Carrier, Universal, T16, Mark I: one modified vehicle, fitted locally with a tall armoured superstructure featuring one twin-FN MAG and one twin-Bren mountings and radio equipment, was used by the Rhodesian Air Force Regiment for airfield defence and convoy escort on rough terrain.
- Mine Protected Land Rover (MPLR): locally-built, mine-protected version of the Land Rover Series III LWB.
- Armadillo: locally-built ambush-protected version of the MPLR.
- Leopard security vehicle: locally-built monocoque mine-protected vehicle used by the BSAP.
- Hippo APC: mine-protected vehicle provided early in the war by South Africa; used by the Rhodesian Army and the BSAP.
- Moon Hyena APC: mine-protected vehicle provided early in the war by South Africa; 146 in service with the BSAP, refurbished later in the War and reallocated as command vehicles to the Police Support Unit (PSU).
- Rhino/Moon Buggy APC: locally-built mine-protected vehicle used by the Rhodesian Army, the BSAP and departmental units.
- Tusker Tourer APC: locally-built mine-protected civilian version of the Rhino/Moon Buggy.
- Cougar APC: locally-built mine-protected vehicle used by the Rhodesian Army, the Rhodesian Air Force Regiment and the INTAF.
- Kudu APC: locally-built mine-protected vehicle used by the BSAP on road convoy escort duties.
- Puma APC: locally-built mine-protected troop-carrying vehicle used by the Rhodesian Army and the BSAP; deployed on Fireforce missions and also used by the Rhodesian Light Infantry (RLI) on "externals" in Mozambique.
- Anti-Ambush Mine Protected Vehicle (AAMPV): locally-built mine-protected, medium-sized troop-carrying vehicle; used by Civil Defence-run area defence militias.
- Batmobile TCV: locally-built mine-protected heavy troop-carrying vehicle; used by a private mining company and by Civil Defence-run area defence militias.
- Bullet TCV: locally-built mine-protected troop-carrying vehicle; prototype only, used as a training vehicle very late in the war by the Rhodesian Armoured Corps.
- Buffel APC: mine-protected troop-carrying vehicle provided very late in the war by South Africa.
- UR-416 Armoured car: two vehicles deployed by the Selous Scouts on "externals" in Mozambique; nicknamed "Pigs" by the Rhodesians, they were actually unlicensed (and modified) copies of the original West German design.
- "Hot Lips": two locally-built armoured cars, based on a heavily modified design of the UR-416, were deployed by the Rhodesian SAS on "externals" in Mozambique.
- Crocodile armoured personnel carrier: locally-built mine-protected troop-carrying vehicle used on road convoy escort duties by the BSAP and the SFAs; also deployed on Fireforce missions and "externals" in Zambia and Mozambique.
- MAP45 armoured personnel carrier: locally-built mine-protected troop-carrying vehicle used on Fireforce missions; also deployed on "externals" in Zambia and Mozambique.
- MAP75 armoured personnel carrier: locally-built mine-protected troop-carrying vehicle used on Fireforce missions; also deployed on "externals" in Zambia and Mozambique.
- BTR-152 Armoured Personnel Carrier: some captured during "externals" in Mozambique.
- Mine Protected Combat Vehicle (MPCV, nicknamed the "Spook"): locally-built mine-protected troop-carrying vehicle based on a heavily modified Unimog 416 light truck chassis introduced very late in the war; never deployed operationally.
- Pookie mine detecting vehicle: locally-built light mine-protected vehicle used to detect anti-tank mines laid by guerrillas on Rhodesian roads.
- Mine Protected Mortar Carrier (MPMC, nicknamed the "Scorpion"): locally-built light mine-protected vehicle based on a Unimog 416 light truck chassis modified to accept a base mount for either an L16 81mm mortar or a L1A1 81 mm mortar; deployed on "externals" in Zambia and Mozambique.
- MAP 6×6 Artillery Tractor (nicknamed "5.5 Gun Tractor"): locally-built mine-protected artillery tractor based on a Mercedes-Benz L2624 6×6 medium-duty truck chassis, used to tow BL 5.5-inch medium guns; eight in service with the 1st Field Regiment, Rhodesian Artillery.

=== Escort, transport and recovery vehicles ===
- Mini Moke lightweight military vehicle: used early in the War by the BSAP for patrol duties in rural areas.
- Willys CJ-3B jeep: some converted into technicals by the Selous Scouts and deployed on "externals" in Mozambique.
- Willys M38A1 MD jeep: some converted into technicals by the Selous Scouts and deployed on "externals" in Mozambique.
- Land-Rover short (SWB) and long wheelbase series (LWB) II-III light pickup
- Sabre Land Rover: specially-modified 109in LWB Series II Land Rover version fitted with co-axially mounted Bren guns on the front (later replaced by FN MAGs), a single anti-aircraft Bren at the rear, a spotlight, radio and three smoke dischargers. Four vehicles were deployed in April 1979 by the Rhodesian SAS during Operation Bastille, an unsuccessful external operation to assassinate ZIPRA's Commander-in-chief Joshua Nkomo, with an attack on his residence at Lusaka, Zambia.
- Toyota Land Cruiser (J42/J43) light pickup
- Nissan Patrol G60 (LWB) pickup
- 25cwt J-series Jeep Gladiator pickup truck: bought from the South African Defence Force (SADF); used by the Rhodesian Army and the BSAP.
- Peugeot 404 light pickup: used by the BSAP for road patrol and convoy escort duties, fitted with a pintle-mounted Browning .303 Mk 2 medium machine gun.
- Mazda B1600 Pickup truck: used by the BSAP for road convoy escort duties, fitted with either a Browning .303 Mk 2 medium machine gun or a FN MAG mounted on an open-topped, cylinder-shaped turret (nicknamed "the dustbin").
- Ford F-250 ¾ ton pickup truck
- Unimog 416 light truck (nicknamed "Rodef 25"-"Two Five"): some converted into technicals deployed by the Rhodesian Armoured Corps, Rhodesian SAS, Rhodesian Light Infantry (RLI) and Selous Scouts on "externals" in Zambia and Mozambique.
- Unimog 404.0 ambulance version
- Bedford RL Petrol lorry (nicknamed "Big Daddy"): used early in the War by the Rhodesian Army and the BSAP.
- Bedford MK Diesel lorry: used early in the War by the Rhodesian Army and the BSAP.
- Mercedes-Benz 4.5 ton L1517 medium-duty truck (nicknamed "Rodef 45"-"Four Five")
- Mercedes-Benz 4.5 ton LA911B medium-duty truck (nicknamed "Rodef 45"-"Four Five")
- Mercedes-Benz 7.5 ton LA1113/42 medium-duty truck (nicknamed "Rodef 75"-"Seven Five")
- Mercedes-Benz L2624 6×6 medium-duty truck
- Transporte Geral 2,5 ton. Berliet/Tramagal GBA MT D 6×6 m/1968: one ex-Portuguese Army medium-duty truck captured during "externals" in Mozambique and converted into a Gun truck fitted with pintle-mounted 20mm autocannons by the Selous Scouts, who nicknamed it "Brutus".
- Nissan Diesel UG780 5-tonne truck: used by the Rhodesian Army and the BSAP.
- Isuzu TX series 5-tonne truck: used by the Rhodesian Army and the BSAP.
- Toyota DA110/DA115 5-tonne heavy-duty trucks
- Nissan CK10 heavy-duty truck: used by the Rhodesian Army and the INTAF.
- MAP75 command vehicle: command version equipped with radios and map boards.
- MAP75 ambulance: modified version of the command vehicle intended for medical support and casualty evacuation.
- MAP75 cargo vehicle: transport version with shortened, open-top cargo hull.
- MAP75 articulated tractor: heavy transport truck with a four-wheel cargo trailer.
- MAP75 horse-carrying vehicle (HCV): modified transport version with wooden box for horses (nicknamed "horse box"), in service with the Grey's Scouts.
- MAP75 armoured horse-carrying vehicle: one specially-modified articulated tractor in service with the Grey's Scouts, later converted to a mobile operations and command room for "externals" (1978–79).
- MAP75 wrecker: recovery version with shortened cab mounting a 6-tonne Model 600 Holmes jib, with A-frame and tooling.
- Magirus-Deutz 4×4 wrecker: recovery version fitted with a mine and ambush protected (MAP) cab and mounting a 7.5-tonne Holmes 750 jib, with A-frame and tooling.
- Magirus-Deutz 290 hp 6×4 wrecker: recovery version fitted with a mine and ambush protected (MAP) cab and mounting a 7.5-tonne Holmes 750 jib, with A-frame and tooling.
- Mercedes-Benz L1517 wrecker: recovery version mounting a 7.5-tonne Holmes 750 jib, with A-frame and tooling.
- Mercedes-Benz L2624 6×6 (LWB) wrecker: recovery version fitted with a mine and ambush protected (MAP) cab and mounting a 7.5-tonne Holmes 750 jib, with A-frame and tooling.
- Mercedes-Benz L1517 medium-duty truck: converted to a horse-carrying vehicle (HCV) by adding a locally-built Dahmer cab for horses; in service with the Grey's Scouts.
- DAF F218 series medium-duty truck: converted to a horse-carrying vehicle (HCV) by adding a locally-built Dahmer cab for horses; in service with the Grey's Scouts.
- Albatross Mechanical Horse: locally-built articulated tractor based on a 290 hp Leyland 6×4 Semi-trailer fitted with a mine and ambush protected (MAP) cab (nicknamed "Muppet"); six in service very late in the War as armoured vehicle transporters with the Rhodesian Armoured Corps for its Eland-90 armoured cars.
- Magirus-Deutz Semi-trailer: imported from South Africa; used very late in the War as a Tank transporter by the Rhodesian Armoured Corps for its T-55LD tanks.
- Mercedes-Benz Semi-trailer: imported from South Africa; used very late in the War as a Tank transporter by the Rhodesian Armoured Corps for its T-55LD tanks.
- Yamaha DT400B 175, 250 and 500cc off-road motorcycles: used by Rhodesian Army combat tracker units late in the War.

=== Rail vehicles ===
- Rhino rail-mounted MAP vehicle: adapted to run on rails by the Rhodesian Railways; employed in reconnaissance for ambushes and spotting (or safely detonating) any anti-tank mines that were laid on the rail tracks, travelling ahead of civilian trains.
- Tusker rail-mounted MAP vehicle: adapted to run on rails by the Rhodesian Railways; employed in reconnaissance for ambushes and spotting (or safely detonating) any anti-tank mines that were laid on the rail tracks, travelling ahead of civilian trains.
- Kudu rail-mounted MAP vehicle: adapted to run on rails by the Rhodesian Railways; employed in reconnaissance for ambushes and spotting (or safely detonating) any anti-tank mines that were laid on the rail tracks, travelling ahead of civilian trains.
- Cougar rail-mounted MAP vehicle: adapted to run on rails by the Rhodesian Railways; employed in reconnaissance for ambushes and spotting (or safely detonating) any anti-tank mines that were laid on the rail tracks, travelling ahead of civilian trains.

=== Helicopters ===
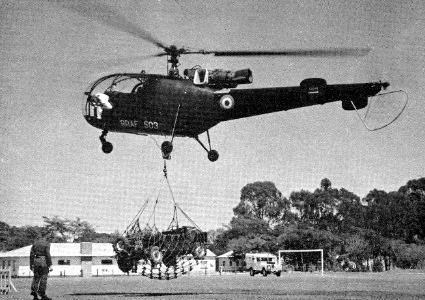
A Rhodesian Air Force SE 3160 Alouette III helicopter lifting a short wheelbase Mini Moke, August 1962. The Rhodesian Light Infantry (RLI) later used these helicopters for its Fireforce operations.

- Aérospatiale SE-3130 Alouette II light helicopter: six on loan from the South African Air Force (SAAF); employed early in the War on paramilitary and aerial reconnaissance operations, aerial supply, casualty evacuation, communications relays, and troop-transport by the Rhodesian Army, Rhodesian Air Force and the BSAP.
- Aérospatiale SE-3160 Alouette III light helicopter (nicknamed "Banda" by the guerrillas): 43 in service with the Rhodesian Air Force, including 27 on loan from the South African Air Force (SAAF) and an undisclosed number provided by France, plus additional two "liberated" from Mozambique; deployed in the utility and gunship ("G-Car" and "K-Car") roles on Fireforce missions and "externals" in Zambia, Botswana and Mozambique.
- Agusta-Bell 205A Utility helicopter (nicknamed "Cheetah"): 12 dilapidated helicopters provided by Israel via Oman; deployed very late in the War in the utility and gunship roles on Fireforce missions and "externals" in Zambia and Mozambique.

=== Aircraft ===
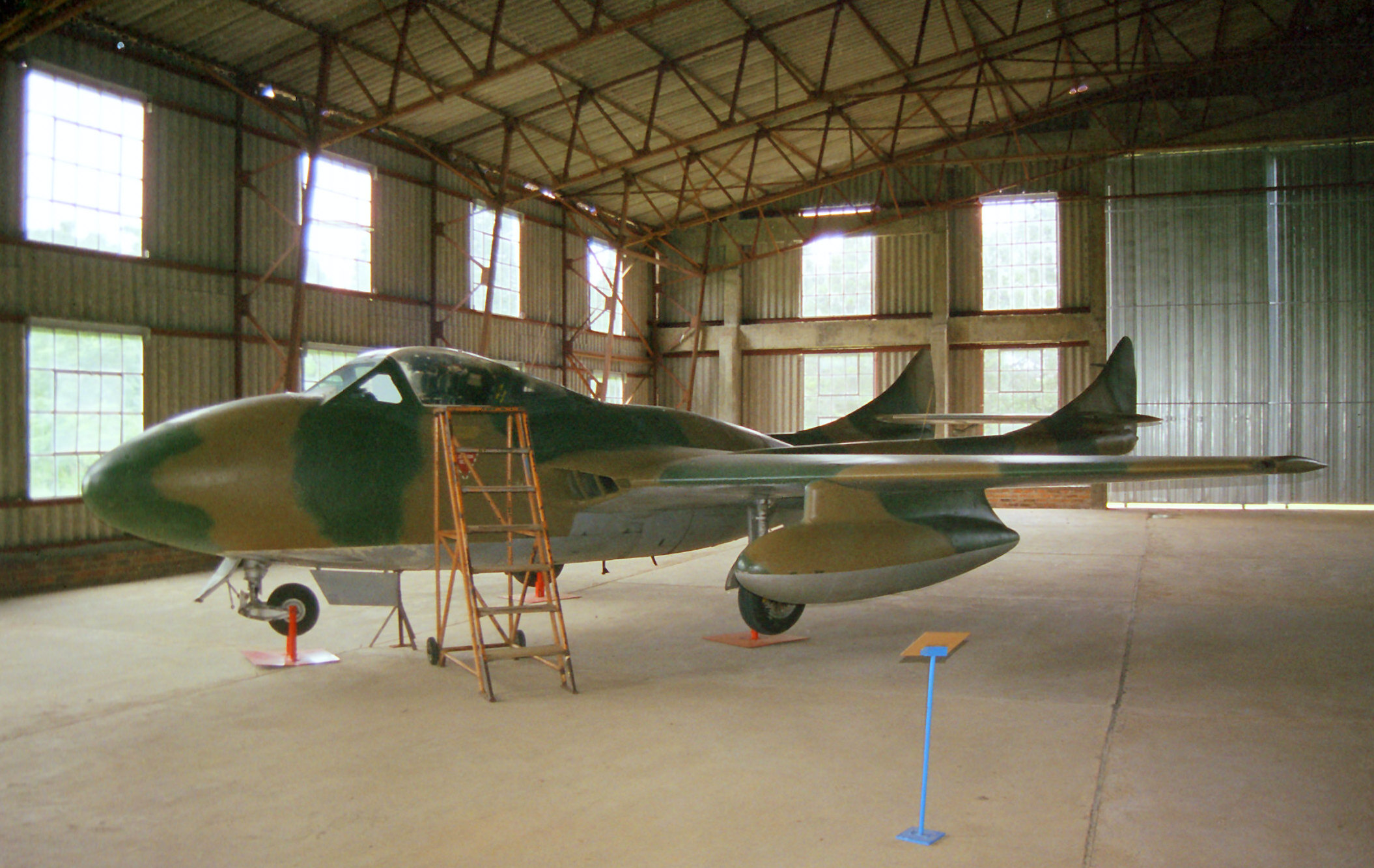
ex-Rhodesian Air Force De Havilland Vampire T.11 (DH.115) fighter jet at the Zimbabwe Military Museum, Gweru.

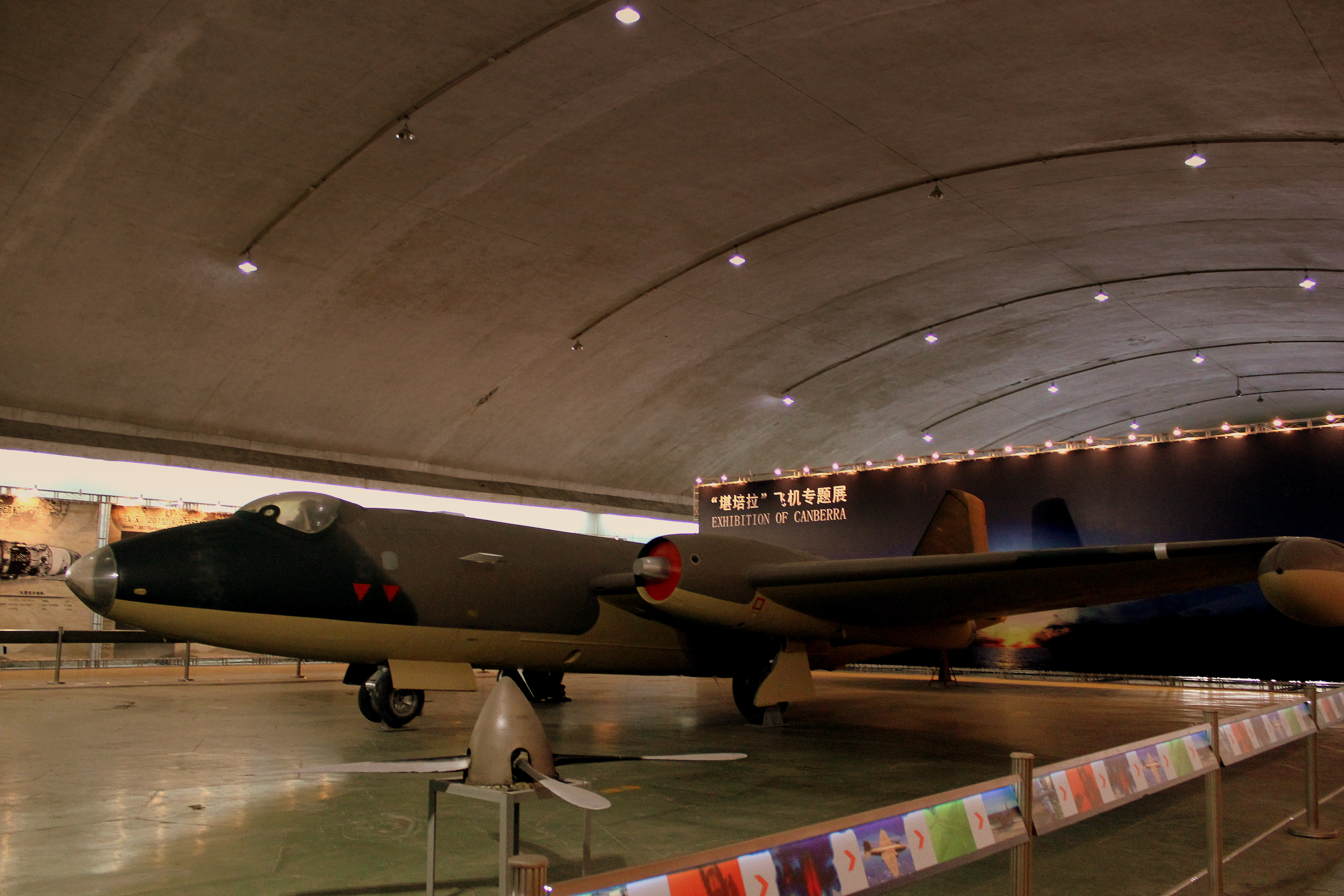
ex-Rhodesian Air Force English Electric Canberra B.2 at the Datangshan Aviation Museum, Beijing, 2012.

- De Havilland Vampire FB Mk9 single-seater fighter jet: 8 Vampire FB Mk9s in service, plus 13 Vampire FB.52s on loan from the South African Air Force (SAAF) used as fighter-bombers, occasionally employed on air attacks upon guerrilla bases in Mozambique.
- Hawker Hunter FGA.9 single-seater fighter jet: 12 in service; used as a fighter-bomber, occasionally employed on air attacks upon guerrilla bases in Zambia and Mozambique.
- English Electric Canberra B.2 Medium bomber jet: 8 in service; employed on air attacks upon guerrilla bases in Angola, Zambia, and Mozambique.
- De Havilland Vampire T.11 (DH.115) jet trainer: 8 in service.
- English Electric Canberra T.4 jet trainer: two in service.
- Marchetti SF.260C trainer aircraft (nicknamed "Genet"): 17 in service.
- North American AT-6 Harvard trainer aircraft: used early in the War; later sold to South Africa.
- Percival Provost Mk 52 trainer aircraft: 13 in service; used in the light attack role until replaced by the Reims-Cessna FTB 337G.
- Reims-Cessna FTB 337G "Push and Pull" light attack aircraft (nicknamed "Lynx"): 21 low-altitude surveillance aircraft in service, modified for precision ground attacks and used on Fireforce missions and occasionally on "externals" in Mozambique.
- Marchetti SF.260W light attack aircraft (nicknamed "Warrior"): 14 in service; used for light ground attack duties and escort of road convoys.
- Cessna 421A Golden Eagle light transport aircraft: one in service.
- Percival Pembroke C.1 light transport aircraft: two in service.
- Douglas C-47A Dakota military transport aircraft (nicknamed "DC-3 Dakota" or "Paradak"): 13 in service; used on Fireforce missions and "externals" in Zambia and Mozambique.
- Canadair DC-4M Argonaut passenger and cargo transport
- Douglas DC-7CF transport aircraft/airliner: one operated privately by the Rhodesian maverick aviator, gun-runner and agent for hire Jack Malloch in his clandestine "sanction-buster" freighting operations on behalf of the Rhodesian Air Force; used in October 1979 to insert a Rhodesian SAS free-fall pathfinder unit on an external operation to blow up a rail bridge over the Chambeshi River in Zambia.
- Britten-Norman BN-A Islander Utility aircraft/airliner: six ex-Portuguese aircraft clandestinely purchased from Mozambique in 1975-76.
- Beechcraft Baron 95 C-55 Utility aircraft: one in service.
- Aermacchi AL-60-B2L/AL-60F-5 Utility aircraft (nicknamed "Trojan" or "Trog"): 10 in service; used for light ground attack duties and Signals intelligence (SIGINT) missions.
- Cessna 185 Skywagon Light Utility aircraft: two civil aircraft impressed into service, about 17 aircraft on loan from the South African Air Force (SAAF).

=== Watercraft ===
- Double-ended ferry: one small armoured ferry boat named Ubique, armed with captured DShKM 12.7mm Heavy machine guns and other weapons, was operated by the Rhodesian Army's Corps of Engineers' Boat Squadron on Lake Kariba.
- Patrol launch: a number of patrol launches was operated by the BSAP's Boat Squadron on Lake Kariba and the Zambezi River.
- Zodiac rubber inflatable boat: used by the Rhodesian SAS on "externals" in Zambia.
- Klepper-type canoe: used by the Rhodesian SAS on "externals" in Zambia.

== ZIPRA/ZANLA equipment ==
=== Pistols ===
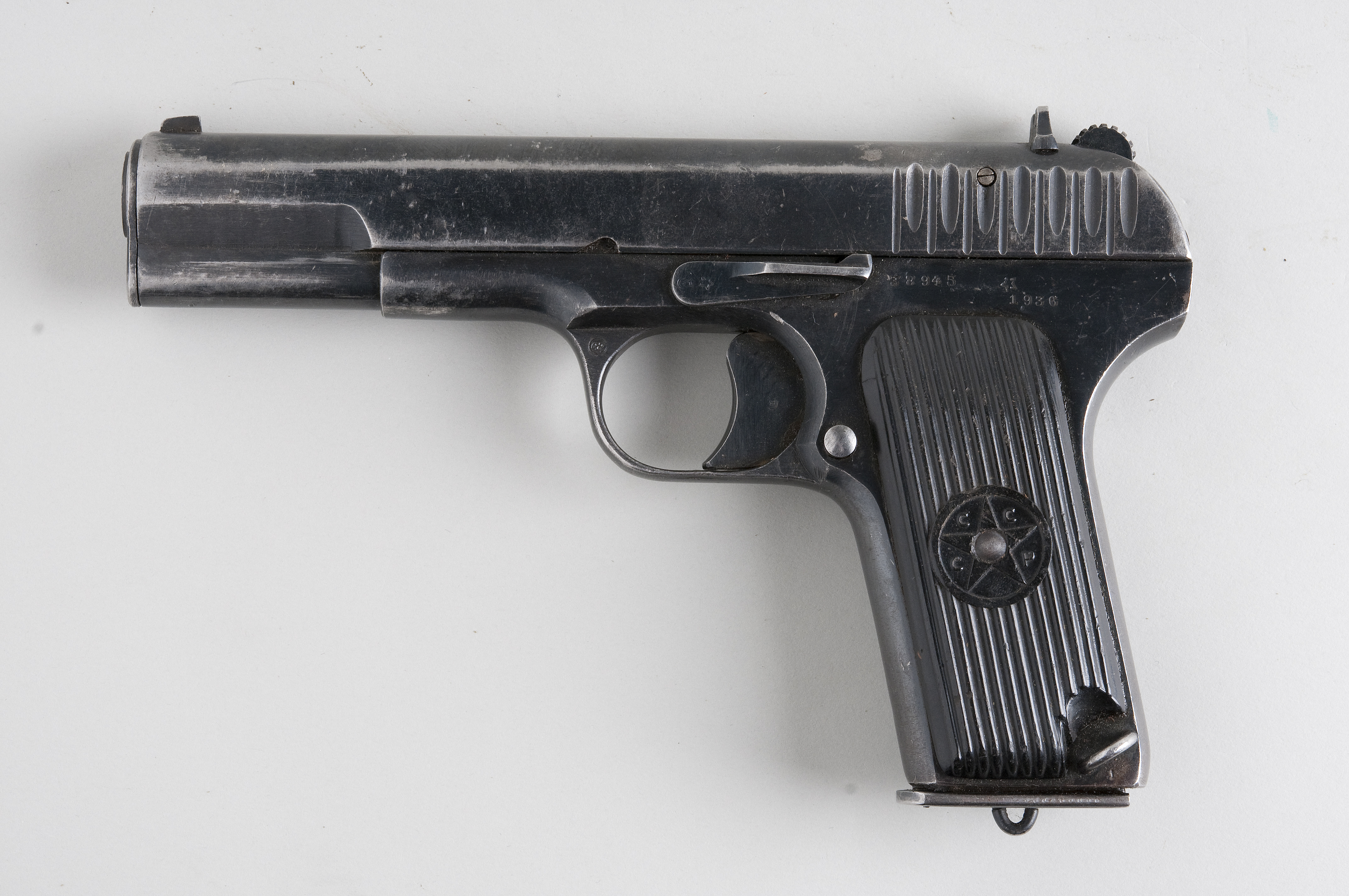
Tokarev TT-33 pistol

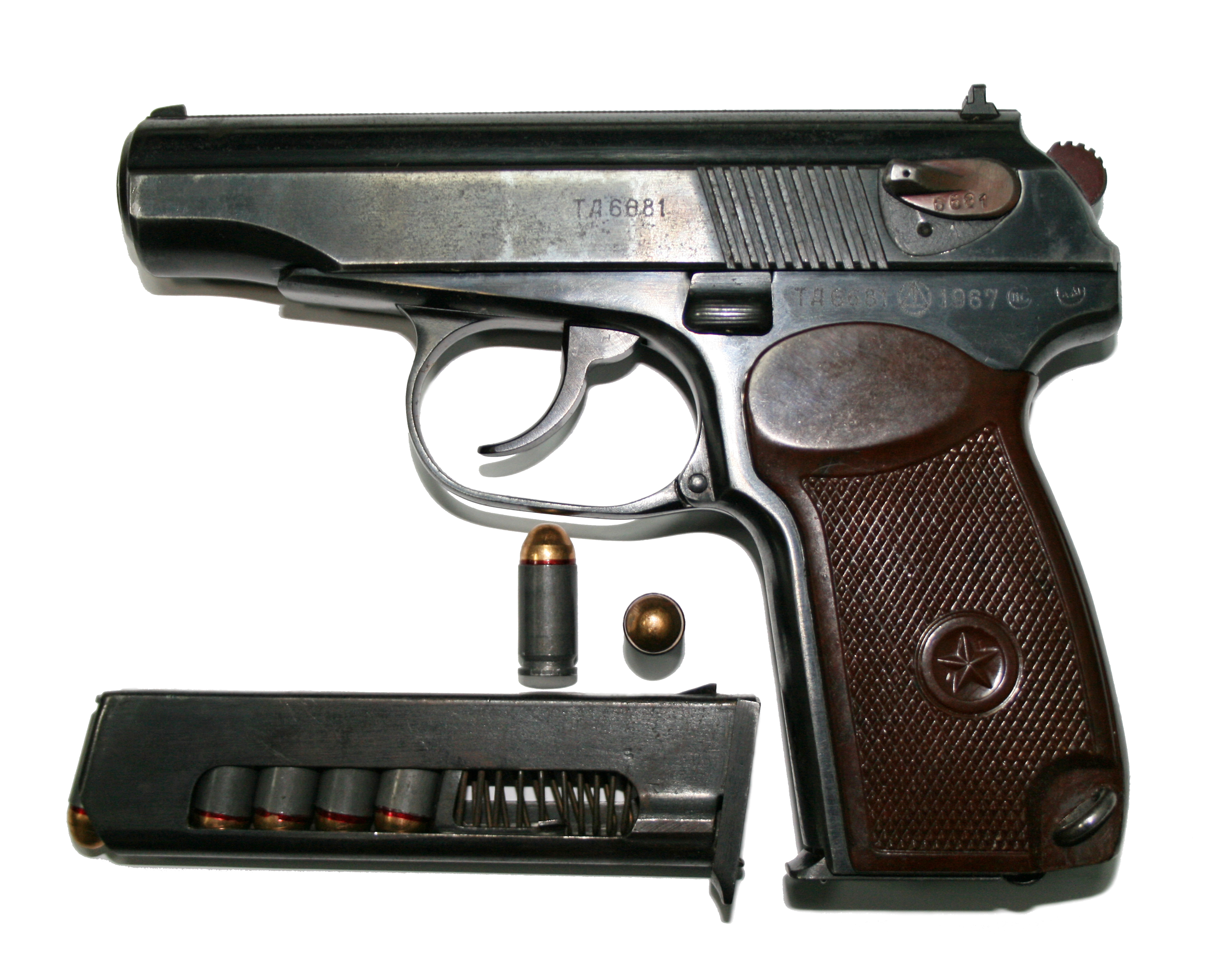
Makarov PM pistol

- Walther PPK: used early in the War.
- Luger P08 pistol: used early in the War.
- Tokarev TT-33
- Type 54 pistol (Chinese copy of the Soviet Tokarev TT-33)
- Makarov PM
- CZ 27
- CZ 52
- CZ 75

=== Submachine guns ===
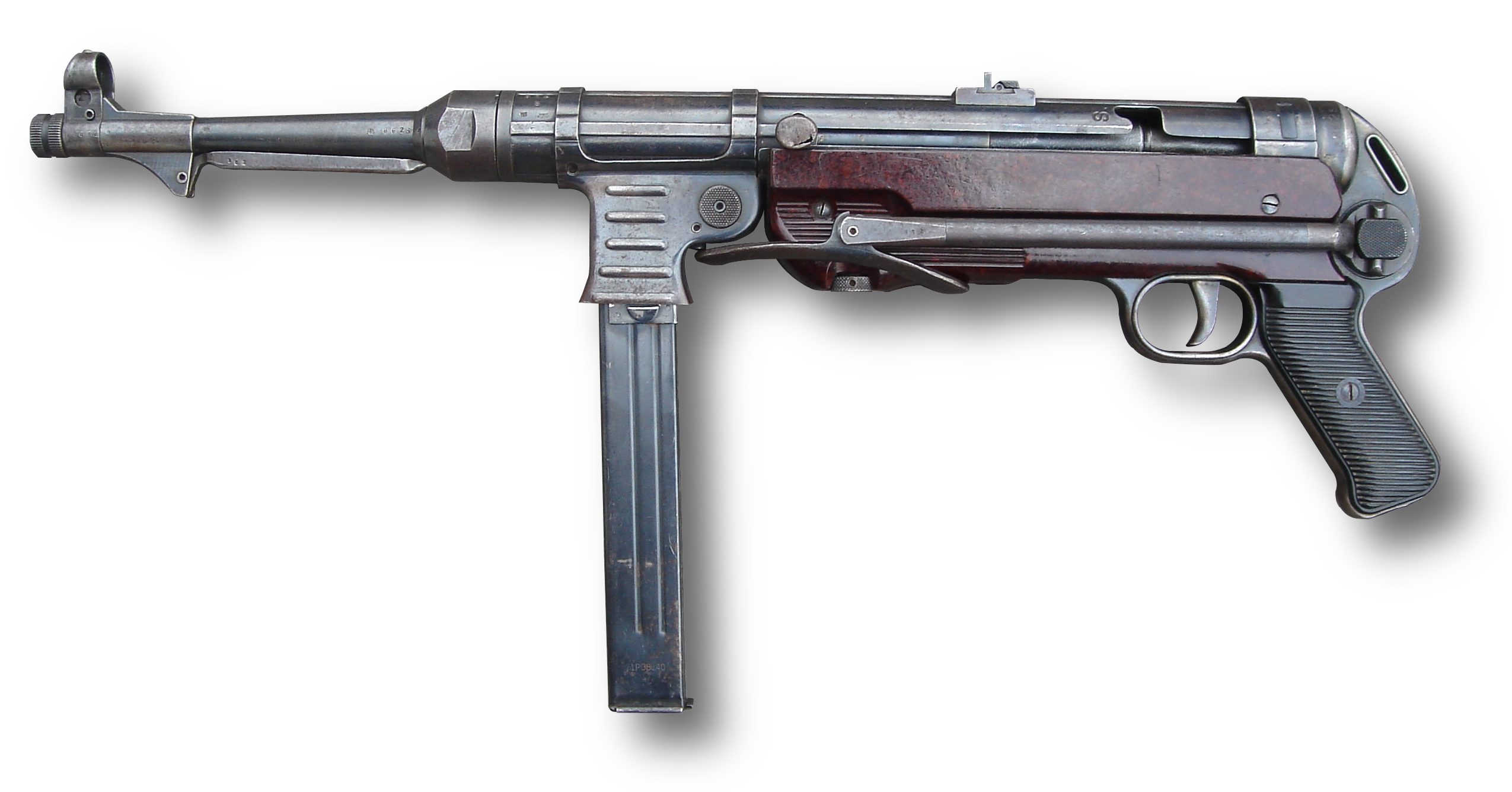
MP 40 Submachine gun

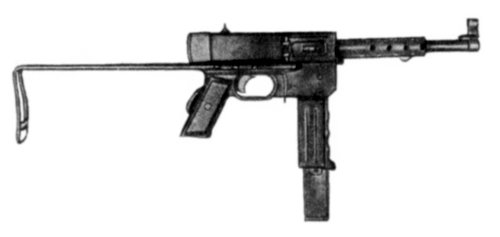
MAT-49 Submachine gun

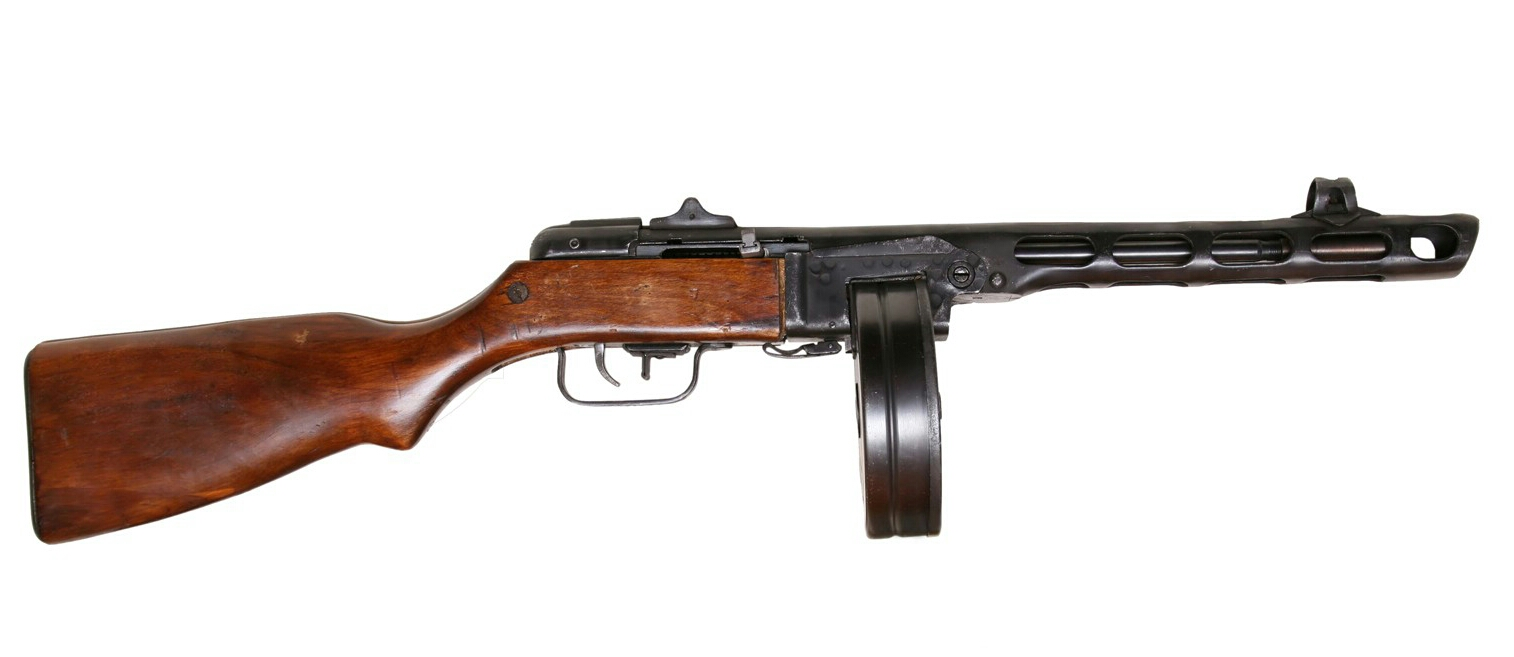
PPSh-41 Submachine gun

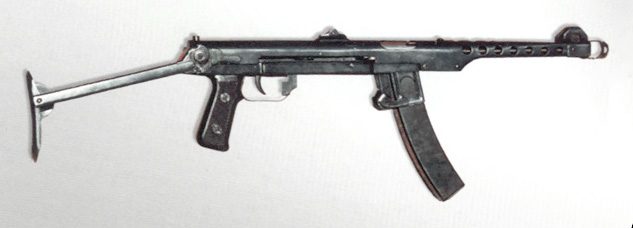
PPS-43 Submachine gun

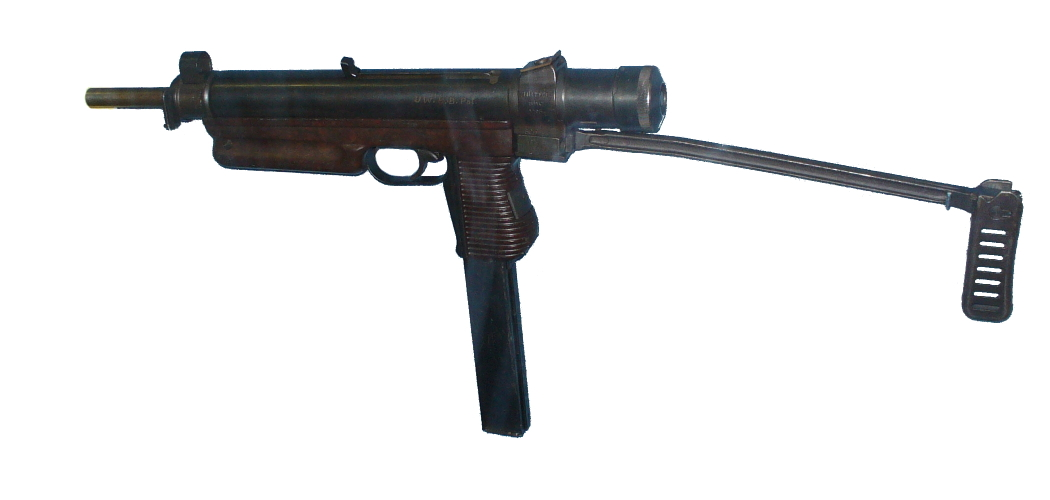
Sa vz. 23/25 Submachine gun

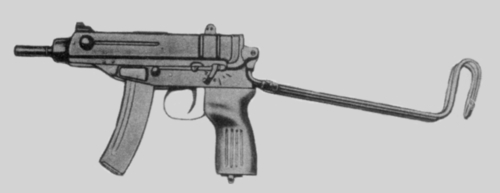
Škorpion vz. 61 Submachine gun

- MP 40: used early in the War.
- Sten Mk II: used early in the War.
- Lanchester Mk. 1: used early in the War.
- Thompson M1A1: used early in the War.
- MAT-49: used early in the War.
- Uzi: used early in the War.
- PPSh-41: used early in the War.
- PPS-43: used early in the War.
- Sa 25
- Škorpion vz. 61
- Stechkin APS

=== Bolt-action rifles ===
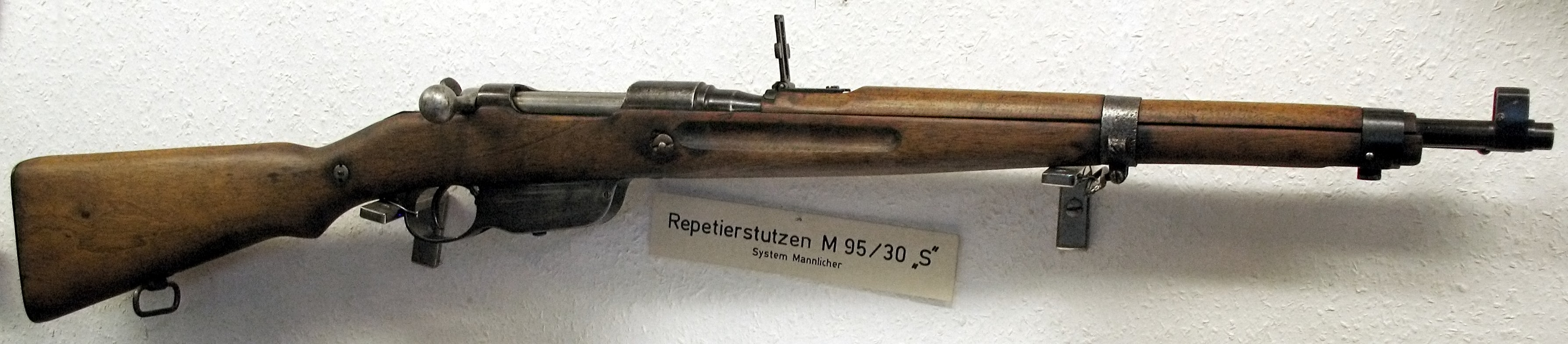
Steyr Mannlicher M95/30 rifle.

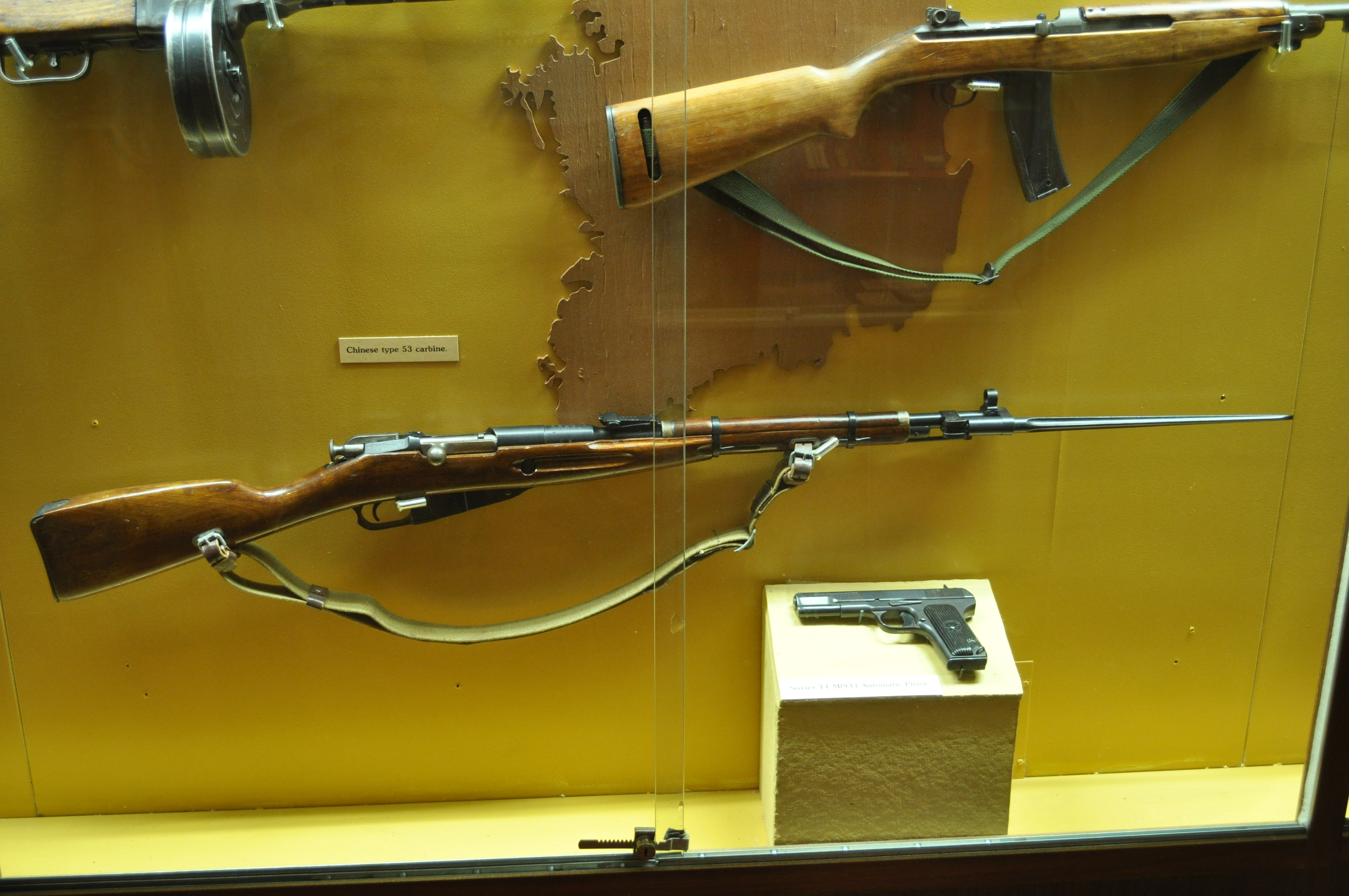
Chinese Type 53 carbine.

- Lee–Enfield SMLE Mk III: Captured.
- Mauser Karabiner 98k: used early in the War.
- M24 rifle: used early in the War.
- M1943 Czech carbine: used early in the War.
- Steyr Mannlicher M95/30 rifle: used early in the War.
- MAS-36 rifle: used early in the War.
- Type 53 carbine (Chinese copy of the Soviet Mosin–Nagant M1944 carbine)

=== Semi-automatic rifles ===
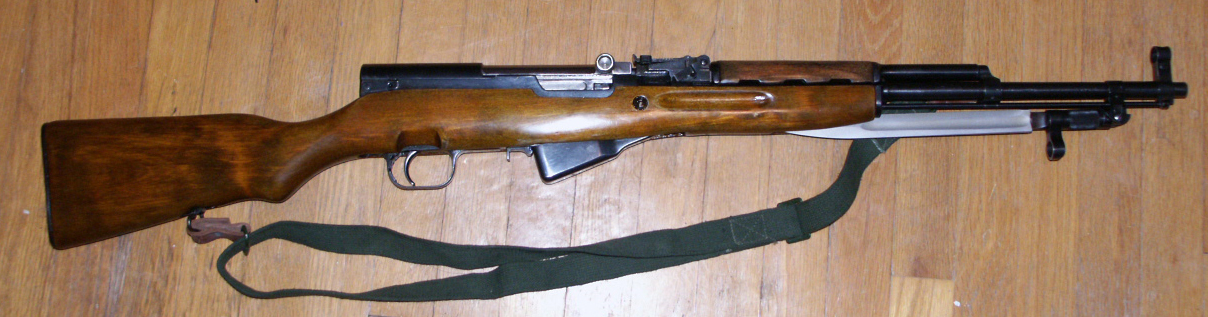
SKS semi-automatic rifles were used by the guerrillas before the full introduction of AK-47 and AKM assault rifles.

- MAS-49/56 carbine
- MAS-49 rifle
- SKS
- Type 56 semi-automatic rifle: Chinese copy of the Soviet SKS.
- vz. 52 rifle

=== Battle rifles ===
- FN FAL: Captured.
- Heckler & Koch G3: Captured Portuguese-produced m/961 and m/963 G3 versions provided to ZANLA by Mozambique after 1975.
- L1A1 Self-Loading Rifle

=== Assault rifles ===
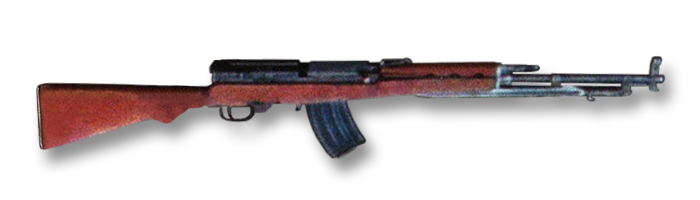
Type 63 assault rifle

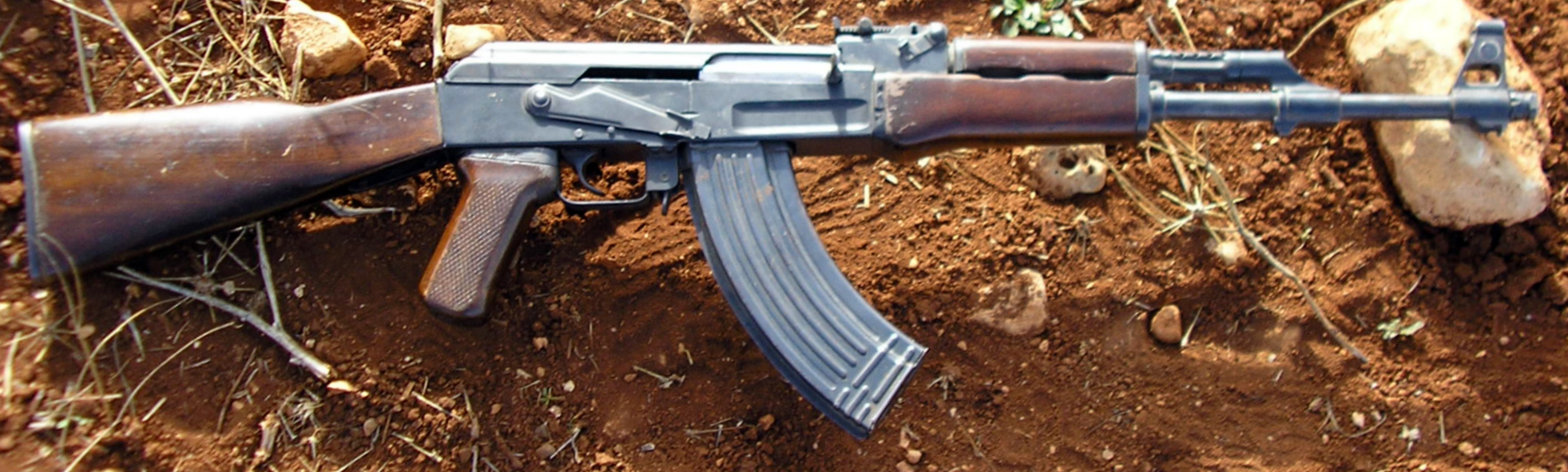
AK-47 assault rifle, widely used by the African guerrilla movements.

- AK-47 assault rifle (other variants included the AKS, the AKM and AKMS, the Chinese Type 56 and Type 56-1, the Hungarian AK-63 and AMD-65, the Romanian Pistol Mitralieră model 1963/1965, and former East German MPi-KM and MPi-KMS-72 assault rifles)
- vz. 58
- Type 63 assault rifle

=== Sniper rifles ===
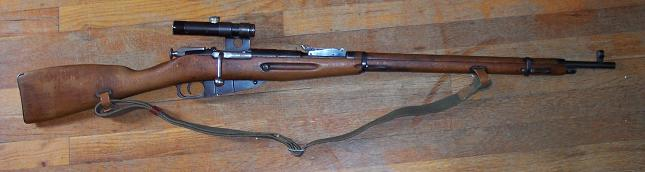
Hungarian M/52 rifle with PU 3.5× optics

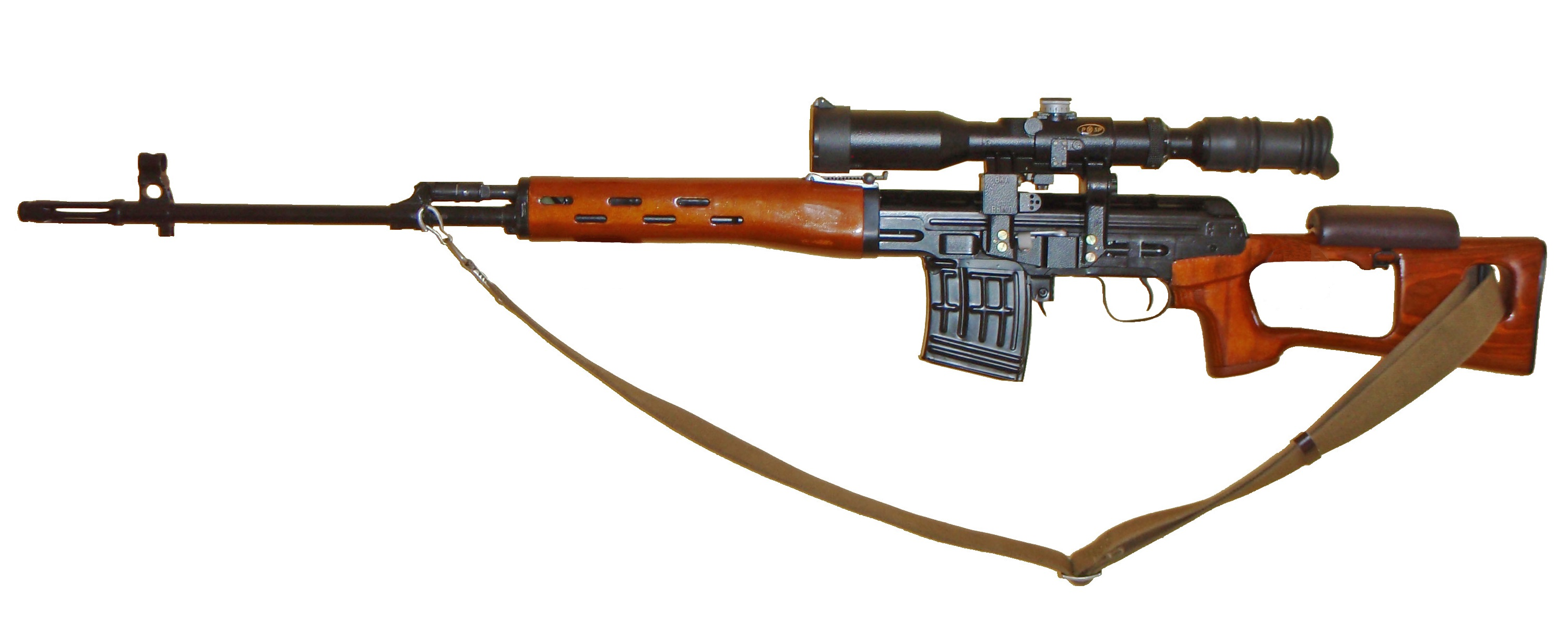
Dragunov SVD-63 sniper rifle

- M/52 rifle (Hungarian variant of the Mosin–Nagant Model 1891/30 sniper rifle)
- Dragunov SVD-63
- Winchester 30.06 sporting rifle

=== Light machine guns ===
- Bren Mark 3: some captured and re-issued by the ZIPRA early in the War.
- Degtyaryov DP-27/DP-28: used early in the War.
- RPD machine gun
- Type 56 light machine gun (Chinese copy of the RPD)
- RPK

=== General-purpose machine guns ===
- MG 34: used early in the War.
- UK vz. 59
- PK machine gun: used late in the War.

=== Medium and Heavy machine guns ===
- SG-43/SGM Goryunov medium machine gun: employed in both air defence and direct fire supporting roles.
- Type 53/57 medium machine gun (Chinese copies of the SG-43 and SGM): employed in both air defence and direct fire supporting roles.
- DShKM 12.7mm Heavy machine gun: employed in both air defence and direct fire supporting roles.
- Type 54 Heavy machine gun (Chinese copy of the DShKM): employed in both air defence and direct fire supporting roles.
- KPV 14.5mm Heavy machine gun: employed in both air defence and direct fire supporting roles.

=== Grenade systems ===
- No. 36 (Mills) fragmentation-type hand grenade
- Mk 2 "Pineapple" fragmentation hand/rifle grenade
- S13 hand grenade
- RG-42 fragmentation-type hand grenade
- F-1 hand grenade
- Type 1 hand grenade (Chinese copy of the Soviet F1 grenade)
- RGD-5 hand grenade
- Type 59 hand grenade (Chinese copy of the Soviet RGD-5 grenade)
- RG-4 anti-personnel grenade
- Type 67 stick grenade
- M60 anti-personnel rifle grenade

=== Land mine systems ===
- Disk Mine: Improvised explosive device made of two concave plough discs welded together around their edge to form a large discus, which was filled with explosives.
- No. 5 (Mark I) anti-personnel mine: used early in the War.
- Ploughshare anti-personnel mine: Captured; taken from the Rhodesian border minefields (CORSAN) by the guerrillas, who bundled and buried them stacked in roads about to be swept by the Pookie mine detection vehicle.
- PMD-6/6M wood box blast anti-personnel mine
- PMN-2/2M blast anti-personnel mine
- POMZ-2M stake mounted anti-personnel mine
- TMD-44 wood box blast anti-tank mine
- TMD-B wood box blast anti-tank mine
- TM-46 blast anti-tank mine fitted with an anti-handling device
- TMN-46 blast anti-tank mine fitted with an anti-handling device
- TM-57 blast anti-tank mine
- TMA-3 blast anti-tank mine
- PT Mi-Ba-III anti-tank mine

=== Bombs and explosive devices ===
- Molotov cocktail (a.k.a. Petrol bomb): used during riots and disturbances at urban areas (Petrol bombings).
- Letter bomb: explosive device sent via the postal service, designed with the intention to injure or kill the recipient when opened.
- Suitcase bomb: concealed explosive device made from a TMN-46 anti-tank mine used in bomb attacks at urban areas, such as the August 1977 Salisbury Woolworths bombing.
- Radio time bomb: portable commercial transistor radio receiver fitted by the guerrillas with explosives and a timing device that detonated after being activated, used in bomb attacks at urban areas.
- Seven- and 14-ounce Soviet TNT explosive slabs
- 200-gram and 400-gram TNT explosive blocks
- Trotyl explosive charge
- Gelignite (blasting gelatin)

=== Rocket systems ===
- DKB Grad-P 122mm Light portable rocket system
- SA-7b Grail surface-to-air missile: used late in the War by ZIPRA to bring down two Air Rhodesia's Vickers Viscount civilian airliners near the resort town of Kariba, the first in September 1978 (Flight RH825) and the second in February 1979 (Flight RH827).

=== Anti-tank rockets and Grenade launchers ===
- RPG-2 rocket-propelled grenade launcher
- RPG-7 rocket-propelled grenade launcher
- Type 69 RPG (Chinese version of the Soviet RPG-7)

=== Recoilless rifles ===
- Type 56 75 mm: Chinese copy of the US M20 recoilless rifle, used on occasions against military camps and INTAF Keeps.
- B-10 82 mm: used mainly in the defence of guerrilla staging-bases and training camps.
- B-11 107 mm: used mainly in the defence of guerrilla staging-bases and training camps.

=== Mortars ===
- Type 31 and Type 63 60 mm mortars: Chinese versions of the US M2 60mm infantry mortar, used on occasions against military camps and INTAF Keeps.
- 82-BM-37 82 mm infantry mortar
- Type 53 82 mm mortar: Chinese copy of the Soviet 82-PM-37 82mm mortar.
- 120-PM-43 120 mm heavy mortar
- Type 53 120 mm heavy mortar: Chinese copy of the Soviet 120-PM-43 120mm heavy mortar.

=== Anti-aircraft guns and autocannons ===
- ZPU-1 14.5mm AA autocannon: employed in both air defence and direct fire supporting roles, usually placed close to guerrilla staging-bases and training camps.
- ZU-23-2 twin-barrelled AA autocannon: employed in both air defence and direct fire supporting roles, usually placed close to guerrilla staging-bases and training camps.
- ZPU-4 14.5mm Quadruple-barrelled AA autocannon: employed in both air defence and direct fire supporting roles, usually placed close to guerrilla staging-bases and training camps.
- Zastava M55 A2 20mm triple-barrelled automatic anti-aircraft gun: employed in both air defence and direct fire supporting roles, usually placed close to guerrilla staging-bases and training camps.
- Type 65 37 mm twin-barrelled anti-aircraft gun: employed in the air defence role, usually placed close to guerrilla staging-bases and training camps.

=== Armoured vehicles ===
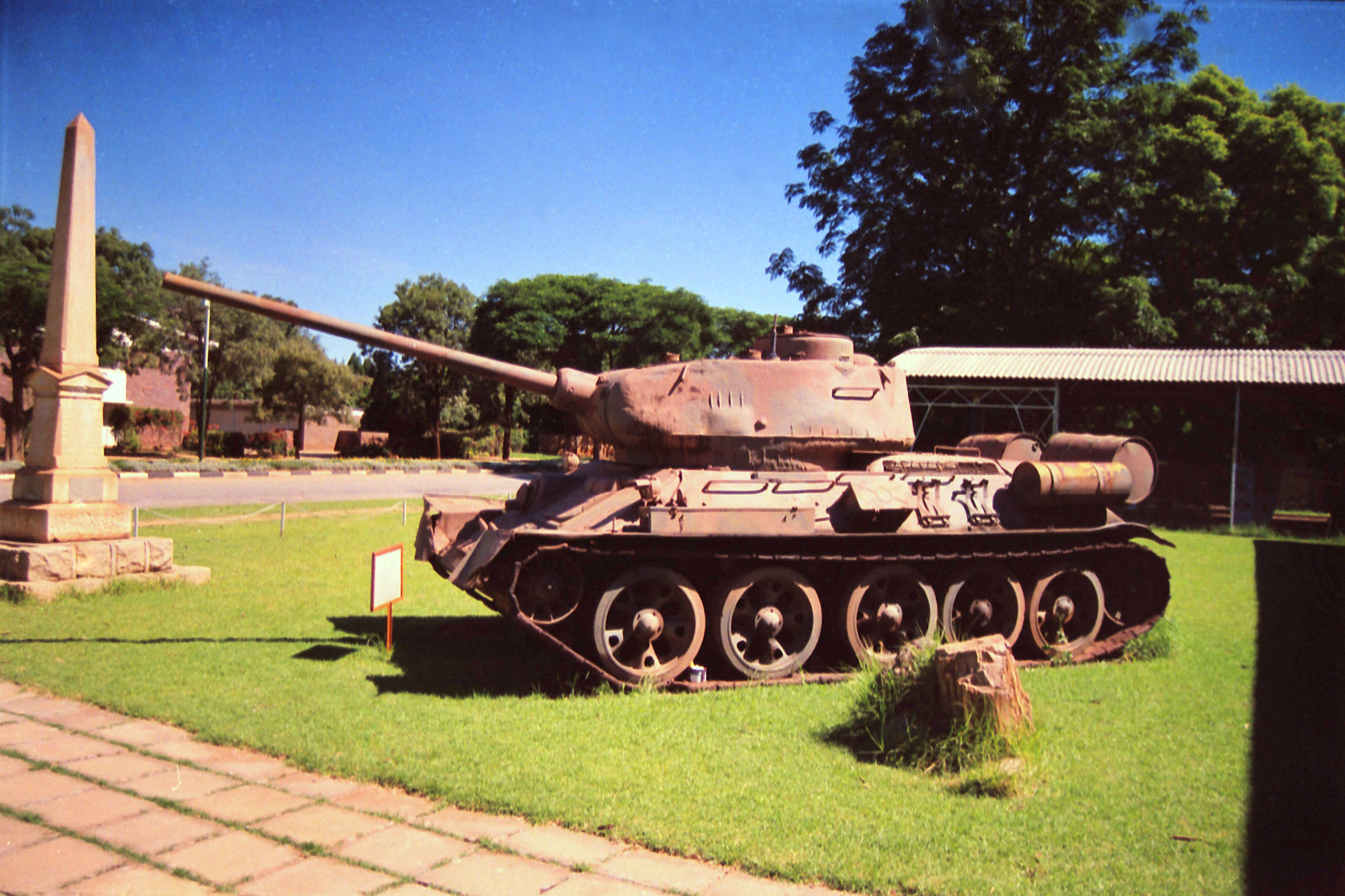
ex-ZIPRA T-34/85 medium tank at the Zimbabwe Military Museum, Gweru.

- BRDM-2 reconnaissance armoured car: limited use late in the War by ZIPRA.
- T-34/85 medium tank: limited use late in the War by ZIPRA.
- BTR-152 Armoured Personnel Carrier: limited use late in the War by ZIPRA and ZANLA.
- MTU-55 Armoured vehicle-launched bridge (AVLB): limited use late in the War by ZIPRA.

=== Transport vehicles ===
- Land Rover Series II light pickup
- Toyota Land Cruiser (FJ45-V/LV) station-wagon
- GAZ-69A (4×4) field car
- GAZ-66 light truck
- Unimog 404 light truck
- Scania-Vabis L71 Regent heavy-duty truck: used by ZANLA as a troop transport in Mozambique.

=== Aircraft ===
- Mikoyan-Gurevich MiG-17F fighter jet: provided by the Soviet Union; crated and stored by ZIPRA in Zambia, never deployed operationally.

=== Watercraft ===
- Dugout canoe
- Klepper-type canoe: used early in the War by ZIPRA.
- German "Pouch" canoe: 18-foot, four-man canvas folding canoe, used early in the War by ZIPRA.
- Flat-bottomed boat: used early in the War by ZIPRA.
- Steel boat: capable of carrying four men; used early in the War by ZANLA.
- Soviet inflatable rubber dinghy: used early in the War by ZIPRA.
- Inflatable raft: used early in the War by ZIPRA.

== See also ==
- Angolan Civil War
- Fireforce
- List of weapons of the Portuguese Colonial War
- Military history of Africa
- Mozambican Civil War
- Portuguese Colonial War
- Rhodesian Armoured Corps
- Rhodesian Security Forces
- Rhodesia and weapons of mass destruction
- Second Matabele War, officially known within Zimbabwe as the First Chimurenga
- South African Border War
