= A.P. Mine No.5 =

A.P. Mine No.5(mark I)
- Type: Anti-personnel mine
- Place of origin: Great Britain

Service history
- Used by: British Army; Rhodesian Security Forces
- Wars: World War II; Rhodesian Bush War

Specifications
- Height: 3.625in(9.2cm)
- Diameter: 2in(5.08cm)
- Filling: 50/50 Pentolite or RDX/TNT
- Filling weight: 6.75lb(3.06kg)

The A.P. Mine No. 5 was a British anti-personnel mine of World War II.

== Design ==
=== Parts ===
The mine itself is a cardboard cylinder to avoid detection by metal detectors. The mine trigger is a hollow ebonite rod on top of the mine, which in later versions is replaced with a circular steel pressure plate to increase the trigger area. Explosive filling is either 50/50 pentolite or RDX/TNT. To save the mine when not in use, a wooden plug is inserted in its fuse well.

=== Detonation process ===
The mine is activated by downward pressure on the top of the mine, for example by a soldier's foot. This forces down the ebonite rod on top of the mine which goes through the mine collar below it. This releases retaining balls that the collar was holding which in turn release the spring-loaded striker. This then pierces the No. 99 MK I detonator which activates booster charges on either side of it, detonating the mine.

=== Arming and disarming ===
To arm the mine, first off, if the wooden safety plug is still in the fuse well, remove it. Then insert the No. 99 detonator, and then insert the ebonite rod containing the striker (among other things) in the fuse well above the detonator. Make sure that no pressure is applied to the rod after insertion to avoid accidentally setting off the mine. To disarm the mine do the opposite of arming: remove the striker and then the detonator.

== See also ==
- List of weapons of the Rhodesian Bush War
