= Leif Östling =

Swedish businessman

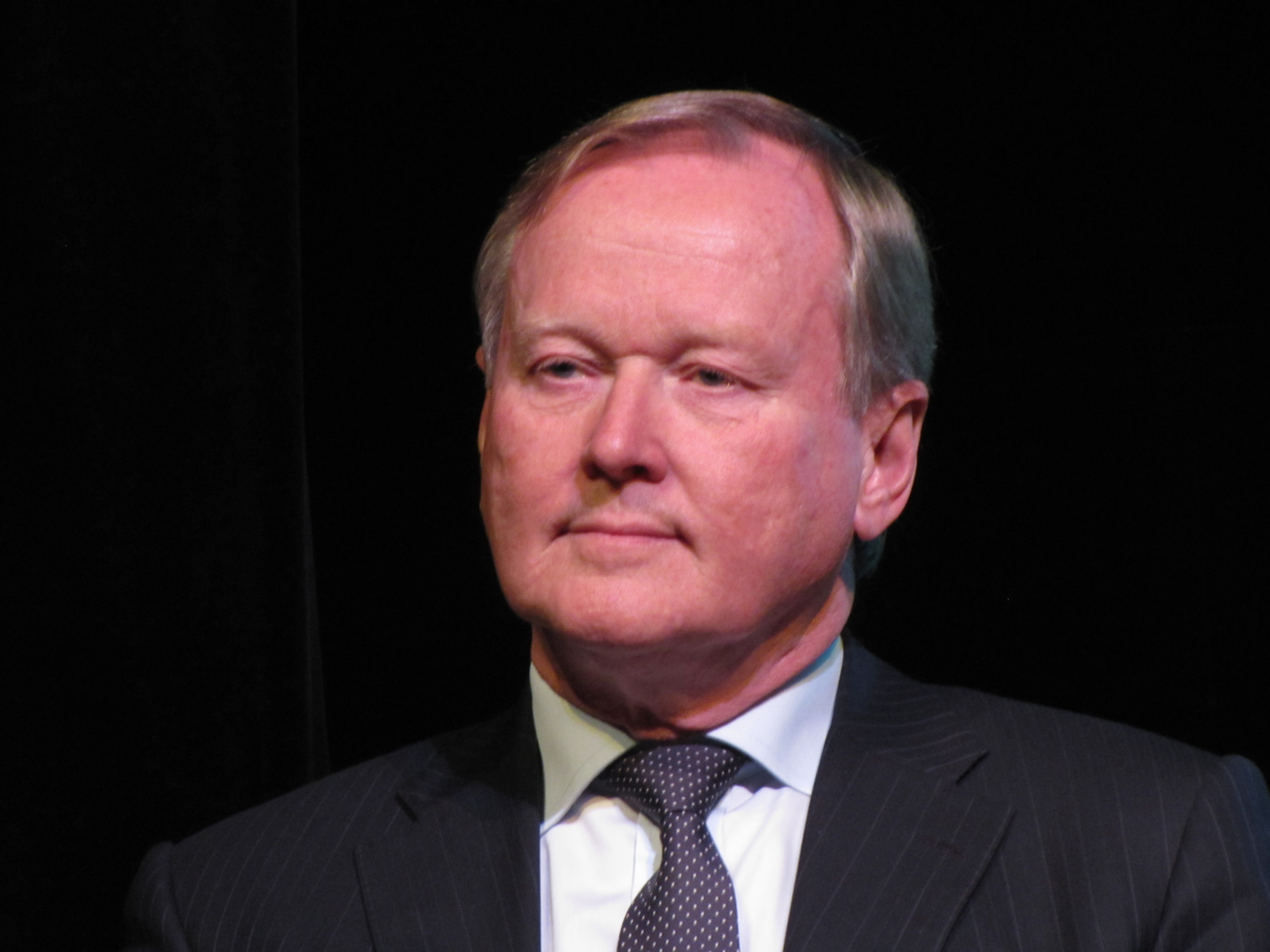
- Leif Östling at the distribution of the Gustaf Dalén Medal 2012.
- Born: 25 September 1945 (age 81); Luleå, Sweden

Academic work
- Institutions: Chalmers University of Technology; Gothenburg School of Business, Economics and Law

Leif Albert Östling (born 25 September 1945) is a Swedish chief executive officer and former head of the Scania AB truck company, owned by the German Volkswagen Group. In spring 2016, he was appointed Chairman of the Confederation of Swedish Enterprise, a post he left in advance in November 2017.

Östling has become known as a controversial political entrepreneur debater who makes bold statements. Over the years, he has separated politically from the time of youth when he belonged to the Swedish Social Democratic Youth League, SSU.

== Education and working life ==
Östling was born in Luleå. After graduating with a Master of Engineering degree (MEng) from the Chalmers University of Technology, Sweden, and a Bachelor of Economics degree (BEcon) from Gothenburg School of Business, Economics and Law, he came in 1972 to the Scania AB division in Saab-Scania, where he advanced through a variety of positions. Among other things, he was responsible for long-term planning before he was appointed head of Scania AB in the Netherlands in 1983. In 1989 he was appointed head of the Scania and in 1994 when Scania broke out of the Saab Scania group and became an independent corporation, he was appointed CEO. Östling left his post as CEO of Volkswagen Commercial Vehicles (which includes Scania AB) 2012 in connection with controversial statements that trade unions have no right of veto for a possible relocation of jobs. Östling continued on 1 September 2012 to a position in Volkswagen AG until September 2015.

When Scania's former main investor Investor AB in the year of 2000 agreed that Scania AB would merge with their biggest competitor Volvo Trucks, Östling opposed that merger, just as in the fall of 2006 he had opposed German MAN's plans to buy Scania AB. When the EU Commission, referring to the European Union competition law (Volvo Trucks / Scania AB would practically have a monopoly on the truck market in the Nordic countries), stopped the merger between Volvo Trucks and Scania AB, Östling won that battle and was able, with support from Scania's new owner Volkswagen, to remain in Scania as CEO. Also, the MAN SE bid for takeover was rejected by the main shareholders, and Östling could continue as CEO after the Annual general meeting in May 2007.

Leif Östling currently serves on the board of Modular Management.

== Controversies ==
In 2017 Östling participated in the SVT TV program Uppdrag granskning, which showed that he had placed money abroad to avoid Swedish taxation. Also his comment in connection with that, "Here you pay 20–30 million a year, what the hell do I get for the money?", was considered inappropriate from a chairman of the Confederation of Swedish Enterprise. Östling commented later on the following discussion with "We have got a very narrow sense of corridor in Sweden if all political parties consider the political system to have unlimited taxation rights without the right of citizens to question how the money is used."

Östling has said that he believes it is "genetically conditioned" that so few women enter the engineering profession. He has also expressed his belief that the threat of global warming has been exaggerated and that the phenomenon is possibly caused by natural processes, which completely opposes the scientific consensus on climate change.

== Prizes and awards ==
- In 2003, he was awarded an honorary doctorate at KTH, Stockholm and at Luleå University of Technology, Luleå.
- In 2004, he was elected as a member of the Royal Swedish Academy of Engineering Sciences.
- In 2009, he was appointed by Veckans Affärer 2008 years social capitalist.
- In 2012, he was awarded Gustaf Dalén Medal by "Chalmersska Ingenjörsföreningen".
