= Scania AB =

Swedish manufacturer of trucks, buses and engines

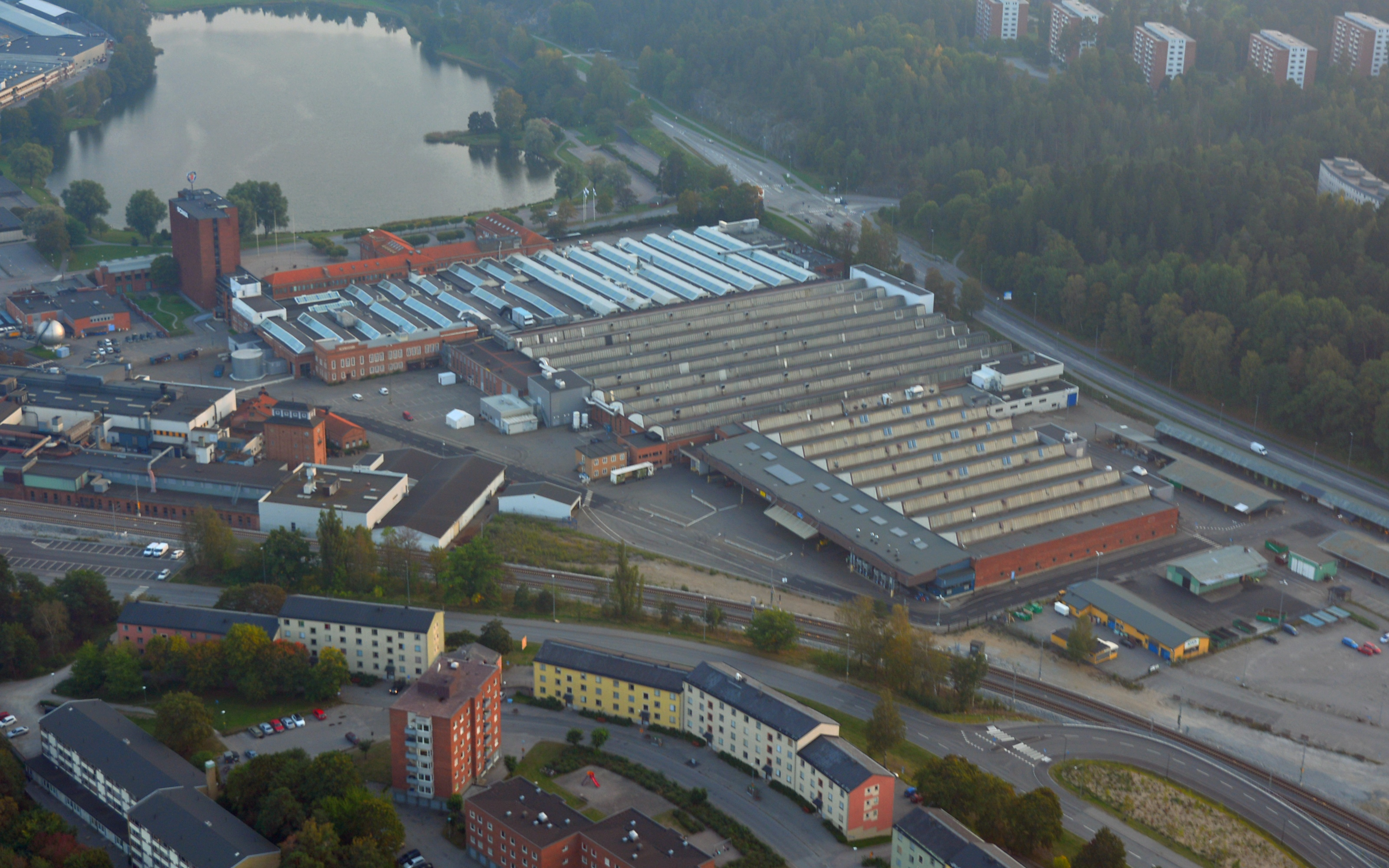
- Scania headquarters in Södertälje, Sweden
- Formerly: AB Scania-Vabis
- Type: Subsidiary
- Industry: Automotive
- Predecessors: Maskinfabriks-aktiebolaget Scania; Vabis
- Founded: 1911; 115 years ago
- Founders: Surahammars Bruk and Philip Wersén (Vabis, 1891); Humber Limited (Maskinfabriks-aktiebolaget Scania, 1900)
- Headquarters: Södertälje, Sweden
- Number of locations: 10
- Area served: Worldwide
- Key people: Michael Jackstein (Chairman); Christian Levin (President and CEO)
- Products: Commercial vehicles (trucks and buses); Bus and coach chassis; Diesel and alternative-fuel engines; Electric and hybrid drivetrains
- Services: Financing, leasing and insurance
- Revenue: 198.5 billion kr (2025)
- Operating income: 21.3 billion kr (2025)
- Number of employees: 53,000 (2025)
- Parent: Traton
- Website: www.scania.com

Scania AB (/ˈskæniə/ SKAN-ee-ə, Swedish: [ˈskɑ̌ːnɪa]), stylised SCANIA, is a Swedish manufacturer of heavy trucks, buses and engines headquartered in Södertälje, Sweden. The company develops commercial vehicles for long-distance haulage, construction and regional distribution, as well as engines and power solutions for marine and industrial applications. Scania is a subsidiary of Traton, part of the Volkswagen Group.

In 2025, Scania reported net sales of SEK 198.5 billion and an adjusted operating result of SEK 21.3 billion, corresponding to a return on sales of 10.7%. Deliveries amounted to 94,073 vehicles worldwide. The company employed nearly 53,000 people and operated in more than 100 countries. During the year, 602 zero-emission vehicles were delivered.

Scania operates production facilities in Europe, South America and Asia, and inaugurated a manufacturing hub in Rugao, China in October 2025. Its global operations include vehicle assembly, component manufacturing and financial services.

In 2025, Scania published its first Sustainability Statement aligned with the European Sustainability Reporting Standards (ESRS) under the EU’s Corporate Sustainability Reporting Directive (CSRD).

It was listed on the NASDAQ OMX Stockholm stock exchange from 1996 until its delisting in 2014.

Scania's logo shows a griffin, from the coat of arms of the province of Scania (Swedish: Skåne).

== History ==
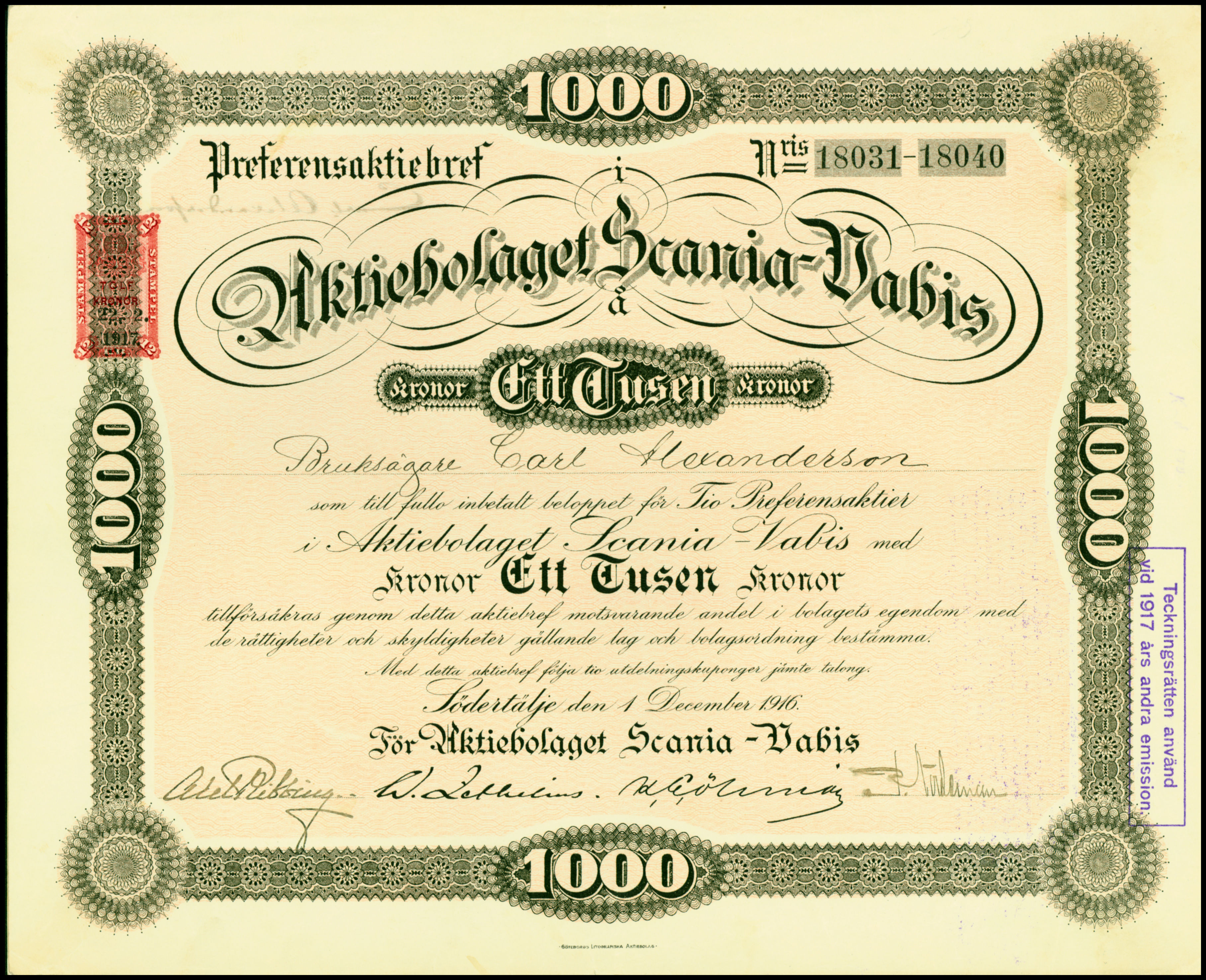
Scania-Vabis share, issued 1916

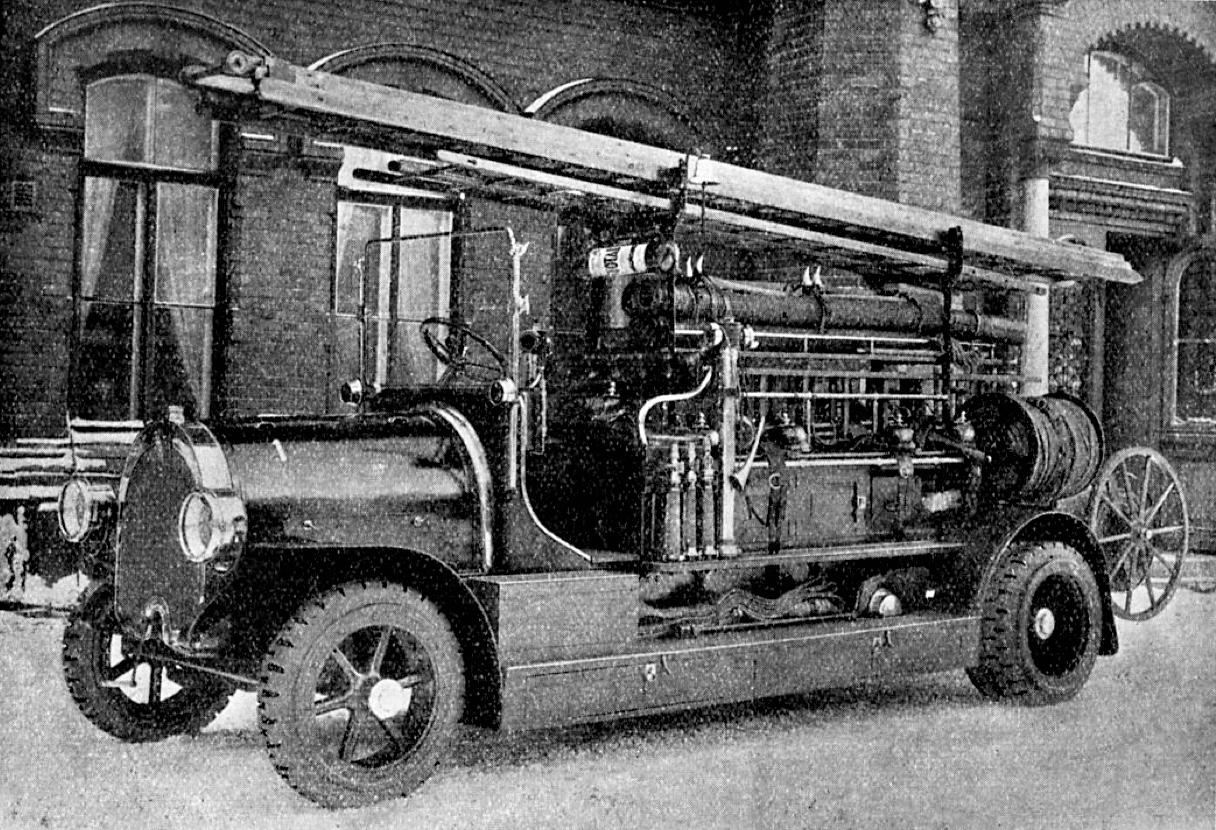
Scania-Vabis Fire truck (1924)

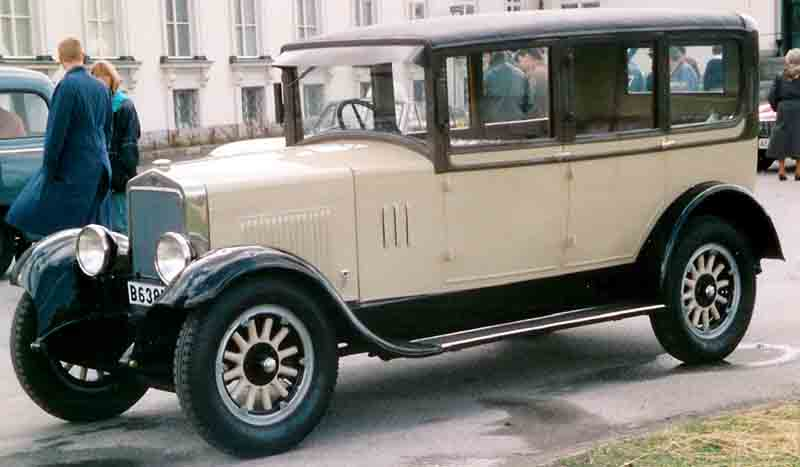
Scania-Vabis 2122 1929

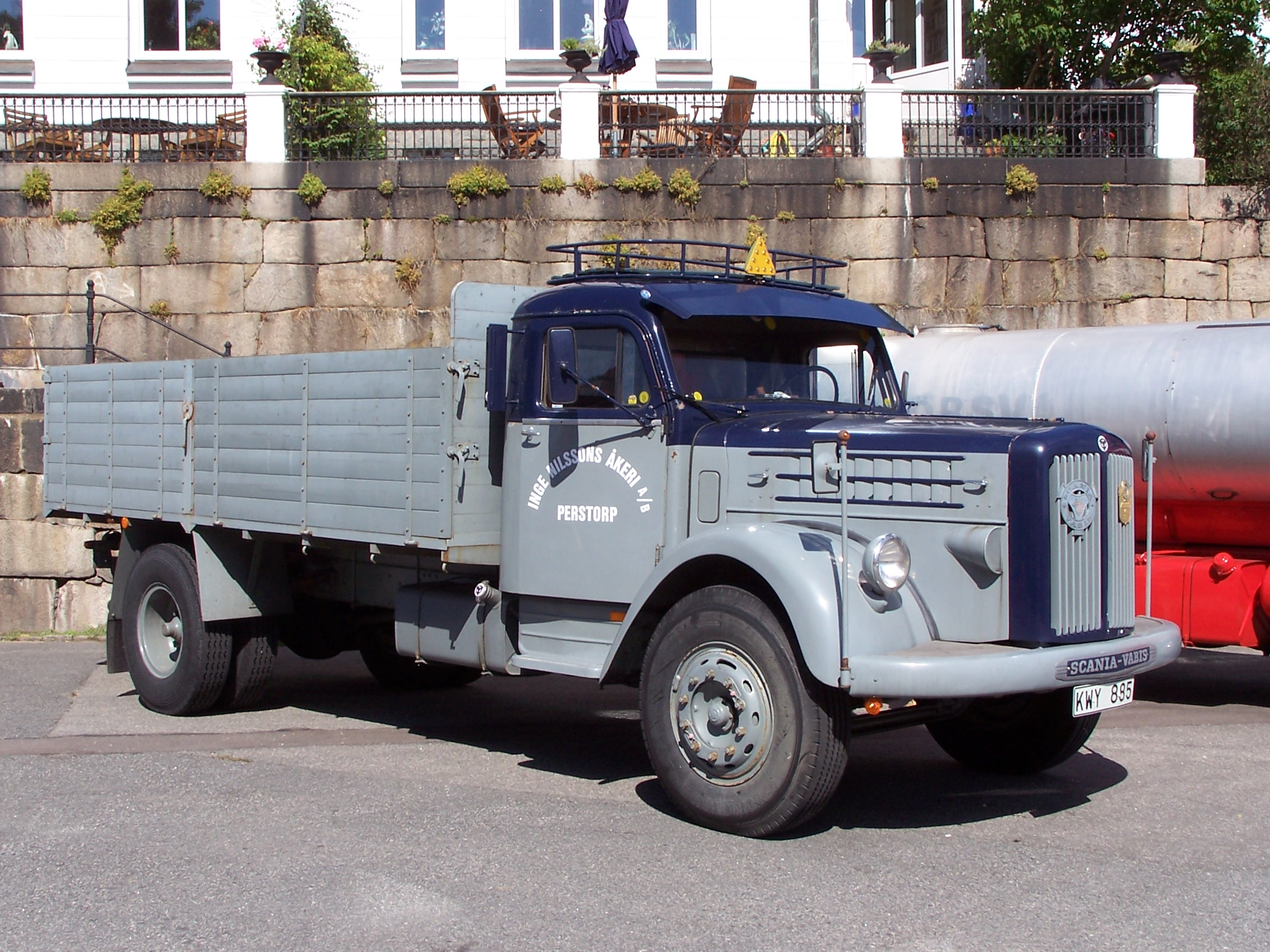
Scania-Vabis L71 1957

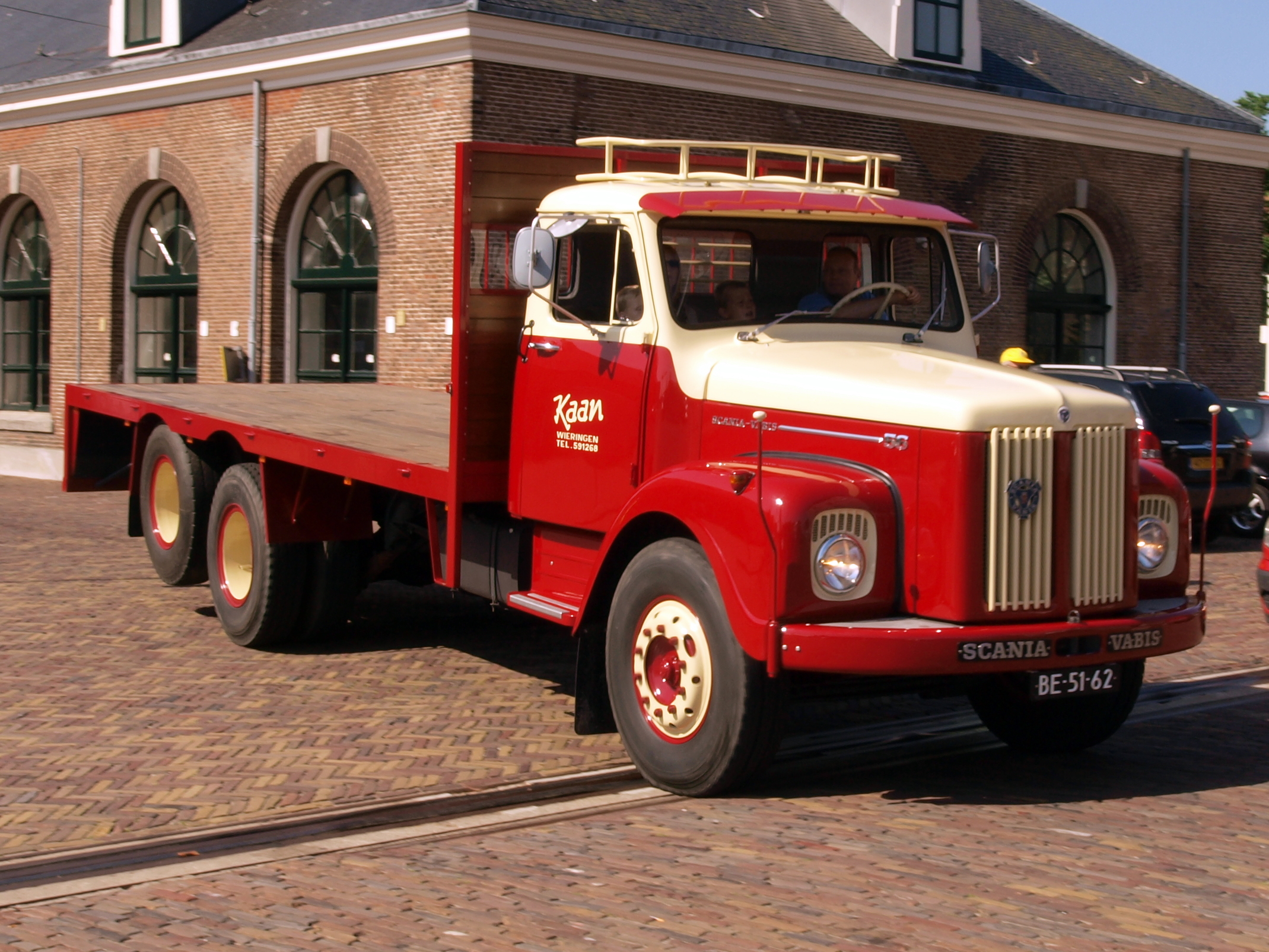
Scania-Vabis LS5646 1967

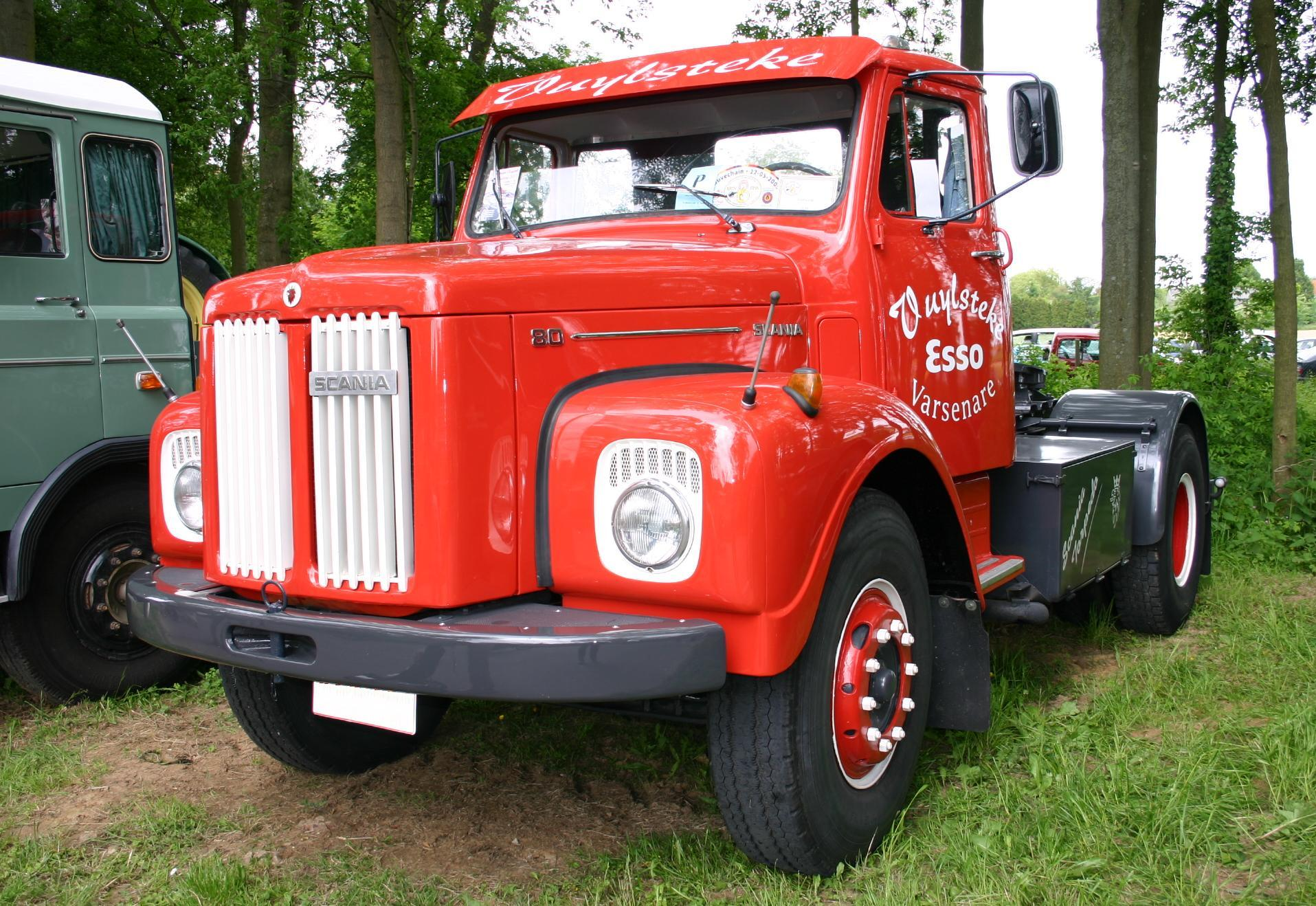
A vintage Scania truck (L80 successor to the Scania-Vabis L56)

=== Vabis and Maskinfabriks-aktiebolaget Scania ===
AB Scania-Vabis was established in 1911 as the result of a merger between Södertälje-based Vabis and Malmö-based Maskinfabriks-aktiebolaget Scania. Vagnfabriks Aktiebolaget i Södertelge (Vabis) was established as a railway car manufacturer in 1891, while Maskinfabriks-aktiebolaget Scania was established as a bicycle manufacturer in 1900. Both companies had tried their luck at building automobiles, trucks and engines, but with varied success. In 1910, Maskinfabriks-aktiebolaget Scania had succeeded in constructing reliable vehicles, while Vabis was at the brink of closing down. An offer from Per Alfred Nordeman, managing director of Maskinfabriks-aktiebolaget Scania, to steel manufacturer Surahammars Bruk, owner of Vabis, led to an agreement in November 1910, and in 1911 the merger was a reality.

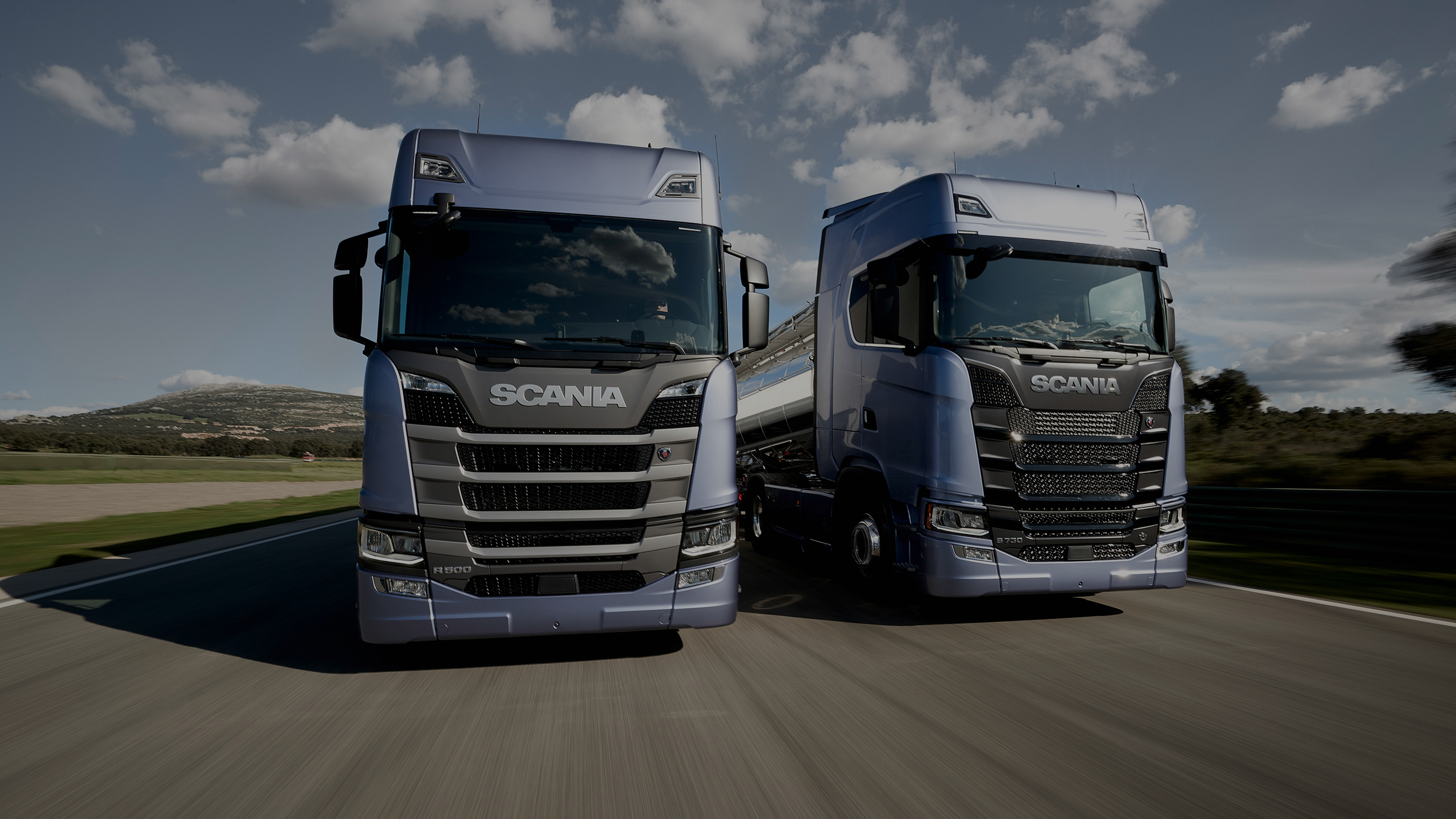
The new generation Scania S series (right) R series (left)

Development and production of engines and light vehicles were set to Södertälje, while trucks were manufactured in Malmö. The company's logo was redesigned from Maskinfabriks-aktiebolaget Scania's original logo with the head of a griffin, the coat of arms of the Swedish region Scania (Skåne), centered on a three-spoke bicycle chainset. Initially the headquarters were located in Malmö, but in 1912 they were moved to Södertälje.

=== First World War and 1920s ===
Because there were many inexpensive, imported cars in Sweden at the time, Scania-Vabis decided to build high-class, luxury cars, for instance the type III limousine from 1920 that had a top hat holder in the roof. Prince Carl of Sweden owned a 1913 Scania-Vabis 3S, a type which was fitted with in-car buttons so the passenger could communicate with the driver. Scania-Vabis also built two-seat sports cars (or "sportautomobil").

For the next few years the company's profits stagnated, with around a third of their orders coming from abroad. The outbreak of the First World War, however, changed the company, with almost all output being diverted to the Swedish Army. By 1916, Scania-Vabis was making enough profit to invest in redeveloping both of their production facilities.

Following the war, in 1919, Scania decided to focus completely on building trucks, abandoning other outputs including cars and buses. However, the post-war market was affected by an influx of surplus military vehicles, and by 1921 the company had declared bankruptcy.

After some economic difficulties in 1921, new capital came from Stockholms Enskilda Bank owned by the Wallenberg family, and Scania-Vabis became a solid and technically, high standing, company.

Denmark

Towards the end of 1913, the company established a subsidiary in Denmark. The following year the first Danish-built car, a four-seater Phaeton, was built at the company's Frederiksberg factory in Copenhagen. In 1914, the factory produced Denmark's first Scania-Vabis truck, and following this developed a V8 engine, one of the first in the world. In 1921, having sold around 175 trucks, and 75 cars, ... the Danish operation was closed down.

Norway

In 1917 an agreement was established with the newly formed Norwegian company Norsk Automobilfabrik A/S about production under license of Scania-Vabis cars and lorries. Production began in 1919, but was ended in 1921 after production of only 77 lorries, mostly built from Swedish produced parts.

=== 1930s and 1940s ===
During the Second World War, Scania produced a variety of military vehicles for the Swedish Army, including Stridsvagn m/41 light tanks produced under licence.

=== 1950s and 1960s ===
During the 1950s, the company expanded its operations into new customer segments, becoming agents for the Willys Jeep and the Volkswagen Beetle, the latter being very profitable for Scania-Vabis. It also started to become a genuine competitor to Volvo with their new L71 Regent truck which was introduced in 1954.

During this period, Scania-Vabis expanded its dealer network and country-wide specialist workshop facilities. By the end of the 1950s, their market-share in Sweden was between 40 and 50%, and was achieving 70% in the heaviest truck sector – helped by the entrepreneurial efforts of their dealers into the haulier market.

Probably their largest impact was in export markets. Before 1950, exports accounted for only 10 percent of production output, but a decade later, exports were at 50% of output. Beers in the Netherlands became a very important partner. Beers became official importers for Scania-Vabis in the Netherlands, and established a dealer network, along with training programmes for both mechanics and drivers. Beers also offered free twice-yearly overhauls of their customers vehicles, and offered a mobile service throughout the Netherlands with their custom-equipped service trucks. Due to Beers concerted efforts, Scania-Vabis market share in the country remained at a consistent 20% throughout this period. Scania-Vabis were to adopt the business model of Beers in their own overseas sales operations.

The 1960s saw Scania-Vabis expanding its production operations into overseas locations. Until now, all Scania-Vabis production had been carried out solely at Södertälje, but the 1960s saw the need to expand production overseas. Brazil was becoming a notable market for heavy trucks, and was also dependent on inter-urban buses, with particular requirement for Brazil's mountainous roads which became nigh-on impassable at times. On 2 July 1957, Brazilian subsidiary Scania-Vabis do Brasil S.A. (today known as Scania Latin America Ltda.) was established and started assembling some vehicles themselves in 1958. On 29 May 1959, a new engine plant was inaugurated in the Ipiranga district of São Paulo, and from June 1960, Scania-Vabis do Brasil assembled all vehicles themselves. Scania-Vabis vehicles had already been assembled in Brazil by a local company called Vemag (Veículos e Máquinas Agrícolas S.A.) for several years. Scania-Vabis established its first full manufacturing plant outside Södertälje, by building a new facility in São Bernardo do Campo near São Paulo, which was opened on 8 December 1962, and this was to set the standard for Scania-Vabis international operations.

Closer to home, the recently formed European Economic Community (EEC) offered further opportunities. Based on their now strong presence in the Dutch markets, Scania-Vabis constructed a new plant in Zwolle, which was completed in 1964. This new Dutch facility provided Scania-Vabis with a stepping stone into the other five EEC countries, particularly the German and French markets.

In 1966, Scania-Vabis acquired ownership of a then valuable supplier – Be-Ge Karosserifabrik, who were based in Oskarshamn. Be-Ge had been making truck cabs since 1946, and had been supplying cabs not only to Scania-Vabis, but also to their Swedish competitors Volvo. It was normal practice for truck manufacturers to outsource production of cabs to independent bodybuilders, so their acquisition by Scania-Vabis seemed a good move. Be-Ge owner Bror Göthe Persson had also established an additional cab factory at Meppel.

Scania-Vabis continued their expansion of production facilities through acquisitions. In 1967, they acquired Katrineholm based coachwork company Svenska Karosseriverkstäderna (SKV), and created a new subsidiary, Scania-Bussar. A year later, all bus production, along with R&D was moved to Katrineholm. Further production locations were added at Sibbhult and Falun, and Scania's employee numbers rose, particularly at Södertälje, which was to help double the town's population.

Scania-Vabis at some point in their history also manufactured trucks in Botswana, Brazil, South-Korea, Tanzania, the Netherlands, Zimbabwe and the United States.

For some time Daimler-Benz waged a 'logo war' with Scania-Vabis, claiming a possible confusion between the Scania-Vabis 'pedal crank' design featuring on Scania bicycles around 1900 and the Mercedes 'three-pointed star'. In 1968, Daimler-Benz won and the Scania-Vabis logo changed to a simple griffin's head on a white background.

In February 1968, a new range of trucks was launched, and at the same time the company was rebranded as just Scania. In addition to Vabis disappearing from the name and a new logo, all current models received new model designations.

=== 1970s and 1980s ===
In 1976, the Argentine industrial complex was launched. A few months later, on 10 September, the first gearbox outside of Sweden was manufactured and finally in December an L111 truck became the first Scania made in Argentina. Soon the plant specialised in the production of gearboxes, axles and differentials that equipped both the units produced in Tucumán and those built in Brazil.

Also in Argentina, in 1982 the Series 2 was launched as part of the "Scania Program", consisting of the T-112 and R-112 trucks with two cab versions and different options in engine and load capacity. In 1983, was launched the K112 made in Tucuman (like the rest models) for replace the BR-116.

In mid-1985 Scania entered the US market for the first time (aside from having sold 12,000 diesel engines installed in Mack trucks from 1962 until 1975), starting modestly with a goal of 200 trucks in all of 1987 (121 trucks were sold during calendar year 1986). Scania limited their marketing to New England, where conditions resemble those in Europe more closely.

Many examples of Scania, Vabis and Scania-Vabis commercial and military vehicles can be seen at the Marcus Wallenberg-hallen (the Scania Museum) in Södertälje.

== Presidents and CEOs ==
- Leif Östling (1994–2012)
- Martin Lundstedt (2012–2015)
- Henrik Henriksson (2016–2021)
- Christian Levin (2021–present)

== Ownership ==
=== Saab-Scania AB (1969–1995) ===
On 1 September 1969, Scania merged with Saab AB, and formed Saab-Scania AB. When Saab-Scania was split in 1995, the name of the truck and bus division changed simply to Scania AB. One year later, Scania AB was introduced on the stock exchange, which resulted in a minor change of name to Scania AB (publ).

=== Aborted Volvo takeover ===
On 7 August 1999, Volvo announced it had agreed to acquire a majority share in Scania. Volvo was to buy the 49.3% stake in Scania that was owned by Investor AB, Scania's then main shareholder. The acquisition, for US$7.5 billion (60.7 billion SEK), would have created the world's second-largest manufacturer of heavy trucks, behind DaimlerChrysler. The cash for the deal was to come from the sale of Volvo's car division to Ford Motor Company in January 1999.

The merger failed, after the European Union disapproved, announcing one company would have almost 100% market share in the Nordic markets.

=== Aborted MAN takeover ===
In September 2006, the German truckmaker MAN AG launched a €10.3bn hostile offer to acquire Scania AB. Scania's CEO Leif Östling was forced to apologise after comparing the bid of MAN to a "Blitzkrieg". MAN AG later dropped its hostile offer, but in January 2008, MAN increased their voting rights in Scania to 17 percent.

=== Volkswagen Group era ===
The German automotive company Volkswagen Group gained ownership of Scania by first buying Volvo's stake in 2000, after the latter's aborted takeover attempt, increasing it to 36.4% in the first quarter 2007. It then bought out Investor AB in March 2008, raising its share to 68.60%

The deal was approved by regulatory bodies in July 2008. Scania then became the ninth marque in the Volkswagen Group. By 1 January 2015, the Volkswagen Group controlled 100% of the shares in Scania AB. In 2018, Volkswagen Truck & Bus was rebranded Traton.

== Controversies ==
=== Price-fixing fines ===
In September 2017, Scania was fined 880 million euros (8.45bn Swedish krona) by the EU for taking part in a 14-year price fixing cartel. The other five members of the cartel – Daimler, DAF, MAN, Iveco and Volvo/Renault – settled with the commission in 2016.

=== Business in Russia ===
On 13 September 2022, Following the Russian invasion of Ukraine in February 2022, Scania declared a cease of operations since the 13 September 2022 in Russia after export sanctions and restrictions were enacted on Russia making it not profitable. In March, Scania stopped deliveries of trucks and parts to Russia, and all production in the country. Scania announced the sale of assets of their company in Russia for 560 million USD, thus dissolving their Russian branch. They sold their assets in Russia to local partners.

== Products ==
=== Trucks and special vehicles ===
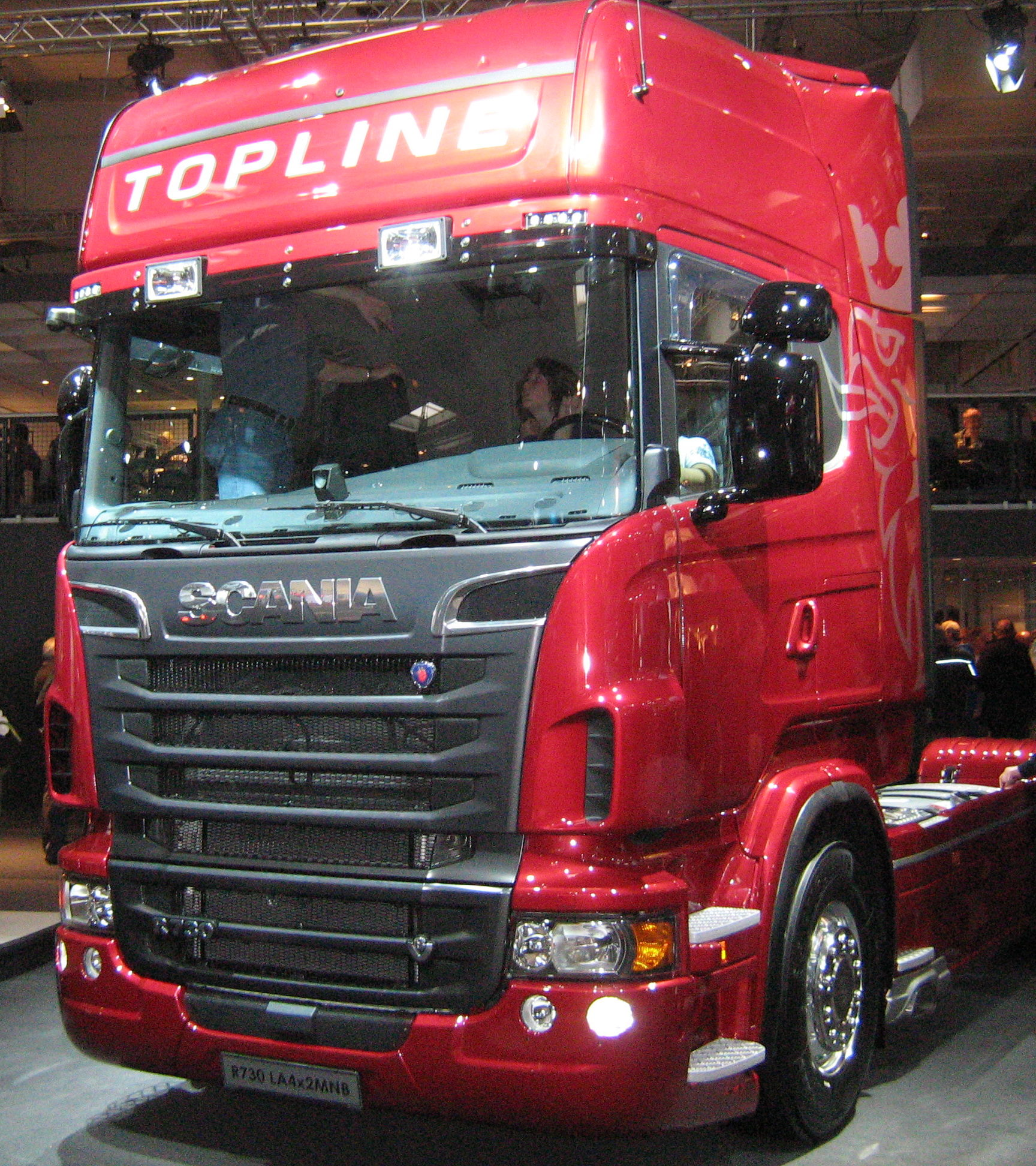
Scania R 730 LA4x2MNB with the 2009 facelift

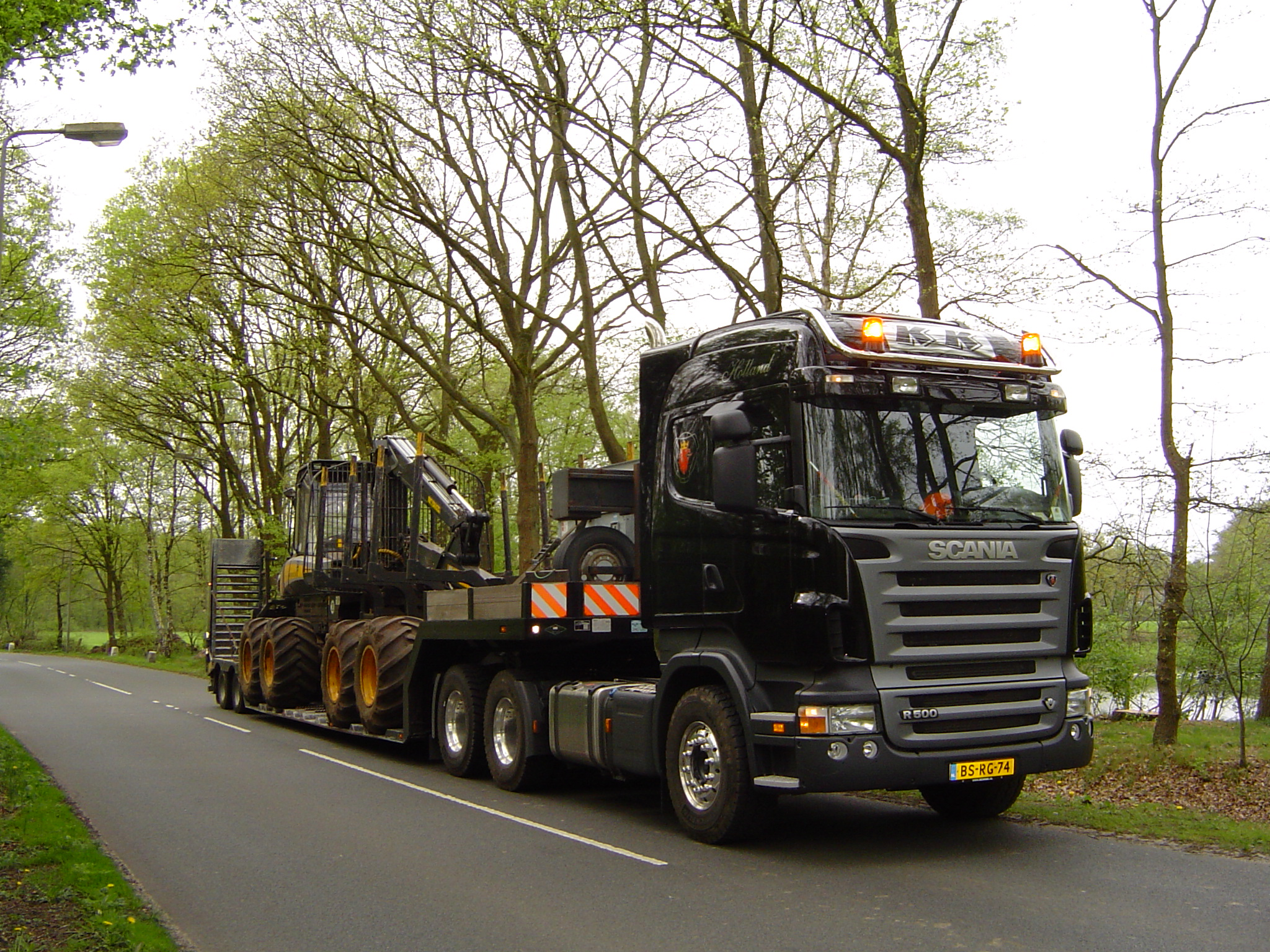
Scania R 500 LA6x2HHA tractor unit with original styling

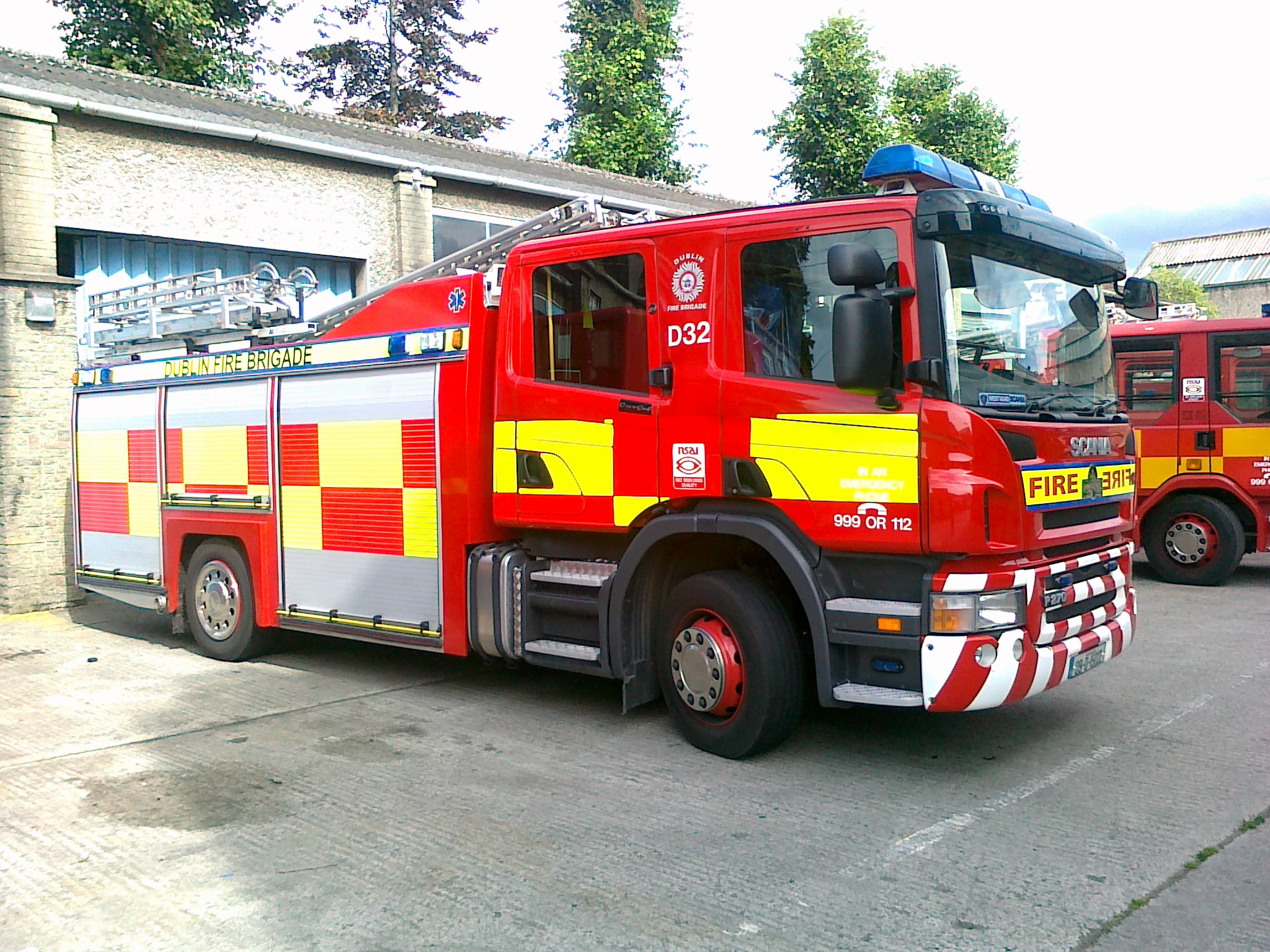
First generation Scania P 270 fire engine, Dublin Fire Brigade, Ireland

Scania develops, manufactures and sells trucks with a gross vehicle weight rating (GVWR) of more than 16 tonnes (Class 8), intended for long-distance haulage, regional and local distribution of goods, and construction transport. The company offers vehicles powered by conventional internal combustion engines, including diesel and alternative fuels, as well as hybrid and battery-electric powertrains. In 2025, Scania delivered 602 zero-emission vehicles globally.

The 1963 forward-control LB76 helped establish Scania-Vabis internationally and was among the first truck models to feature extensive crash-tested cab design.

==== Current range ====
All current Scania trucks are part of the PRT range, marketed as different series based primarily on cab height and application.

- L-series – Introduced in 2017, the L-series features a low-entry cab optimised for urban distribution, waste collection and other short-haul duties requiring enhanced driver visibility and accessibility.
- P-series – Introduced in 2004, the P-series is designed for regional distribution, construction and specialised transport operations. It is available with multiple cab configurations, including day cab, sleeper cab and crew cab variants.

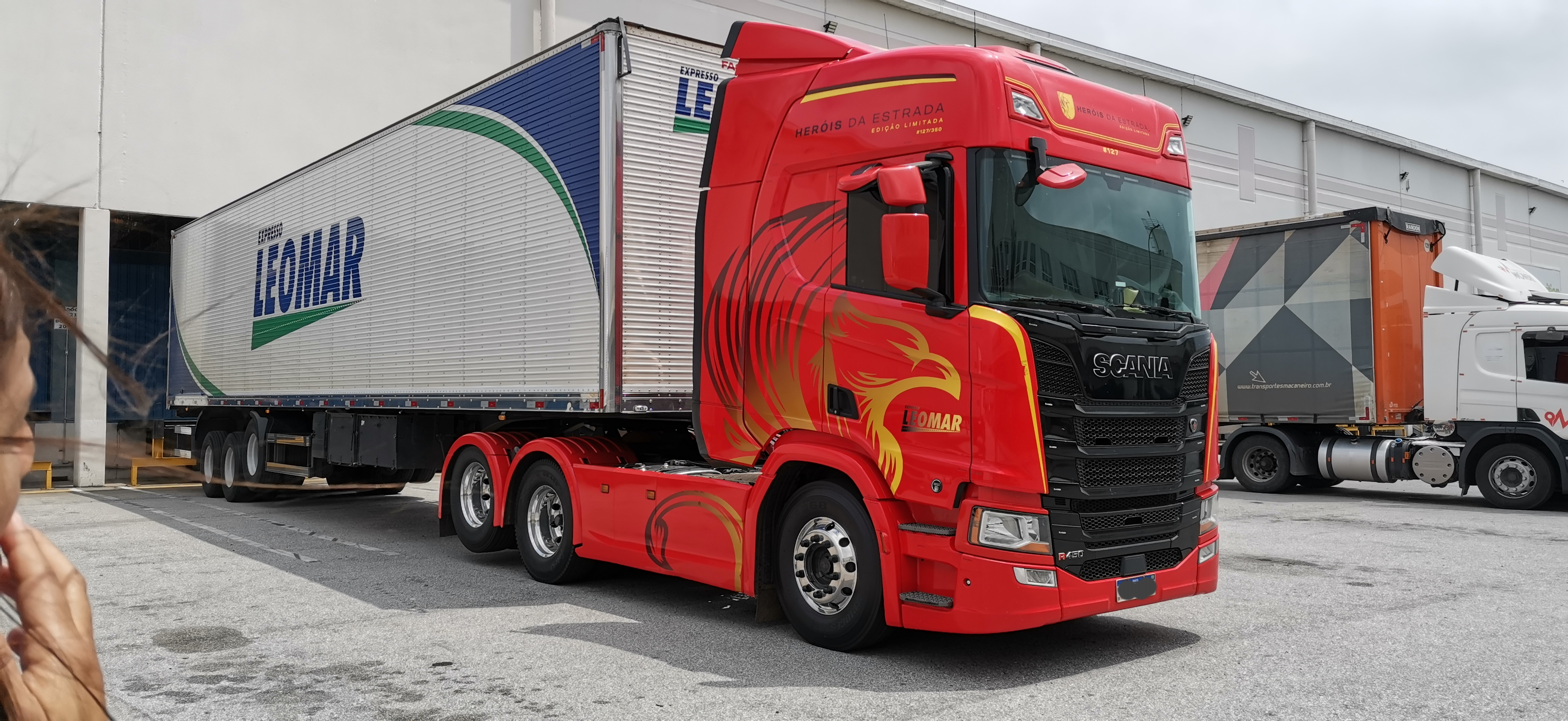
2021 Scania R450 "Heróis da estrada" special edition

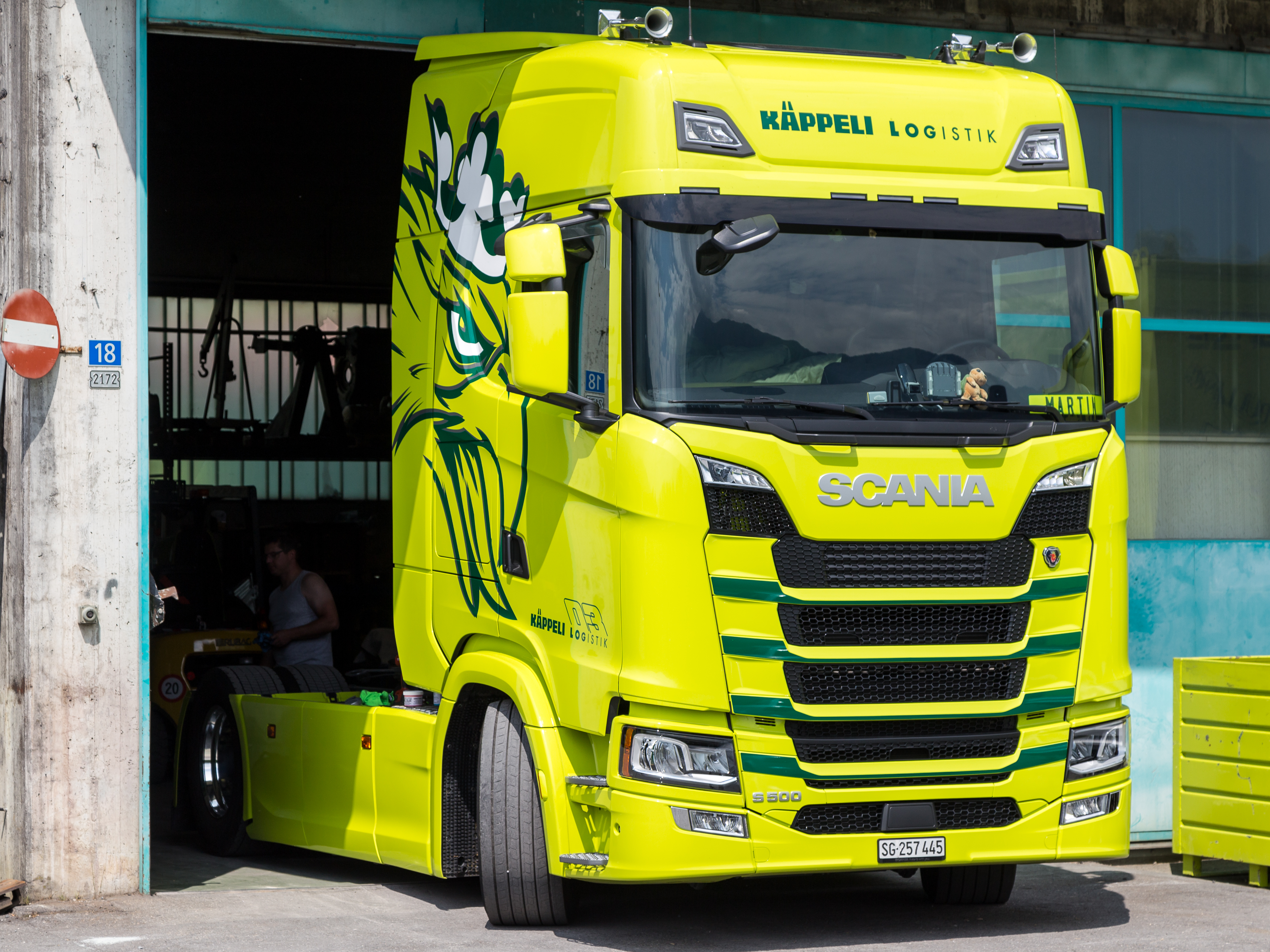
Scania S500

- G-series – Introduced in 2007, the G-series targets national long-haul and construction applications. It is offered with several sleeper and day cab configurations and a range of chassis and axle options.
- R-series – Introduced in 2004, the R-series is primarily intended for long-haul operations and has received multiple International Truck of the Year awards, including in 2005 and 2010. The R 730 variant is powered by Scania’s 16.4-litre DC16 V8 engine producing 730 PS (540 kW; 720 hp) and 3,500 N⋅m (2,600 lb⋅ft) of torque.
- S-series – Introduced in 2016, the S-series features Scania’s highest cab configuration, with a flat floor design aimed at long-distance transport.
- Battery-electric trucks – Scania offers battery-electric variants within several series for urban, regional and selected long-haul applications.

In January 2026, Scania’s L-series cab, tested in an electric utility truck configuration, received a five-star safety rating from Euro NCAP in its Safer Trucks programme.

==== Historical ====
- CLb/CLc (1911–1927)
- DLa (1911–1926)
- ELa (1912–1926)
- FLa (1911–1924)
- GLa (1914–1923)
- 314/324/325 (1925–1936)
- 335/345/355 (1931–1944)
- L10/F10/L40/F40/L51 Drabant (1944–1959)
- L20/L60/L71 Regent (1946–1958)
- L75/L76/LB76 (1958–1968)
- L55/L56/L66 (1959–1968)
- L36 (1964–1968)
- 50, 80, 85, 110, 140 (1968–1974)
- 81, 86, 111, 141 (1974–1981)
- 2-series: 82, 92, 112, 142 (1980–1988)
- 3-series: 93, 113, 143 (1987–1997)
- 4-series: 94, 114, 124, 144, 164 (1995–2004)
- T-series (2004–2005)

=== Buses and coaches ===
Scania’s bus and coach operations have traditionally focused on the manufacture of chassis for a wide range of applications, from tourist coaches to urban and regional public transport. Since the 1950s, when the company operated under the name Scania-Vabis, it has also produced complete buses for its home markets in Sweden and other Scandinavian countries. From the 1990s onward, complete bus production expanded to additional European markets.

==== Chassis ====
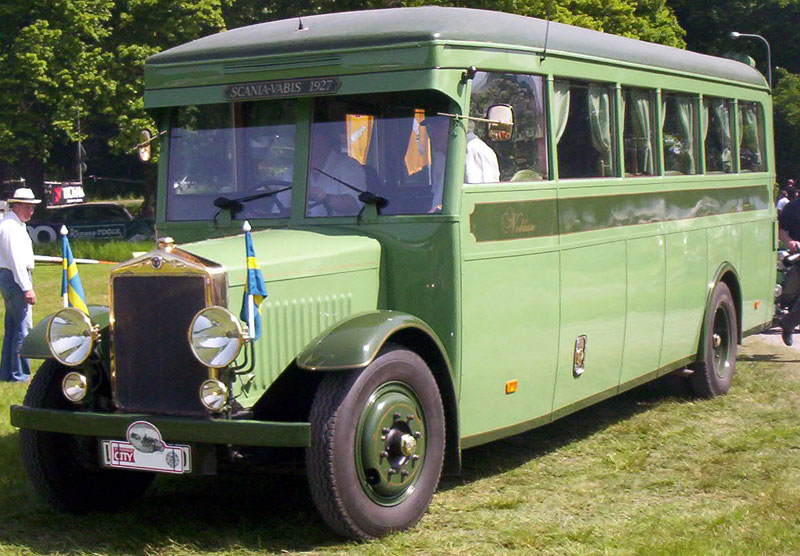
Scania-Vabis 3243 bus from 1927.

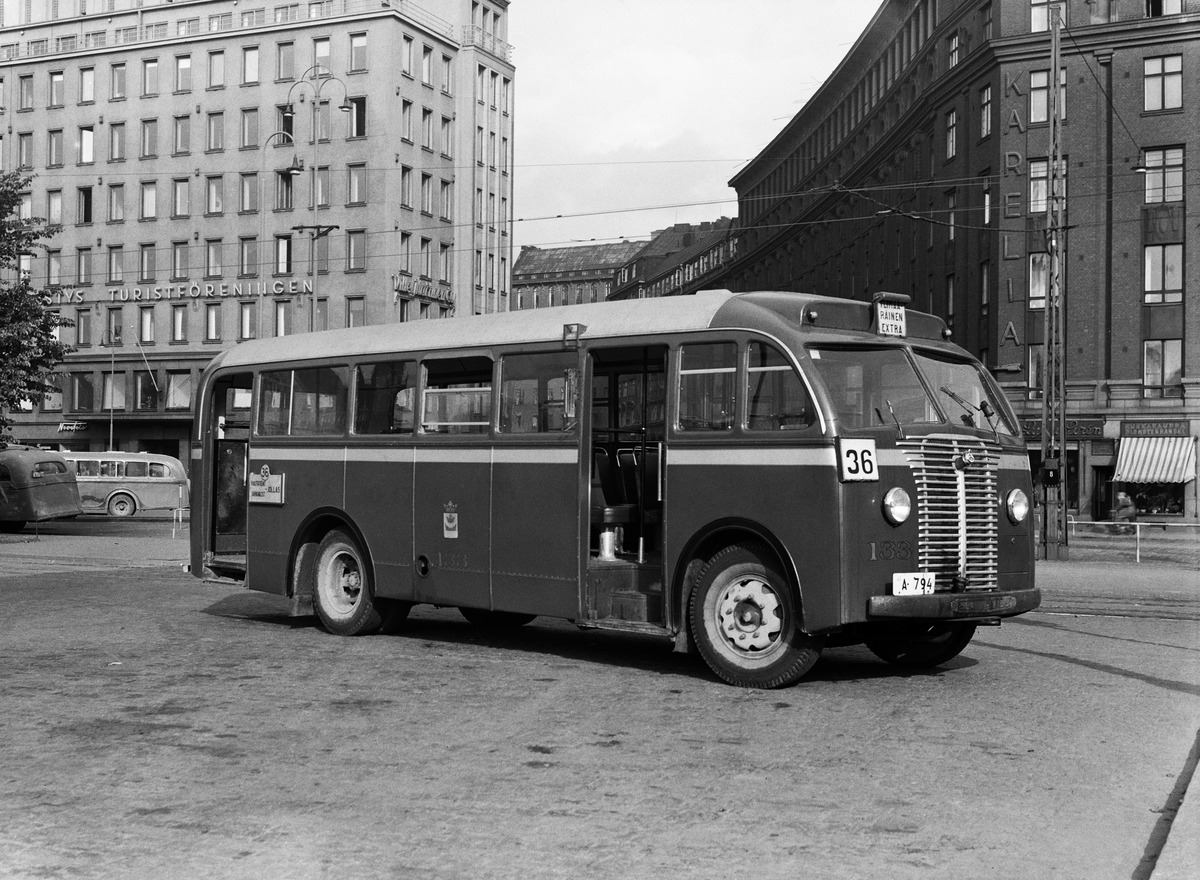
Scania-Vabis B15V bodied by Helko in Finland in 1949.

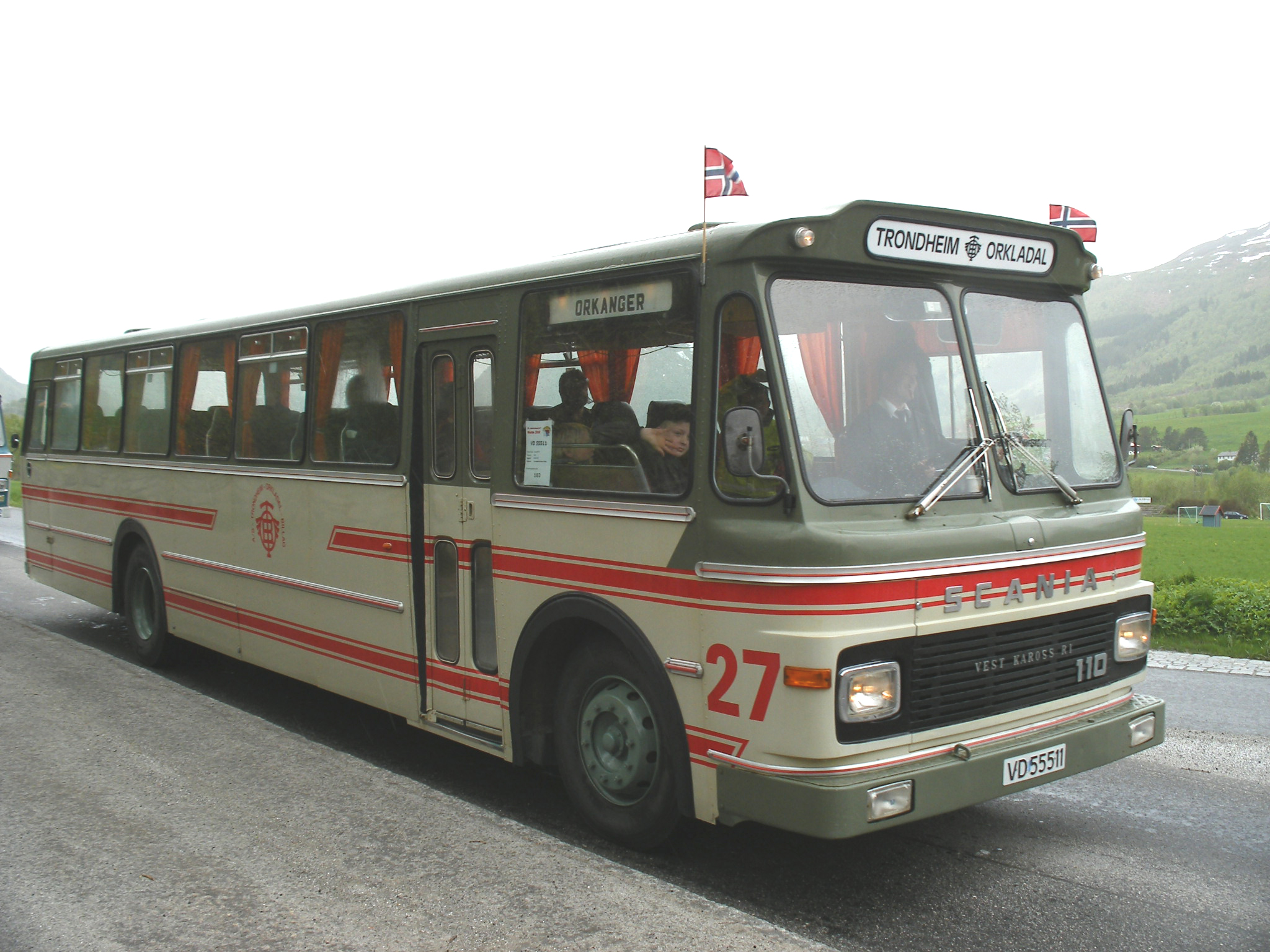
Preserved 1973 Vest Karosseri-bodied Scania B110 in Norway.

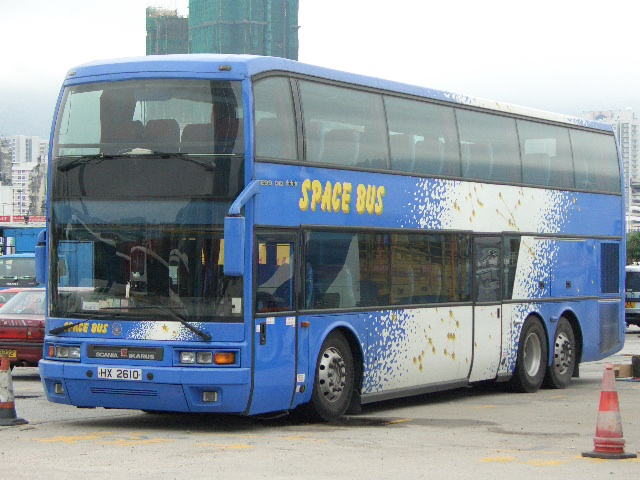
Ikarus E99 on Scania K124EB chassis in Hong Kong.

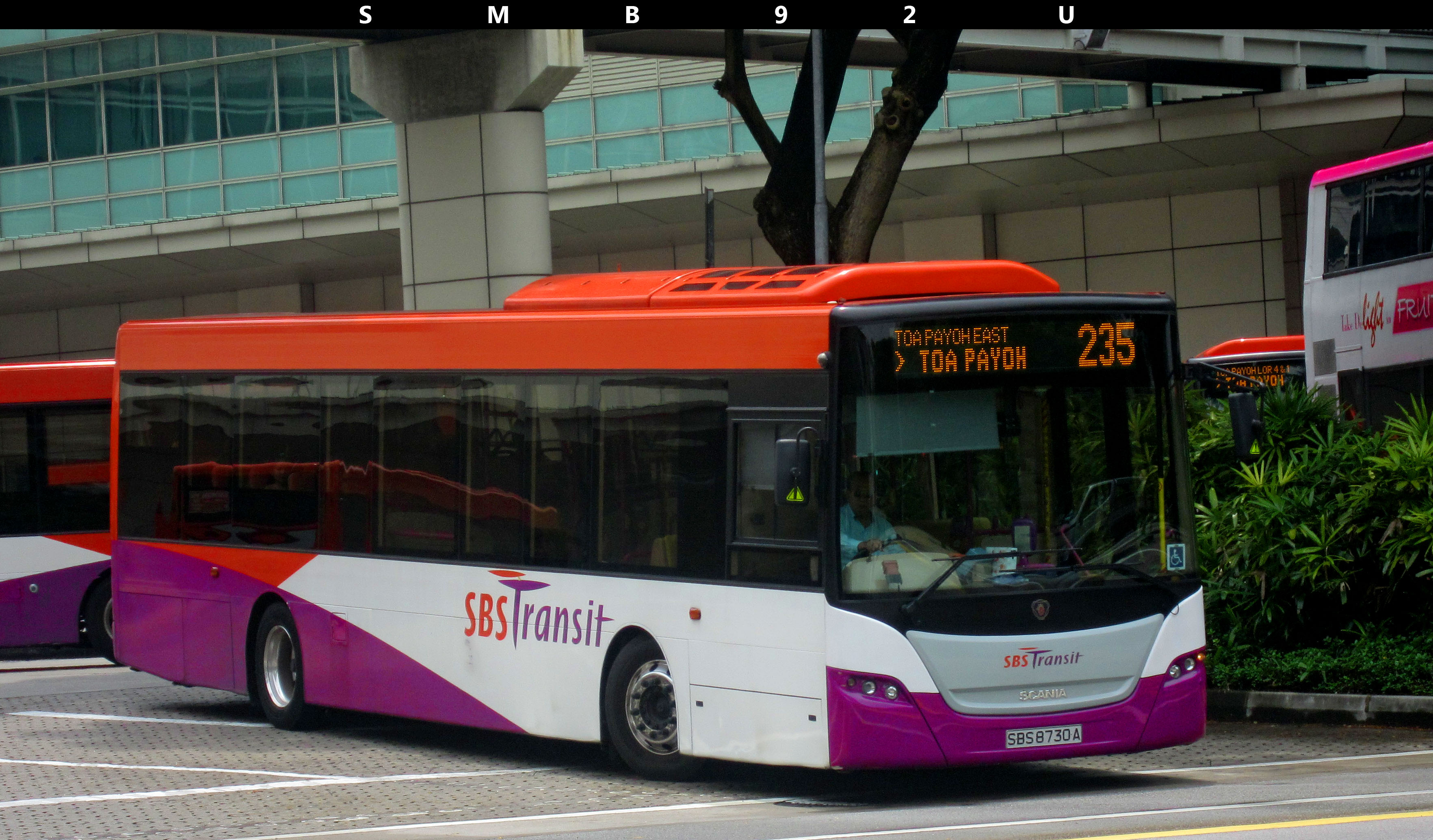
Scania K230UB bodied by Gemilang Coachworks, operated by SBS Transit in Singapore.

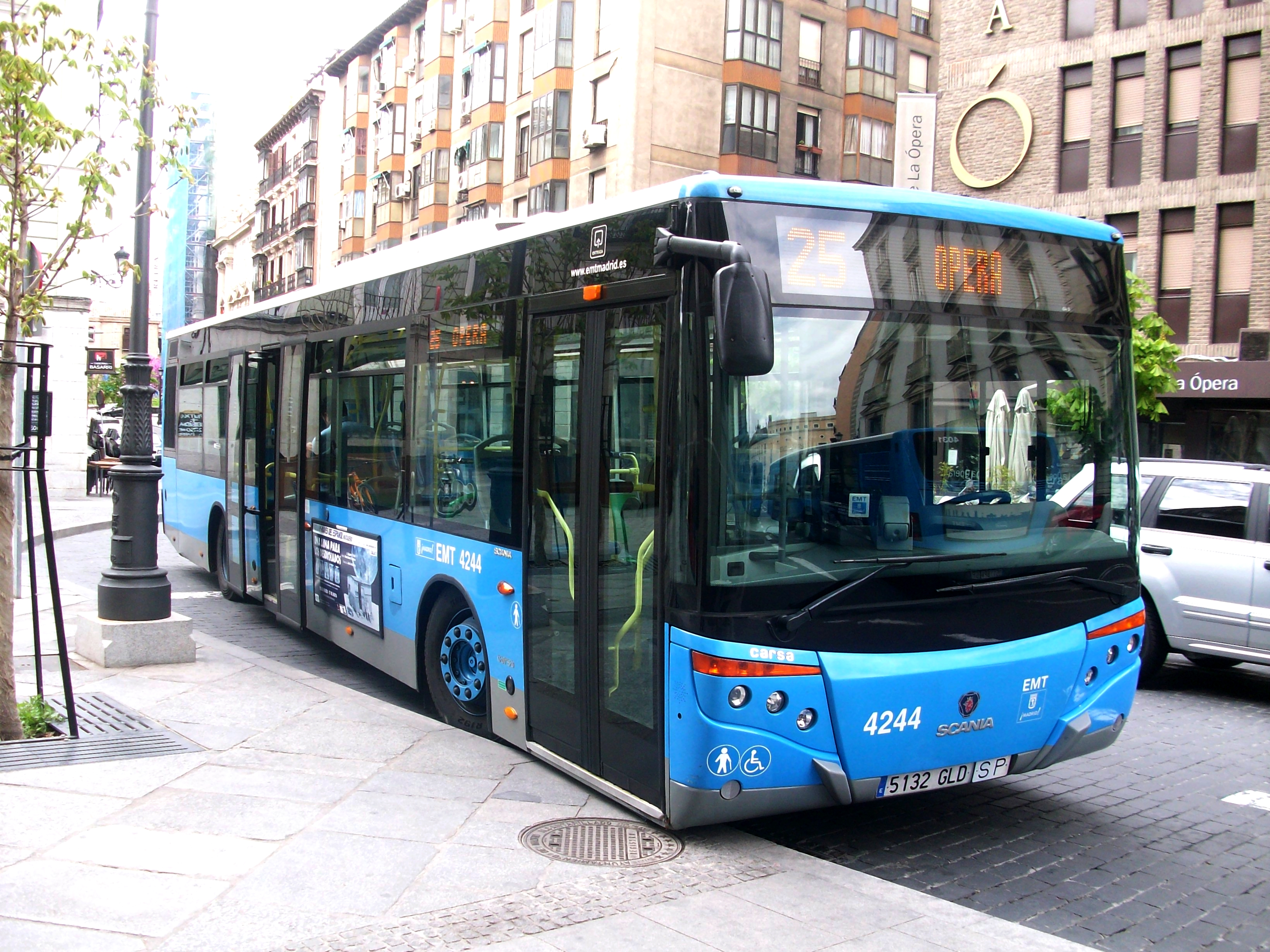
Scania N280UD, operated by EMT in Madrid, Spain.

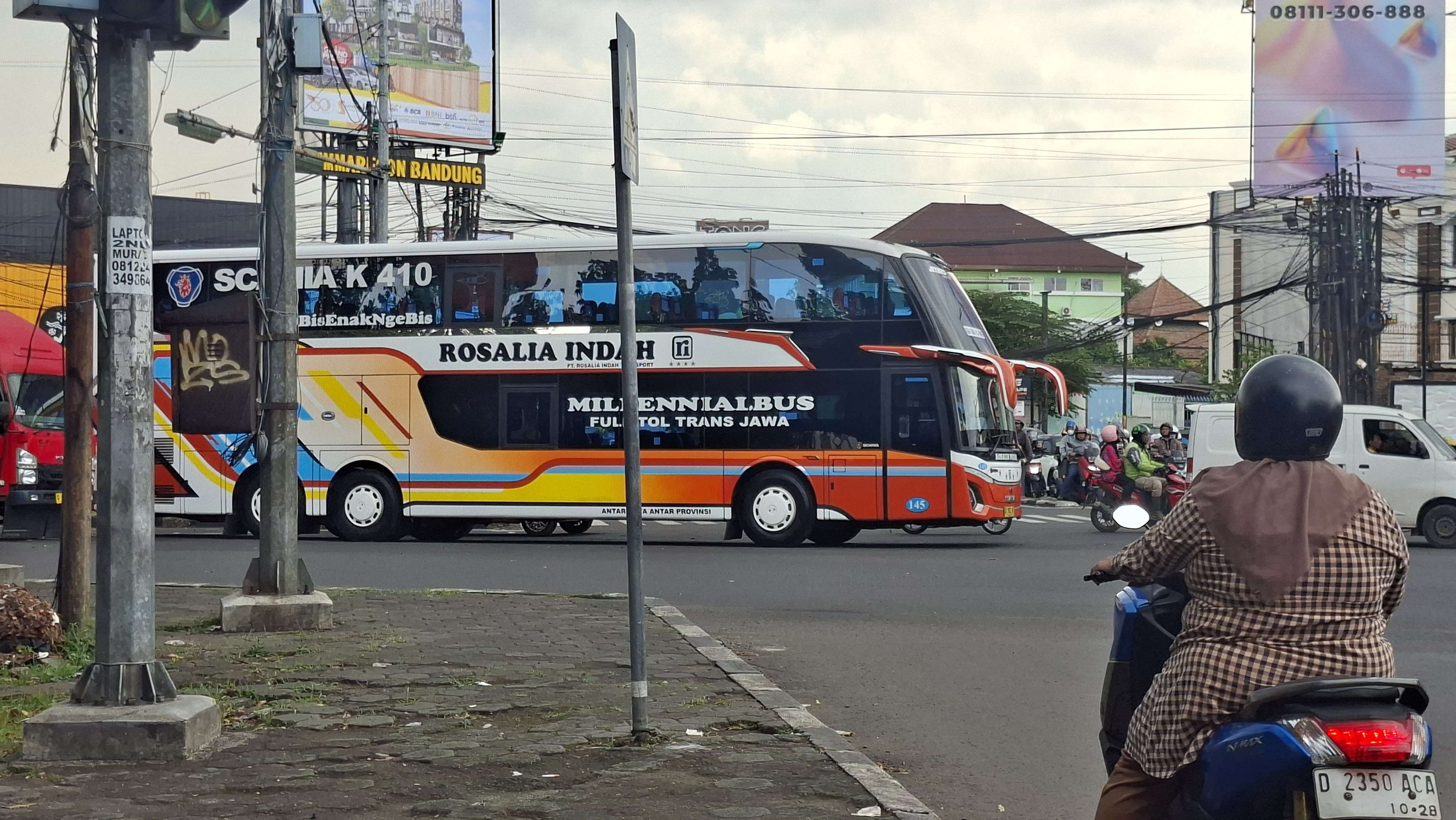
Jetbus 5 SDD bodied by Adiputro on Scania K410CB in Bandung, Indonesia.

Scania-Vabis was involved in bus production from its earliest years, producing mail buses in the 1920s.

In 1946, the company introduced the B-series of bus chassis, featuring an engine mounted above the front axle, which allowed a short front overhang and positioned the door behind the axle. The first generation included the B15/B16, B20/B21/B22 and B31 models, differentiated primarily by weight class and wheelbase. These were updated in 1948 as the 2B20/2B21/2B22 and 3B31. A trolleybus chassis, the T31/T32, was introduced in 1947.

A new generation followed in 1950 with the B41/B42, B61/B62/B63/B64 and later the B83. From this period, Scania-Vabis also offered the BF-series (BF61/BF62/BF63), which had the engine mounted ahead of the front axle, providing a longer front overhang and different door placement. Subsequent updates in the 1950s included the B51/B71 and BF71/BF73, followed by the B55/B65/B75 and BF75 in 1959, and later B56/B66/B76 and BF56/BF76 from 1963.

Shortly before the company adopted the Scania name in 1968, a limited number of CR76 chassis frameworks were delivered for external bodying, based on the complete CR76 bus. From 1968, this platform was marketed as the BR110. Other chassis models were renamed, with model numbers aligned to engine displacement, such as B80/B110 and BF80/BF110.

In 1971, Scania introduced a new range of longitudinal rear-engined chassis, including the BR85 and the V8-powered 14-litre BR145 aimed at the coach market. In Brazil, a variant known as the BR115 used the standard 11-litre engine. The BR111 replaced the BR110 and was derived from the CR111 complete bus. Model updates in the mid-1970s led to revised designations such as 86 and 111, with the BR145 later replaced by the BR116.

The BR112, launched in 1978, preceded the 2-series and replaced the BR111. The 2-series was introduced in 1981, with models including the F82/F112, S82/S112 and K82/K112. The BR112 evolved into the N112 in 1984, and a tri-axle version of the K112, designated K112T, was introduced. In 1985, the K82 and F82 were replaced by the 8.5-litre K92 and F92. Front-engined models were gradually discontinued in European markets during the mid-1980s, though production continued in Brazil.

The 3-series followed in 1988, retaining the general layout of the 2-series. In 1990, the L113 was introduced, featuring a longitudinal rear-mounted engine inclined at 60 degrees to reduce overall height. The 4-series was launched in 1997 as a modular platform, replacing the 8.5-litre engine with a 9-litre unit and the 11-litre with an 11.7-litre engine; a 10.6-litre engine was added in 2000.

Since 2006, Scania’s bus and coach chassis range has been marketed as the K-series, N-series and F-series, based on engine position. In addition to diesel powertrains, the range is available with hybrid and battery-electric drivetrains.

===== Current =====
The current bus and coach chassis range consists of the following series:

- K series – rear-engined (longitudinally mounted), available with diesel, hybrid and battery-electric powertrains.
- N series – rear-engined (transversely mounted), available with diesel, hybrid and battery-electric powertrains.
- F series – front-engined, available primarily with diesel and hybrid powertrains.

Battery-electric variants are offered primarily for urban and regional public transport applications.

===== Historical =====
- B55/B56/B65/B66/B75/B76/B80/B110
- BF56/BF75/BF76/BF80/BF110
- BR110
- BR85/BR115/BR145
- B86/B111
- BF86/BF111
- BR111
- BR86/BR116
- 2-series: BR112/N112, F82/F92/F112, K82/K92/K112, S82/S112
- 3-series: F93/F113, K93/K113, L113, N113, S113
- 4-series: F94, K94/K114/K124, L94, N94

==== Complete buses ====
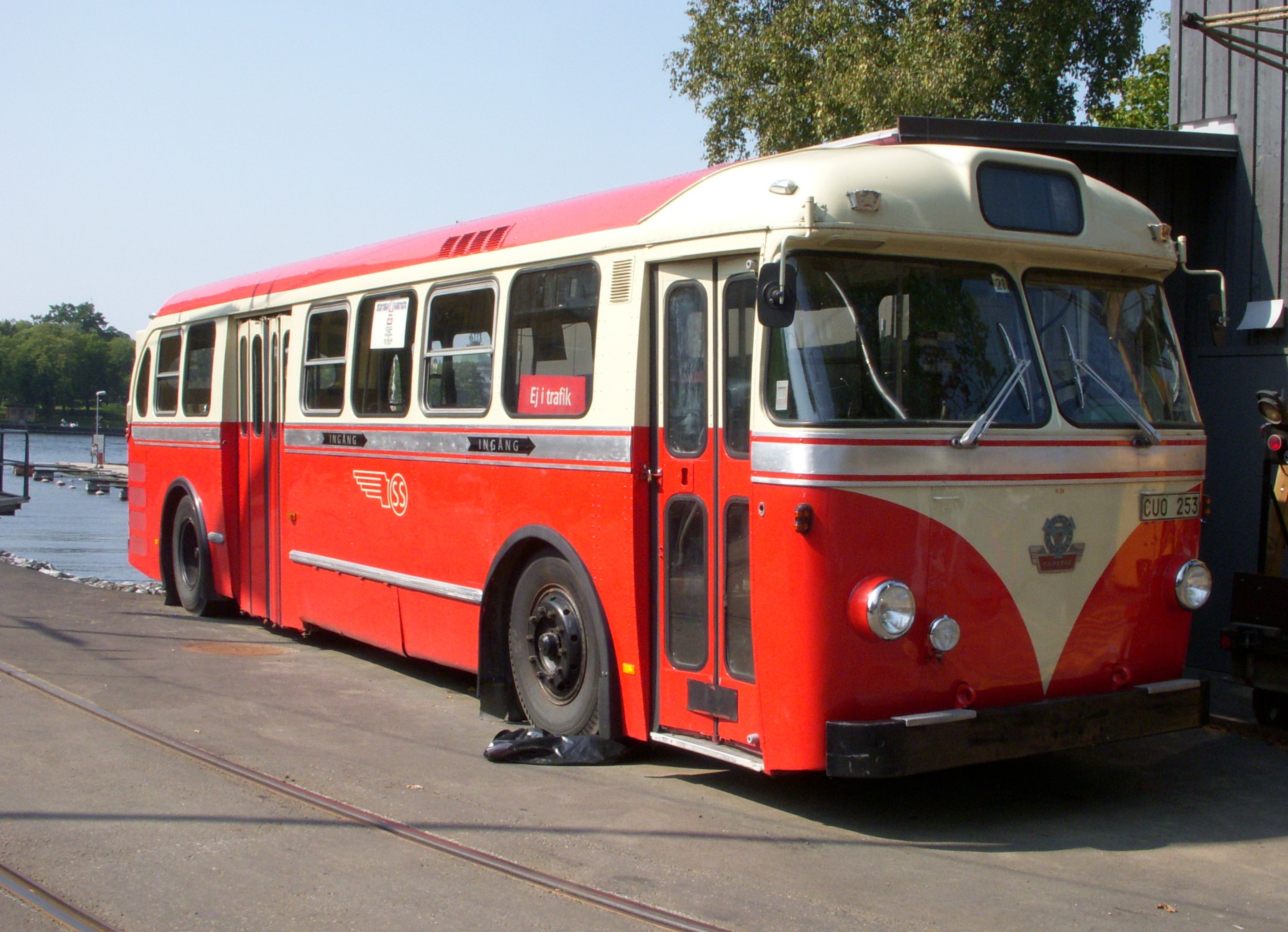
Scania-Vabis Capitol (C75) from 1962.

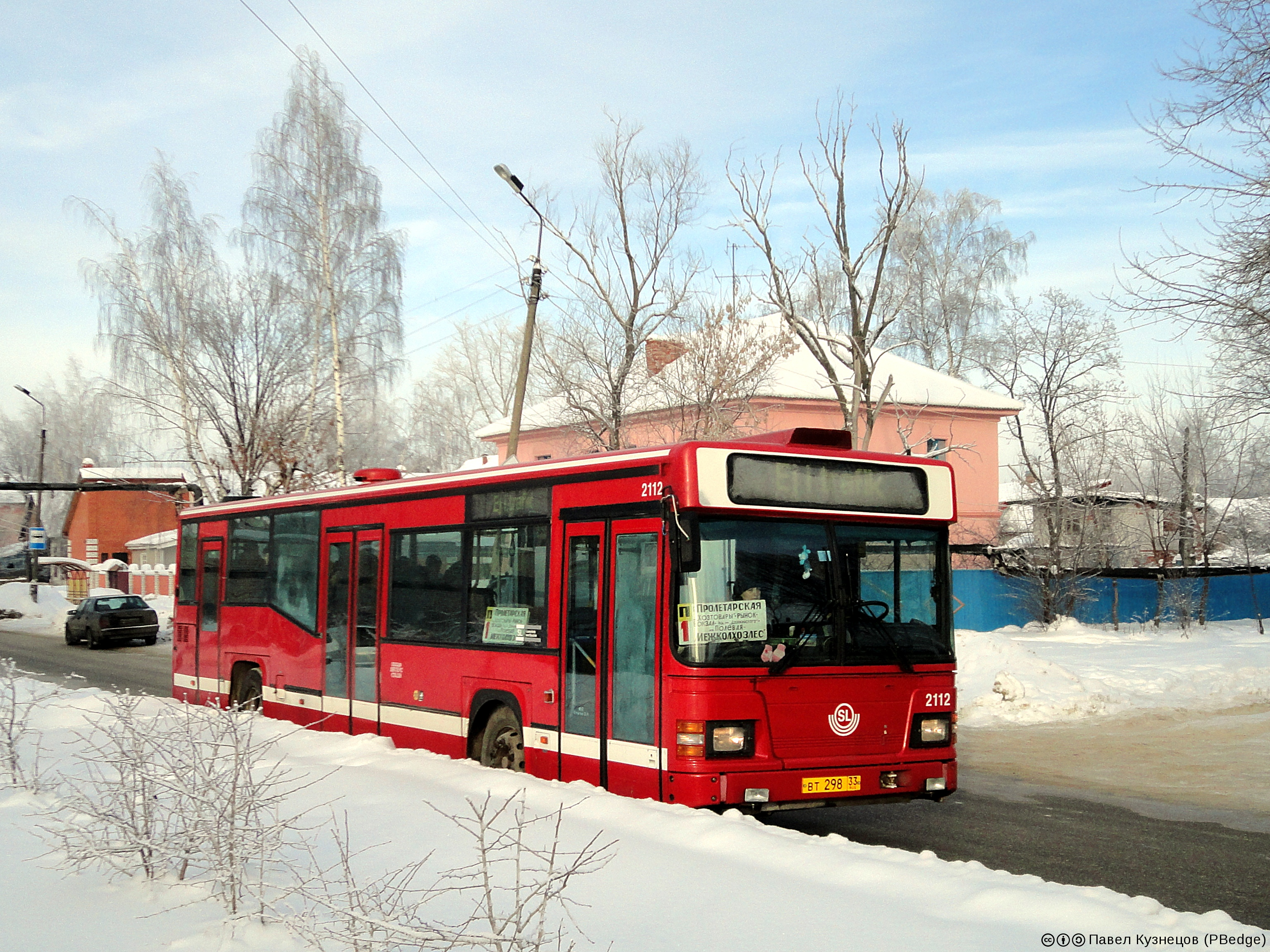
Scania MaxCi (CN113CLL) in Russia.

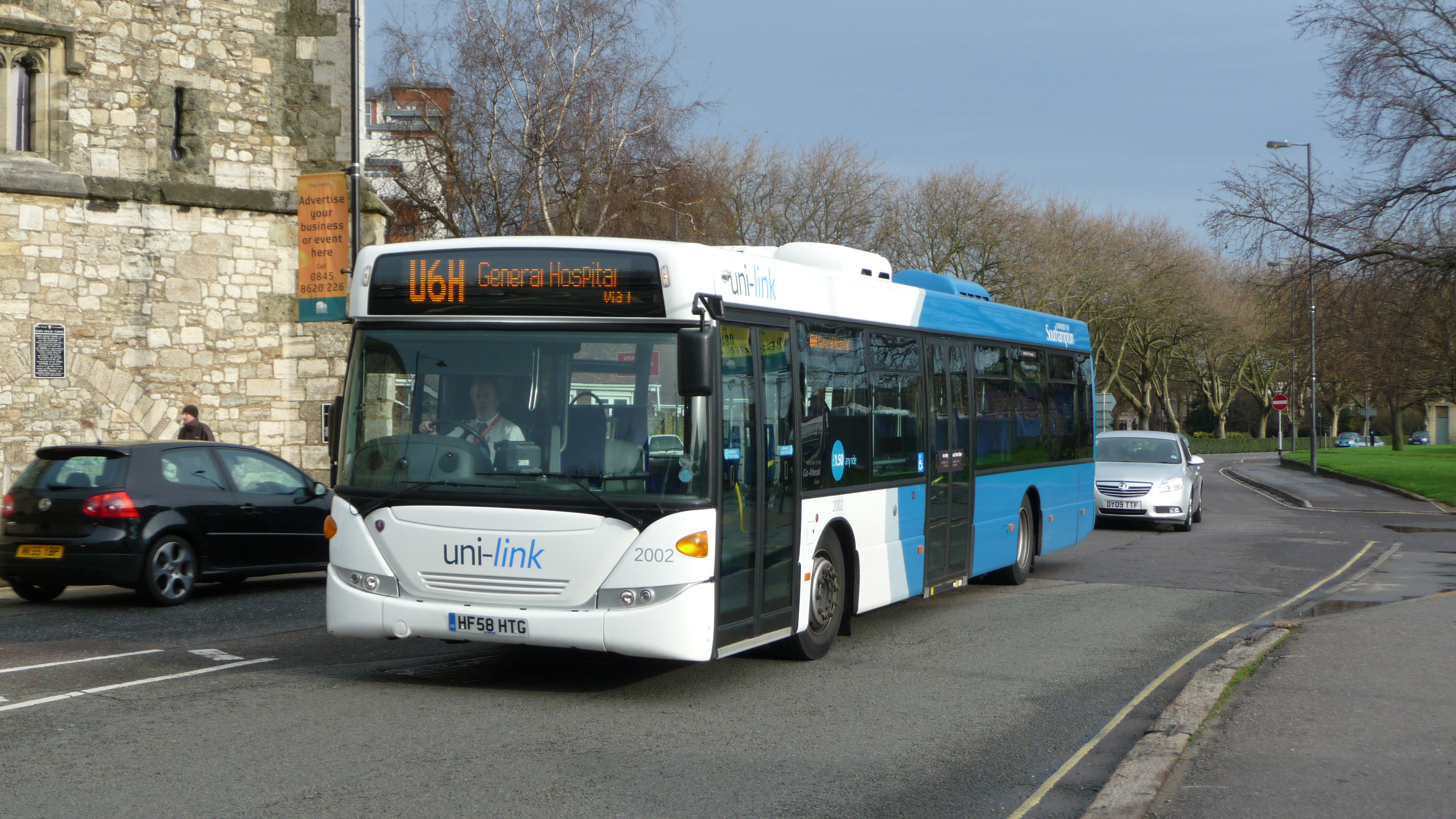
Bluestar Scania OmniCity in Southampton.

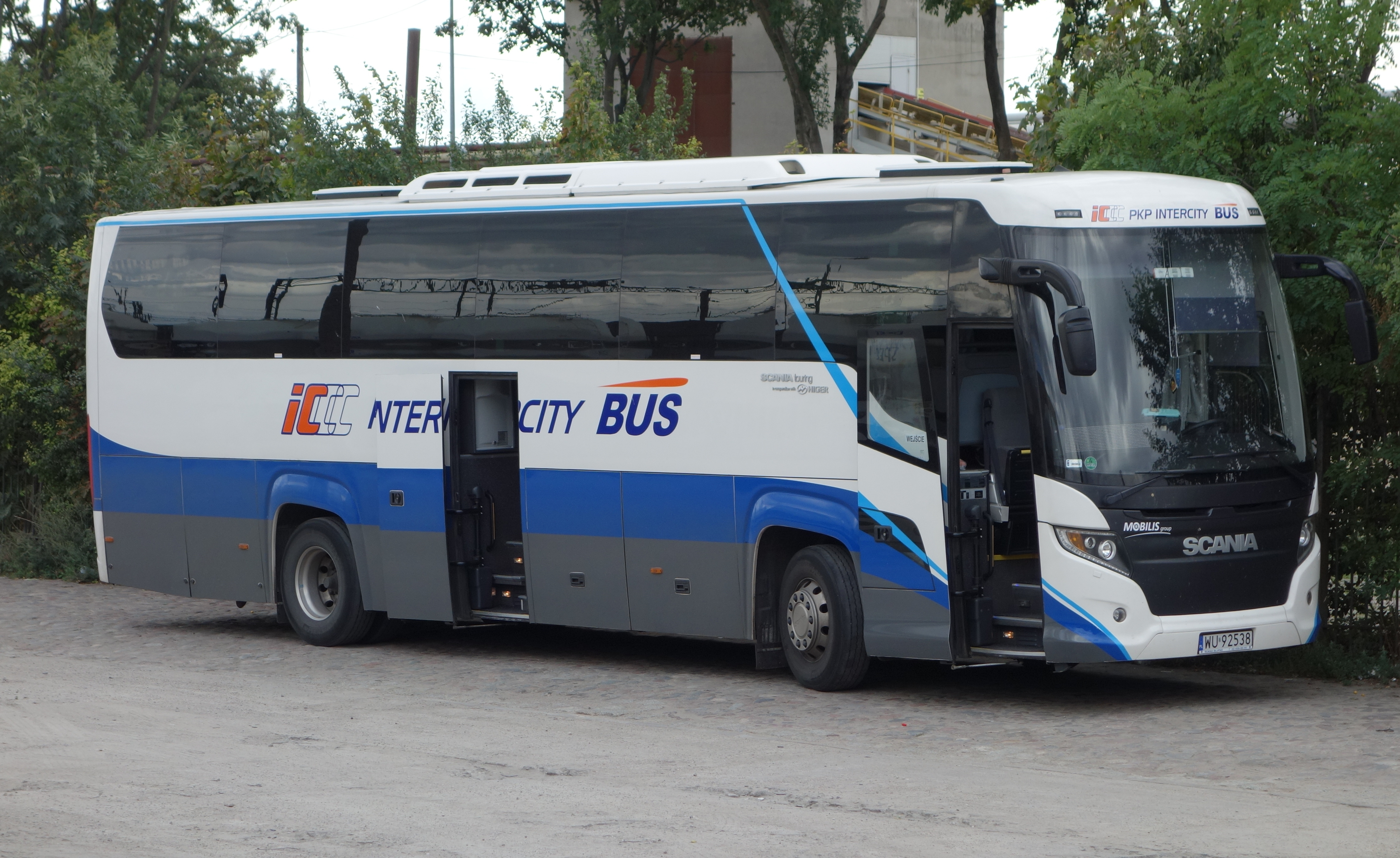
Scania Touring HD in Poland.

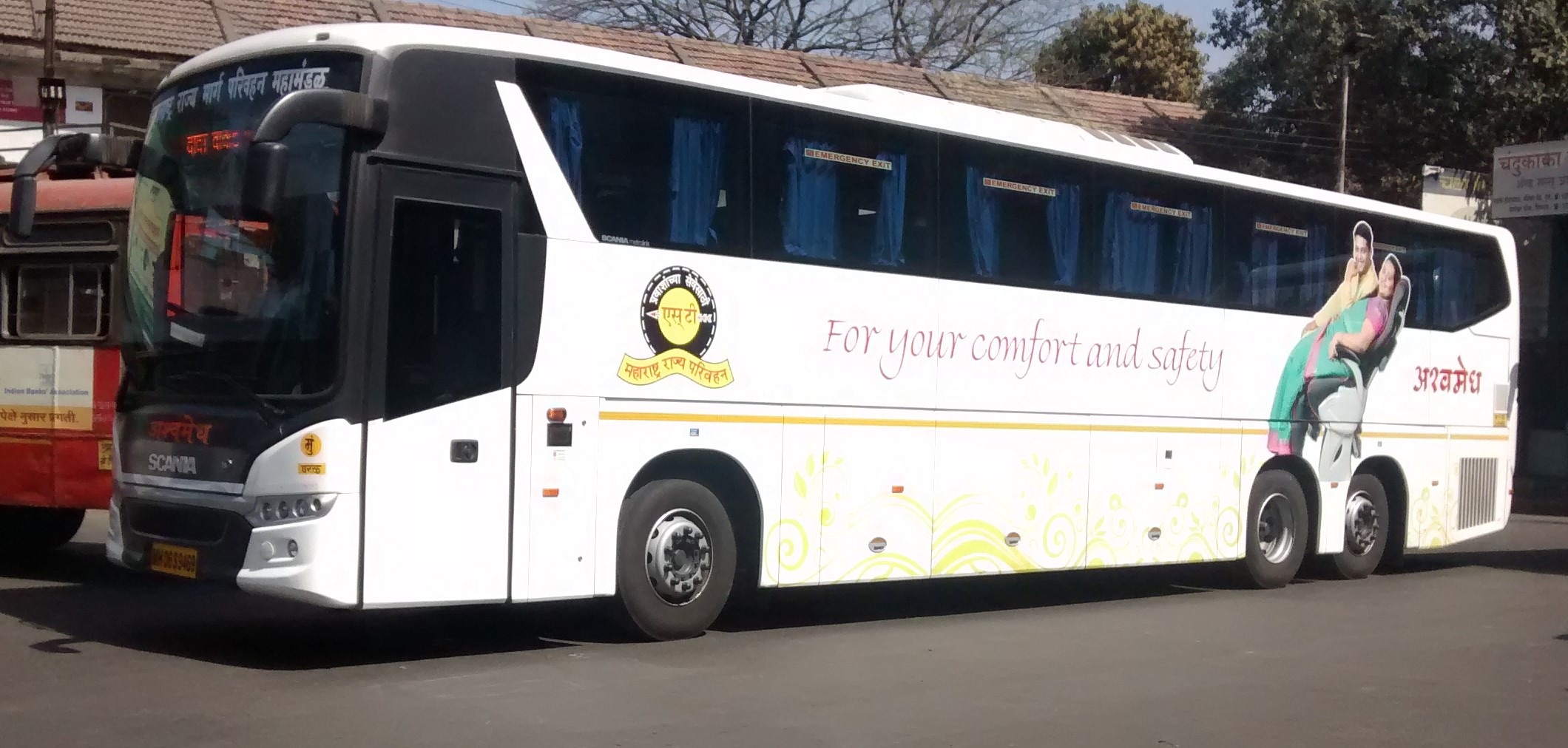
Scania Metrolink operated by MSRTC in India.

Scania-Vabis' first complete bus model was the transversely rear-engined Metropol (C50), built under licence from Mack in 1953–1954 for Stockholms Spårvägar. It was followed in 1955 by the shorter Capitol (C70/C75/C76), produced until 1964. In 1959, the front-engined CF-series (CF65/CF75, later CF66/CF76) was introduced and remained in production until 1966.

In 1965, the rear-engined CR76 replaced the Capitol. Following Sweden’s switch to right-hand traffic in 1967, demand increased for right-hand door configurations. After the company was renamed Scania in 1968, the model became the CR110. That same year, Scania acquired Svenska Karosseri Verkstäderna (SKV) in Katrineholm, consolidating bus body production.

During the 1970s, Scania introduced the CR111, followed by the CR85 and V8-powered CR145 coaches. The CR112, launched in 1978, introduced a more angular design and was later renamed CN112. North American variants were produced in limited numbers. Subsequent models included the CK112/CK113 and CL113, though production volumes remained relatively low.

The MaxCi (CN113CLL), introduced in 1992, was Scania’s first low-entry bus. In 1996, the aluminium-bodied OmniCity became the company’s first full low-floor bus, followed by the OmniLink in 1998 and the OmniLine in 2000.

Scania re-entered the complete coach market in 2007 with the OmniExpress. The Touring coach, introduced in 2009 and manufactured by Higer Bus in China, marked a new design language for the brand. In 2011, the Citywide replaced the OmniCity and OmniLink. In India, the Metrolink coach was launched in 2013. The Interlink followed in 2015 as a successor to the OmniExpress.

In 2021, Scania introduced the Fencer range, developed in cooperation with Higer Bus and initially launched for the UK market.

In 2023, Scania announced that it would discontinue in-house production of complete bus bodies and focus on chassis and drivetrain offerings in partnership with coachbuilders such as Higer, Irizar, Caetano and Carrocera Castrosua.

===== Current =====
- Fencer – low-floor urban, intercity and coach range, bodied by Higer Bus.
- Touring – coach model manufactured by Higer Bus.

===== Historical =====
- Metropol (C50) – rear-engined step-entrance commuter bus
- Capitol (C70/C75/C76) – rear-engined step-entrance city bus
- CF65/CF75/CF66/CF76 – front-engined step-entrance city and intercity bus
- CR76/CR110/CR111 – rear-engined step-entrance city and intercity bus
- C80/C110/CF110 – front-engined step-entrance city and intercity bus
- CR85/CR145 – rear-engined coach
- CR112/CN112/CN113 – rear-engined step-entrance city and intercity bus (rigid and articulated)
- CK112/CK113/CL113 – rear-engined intercity bus
- MaxCi (CN113CLL) – low-entry city bus
- OmniCity – low-floor city bus (rigid, articulated and double-decker)
- OmniExpress – coach and intercity bus range
- OmniLink – low-entry city bus (rigid and articulated)
- OmniLine – intercity bus
- Metrolink – intercity coach (India)
- Citywide – low-floor and low-entry city bus range
- Interlink – coach and intercity bus range

==== Buses through collaborations ====
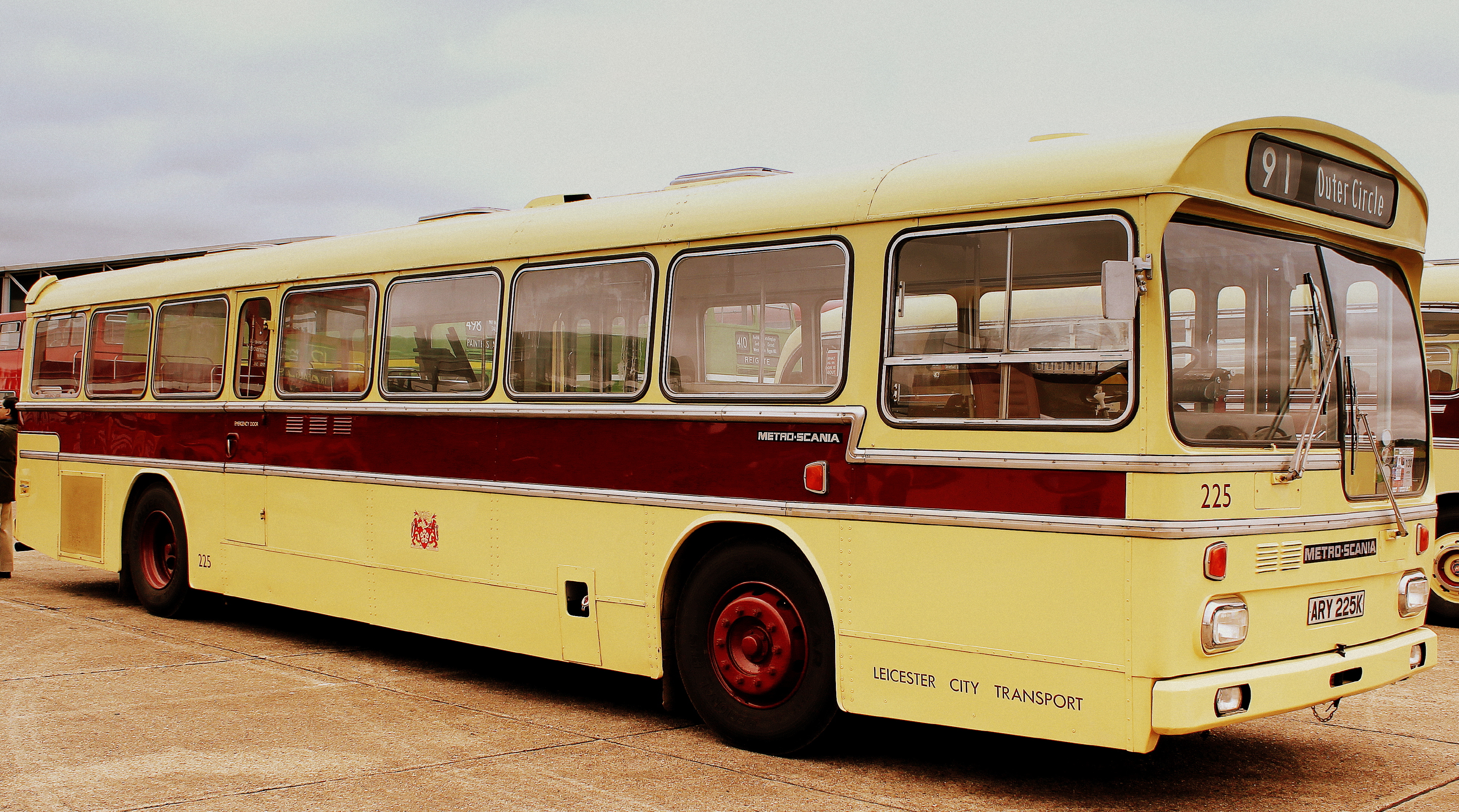
Preserved 1972 Metro-Scania at Showbus 2012.

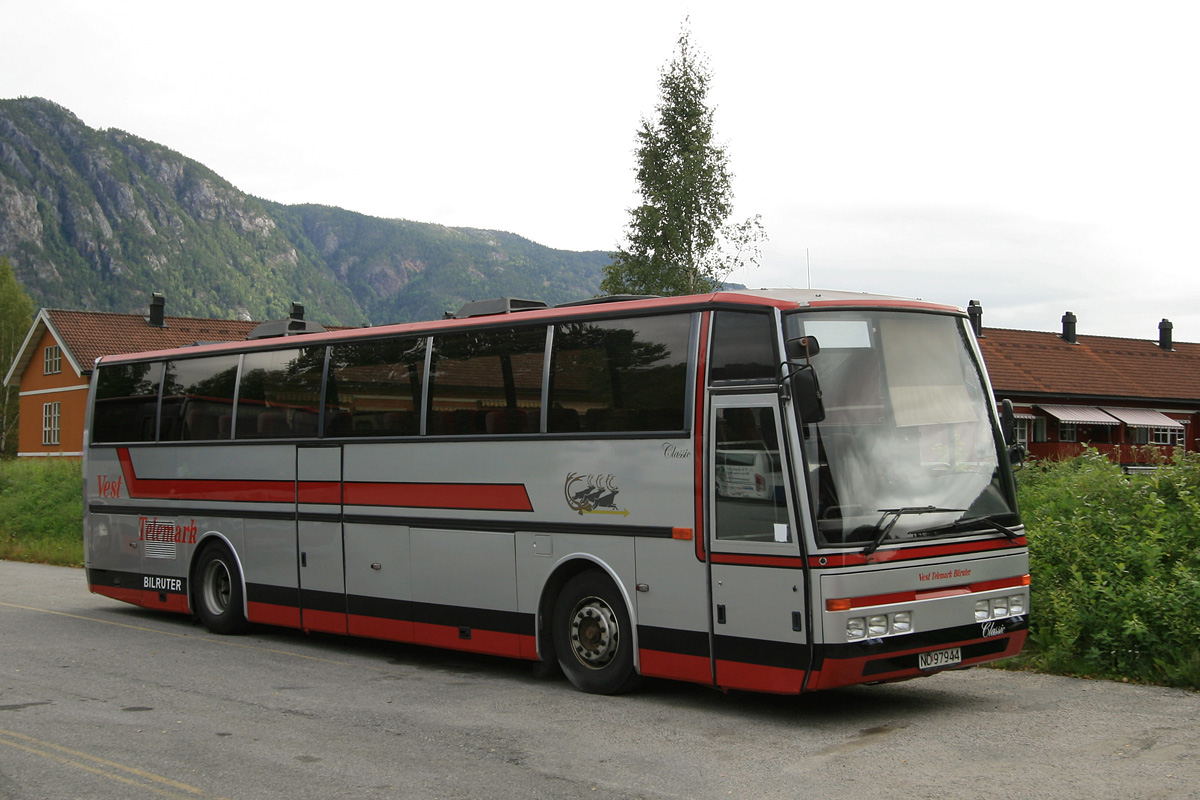
Preserved 1988 Scania Classic on K112 chassis in Norway.

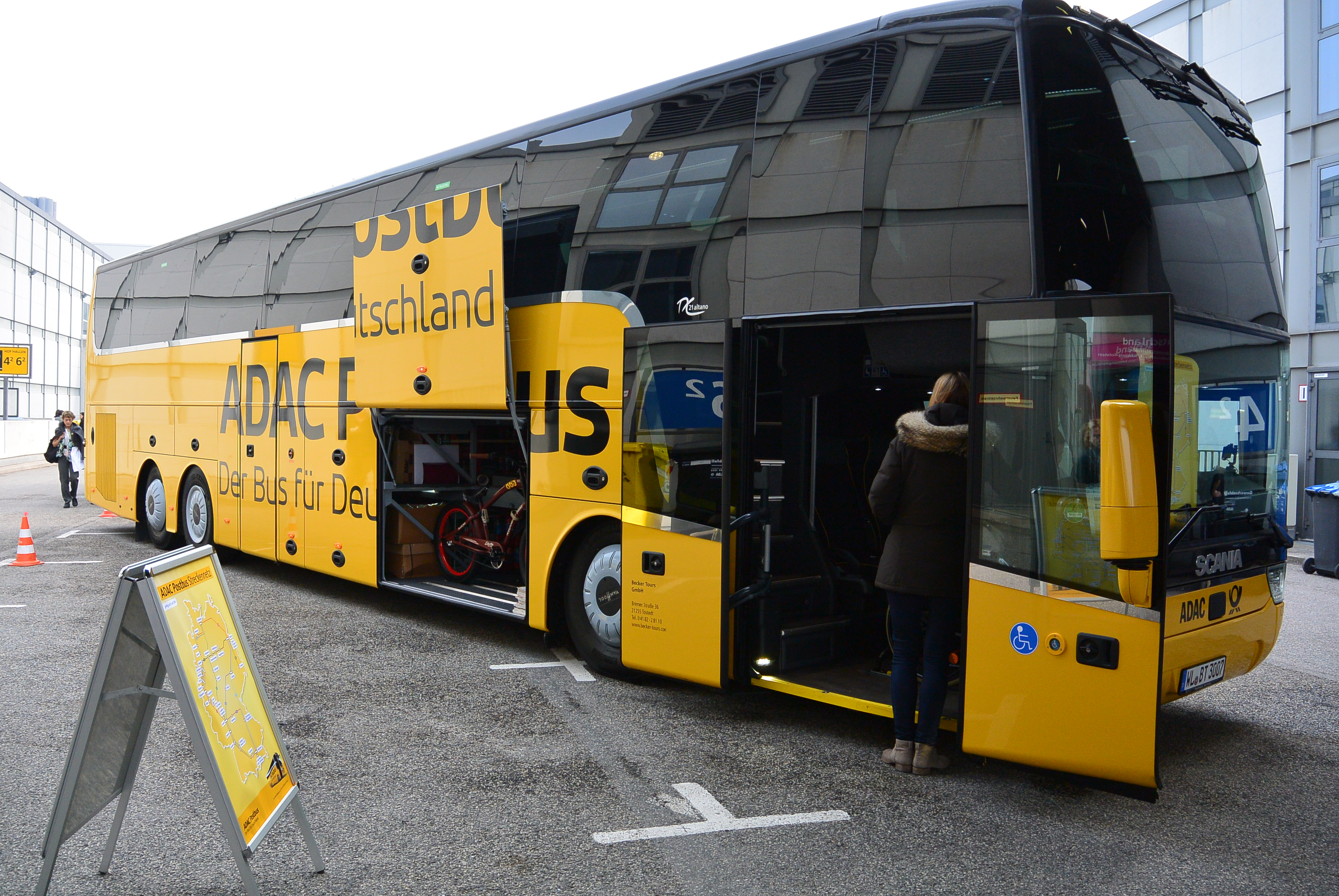
Van Hool TDX21 Altano on Scania K EB chassis in Germany.

In addition to supplying chassis for external bodybuilders and producing complete buses, Scania has collaborated with a number of body manufacturers to market vehicles through its distribution network, both globally and in specific regional markets.

=== Metro Cammell Weymann (UK) ===
In 1969, Scania partnered with MCW to produce the Metro-Scania single-decker for the UK market, based on the BR110MH and later the BR111MH chassis. In 1973, it was replaced by the Metropolitan double-decker built on the BR111DH chassis. Production ended in 1978 when the BR111 was replaced by the BR112.

East Lancashire Coachbuilders (ELC) introduced the MaxCi in 1993, based on the CN113 chassis, followed by the European on the L113 in 1995. In 2003, ELC launched the OmniDekka double-decker and OmniTown midibus using Scania chassis.

=== Irizar ===
From the mid-1990s, Scania entered a long-term cooperation with Spanish coachbuilder Irizar, distributing Irizar coaches through Scania’s network. For many years, Scania held exclusive distribution rights for Irizar coaches in Northern Europe. Key models included the Irizar Century and later the Irizar PB.

=== Norway – Ajokki / Carrus ===
In 1985, Scania’s Norwegian distributor collaborated with Finnish builder Ajokki to launch the Scania Classic, a coach built exclusively for Norway. Later generations were produced under Carrus after Ajokki’s restructuring. Production ended in the early 2000s following Volvo’s acquisition of Carrus. Additional Norway-exclusive models included the Scania Cruiser, Scania Universal and Scania InterClassic.

=== Higer Bus (China) ===
In 2006, Scania and Higer Bus announced the A80 coach built on Scania chassis in China. Variants from the Higer A series were marketed in Asia and Europe. The A80 later became known globally as the Scania Touring.

=== Van Hool ===
Since 2012, Scania has offered selected models from Belgian manufacturer Van Hool’s TX series on Scania K EB chassis, including the Astronef, Astromega and Altano. Since 2014, the Exqui.City BRT concept has been available on Scania N UA chassis, including compressed natural gas (CNG) variants.

=== Diesel engines and power solutions ===
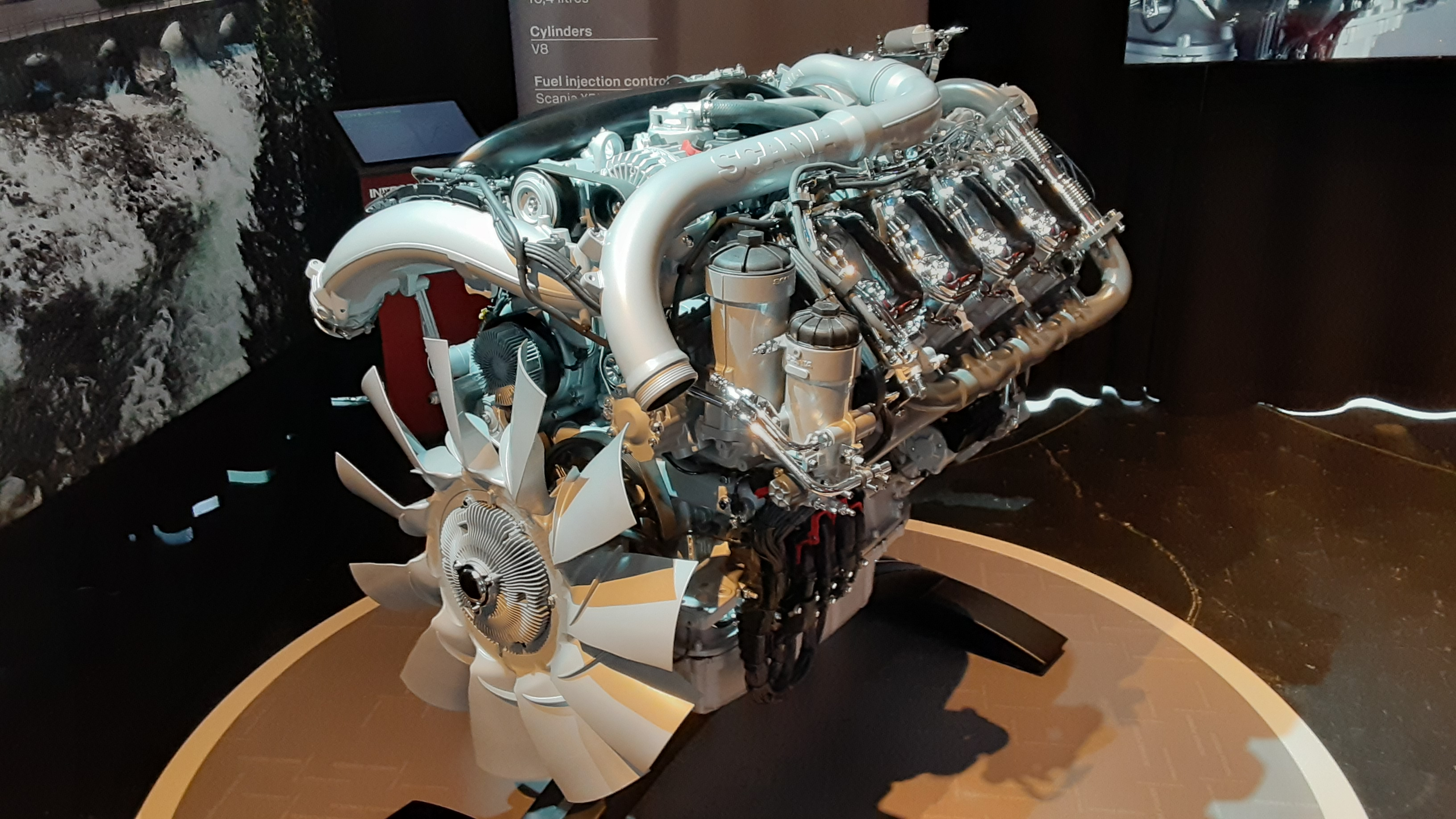
Scania 770hp V8

In addition to engines for buses and trucks, Scania produces industrial and marine power solutions used in construction, mining, material handling, agriculture, power generation and maritime applications. These offerings include internal combustion engines as well as hybrid and fully electric power systems, including industrial battery solutions for selected applications. Scania’s involvement in internal combustion engine development dates back to the late 19th century, when the company produced engines for early motor vehicles. Over time, Scania expanded its portfolio to include power units for trucks, buses, marine propulsion and industrial applications supplied to markets worldwide.

Years in parentheses indicate the first year of application in road vehicles.

==== Current ====
- DC07 I6 6,692 cc (2014-) – licensed Cummins ISB 6.7 engine for buses
- DC09/DI09 I5 9,291 cc (2007-)
- DC13/DI13 (Super 13) I6 12,742 cc (2007-)
- DC16/DI16 V8 16,353 cc (2010-)

==== Historical ====
- D10/DS10 I6 10,261 cc (1958)
- D7 I6 7,167 cc (1959)
- D8/DS8 I6 7,790 cc (1962)
- D11/DN11/DS11/DSC11/DSI11 I6 11,021 cc (1963)
- D5/DS5 I4 5,193 cc (1964)
- DI14/DS14/DSC14/DSI14 V8 14,188 cc (1969)
- DC9/DI9/DN9/DS9/DSC9 I6 8,476 cc (1984)
- DC9 I6 8,974 cc (1996)
- DH12/DI12/DSC12/DSI12/DT12 I6 11,705 cc (1996)
- DC11 I6 10,641 cc (1999)
- DC16 V8 15,607 cc (2000)
- DC9 I5 8,867 cc (2004)

=== Other products ===
Scania licenses branded merchandise such as clothing and scale models.

== Production sites ==
The table below lists current and former production facilities of Scania AB, including vehicle assembly plants and component manufacturing sites. As of 2025, Scania operates production facilities in Europe, South America and Asia, organised around a modular production system that enables shared components across different vehicle platforms. In October 2025, the company inaugurated a manufacturing hub in Rugao, China.

Notes: The second column of the table lists factory VIN ID codes, which are indicated in the 11th digit of a vehicle’s 17-digit Vehicle Identification Number. These codes are assigned only to plants producing complete vehicles; component and sub-assembly factories do not have VIN ID codes.

Factory name	Factory VIN ID code(s)	Factory WMI code(s)	Location (continent, country)	Location (town/city, state/region)	Current motor vehicle production	Former motor vehicle production	Automotive products & components	Year opened	Comments	Factory coordinates
Angers	9	VLU	Europe, France	Angers, Maine- et-Loire, Pays de la Loire	Scania truck assembly			1992	Scania Production Angers S.A.S. factory and assembly line, part of Scania AB	47°30′4″N 0°30′55″W
Katrineholm		YS4	Europe, Sweden	Katrineholm Municipality, Södermanland County		Scania bus chassis and body assembly			Scania-Bussar AB, acquired by Scania-Vabis in 1967 (former Svenska Karosseri Verkstäderna)	58°59′42.7956″N 16°10′7.914″E
Lahti		YK900L	Europe, Finland	Lahti, Päijät-Häme	Scania bus body assembly			2007	SOE Busproduction Finland Oy, part of Scania AB since 2014 (former Lahden Autokori)	60°57′0″N 25°36′3″E
Luleå			Europe, Sweden	Luleå Municipality, Norrbotten, Norrbotten County			Scania truck frame members, Rear axle housings		Ferruform AB factory, part of Scania AB	65°36′48″N 22°7′45″E
Meppel			Europe, Netherlands	Meppel, Drenthe			Scania truck components and paint shop		Scania Production Meppel B.V. factory, part of Scania AB	52°41′25″N 6°10′24″E
Oskarshamn			Europe, Sweden	Oskarshamn Municipality, Kalmar County, Småland			Scania truck cab production		Scania AB factory	57°15′24″N 16°25′42″E
Rugao			Asia, China	Nantong, Jiangsu	Scania trucks			2025		
São; Bernardo do Campo	3	9BS	South America, Brazil	São Bernardo do Campo, Greater São Paulo, São Paulo state	Scania trucks Scania bus chassis		Engines, gearboxes, components, axles, truck cabs	1962	Scania Latin America Ltda., part of Scania AB	23°42′49″S 46°33′58″W
Słupsk		SZA	Europe, Poland	Słupsk, Pomeranian; Voivodeship	Scania bus body assembly			1993	Scania Production Slupsk S.A factory and assembly line, part of Scania AB	54°28′42″N 17°0′46″E
Södertälje	1; 2	YS2	Europe, Sweden	Södertälje, Södertälje Municipality, Södermanland, Stockholm County	Scania trucks Scania bus chassis		Components, Engines	1891	Scania AB headquarters, R&D and main production plant	59°10′14″N 17°38′26″E
Tucumán		8A3	South America, Argentina	San Miguel de Tucumán, Tucumán Province			Rear axle gears Gearboxes; Differentials; Drive shafts	1976	Scania Argentina S.A. factory, part of Scania AB	26°52′47.5″S 65°7′38″W
Zwolle	4; 5	XLE	Europe, Netherlands	Zwolle, Overijssel	Scania truck assembly			1964	Scania Production Zwolle B.V. factory, part of Scania AB	52°30′46″N 6°3′48″E

In 2015 Scania opened its first Asian Plant in Bangalore, Karnataka, India. This plant specialises in bus and coach making.

In November 2020, Scania acquired Chinese truck manufacturer Nantong Gaokai in Rugao, Jiangsu province, as part of its plans to establish vehicle production in China.

== See also ==
- Ainax – holding company created after an attempted acquisition of Scania by Volvo
- Marcus Wallenberg-hallen – Swedish vehicle museum, including Scania vehicles
- List of Volkswagen Group diesel engines – includes all current Scania engines
