= Ainax =

Ainax was a listed holding company that owned shares in the Swedish truck maker Scania. The company was a result of an attempted acquisition of Scania by Volvo that was blocked by the European Commission for competition reasons.

After Volvo was ordered to discontinue its ownership in Scania, the company's shares were placed in a separate holding company, which was then divested to the Volvo shareholders, and also traded on the NASDAQ OMX Group marketplace Nya Marknanden, today First North. In March 2006, Scania completed the acquisition of Ainax. Ainax was liquidated and Scania shares were distributed to Ainax's owners.

Ainax is a phonetic anagram of Scania (Ainacs).
