= Scania-Vabis L55 =

Scania-Vabis L55/L56/L66
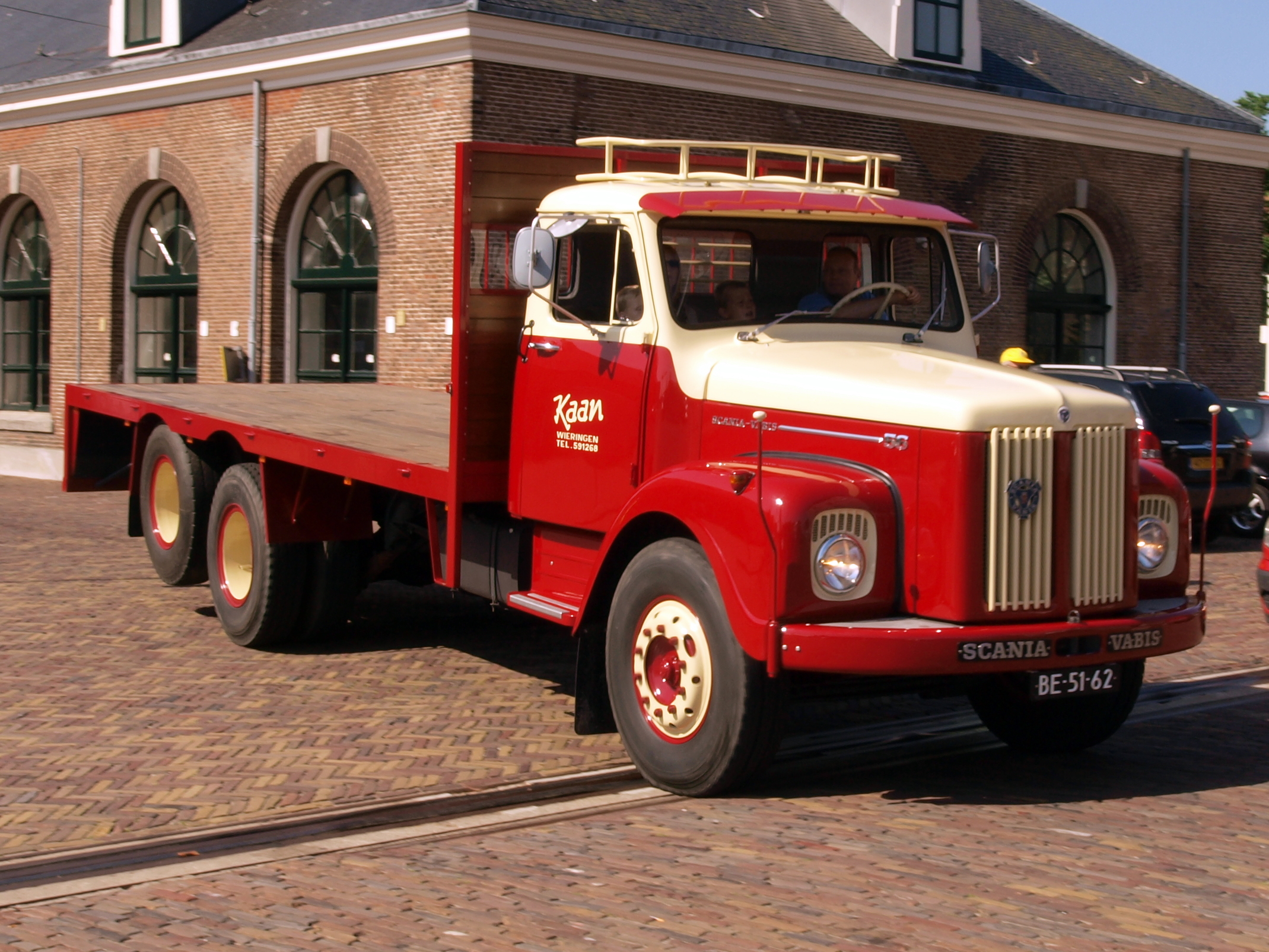

Overview
- Manufacturer: Scania-Vabis
- Production: 1959 - 1968, 18,416 produced

Body and chassis
- Class: Medium/heavy duty truck

Powertrain
- Engine: Scania-Vabis ohv I6 diesel engine
- Transmission: 5/10 speed manual

Dimensions
- Wheelbase: 3.4 m (133.9 in) - 5.4 m (212.6 in)
- Curb weight: 12,000 kg (26,455.5 lb) - 16,500 kg (36,376.3 lb) (gross weight)

Chronology
- Predecessor: Scania-Vabis Drabant
- Successor: Scania L80

The Scania-Vabis L55/L56/L66 was a series of trucks produced by Swedish automaker Scania-Vabis between 1959 and 1968.

== Scania-Vabis L55 ==
In the spring of 1958, Scania-Vabis introduced the L75 model. It was the first vehicle in a new generation of trucks, with newly designed six-cylinder engines, stronger chassis components and a new, more spacious and comfortable cab. The cab would be used for all conventional trucks until 1980. In the summer of 1959 Scania-Vabis presented the smaller L55, with a seven-litre engine. The truck was also offered with a trailing axle. This version was called the LS55, with an “S” for "support axle". All L55 series trucks came with air brakes, but power steering was still an option.

== Scania-Vabis L56 ==
In the autumn of 1962 the improved L56/LS56 series was introduced, with an eight-litre engine and dual circuits brakes.

== Scania-Vabis L66 ==
In the spring of 1963 Scania-Vabis introduced the L66 truck. This vehicle combined the strong chassis from the L76 series, built for heavy duty, with the smaller engine from the L56 series. The L66 was mainly intended for export, but was also sold on the domestic market.

== Engines ==
Model	Year	Engine	Displacement	Power	Type
L55	1959-62	Scania-Vabis D7: I6 ohv	7,167 cc (437.4 cu in)	120 bhp (89 kW)	Diesel engine
L56, L66	1962-68	Scania-Vabis D8: I6 ohv	7,790 cc (475 cu in)	140 bhp (104 kW)	Diesel engine

== Gallery ==
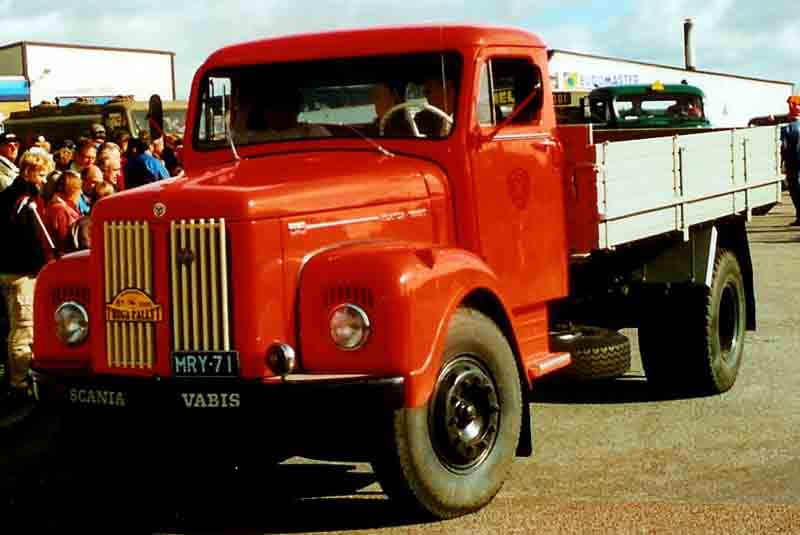
Scania-Vabis L55

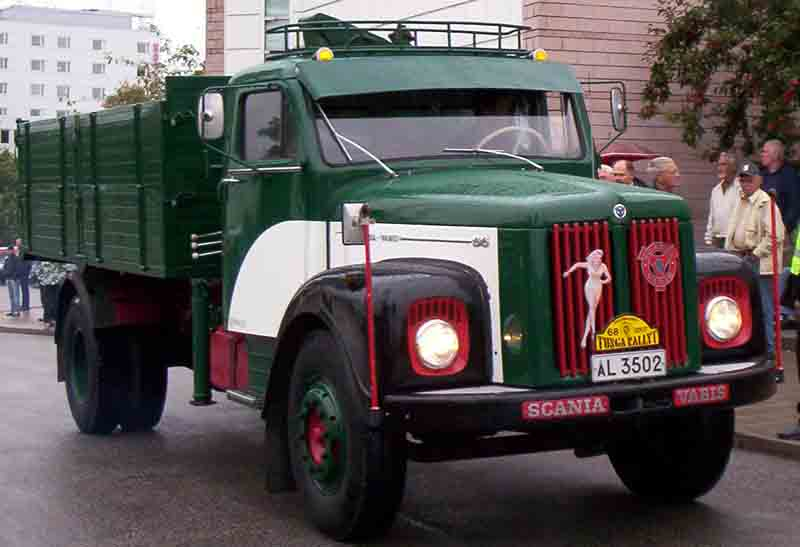
Scania-Vabis L56

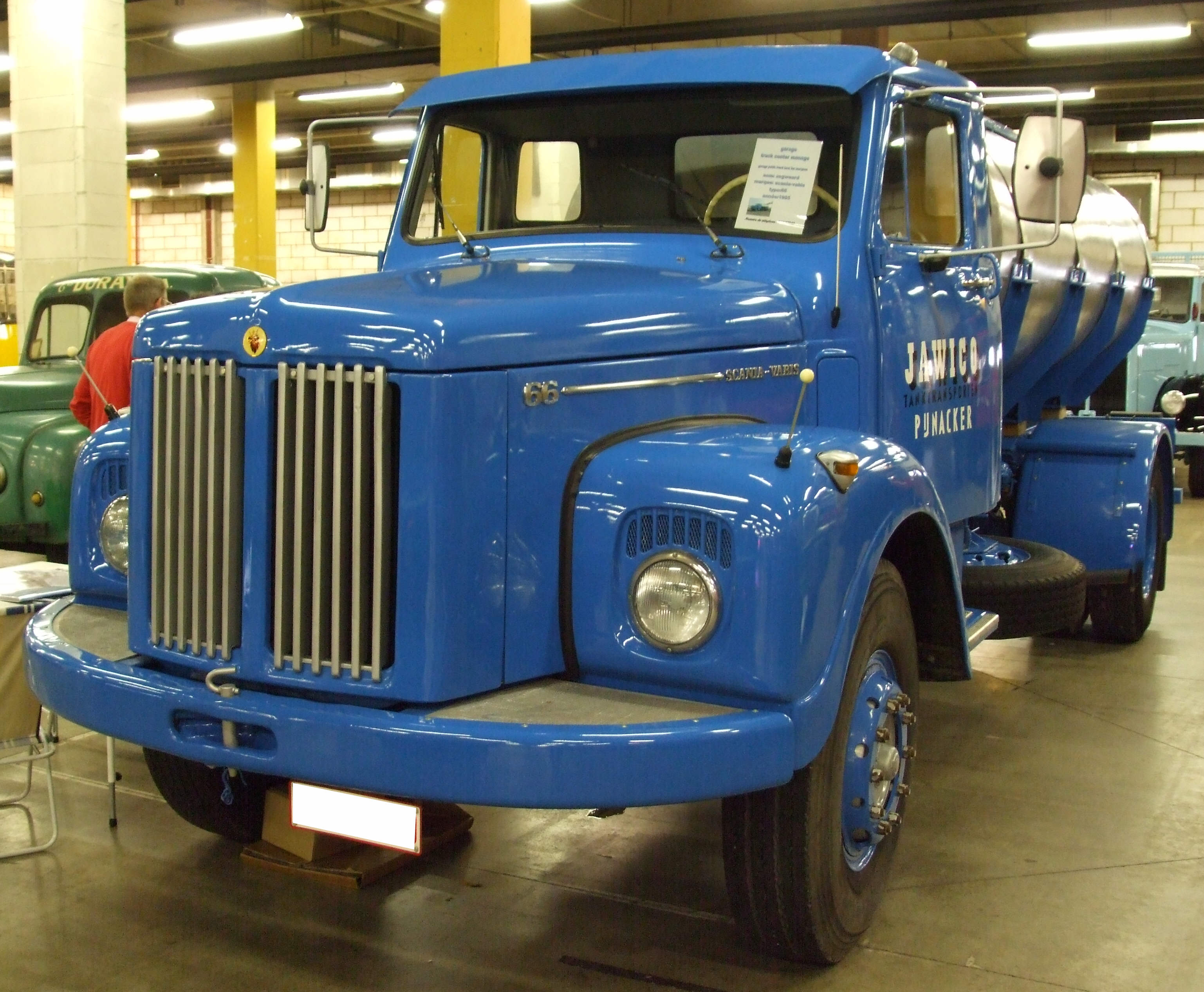
Scania-Vabis L66
