= Scania-Vabis L20 =

Scania-Vabis L20/L60/L71 Regent
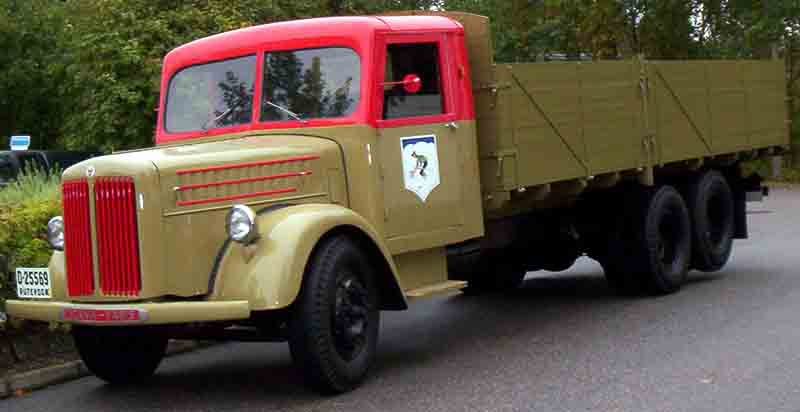

Overview
- Manufacturer: Scania-Vabis
- Production: 1946 - 1958, 14,329 produced

Body and chassis
- Class: Heavy duty truck

Powertrain
- Engine: Scania-Vabis ohv I6 diesel engine
- Transmission: 4/5 speed manual

Dimensions
- Wheelbase: 3.4 m (133.9 in) - 5.0 m (196.9 in)
- Curb weight: 10,000 kg (22,046.2 lb) - 18,000 kg (39,683.2 lb) (gross weight)

Chronology
- Predecessor: Scania-Vabis 335
- Successor: Scania-Vabis L75

The Scania-Vabis L20/L60/L71 was a series of heavy duty trucks produced by Swedish automaker Scania-Vabis between 1946 and 1958.

== Scania-Vabis L20 ==
Scania-Vabis’ first post-war model, the L10 had been introduced already in 1944. Two years later came the larger L20, with a six-cylinder variant of the company's module engine which had been introduced in the late 1930s. The truck was also offered with a trailing axle. This version was called the LS20, with an “S” for "support axle". The largest bogie vehicle had a payload capacity of 10.2 tonnes.

== Scania-Vabis L60 ==
At the end of 1949, Scania-Vabis introduced a direct injected diesel development of their module engine. It had been designed in collaboration with British truck manufacturer Leyland Motors. With the new engine, the six-cylinder truck's name was changed to L60 and LS60 respectively. Otherwise the truck was mostly unchanged. In 1951 the old fashioned non-synchro four-speed gear box was replaced by a synchronized five-speed transmission.

== Scania-Vabis L71 Regent ==
In the spring of 1954, the final development of Scania-Vabis’ six-cylinder module engines was introduced, with larger displacement. The trucks were renamed L71/LS71 Regent and received air brakes. From the autumn of 1955, they could also be ordered with power steering.

== Engines ==
Model	Year	Engine	Displacement	Power	Type
L20	1946-49	Scania-Vabis D604: I6 ohv	8,476 cc (517.2 cu in)	135 bhp (101 kW)	Pre-chamber diesel
L60	1949-54	Scania-Vabis D622: I6 ohv	8,476 cc (517.2 cu in)	135 bhp (101 kW)	Direct injection diesel
L71 Regent	1954-58	Scania-Vabis D642: I6 ohv	9,348 cc (570.4 cu in)	150 bhp (112 kW)	Direct injection diesel

== Gallery ==
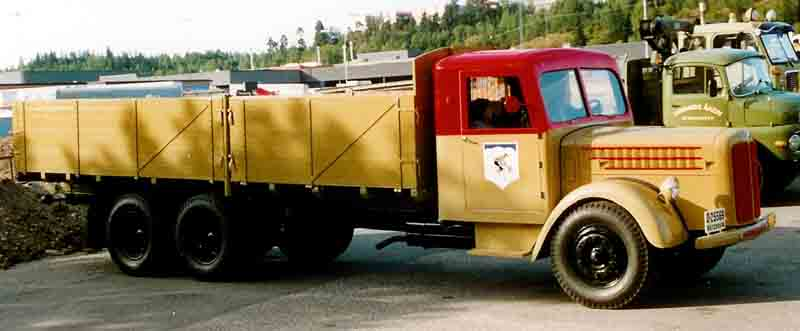
1948 Scania-Vabis LS23

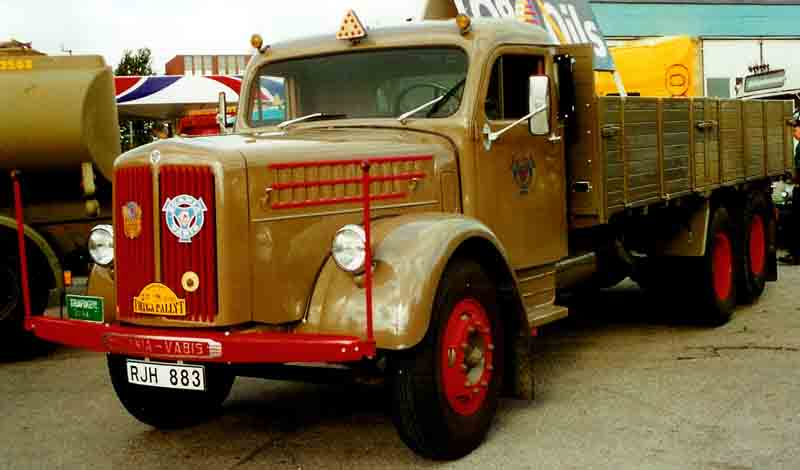
1950 Scania-Vabis LS64

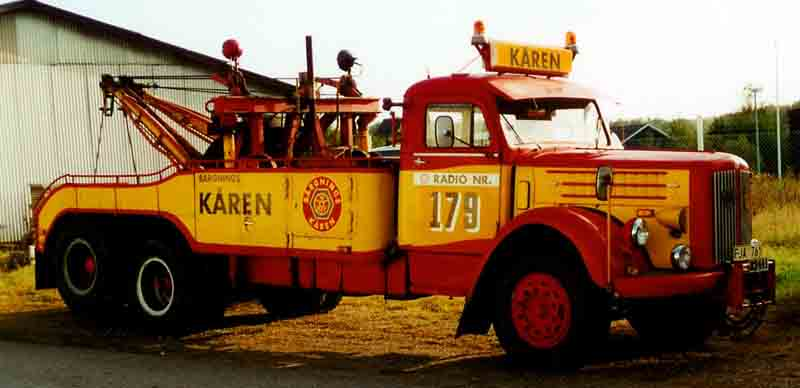
1958 Scania-Vabis LS71 tow truck
