= Scania-Vabis 314 =

Scania-Vabis 314/324/325
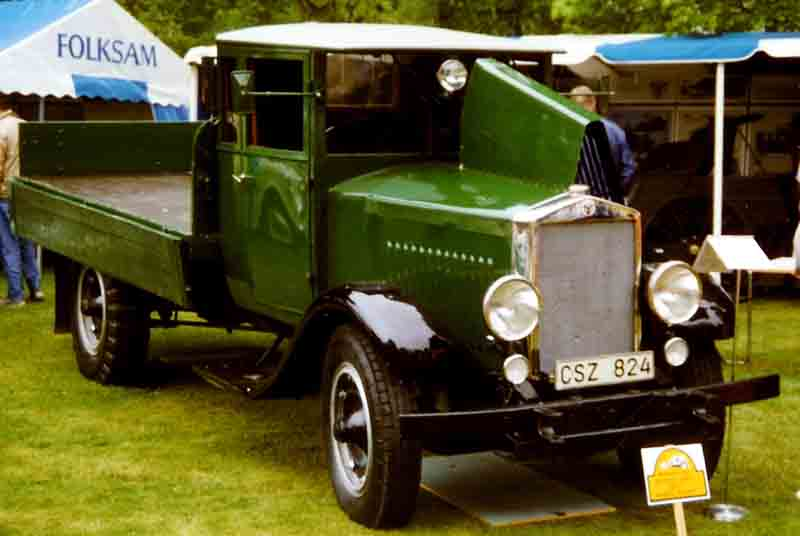

Overview
- Manufacturer: Scania-Vabis
- Production: 1925 - 1936, 907 produced

Body and chassis
- Class: Medium/heavy duty truck

Powertrain
- Engine: Scania-Vabis ohv petrol engine
- Transmission: 4 speed non-syncro manual

Dimensions
- Wheelbase: 3.3 m (129.9 in) - 5.0 m (196.9 in)
- Curb weight: 7,800 kg (17,196.1 lb) - 12,000 kg (26,455.5 lb) (gross weight)

Chronology
- Successor: Scania-Vabis L10

The Scania-Vabis 314/324/325 was a series of trucks produced by Swedish automaker Scania-Vabis between 1925 and 1936.

== History ==
Until 1927 Scania-Vabis had produced their trucks at two sites: at Scania in Malmö and at Vabis in Södertälje. The trucks were built entirely to customer order. This procedure was really not cost effective, Scania-Vabis trucks were very expensive and the company went bankrupt in 1921. After reconstruction, Scania-Vabis emphasized their efforts on a "standard truck" which was first produced in Södertälje in 1925. With this new truck the company started its standardization of components and minimizing the number of variants that has made Scania one of the world's most profitable truck manufacturer.

== Scania-Vabis 314 ==
Scania-Vabis’ new truck, unlike the older models, sported modern facilities like an overhead valve engine, four-speed gear box bolted directly to the clutch and the engine, prop shaft drive, pneumatic tires and a covered cab. The truck could reach the dizzying top speed of 40 km/h (25 mph), a doubling compared to its predecessors.

The smallest model 314 had a payload capacity of 1.5 tonnes. The car had a four-cylinder 3.5-liter engine but soon added a larger 4.3-liter variant. The lightweight 314-model disappeared again in 1927.

== Scania-Vabis 325 ==
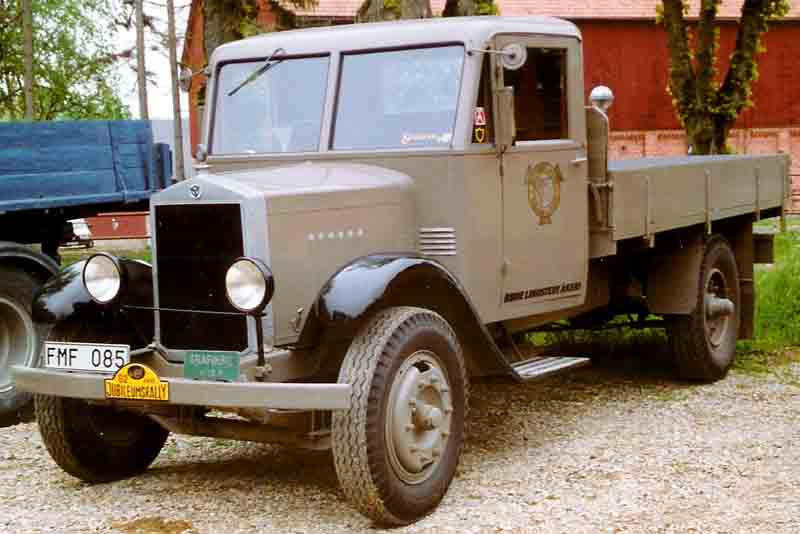
1933 Scania-Vabis 325

1925 also saw the introduction of the larger 325 with a payload capacity of 2 to 3 tonnes. The car had a four-cylinder 4.3-liter engine and was produced until 1936.

== Scania-Vabis 324 ==
From 1928 on Scania-Vabis offered their standard truck with a six-cylinder engine under the name 324. This model was produced until 1934, and some trucks were sold with four-cylinder engine.

== Engines ==
Model	Year	Engine	Displacement	Power	Type
314	1925-26	Scania-Vabis 1444: I4 ohv	3,461 cc (211.2 cu in)	36 bhp (27 kW)	Petrol engine
314,324,325	1925-36	Scania-Vabis 1544: I4 ohv	4,273 cc (260.8 cu in)	50 bhp (37 kW)	Petrol engine
324	1928-34	Scania-Vabis 1461: I6 ohv	5,784 cc (353.0 cu in)	75 bhp (56 kW)	Petrol engine
324	1929-34	Scania-Vabis 1561: I6 ohv	6,408 cc (391.0 cu in)	80 bhp (60 kW)	Petrol engine
