= Scania-Vabis 335 =

Scania-Vabis 335/345/355
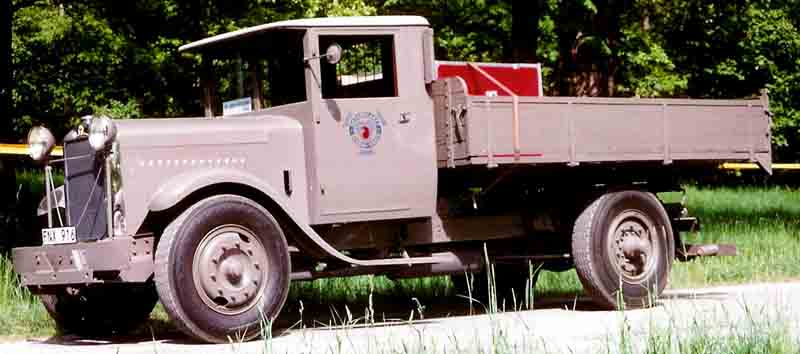

Overview
- Manufacturer: Scania-Vabis
- Production: 1931–1944, 1,404 produced

Body and chassis
- Class: Heavy duty truck

Powertrain
- Engine: Scania-Vabis ohv I4/I6
- Transmission: 4 speed non-syncro manual

Dimensions
- Wheelbase: 3.3 m (129.9 in) - 5.0 m (196.9 in)
- Curb weight: 7,800 kg (17,196.1 lb) - 12,000 kg (26,455.5 lb) (gross weight)

Chronology
- Successor: Scania-Vabis L20

The Scania-Vabis 335/345/355 was a series of heavy duty trucks produced by Swedish automaker Scania-Vabis between 1931 and 1944.

== Scania-Vabis 335 ==
In 1931 Scania-Vabis presented a larger version of its standard truck, called the 335. The truck had a payload capacity of 4 to 5 tonnes and was sold with a six-cylinder engine in petrol or Hesselman version. In 1936 the truck was modernized with a more streamlined front with a slightly sloping radiator cover. More importantly the engine and cab were moved forward so that the engine was mounted above the front axle. This meant increased payload capacity with a longer loading platform and a better distribution of axle loads. From 1936 onwards the truck was offered with Scania-Vabis’ first pre-chamber diesel engine.

Sales to private customers ceased at the outbreak of the Second World War. All production went instead to the Swedish Armed Forces and other public institutions. Most engines were converted to run on wood gas. The low energy content of wood gas led to plummeting engine power and the largest trucks were fitted with Scania-Vabis’ powerful eight-cylinder module engine.

== Scania-Vabis 345 ==
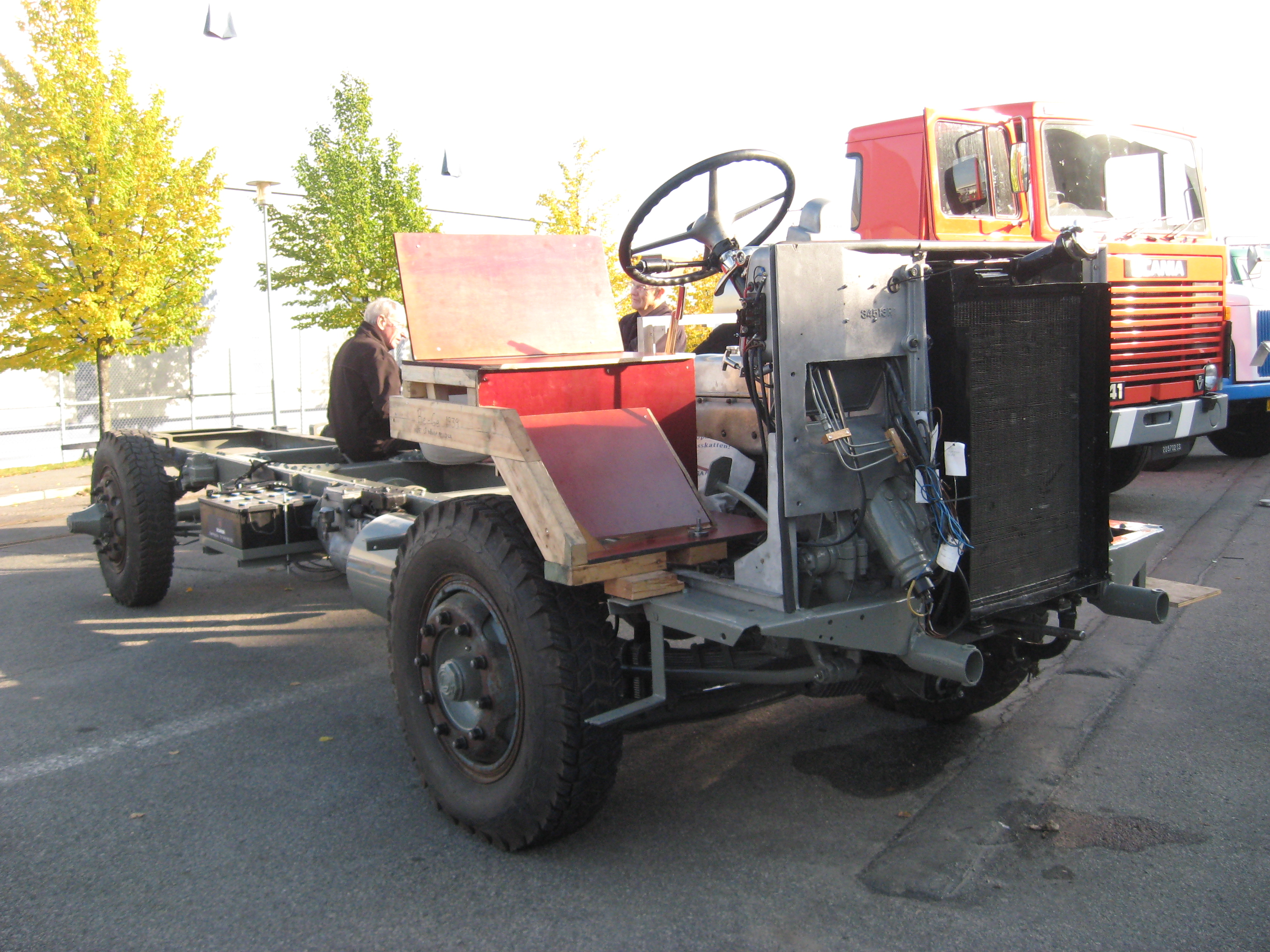
1939 Scania-Vabis 345 Bulldog chassis.

In 1932 Scania-Vabis introduced its first forward control truck, the 345. Scania-Vabis referred to forward control trucks as "Bulldogs". The truck was first sold with a four-cylinder engine, but soon six-cylinder engines were added. In the first version, called a "false Bulldog", the engine was still located behind the front axle and the driver sat beside the engine. This was replaced in 1934 with a "genuine" forward control version, where the engine and the driver sat above the front axle.

Production of the 345 model stopped at the outbreak of the war. The Bulldog model had never been a market hit and it would take another twenty-five years before Scania-Vabis unveiled a new forward control truck, the LB76.

== Scania-Vabis 355 ==
Scania-Vabis’ first long hauler, the 355, was presented in 1933 This model had an extra trailing axle in front of the driven third axle. The truck had a payload capacity of 6 to 7 tonnes and were built in both conventional and forward control version. The 355 disappeared again in 1936 and was replaced by larger versions of the 335.

== Engines ==
Model	Year	Engine	Displacement	Power	Type
345	1932-37	Scania-Vabis 1544: I4 ohv	4,394 cc (268.1 cu in)	50 bhp (37 kW)	Petrol engine
345	1932-38	Scania-Vabis 1461: I6 ohv	5,784 cc (353.0 cu in)	75 bhp (56 kW)	Petrol engine
335,345,355	1931-38	Scania-Vabis 1561: I6 ohv	6,408 cc (391.0 cu in)	80 bhp (60 kW)	Petrol engine
345	1934-35	Scania-Vabis 1562: I6 ohv	6,408 cc (391.0 cu in)	80 bhp (60 kW)	Hesselman engine
335,355	1933-40	Scania-Vabis 1565: I6 ohv	7,066 cc (431.2 cu in)	95 bhp (71 kW)	Petrol engine
355	1933-34	Scania-Vabis 1566: I6 ohv	7,066 cc (431.2 cu in)	80 bhp (60 kW)	Hesselman engine
335,345	1936-38	Scania-Vabis 1662: I6 ohv	7,755 cc (473.2 cu in)	110 bhp (82 kW)	Hesselman engine
335	1936-44	Scania-Vabis 1664: I6 ohv	7,755 cc (473.2 cu in)	140 bhp (104 kW)	Petrol engine
335	1936-39	Scania-Vabis 1665: I6 ohv	7,755 cc (473.2 cu in)	110 bhp (82 kW)	Petrol engine
335,345	1936-44	Scania-Vabis 16641: I6 ohv	7,755 cc (473.2 cu in)	120 bhp (89 kW)	Pre-chamber diesel
335	1941-42	Scania-Vabis B801: I8 ohv	10,340 cc (631 cu in)	160 bhp (119 kW)	Wood gas conversion
