= Scania-Vabis L75 =

Scania-Vabis L75/L76
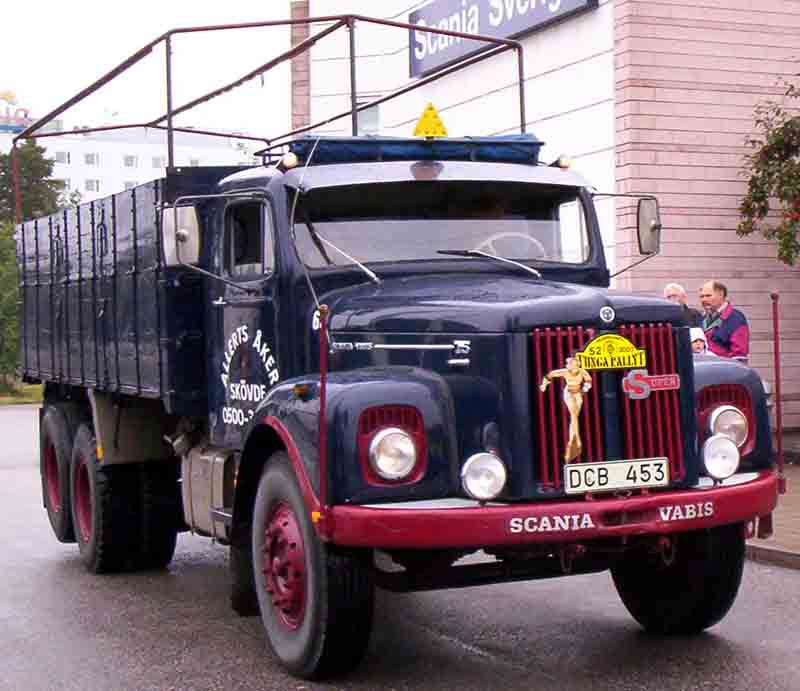

Overview
- Manufacturer: Scania-Vabis
- Production: 1958–1968, 43,334 produced

Body and chassis
- Class: Heavy duty truck

Powertrain
- Engine: Scania-Vabis ohv I6 diesel engine
- Transmission: 5/10 speed manual

Dimensions
- Wheelbase: 3.4 m (133.9 in) - 5.4 m (212.6 in)
- Curb weight: 13,000 kg (28,660.1 lb) - 22,500 kg (49,604.0 lb) (gross weight)

Chronology
- Predecessor: Scania-Vabis Regent
- Successor: Scania L110

The Scania-Vabis L75/L76 was a series of heavy duty trucks produced by Swedish automaker Scania-Vabis between 1958 and 1968.

== Scania-Vabis L75 ==
In the spring of 1958, Scania-Vabis introduced a new generation of trucks, with newly designed six-cylinder engines, stronger chassis components and a new, more spacious and comfortable cab. The cab would be used for all conventional trucks until 1980. The largest model, called L75, had a ten-litre engine. The truck was also offered with a trailing axle. This version was called the LS75, with an “S” for "support axle". For real heavy duty work Scania-Vabis offered a version with tandem drive rear axles. It was called LT75, with “T” for "tandem". The L75 series trucks came with air brakes, but power steering was still an option. From 1961 the truck was offered with a turbo-diesel.

== Scania-Vabis L76 ==
In early 1963 the improved L76/LS76/LT76 series was introduced, with an eleven-litre engine and dual circuit brakes.

Since the 345 model had disappeared in 1939, Scania-Vabis had only built conventional trucks, as it was the most popular design in the Scandinavian market. By the early 1960s, many European countries introduced regulations limiting the maximum length for truck and trailer. This resulted in increased demand for forward control trucks. With the introduction of the L76 series there was also a forward control version, LB76 (LBS76 with trailing axle). The “B” stood for "Bulldog" which was Scania-Vabis’ name for forward control vehicles. The LB cab was fixed, which made access to the engine for service and maintenance difficult.

== Engines ==
| Model | Year | Engine | Displacement | Power | Type |
|---|---|---|---|---|---|
| L75 | 1958-63 | Scania-Vabis D10: I6 ohv | 10,261 cc (626.2 cu in) | 165 bhp (123 kW) | Diesel engine |
| L75 Super | 1961-63 | Scania-Vabis DS10: I6 ohv | 10,261 cc (626.2 cu in) | 205 bhp (153 kW) | Turbodiesel |
| L76 | 1963-68 | Scania-Vabis D11: I6 ohv | 11,021 cc (672.5 cu in) | 190 bhp (142 kW) | Diesel engine |
| L76 Super | 1963-68 | Scania-Vabis DS11: I6 ohv | 11,021 cc (672.5 cu in) | 260 bhp (194 kW) | Turbodiesel |

== Gallery ==
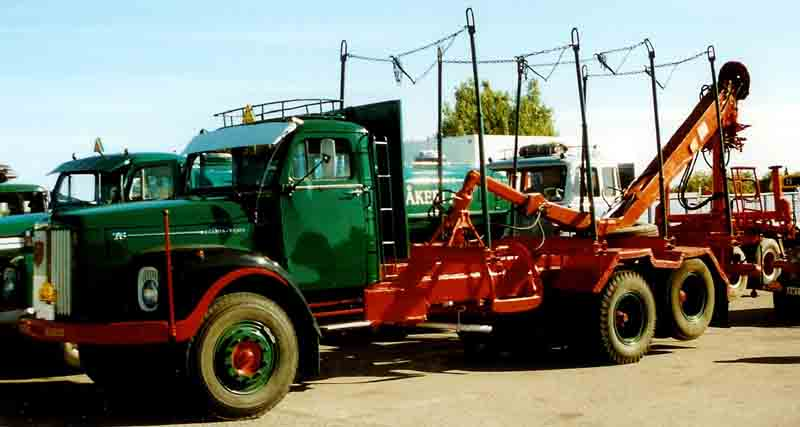
1960 Scania-Vabis LS75

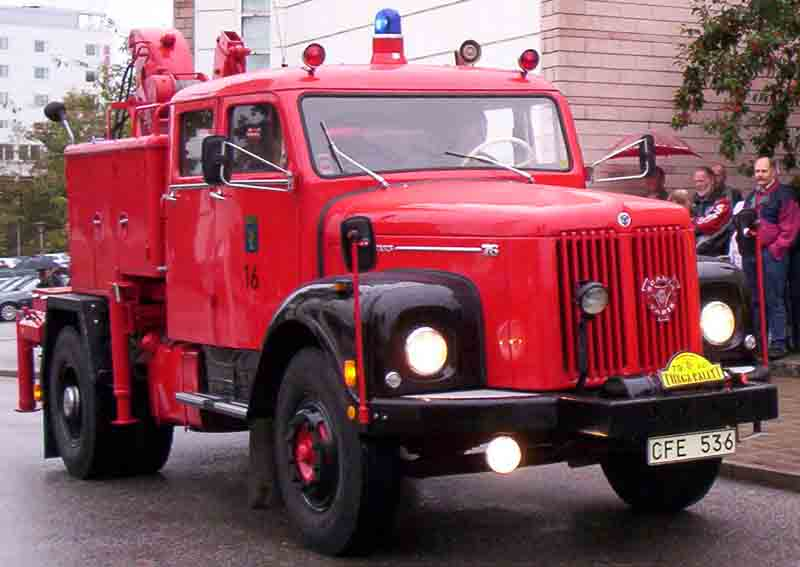
1967 Scania-Vabis L76 fire engine

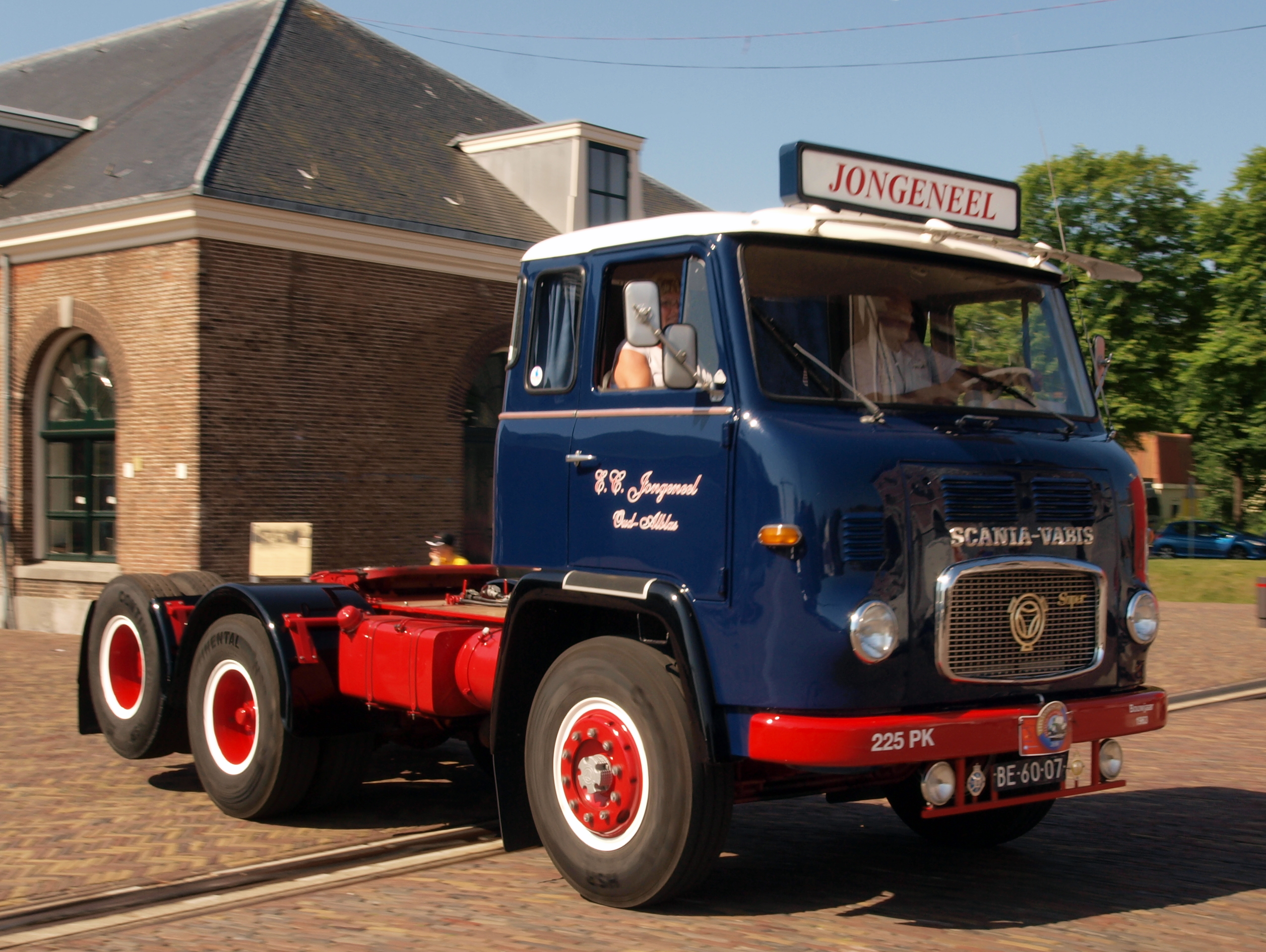
1963 Scania-Vabis LBS76

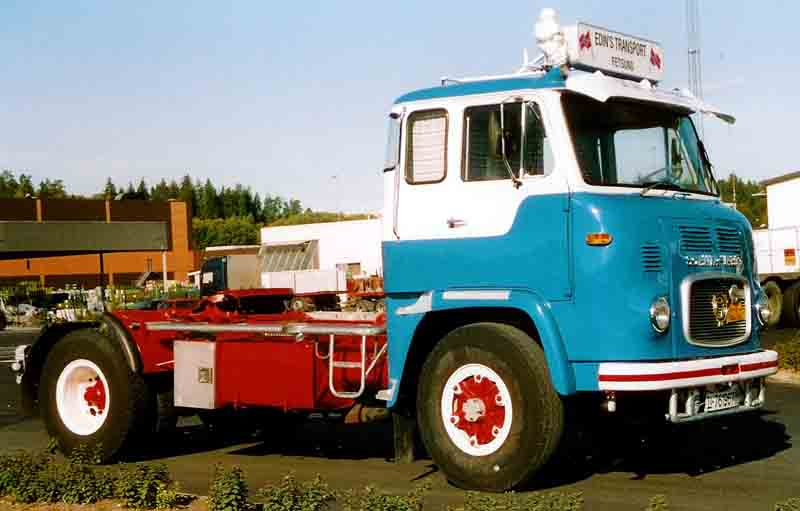
Scania-Vabis LB76 Truck
