= Scania-Vabis L10 =

Scania-Vabis L10/L40/L51 Drabant
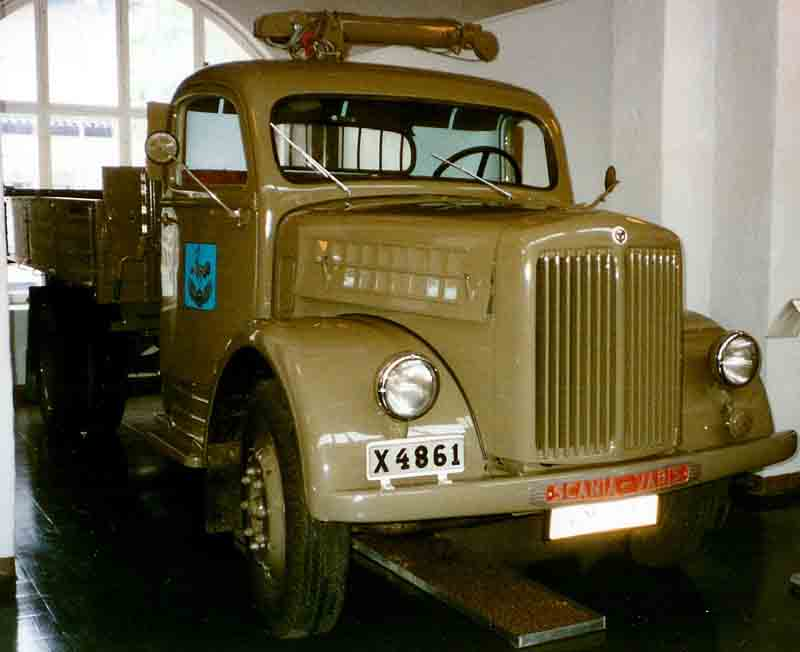

Overview
- Manufacturer: Scania-Vabis
- Production: 1944 - 1959, 14,090 produced

Body and chassis
- Class: Medium/heavy duty truck

Powertrain
- Engine: Scania-Vabis ohv inline 4
- Transmission: 4/5 speed manual

Dimensions
- Wheelbase: 3.4 m (133.9 in) - 5.0 m (196.9 in)
- Curb weight: 8,500 kg (18,739.3 lb) - 11,500 kg (25,353.2 lb) (gross weight)

Chronology
- Predecessor: Scania-Vabis 325
- Successor: Scania-Vabis L55

The Scania-Vabis L10/L40/L51 was a series of trucks produced by Swedish automaker Scania-Vabis between 1944 and 1959.

== Scania-Vabis L10 ==
During the Second World War Scania-Vabis’ entire production went to the Swedish Armed Forces and other public institutions. The company designed a new generation of trucks for post war times, when the pent-up demand for new trucks was expected to boom. The first post-war model, L10, was introduced in 1944. It was the first Scania-Vabis truck with left hand drive. The L10 Series had a four-cylinder variant of the module engine Scania-Vabis had introduced in the late 1930s, which was also built in the six- and eight cylinder versions, as petrol or diesel engine. The diesel engine in the L10 series was a pre-chamber engine. The truck could also be delivered with four-wheel drive, a version known as the F10. It had a war time chassis and military trucks were also sold with petrol engine.

Before the war, Scania-Vabis purchased many components from Germany and Great Britain, but these were now largely replaced by Swedish-made components. Unfortunately, production was in several cases started without adequate testing and those first postwar trucks suffered quality problems that cost Scania-Vabis both money and reputation to repair.

== Scania-Vabis L40 ==
At the end of 1949, Scania-Vabis introduced a direct injected diesel development of their module engine. It had been designed in collaboration with British truck manufacturer Leyland Motors. With the new engine, the four-cylinder truck got its name changed to L40. Otherwise the truck was mostly unchanged. In early 1950 there were also a small number of the four-wheel drive F40 built, before that model disappeared because of low market demand. In 1951 the old fashioned non-synchro four-speed gear box was replaced by a synchronized five-speed transmission.

== Scania-Vabis L51 Drabant ==
In the spring of 1953 the final development of Scania-Vabis’ module engines were introduced, with larger displacement. The four-cylinder truck was now called L51 Drabant, with a payload capacity of 5.5 to 6 tonnes. It was also the first Scania-Vabis truck with a proper name.

== Engines ==
Model	Year	Engine	Displacement	Power	Type
F10	1944-49	Scania-Vabis B402: I4 ohv	5,650 cc (345 cu in)	115 bhp (86 kW)	Petrol engine
L10, F10	1944-49	Scania-Vabis D402: I4 ohv	5,650 cc (345 cu in)	90 bhp (67 kW)	Pre-chamber diesel
L40, F40	1949-53	Scania-Vabis D422: I4 ohv	5,650 cc (345 cu in)	90 bhp (67 kW)	Direct injection diesel
L51 Drabant	1953-59	Scania-Vabis D442: I4 ohv	6,232 cc (380.3 cu in)	100 bhp (75 kW)	Direct injection diesel

== Gallery ==
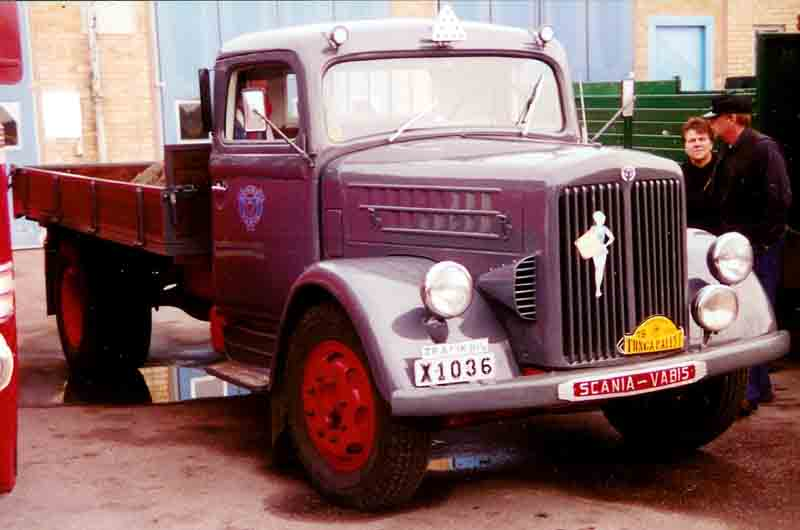
1946 Scania-Vabis L12

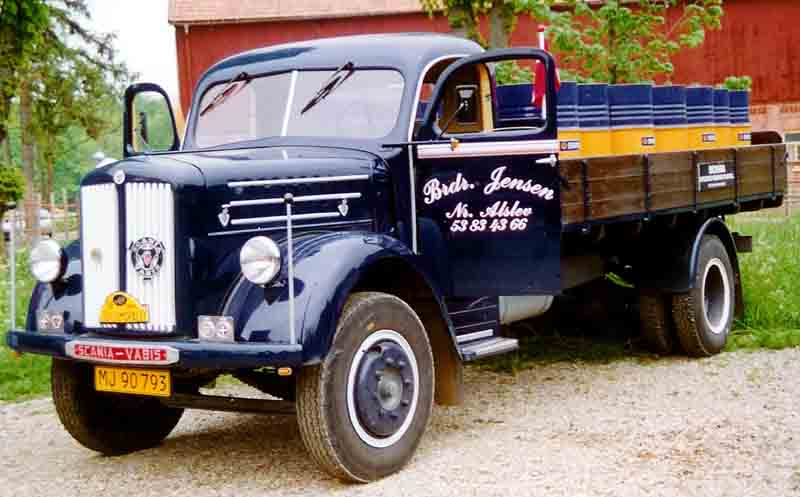
1949 Scania-Vabis L44

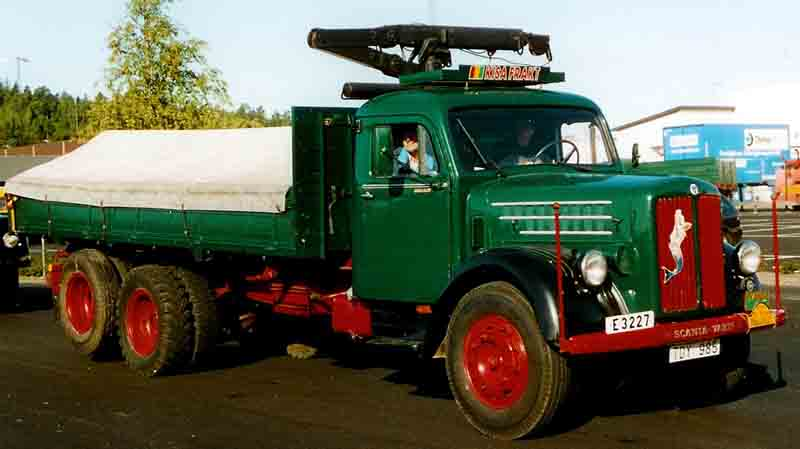
1954 Scania-Vabis L51
